= National Telecom MRT station =

Railway station in Bangkok, Thailand

National Telecom โทรคมนาคมแห่งชาติ
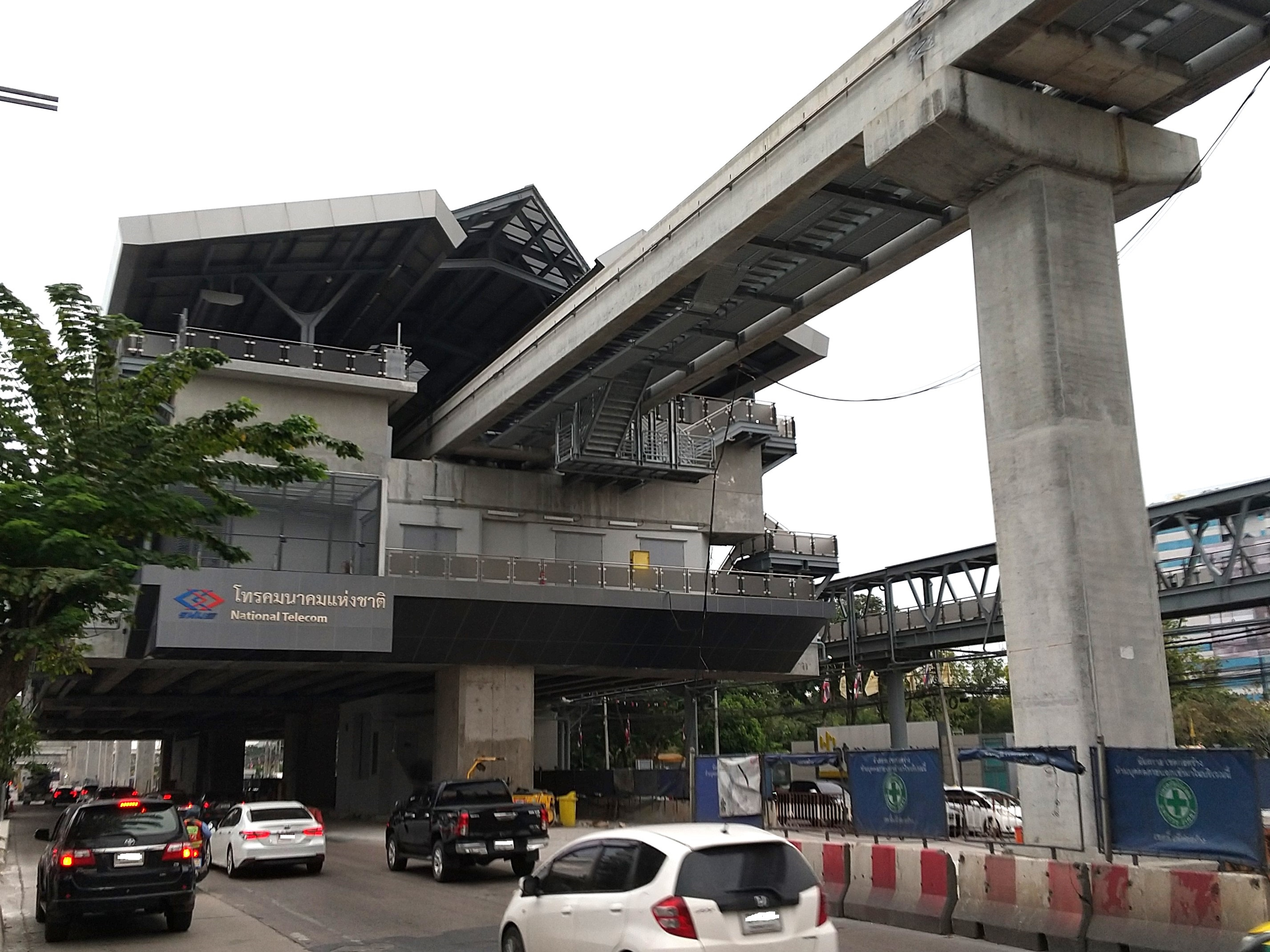

General information
- Location: Lak Si District, Bangkok, Thailand
- System: MRT
- Owner: Mass Rapid Transit Authority of Thailand (MRTA)
- Operator: Northern Bangkok Monorail Company Limited
- Line: Pink Line

Other information
- Station code: PK13

History
- Opened: 21 November 2023

Services
Preceding station	Metropolitan Rapid Transit	Following station
Government Complex towards Nonthaburi Civic Center	Pink Line	Lak Si towards Min Buri
Location

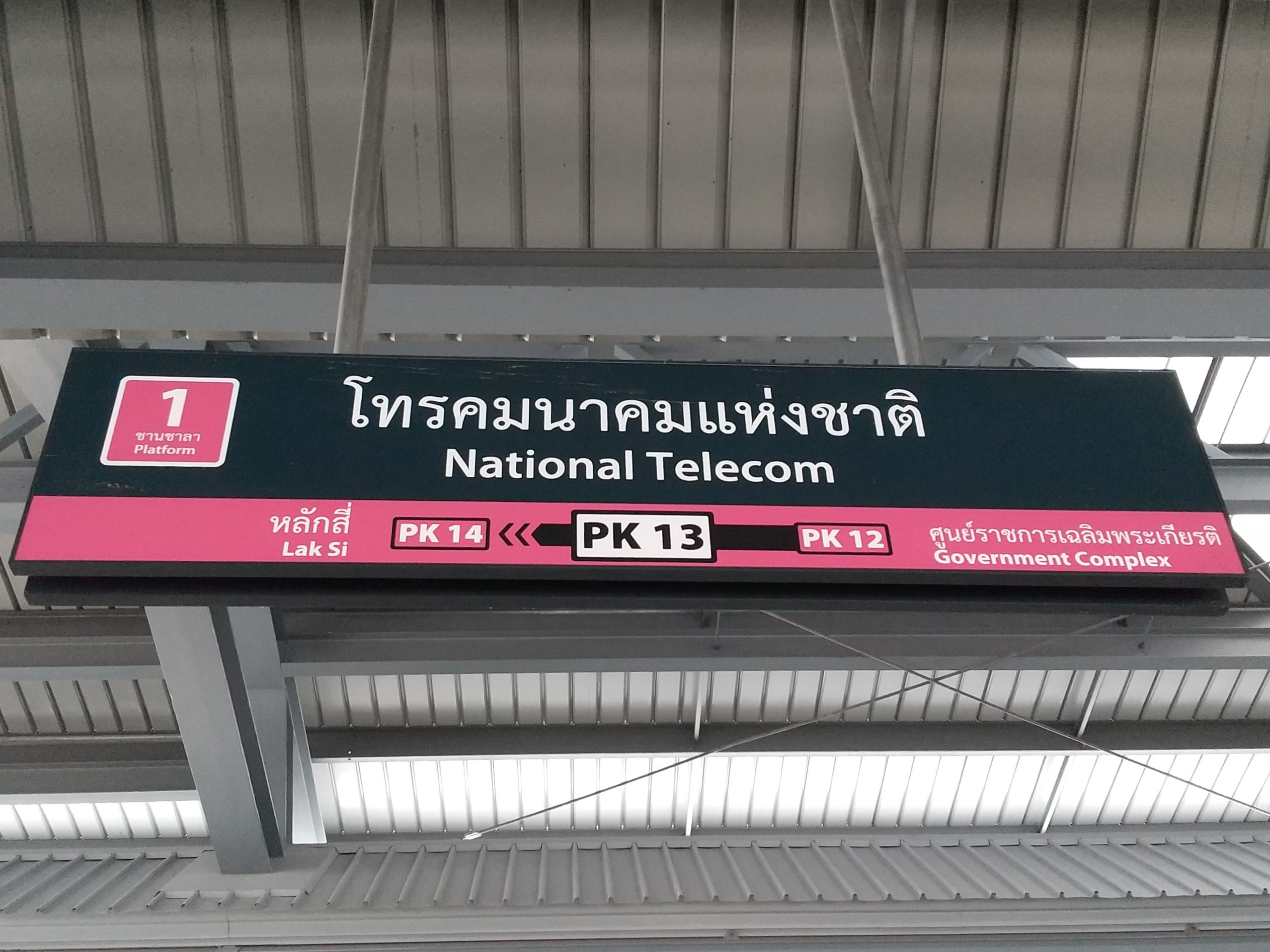
Signage

National Telecom station (Thai: สถานีโทรคมนาคมแห่งชาติ, RTGS: Sathani Thora Khamanakhom Haeng Chat) is a Bangkok MRT station on the Pink Line. The station is located on Chaeng Watthana Road, near the National Telecom Headquarters and the Ministry of Justice in Lak Si district, Bangkok. The station has four exits. It opened on 21 November 2023 as part of trial operations on the entire Pink Line.
