= Khae Rai MRT station =

Railway station in Nonthaburi, Thailand

Khae Rai แคราย
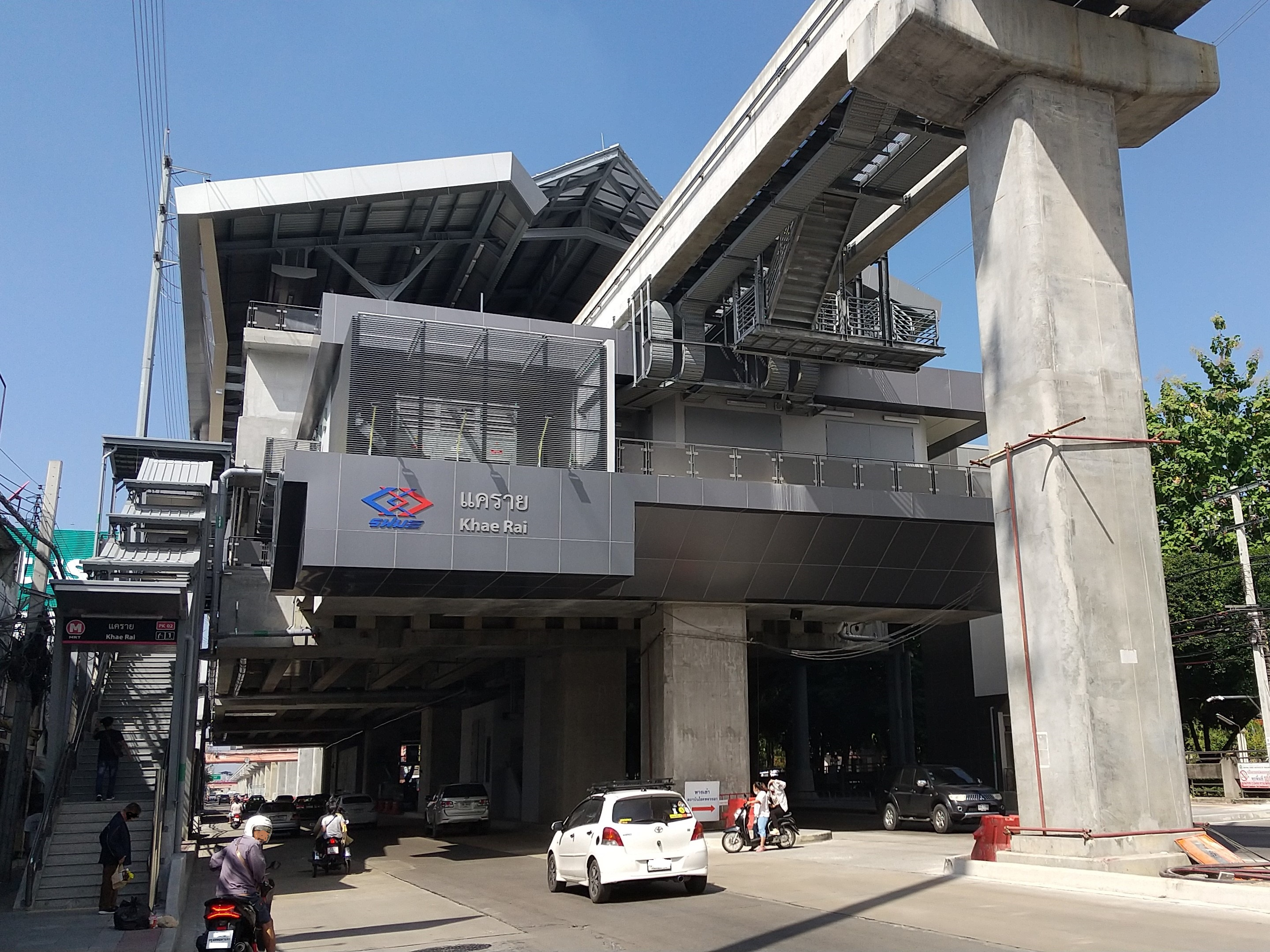

General information
- Location: Mueang Nonthaburi District, Nonthaburi province, Thailand
- Coordinates: 13.8626°N 100.5207°E
- System: MRT
- Owner: Mass Rapid Transit Authority of Thailand (MRTA)
- Operator: Northern Bangkok Monorail Company Limited
- Line: Pink Line

Other information
- Station code: PK02

History
- Opened: 21 November 2023

Services
Preceding station	Metropolitan Rapid Transit	Following station
Nonthaburi Civic Center Terminus	Pink Line	Sanambin Nam towards Min Buri
Location

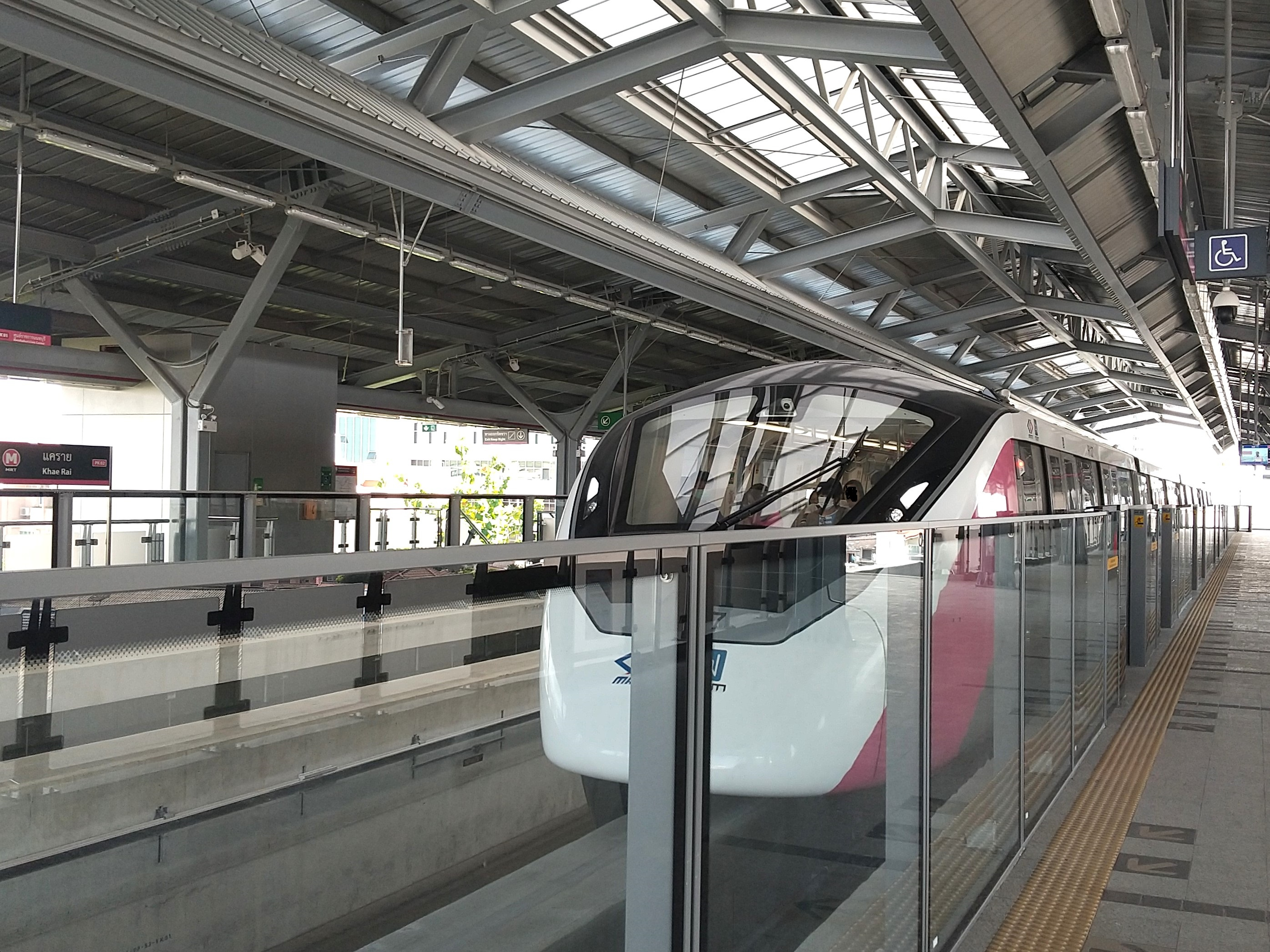
Platforms

Khae Rai station (Thai: สถานีแคราย) is a Bangkok MRT station on the Pink Line. The station is located on Tiwanon Road in Mueang Nonthaburi district, Nonthaburi province. The station has four exits. It opened on 21 November 2023 as part of trial operations on the entire Pink Line.
