= Royal Irrigation Department MRT station =

Railway station in Nonthaburi, Thailand

Royal Irrigation Department กรมชลประทาน
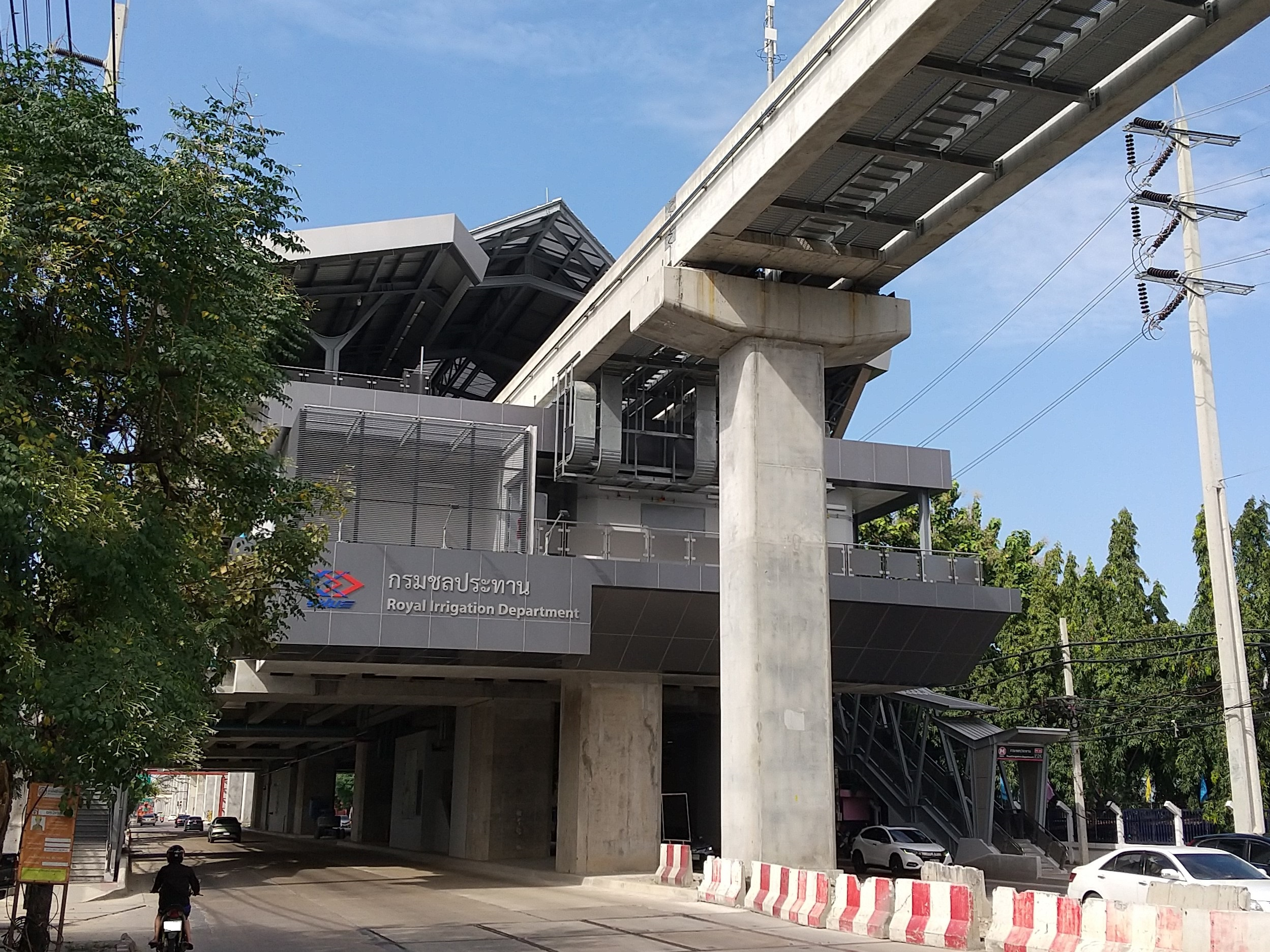

General information
- Location: Pak Kret District, Nonthaburi province, Thailand
- Coordinates: 13.8986°N 100.5071°E
- System: MRT
- Owner: Mass Rapid Transit Authority of Thailand (MRTA)
- Operator: Northern Bangkok Monorail Company Limited
- Line: Pink Line

Other information
- Station code: PK05

History
- Opened: 21 November 2023

Services
Preceding station	Metropolitan Rapid Transit	Following station
Samakkhi towards Nonthaburi Civic Center	Pink Line	Yaek Pak Kret towards Min Buri
Location

Royal Irrigation Department station (Thai: สถานีกรมชลประทาน, RTGS: Sathani Krom Chonlaprathan) is a Bangkok MRT station on the Pink Line. The station is located on Tiwanon Road in Pak Kret district, Nonthaburi province. The station has four exits and serves the Royal Irrigation Department and Panyananthaphikkhu Chonprathan Medical Center of the Faculty of Medicine, Srinakharinwirot University. It opened on 21 November 2023 as part of trial operations on the entire Pink Line.

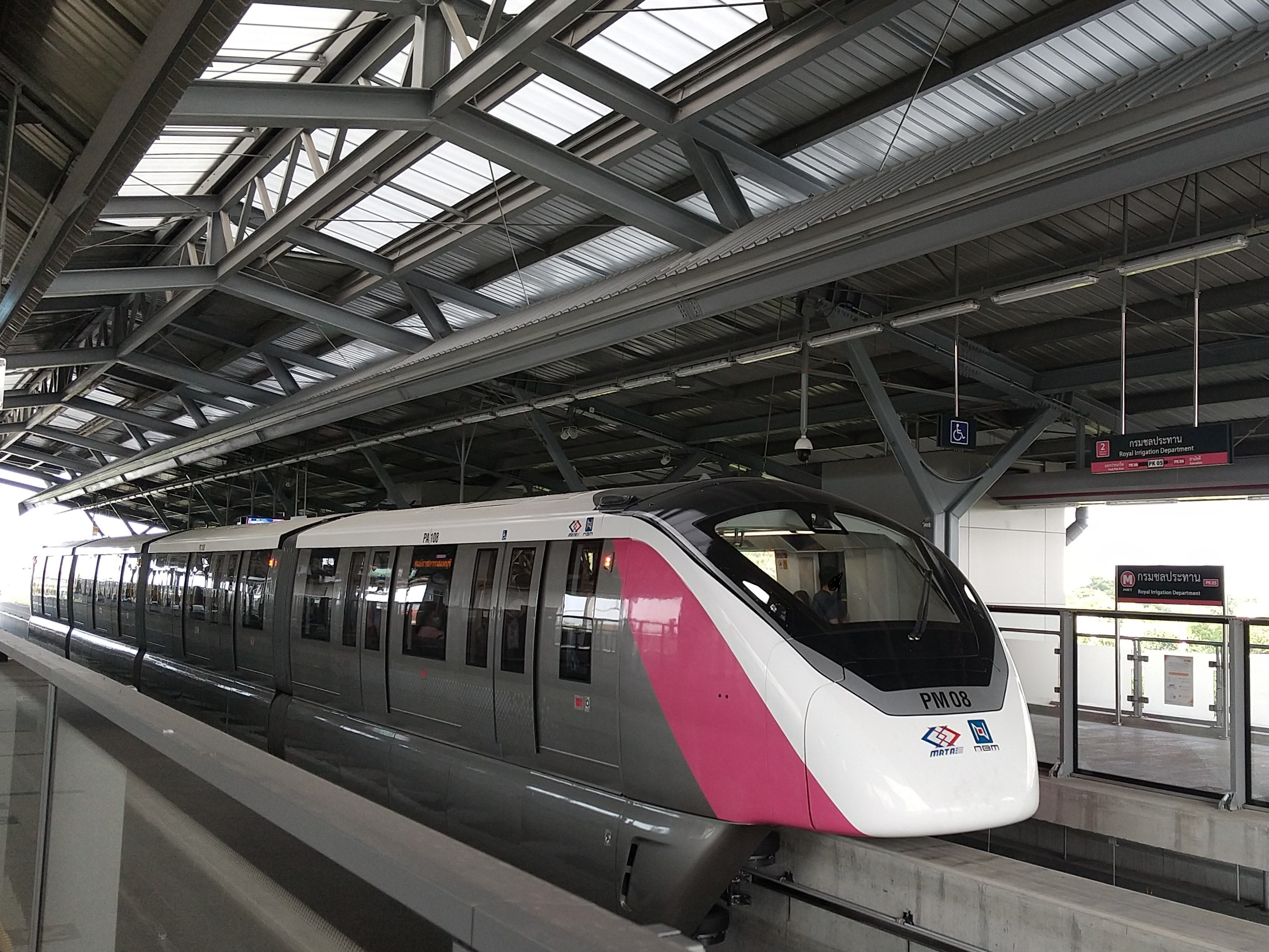
Platforms
