= Bang Chan MRT station =

Train station in Bangkok, Thailand

Bang Chan บางชัน
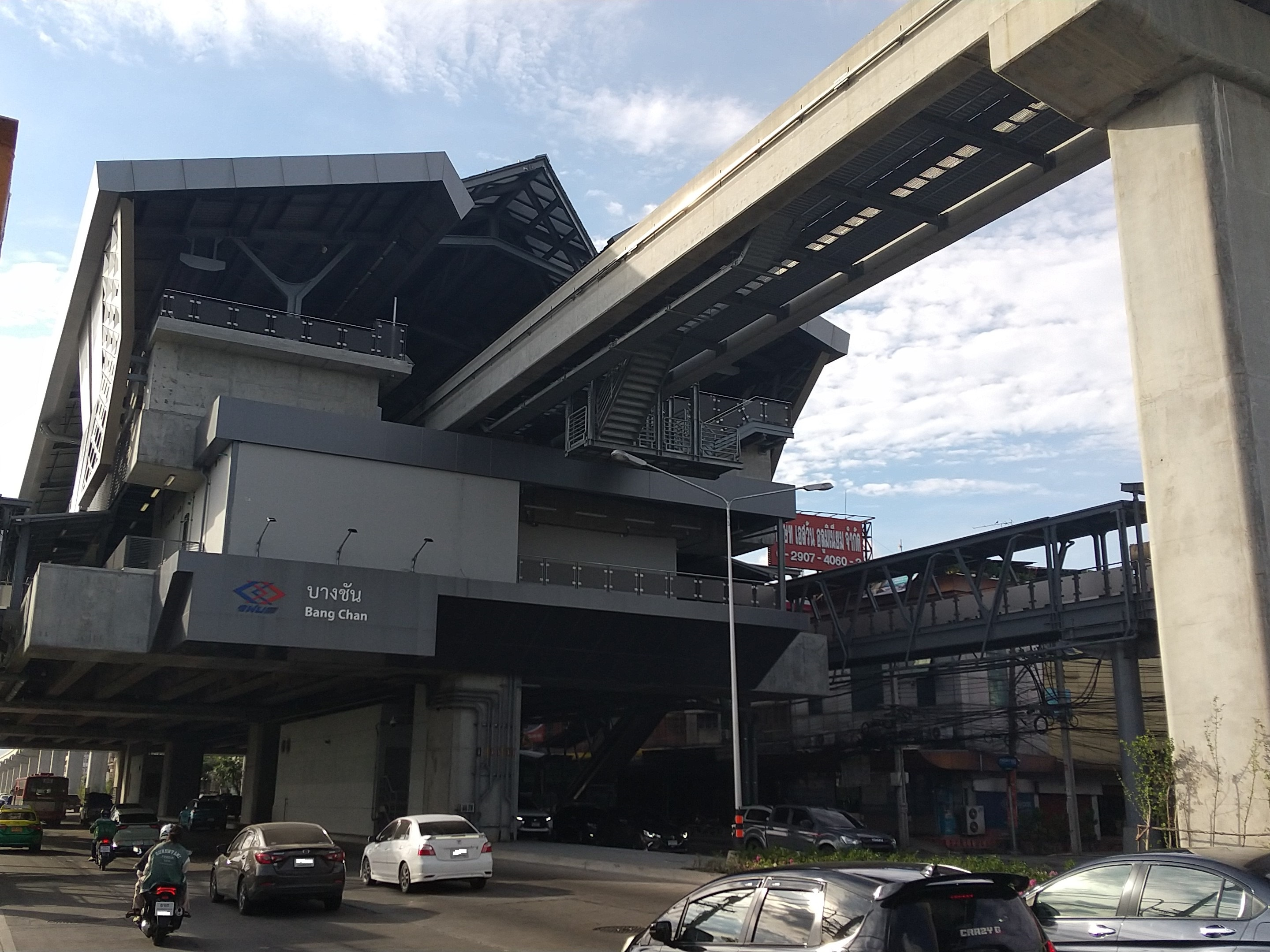

General information
- Location: Min Buri District, Bangkok, Thailand
- System: MRT
- Owner: Mass Rapid Transit Authority of Thailand (MRTA)
- Operator: Northern Bangkok Monorail Company Limited
- Line: Pink Line

Other information
- Station code: PK27

History
- Opened: 21 November 2023

Services
| Preceding station | Metropolitan Rapid Transit | Following station |
|---|---|---|
| Nopparat towards Nonthaburi Civic Center | Pink Line | Setthabutbamphen towards Min Buri |
Location

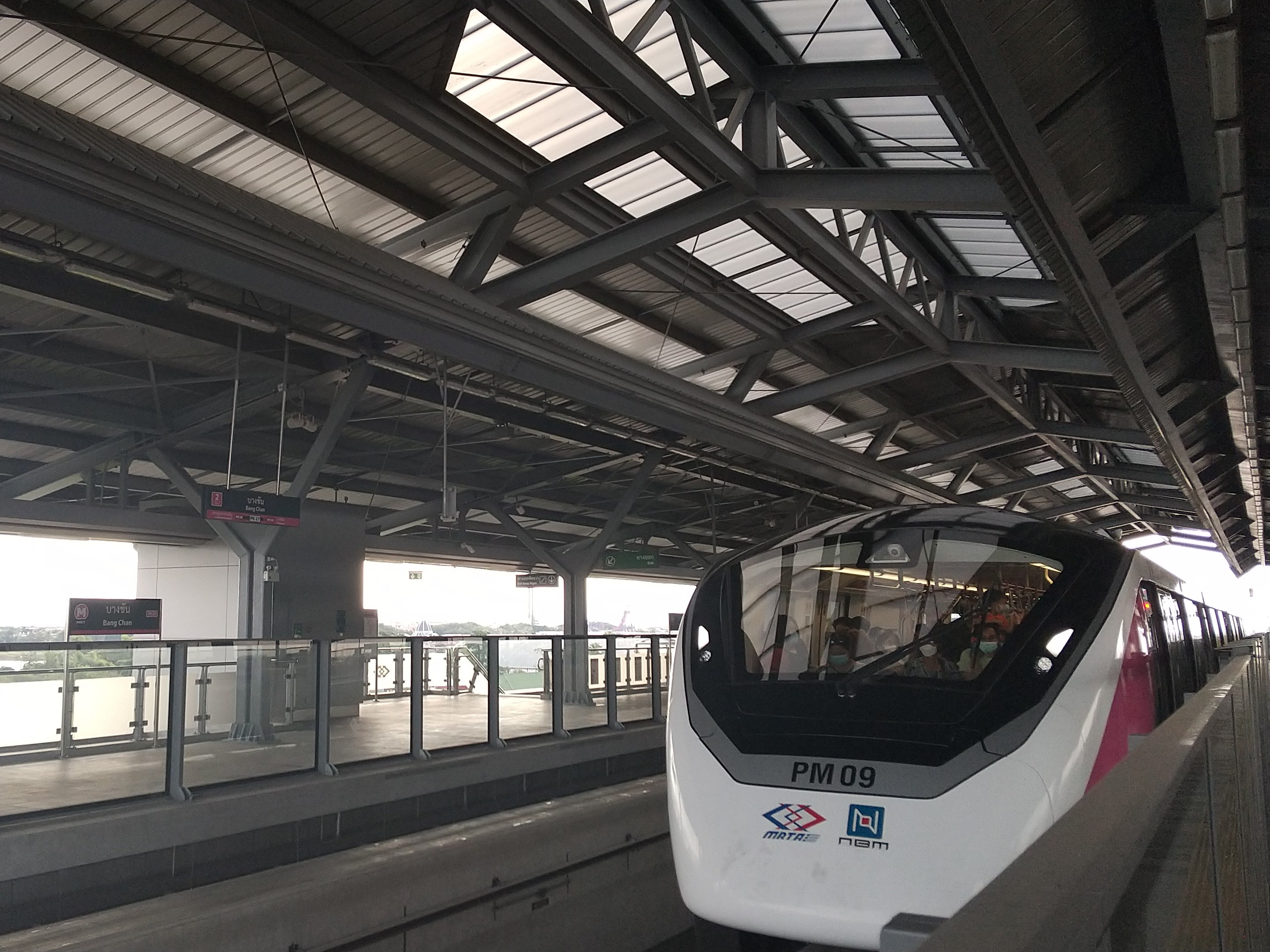
Platforms

Bang Chan station (Thai: สถานีบางชัน) is a Bangkok MRT station on the Pink Line. The station is located on Ram Inthra Road, near Soi Ram Inthra 115 in Min Buri district, Bangkok. The station has four exits and serves Bang Chan Industrial Estate. It opened on 21 November 2023 as part of trial operations on the entire Pink Line.
