= Sanambin Nam MRT station =

Metro station in Nonthaburi, Thailand

Sanambin Nam สนามบินน้ำ
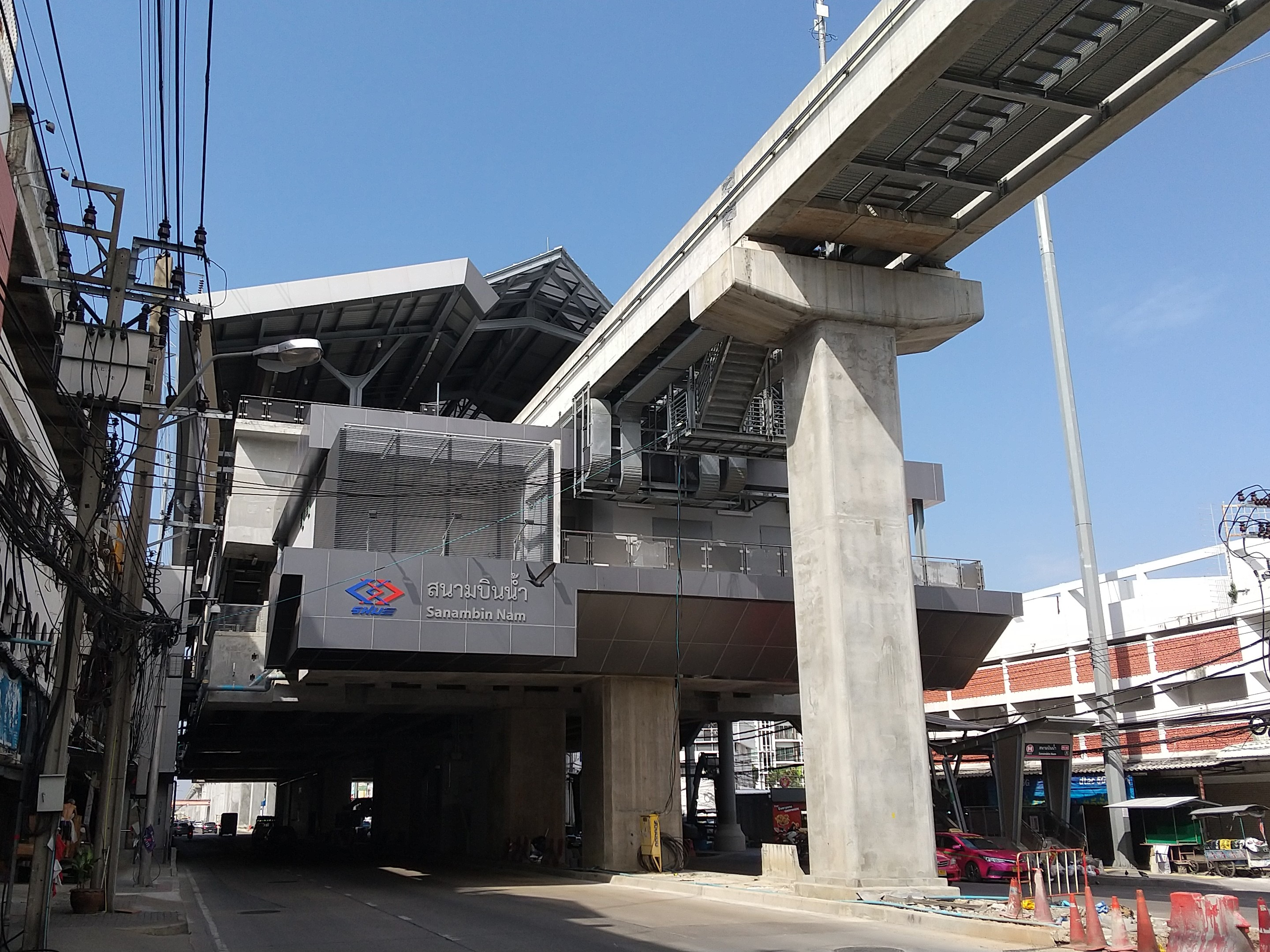

General information
- Location: Mueang Nonthaburi District, Nonthaburi province, Thailand
- Coordinates: 13.8741°N 100.5163°E
- System: MRT
- Owner: Mass Rapid Transit Authority of Thailand (MRTA)
- Operator: Northern Bangkok Monorail Company Limited
- Line: Pink Line

Other information
- Station code: PK03

History
- Opened: 21 November 2023

Services
| Preceding station | Metropolitan Rapid Transit | Following station |
|---|---|---|
| Khae Rai towards Nonthaburi Civic Center | Pink Line | Samakkhi towards Min Buri |
Location

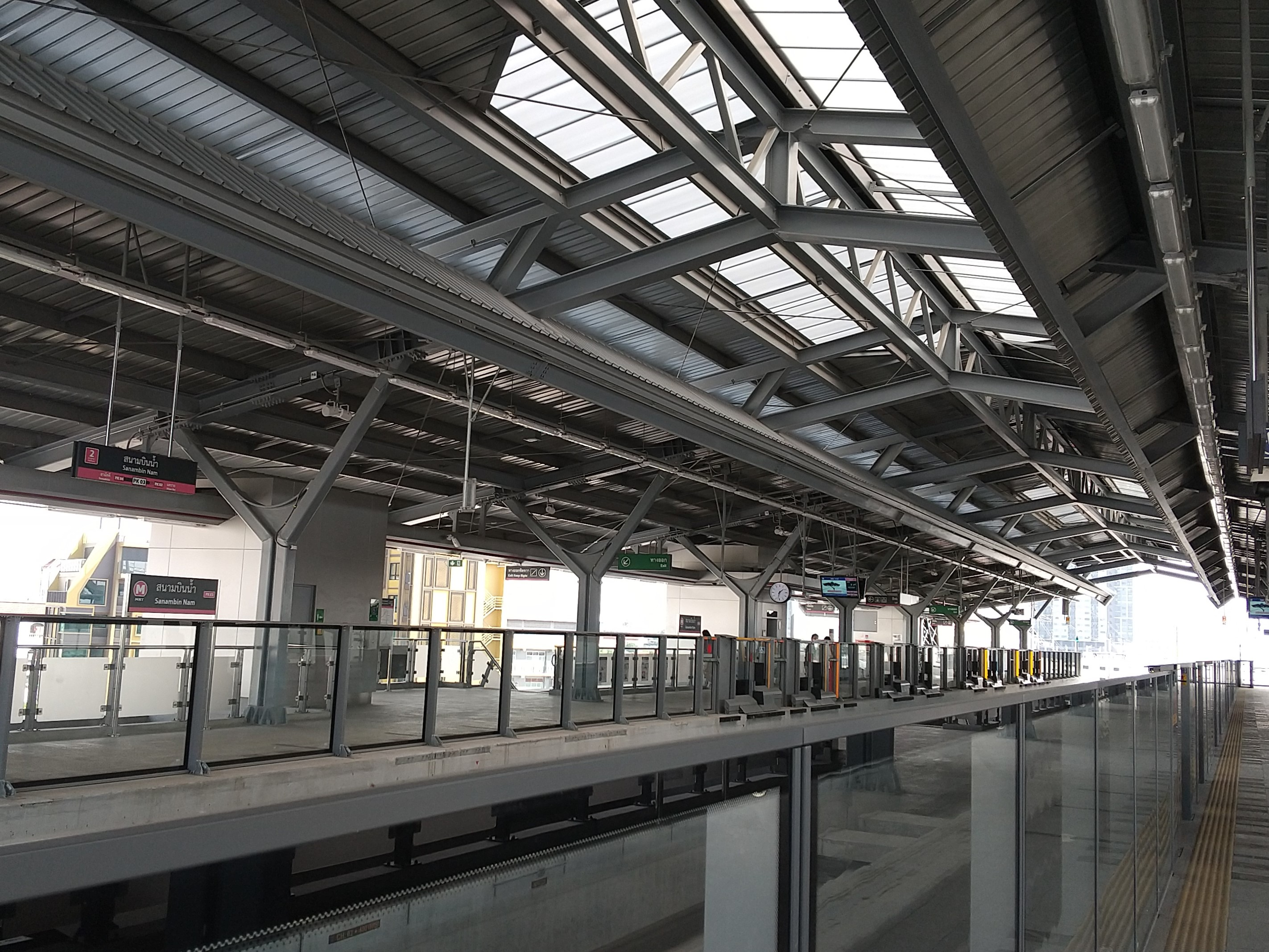
Platforms

Sanambin Nam station (Thai: สถานีสนามบินน้ำ) is a Bangkok MRT station on the Pink Line. The station is located on Tiwanon Road, near Sanambin Nam intersection in Mueang Nonthaburi district, Nonthaburi province. The station has four exits. It opened on 21 November 2023 as part of trial operations on the entire Pink Line.
