= Setthabutbamphen MRT station =

Railway station in Bangkok, Thailand

Setthabutbamphen เศรษฐบุตรบำเพ็ญ
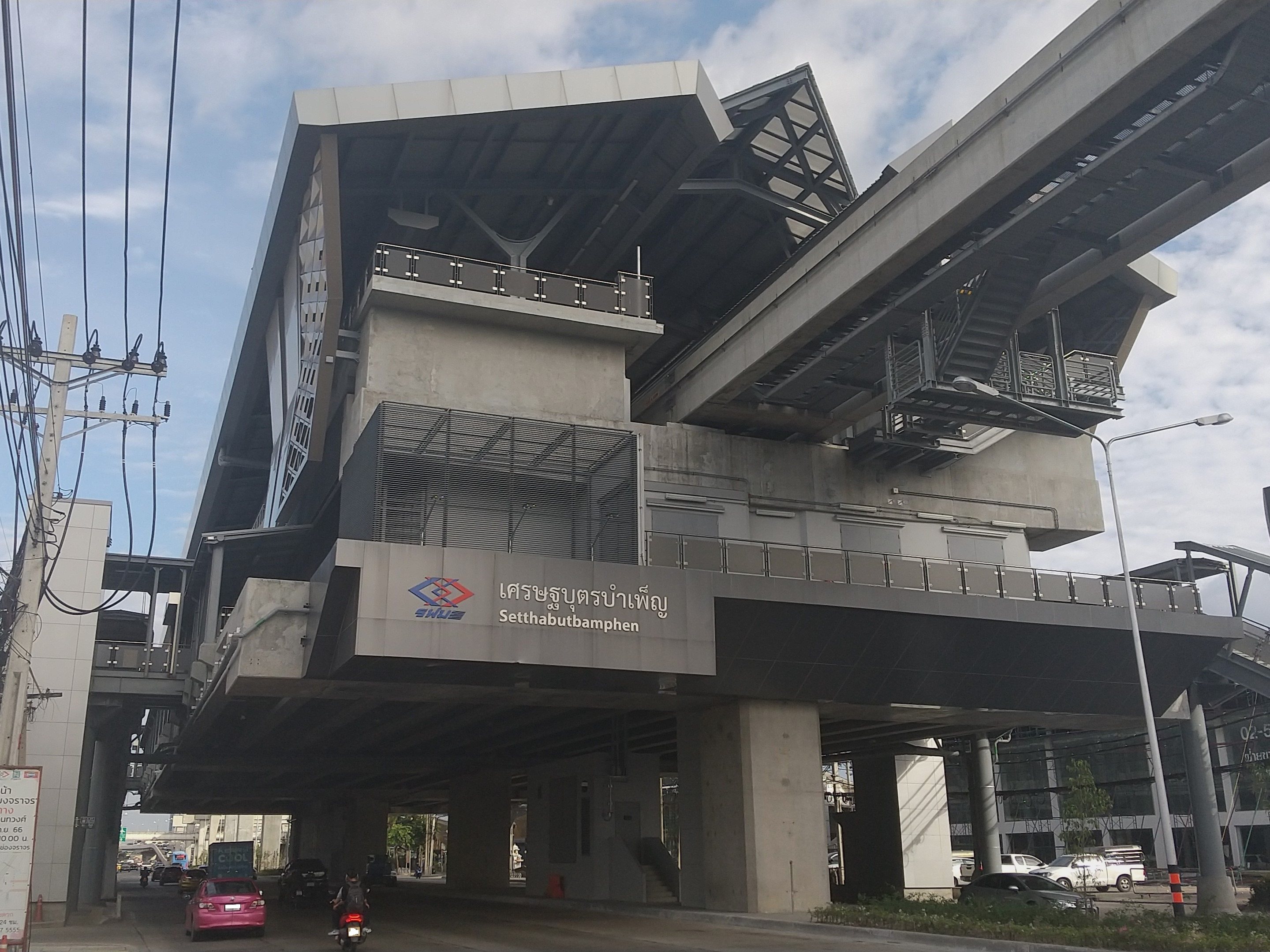

General information
- Location: Min Buri District, Bangkok, Thailand
- System: MRT
- Owner: Mass Rapid Transit Authority of Thailand (MRTA)
- Operator: Northern Bangkok Monorail Company Limited
- Line: Pink Line

Other information
- Station code: PK28

History
- Opened: 21 November 2023

Services
Preceding station	Metropolitan Rapid Transit	Following station
Bang Chan towards Nonthaburi Civic Center	Pink Line	Min Buri Market towards Min Buri
Location

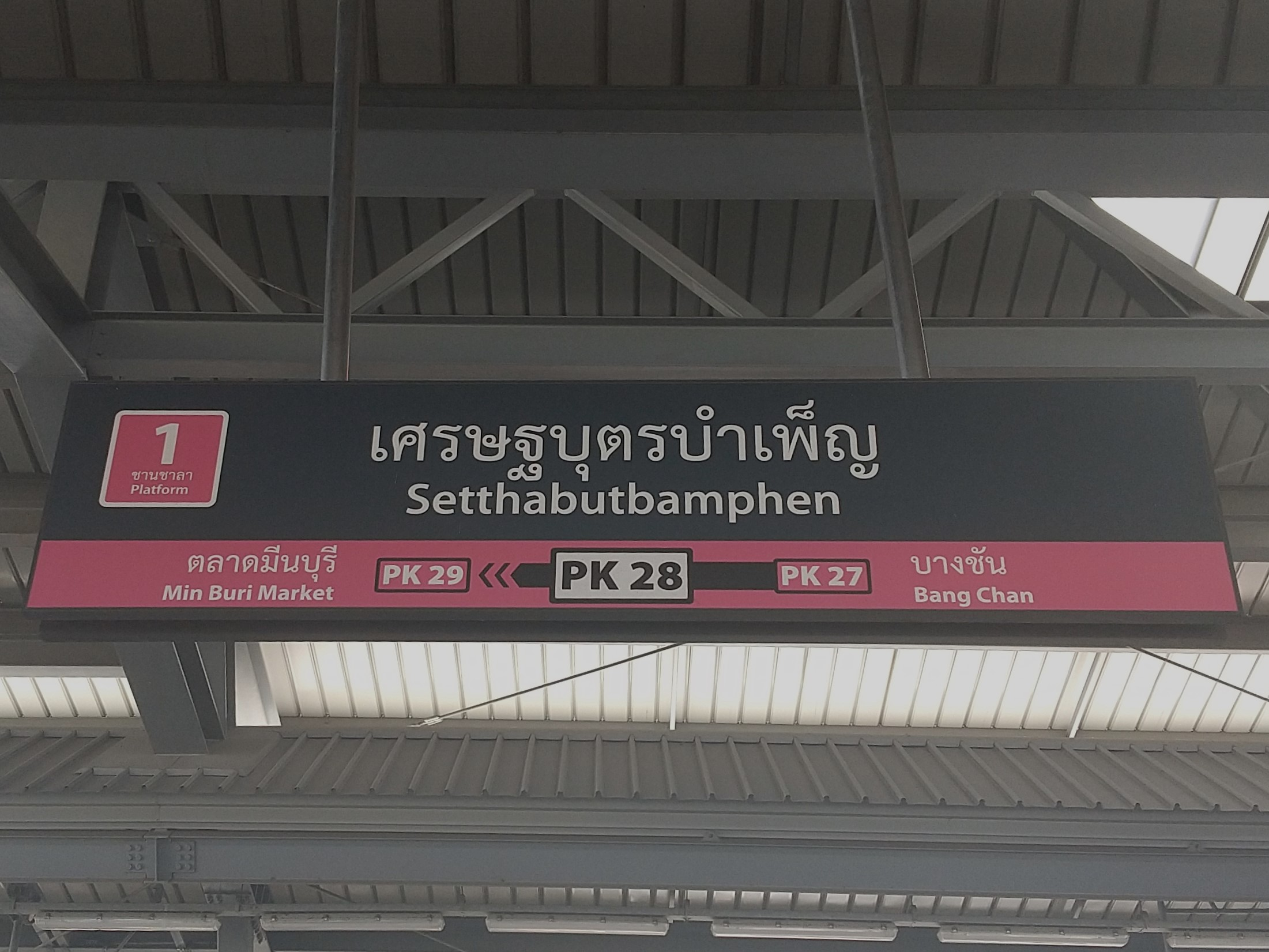
Signage

Setthabutbamphen station (Thai: สถานีเศรษฐบุตรบำเพ็ญ) is a Bangkok MRT station on the Pink Line. The station is located on Ram Inthra Road, near Soi Ram Inthra 123 in Min Buri district, Bangkok. The station has four exits and is named after Setthabutbamphen School located nearby. It opened on 21 November 2023 as part of trial operations on the entire Pink Line.
