= Government Complex MRT station =

Railway station in Bangkok, Thailand

Government Complex ศูนย์ราชการเฉลิมพระเกียรติ
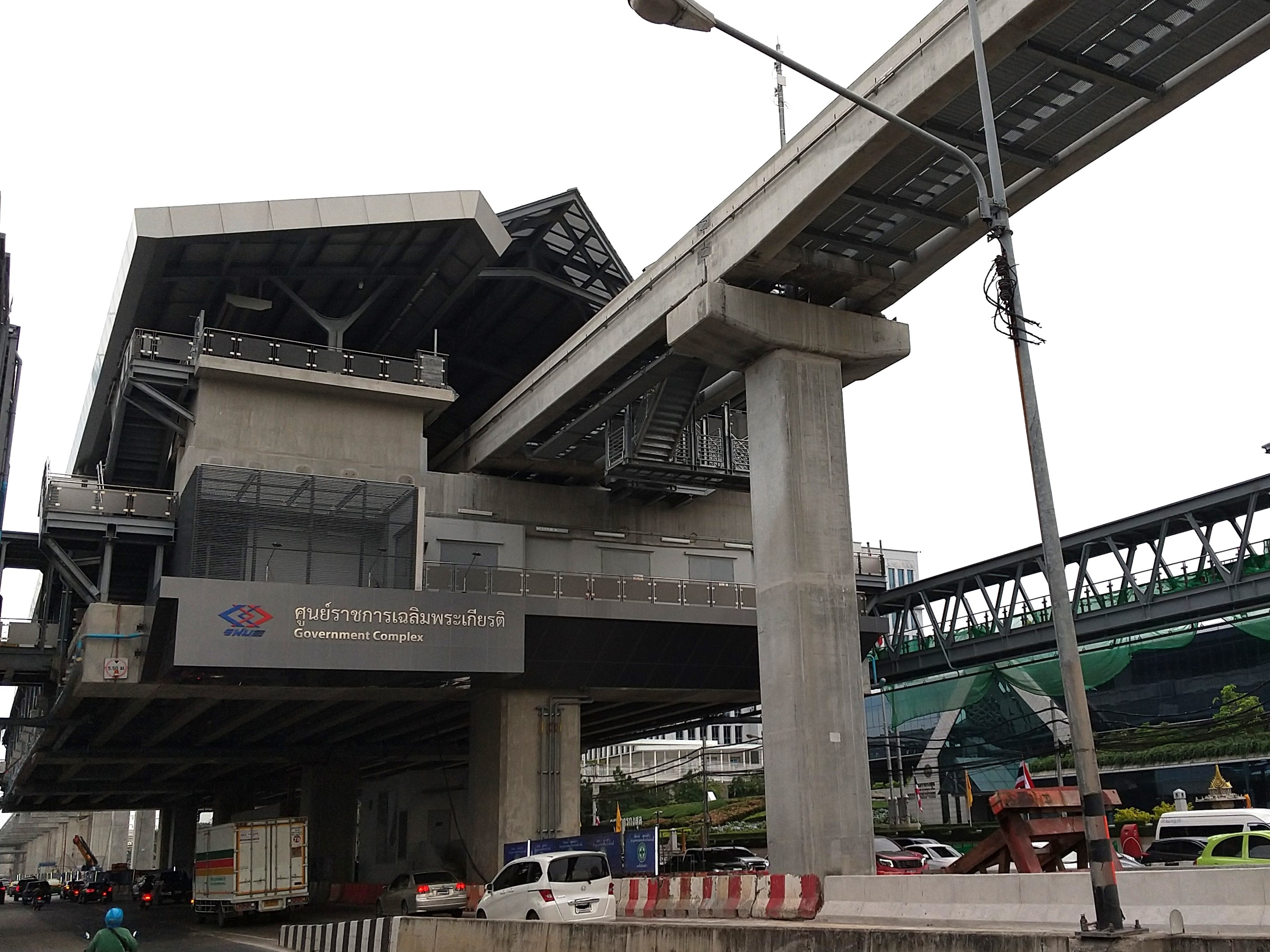

General information
- Location: Lak Si District, Bangkok, Thailand
- System: MRT
- Owner: Mass Rapid Transit Authority of Thailand (MRTA)
- Operator: Northern Bangkok Monorail Company Limited
- Line: Pink Line

Other information
- Station code: PK12

History
- Opened: 21 November 2023

Services
Preceding station	Metropolitan Rapid Transit	Following station
Chaeng Watthana 14 towards Nonthaburi Civic Center	Pink Line	National Telecom towards Min Buri
Location

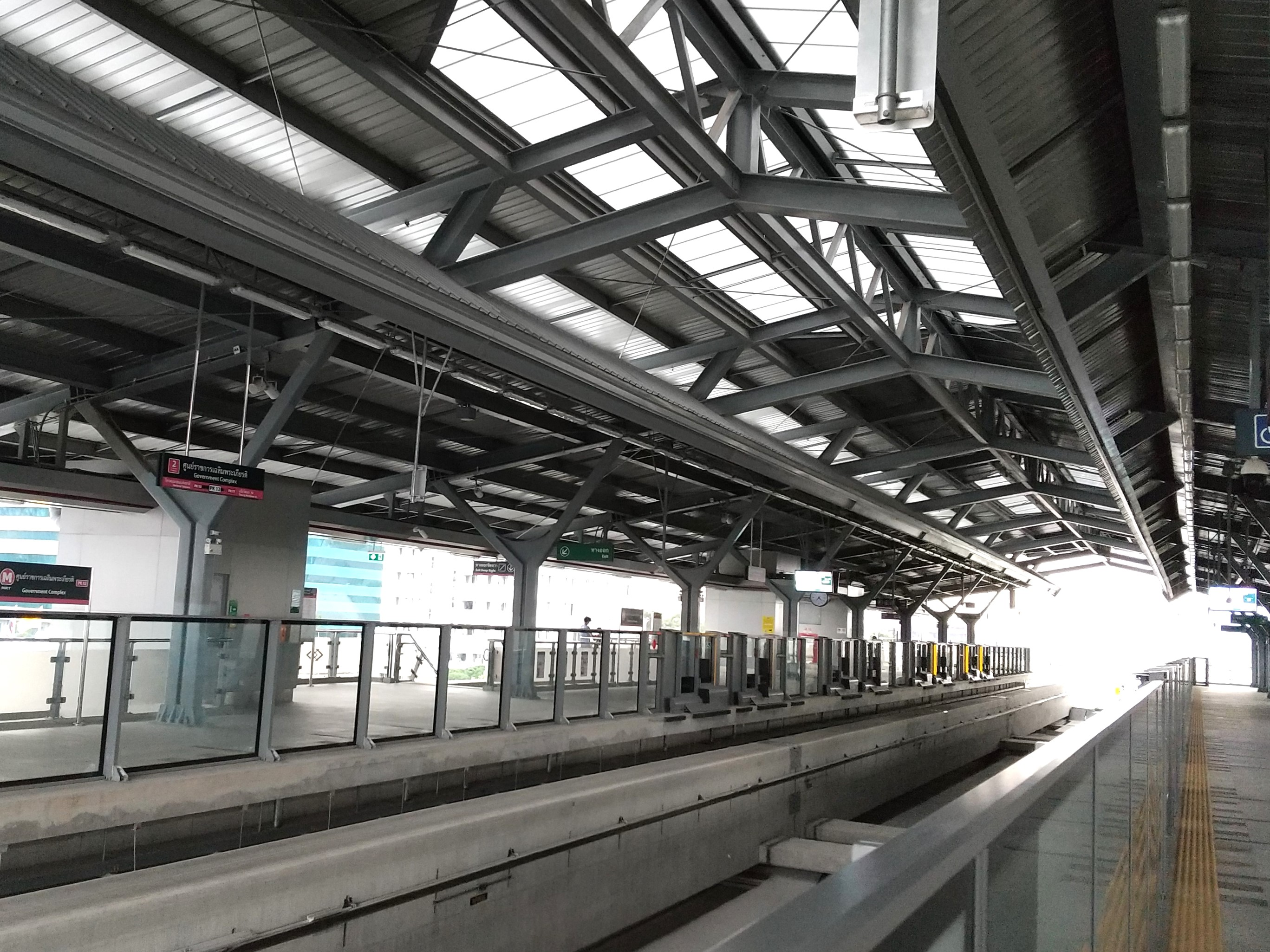
Platforms

Government Complex station (Thai: สถานีศูนย์ราชการเฉลิมพระเกียรติ, RTGS: Sathani Sun Ratchakan Chaloem Phrakiat) is a Bangkok MRT station on the Pink Line. The station is located on Chaeng Watthana Road, near the Chaeng Watthana Government Complex in Lak Si district, Bangkok. The station has four exits. It opened on 21 November 2023 as part of trial operations on the entire Pink Line.
