= Pak Kret Bypass MRT station =

Railway station in Nonthaburi, Thailand

Pak Kret Bypass เลี่ยงเมืองปากเกร็ด
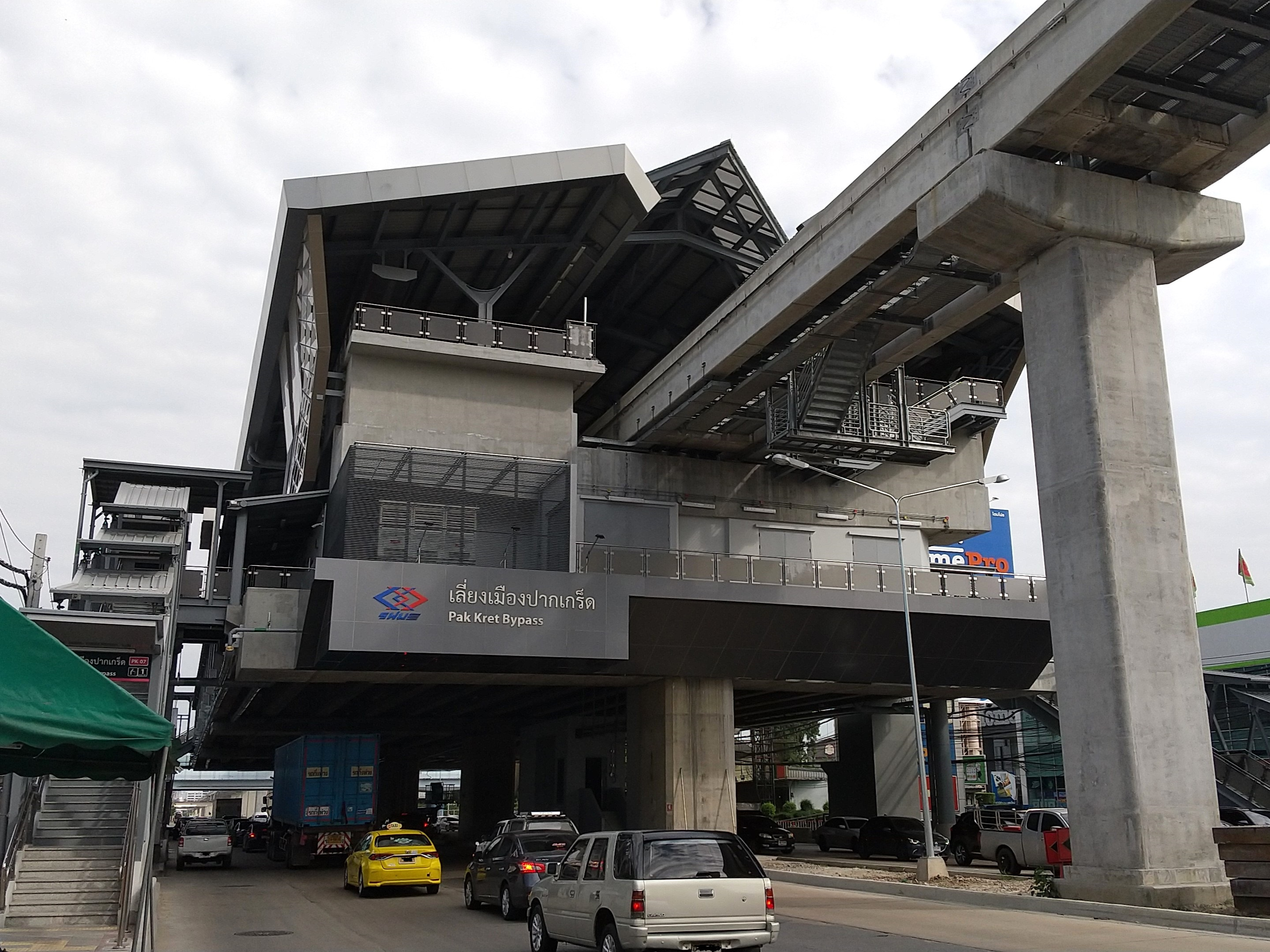

General information
- Location: Pak Kret District, Nonthaburi province, Thailand
- Coordinates: 13.9065°N 100.5155°E
- System: MRT
- Owner: Mass Rapid Transit Authority of Thailand (MRTA)
- Operator: Northern Bangkok Monorail Company Limited
- Line: Pink Line

Other information
- Station code: PK07

History
- Opened: 21 November 2023

Services
Preceding station	Metropolitan Rapid Transit	Following station
Yaek Pak Kret towards Nonthaburi Civic Center	Pink Line	Chaeng Watthana - Pak Kret 28 towards Min Buri
Location

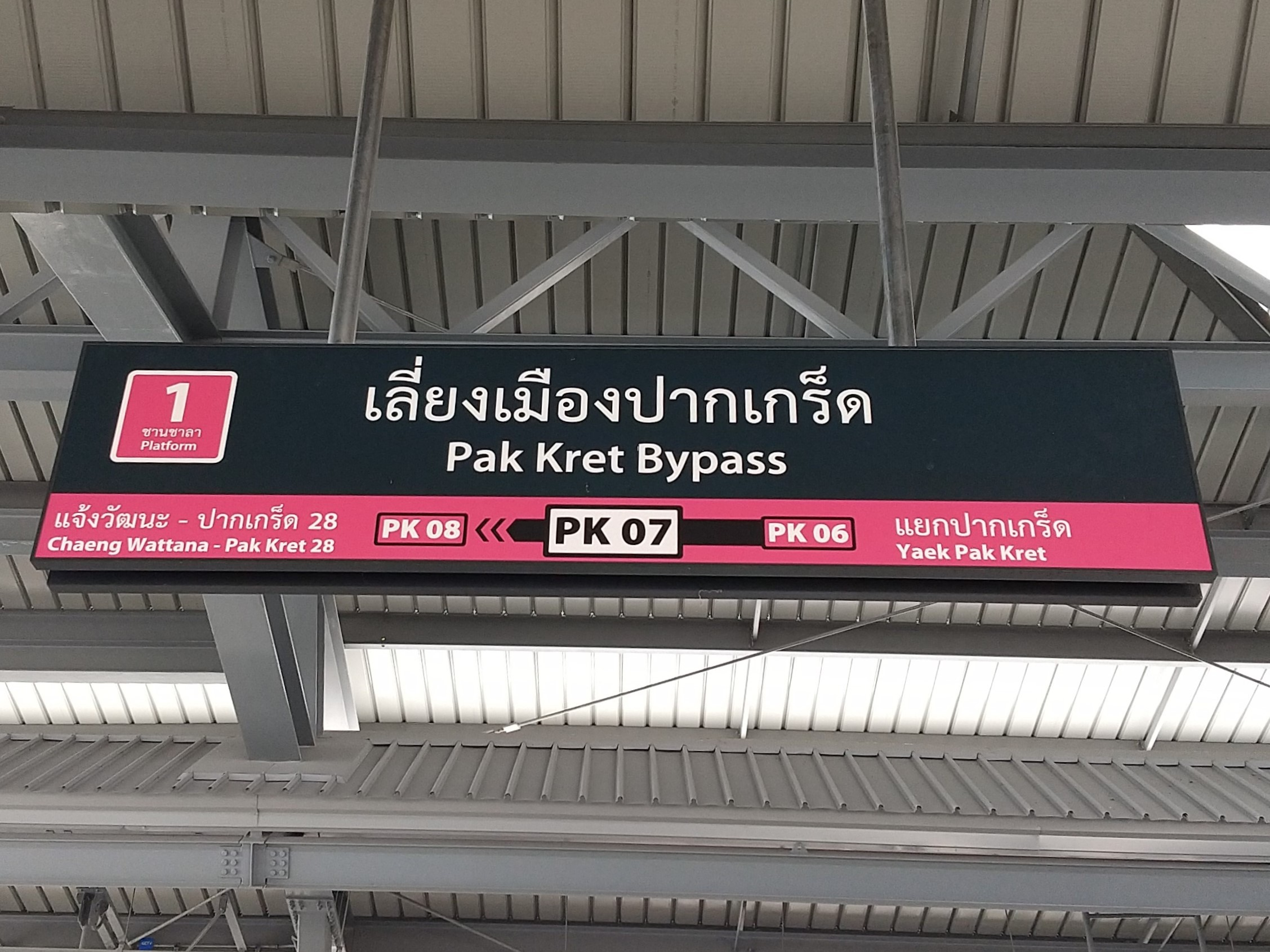
Signage

Pak Kret Bypass station (Thai: สถานีเลี่ยงเมืองปากเกร็ด, RTGS: Sathani Liang Mueang Pak Kret) is a Bangkok MRT station on the Pink Line. Located on Chaeng Watthana Road, near Pak Kret Bypass Road (Highway 3105) in Pak Kret district, Nonthaburi province, the station has four exits. It opened on 21 November 2023 as part of trial operations on the entire Pink Line.
