= Yaek Pak Kret MRT station =

Railway station in Nonthaburi, Thailand

Yaek Pak Kret แยกปากเกร็ด
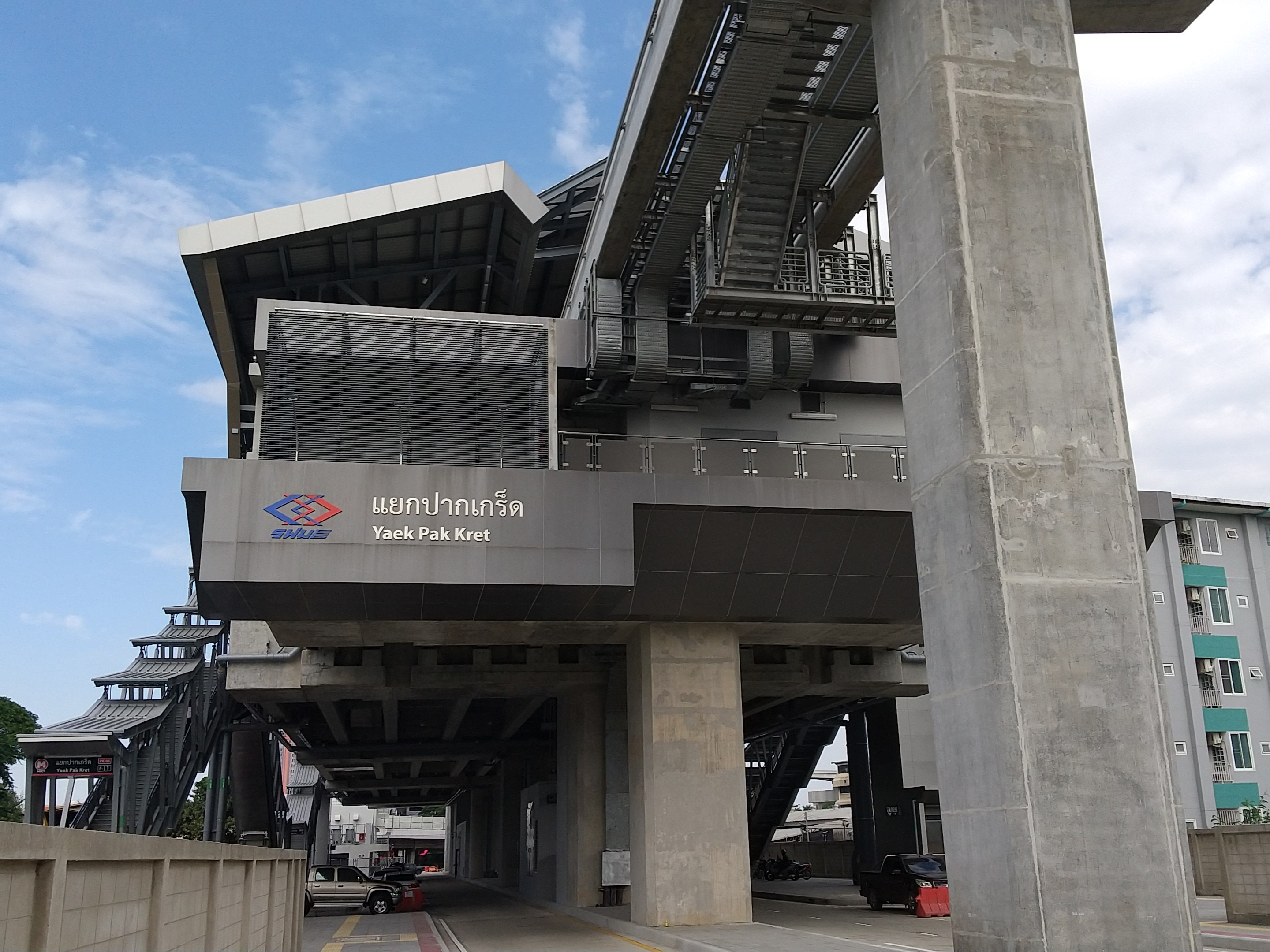

General information
- Location: Pak Kret District, Nonthaburi province, Thailand
- Coordinates: 13.9063°N 100.5054°E
- System: MRT
- Owner: Mass Rapid Transit Authority of Thailand (MRTA)
- Operator: Northern Bangkok Monorail Company Limited
- Line: Pink Line

Other information
- Station code: PK06

History
- Opened: 21 November 2023

Services
Preceding station	Metropolitan Rapid Transit	Following station
Royal Irrigation Department towards Nonthaburi Civic Center	Pink Line	Pak Kret Bypass towards Min Buri
Location

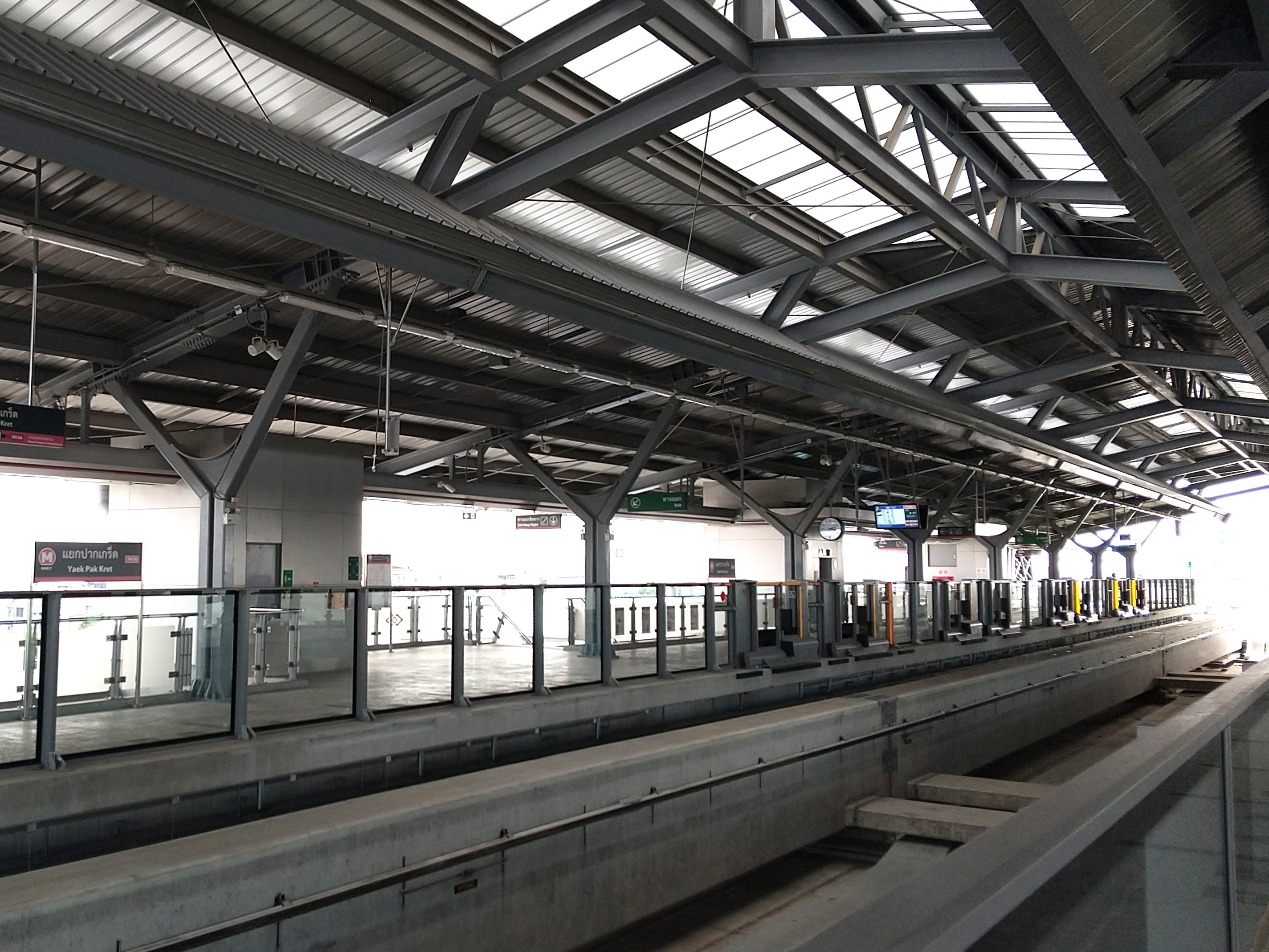
Platforms

Yaek Pak Kret station (Thai: สถานีแยกปากเกร็ด) is a Bangkok MRT station on the Pink Line. The station is located on Chaeng Watthana Road in Pak Kret district, Nonthaburi province. The station has four exits and is the closest station for Pak Kret city municipality. It opened on 21 November 2023 as part of trial operations on the entire Pink Line.
