= Lake Muang Thong Thani MRT station =

Monorail line in Greater Bangkok

Lake Muang Thong Thani ทะเลสาบเมืองทองธานี
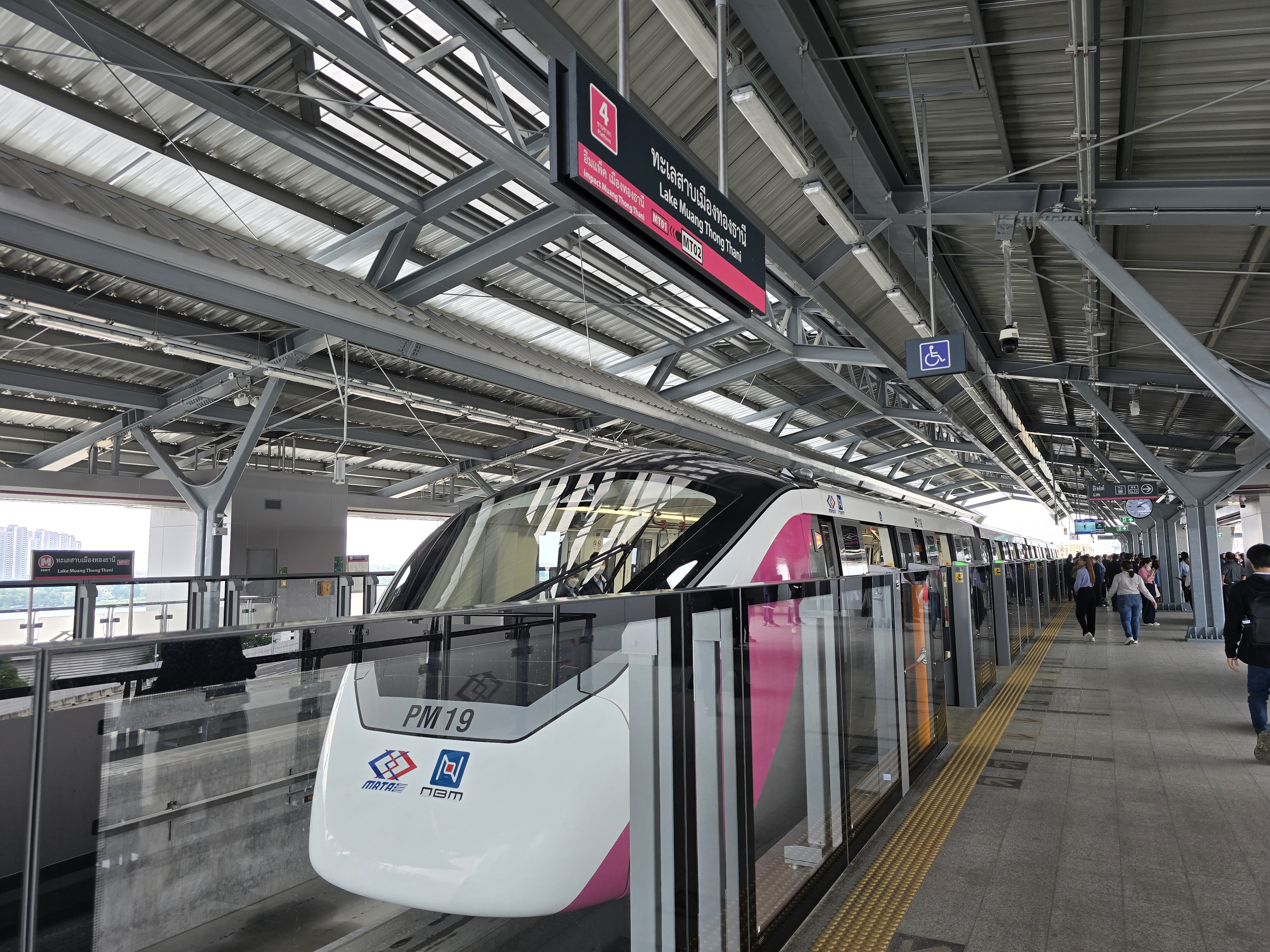
- Pink Line station

General information
- Coordinates: 13.9183°N 100.5457°E
- System: MRT
- Owner: Mass Rapid Transit Authority of Thailand (MRTA)
- Operator: Northern Bangkok Monorail Company Limited
- Line: Pink Line

Other information
- Station code: MT02

History
- Opened: 20 May 2025
Location

Lake Muang Thong Thani station (Note: Thai: สถานีทะเลสาบเมืองทองธานี) (station code MT02) is a Bangkok MRT station on the Pink Line extension to Muang Thong Thani, commonly known as Muang Thong Thani Line. The station is located above Soi Chaengwattana-Pak Kret 39, near the Impact Lakeside event space, Thunderdome Stadium and Thunderdome. It is the terminus of the Muang Thong Thani spur line. Trains arrive to this station every 10 minutes normally, but every 5 minutes during rush hour or when there are events. The station has 4 exits.

== History ==
Construction of the station (along with the rest of the extension), which was wholly funded by Northern Bangkok Monorail, the construction and operation concessionaire for the main Pink Line, began in June 2022. It opened to the public for a trial run on 20 May 2025, with full commercial service expected to begin on 17 June 2025."
