= Nopparat MRT station =

Train station in Bangkok, Thailand

Nopparat นพรัตน์
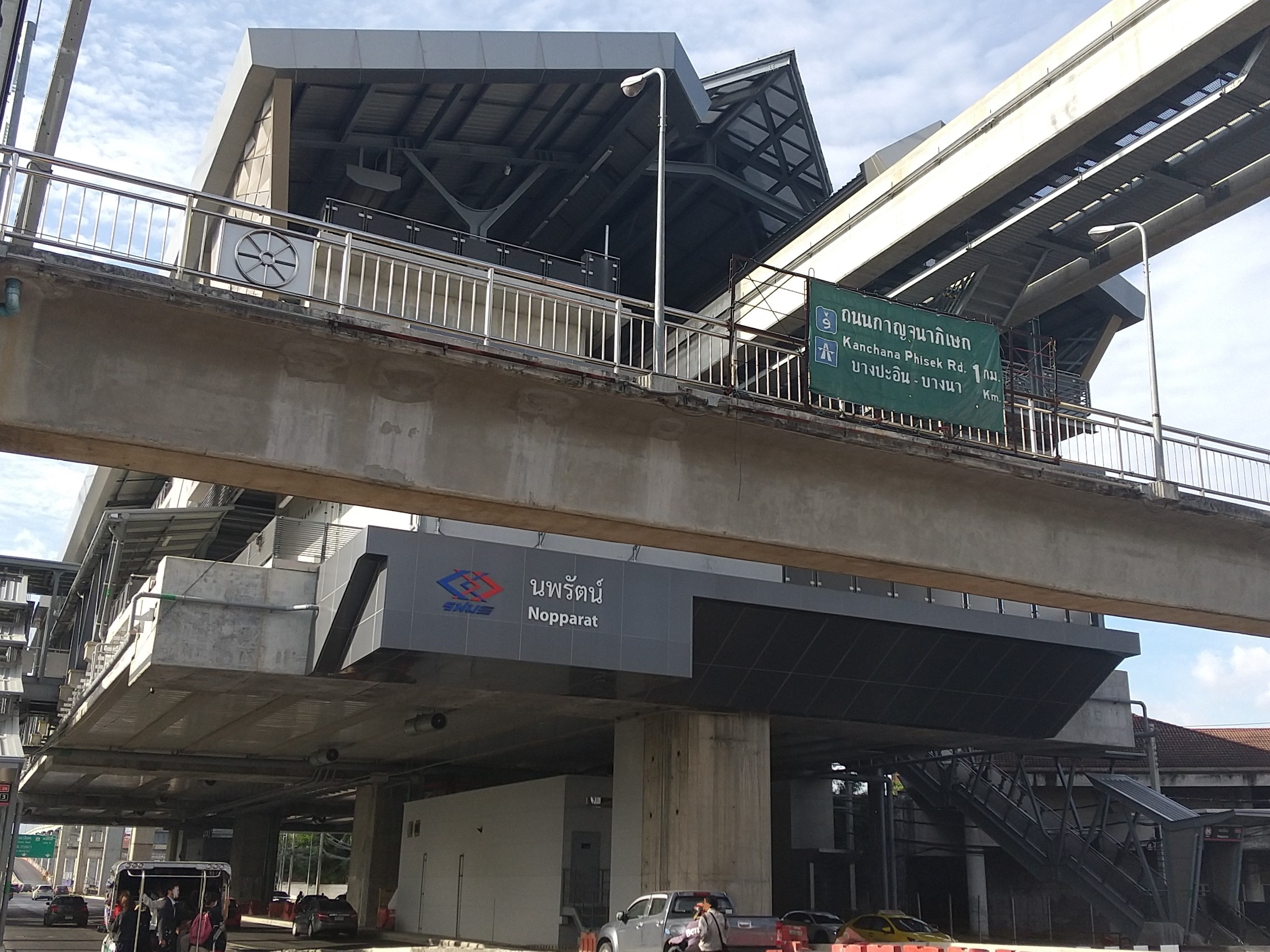

General information
- Location: Khan Na Yao District, Bangkok, Thailand
- System: MRT
- Owner: Mass Rapid Transit Authority of Thailand (MRTA)
- Operator: Northern Bangkok Monorail Company Limited
- Line: Pink Line

Other information
- Station code: PK26

History
- Opened: 21 November 2023

Services
Preceding station	Metropolitan Rapid Transit	Following station
Outer Ring Road - Ram Inthra towards Nonthaburi Civic Center	Pink Line	Bang Chan towards Min Buri
Location

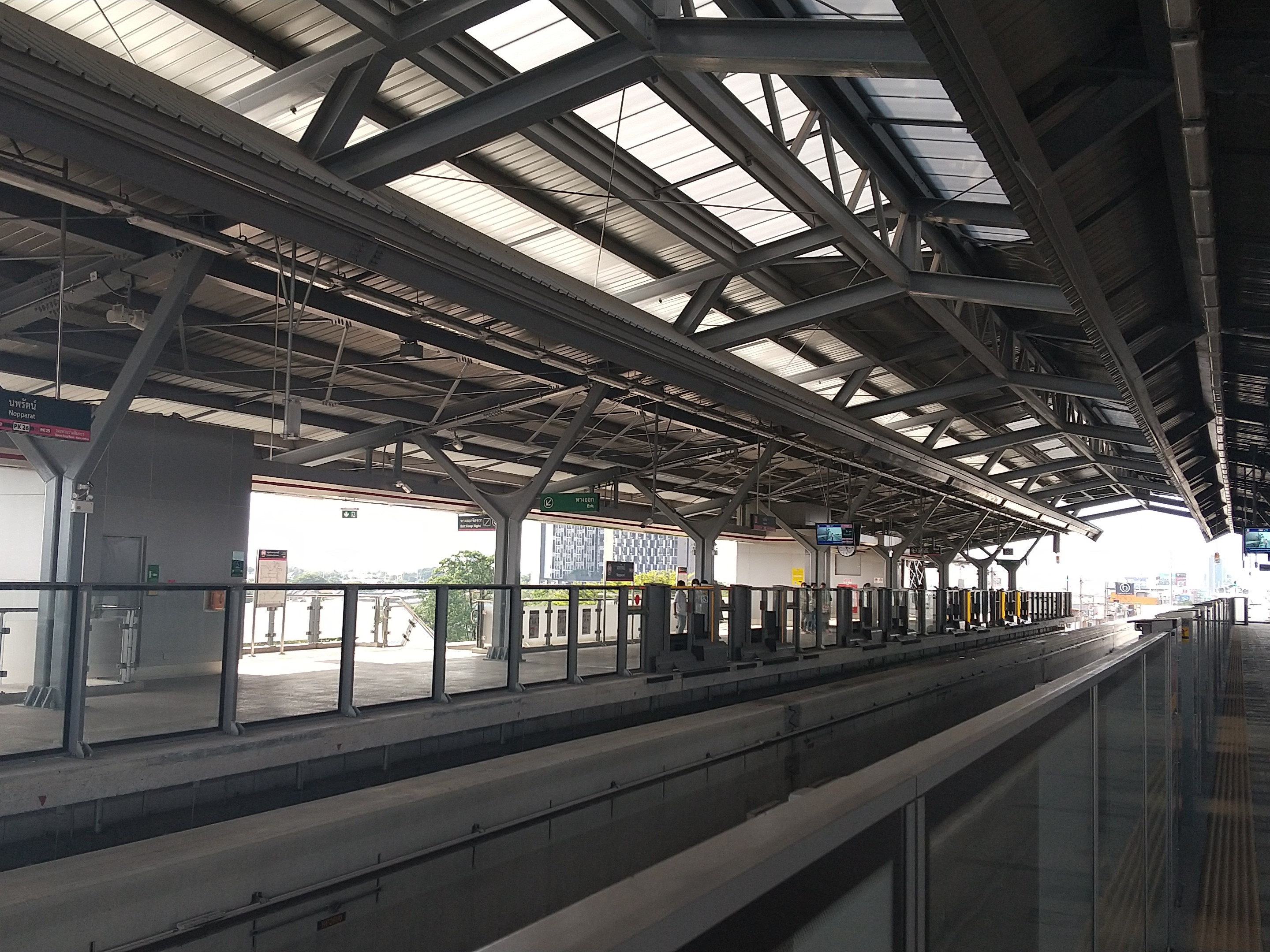
Platforms

Nopparat station (Thai: สถานีนพรัตน์, RTGS: Sathani Noppharat) is a Bangkok MRT station on the Pink Line. The station is located on Ram Inthra Road, near Nopparat Rajathanee Hospital in Khan Na Yao district, Bangkok. The station has four exits. It opened on 21 November 2023 as part of trial operations on the entire Pink Line.
