= Nopparat Rajathanee Hospital =

Nopparat Rajathanee Hospital โรงพยาบาลนพรัตนราชธานี
- Department of Medical Services. MOPH

Geography
- Location: 679 Ram Inthra Road Kilometer 13, Khan Na Yao Subdistrict, Khan Na Yao, Bangkok 10230, Thailand
- Coordinates: 13.817454°N 100.688026°E

Organisation
- Type: Teaching
- Affiliated university: College of Medicine, Rangsit University; Faculty of Medicine Siriraj Hospital, Mahidol University; Faculty of Medicine, Srinakharinwirot University; Phramongkutklao College of Medicine

Services
- Beds: 510

History
- Founded: 2 January 1982 (Outpatient); 1 October 1982 (Inpatient)

Links
- Website: www.nopparat.go.th/nrhweb62/index.php
- Lists: Hospitals in Thailand

Nopparat Rajathanee Hospital (Thai: โรงพยาบาลนพรัตนราชธานี) is a hospital located in Khan Na Yao District, Bangkok, Thailand. It is a primary teaching hospital for the College of Medicine, Rangsit University. It is also an affiliated teaching hospital of the Faculty of Medicine Siriraj Hospital, Mahidol University, the Faculty of Medicine, Srinakharinwirot University, and Phramongkutklao College of Medicine.

== History ==
In 1967, due to the rapid population growth of the Bangkok Metropolitan Area, a suburban hospital was proposed in order to increase healthcare access to the people. This "Bangkok Suburban Hospital" Project was approved in 1972 and construction preparations began in 1973. Construction was halted in 1974 due to a change in department policy and was restarted in 1977. The outpatient department opened on 2 January 1982 and the inpatient department opened on 1 October that same year. The hospital was named Nopparat Rajathanee Hospital by King Bhumibol Adulyadej.

Over the years, Nopparat Rajathanee Hospital has been affiliated to many medical schools throughout Thailand. However, in 2021, the hospital cooperated with the College of Medicine, Rangsit University to provide medical education where students would be mainly based here.

It was served by Nopparat MRT station on the MRT Pink Line since 21 November 2023.

== See also ==
- Health in Thailand
- Hospitals in Thailand
- List of hospitals in Thailand
