= Pink Line (Bangkok) =

Monorail line in Bangkok

Pink Line สายสีชมพู

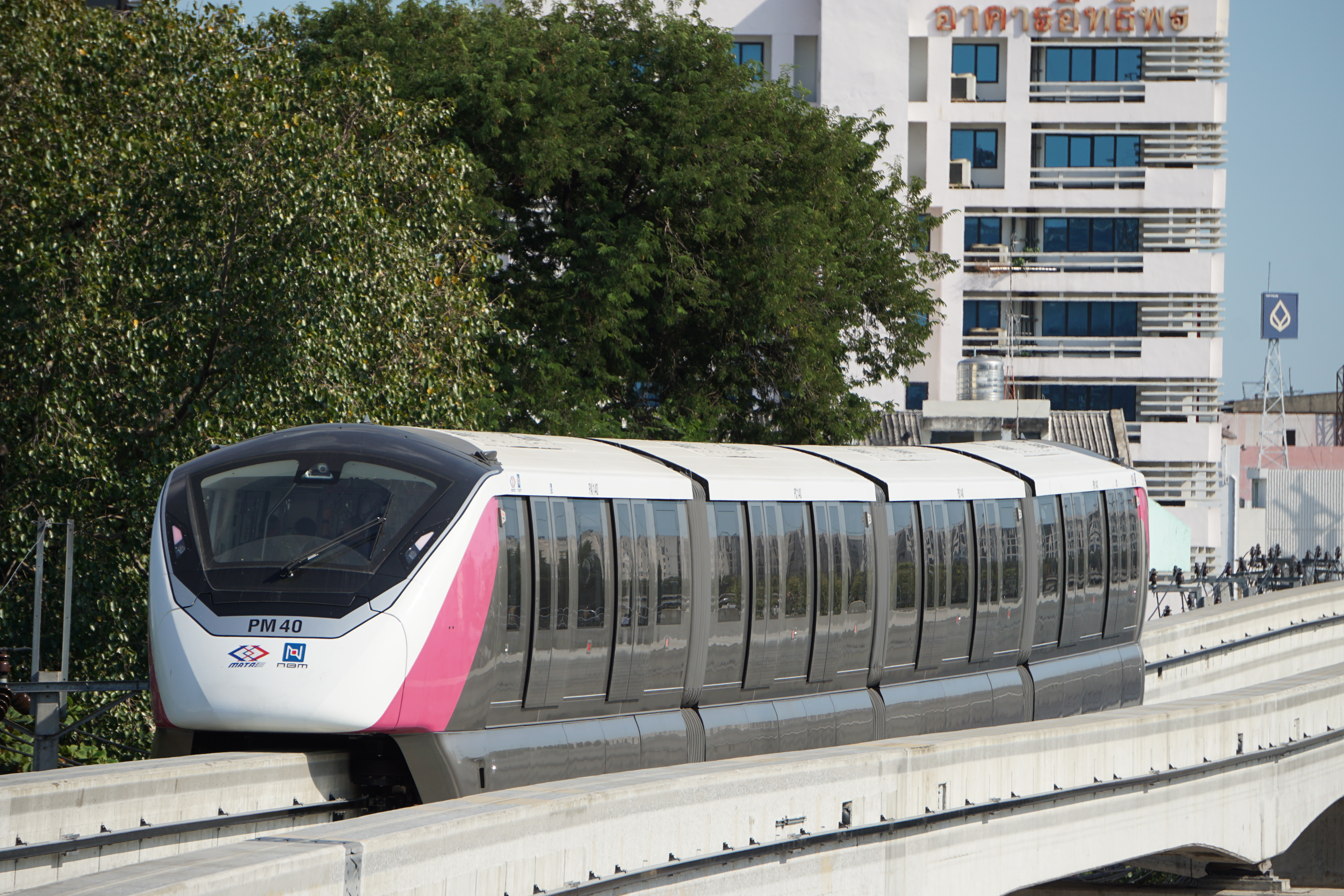
- A Pink Line Innovia Monorail 300 train at Lak Si Station

Overview
- Status: Public operation
- Owner: Mass Rapid Transit Authority of Thailand
- Locale: Nonthaburi and Bangkok, Thailand
- Termini: PK01 Nonthaburi Civic Center PK10 Muang Thong Thani; PK30 Min Buri MT02 Lake Muang Thong Thani
- Stations: 32

Service
- Type: Monorail
- System: Metropolitan Rapid Transit
- Operator(s): Northern Bangkok Monorail Company Limited (Subsidiary of BSR Consortium)
- Depot: Min Buri Depot
- Rolling stock: Alstom Innovia Monorail 300; 30 four-cars trains
- Daily ridership: 53,679 (2024)

History
- Work began: 16 June 2017; 9 years ago
- Opened: 23 November 2023; 2 years ago (Trial Run); 7 January 2024; 2 years ago (Full commercial service)
- Last extension: 20 May 2025; 17 months ago (Muang Thong Thani Line, Public Trial Operation)

Technical
- Line length: 37.30 kilometers (23.18 mi)
- Character: Fully Elevated
- Electrification: 750 V DC Third rail
- Operating speed: 80 km/h (50 mph)
- Signalling: Bombardier CITYFLO 650 moving block CBTC ATC under ATO GoA 4 (Fully Automated Train Control), with subsystems of ATP, ATS and CBI

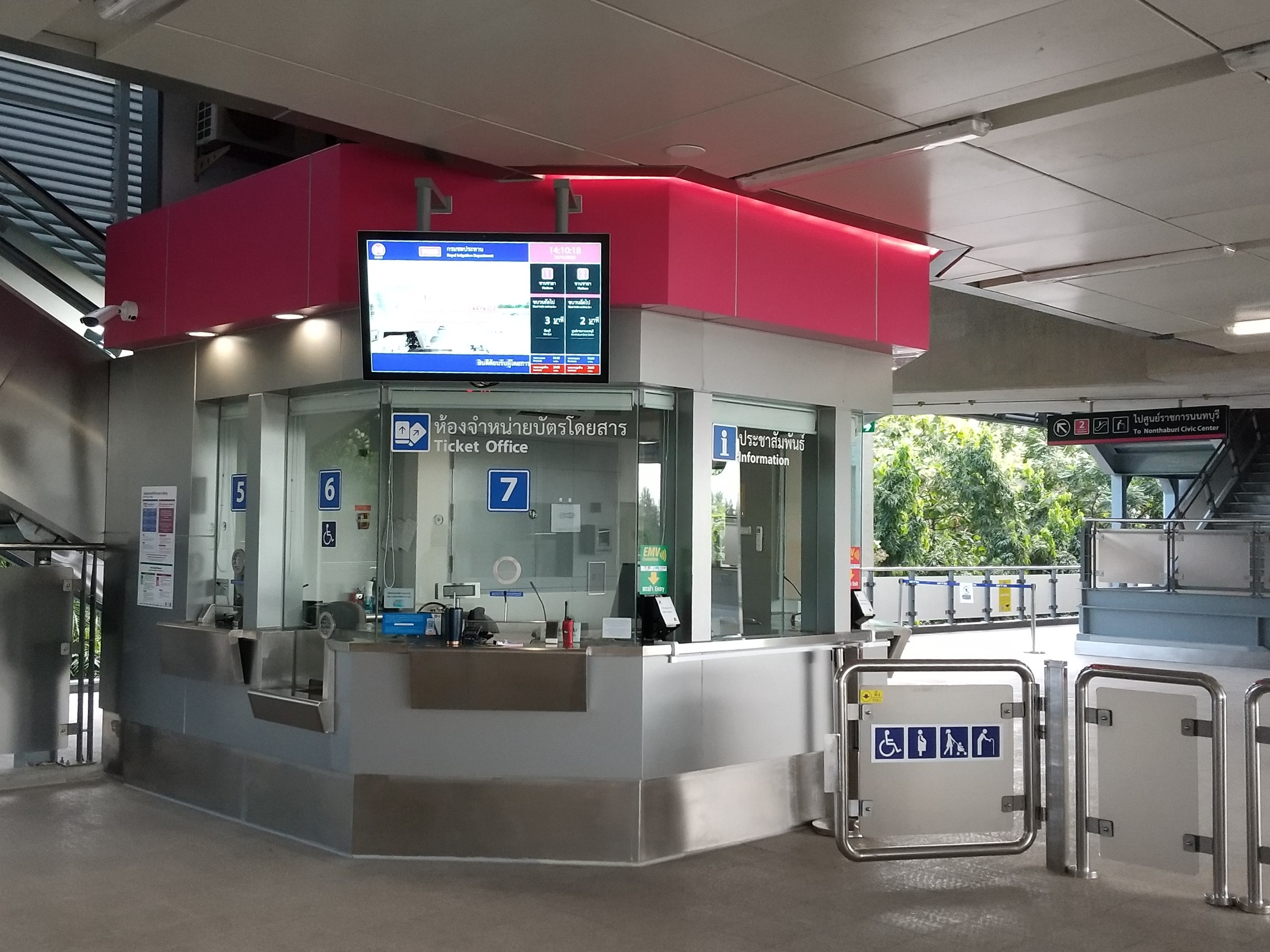
A typical ticket office of the Pink Line

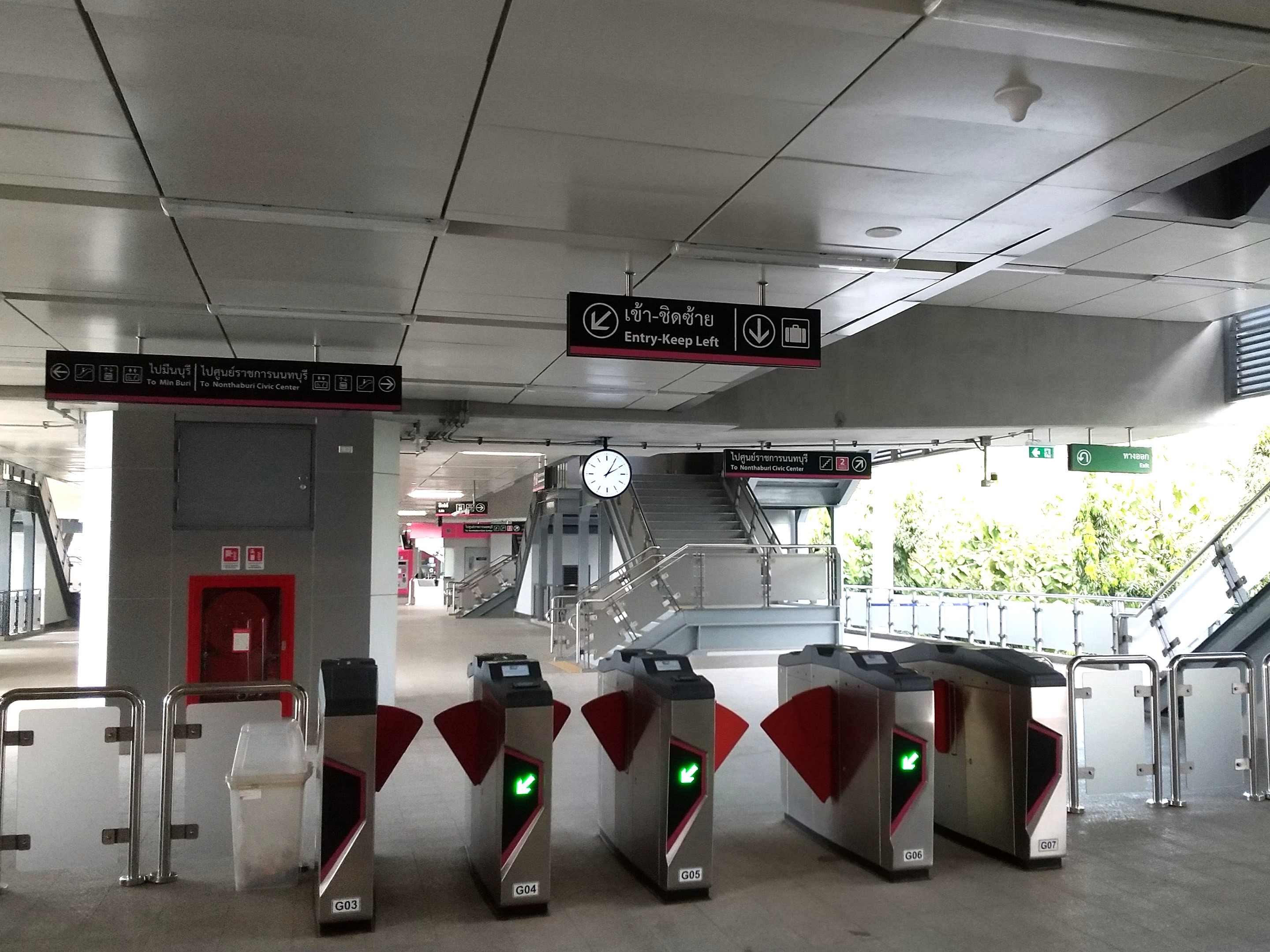
Fare gates in Royal Irrigation Department Station

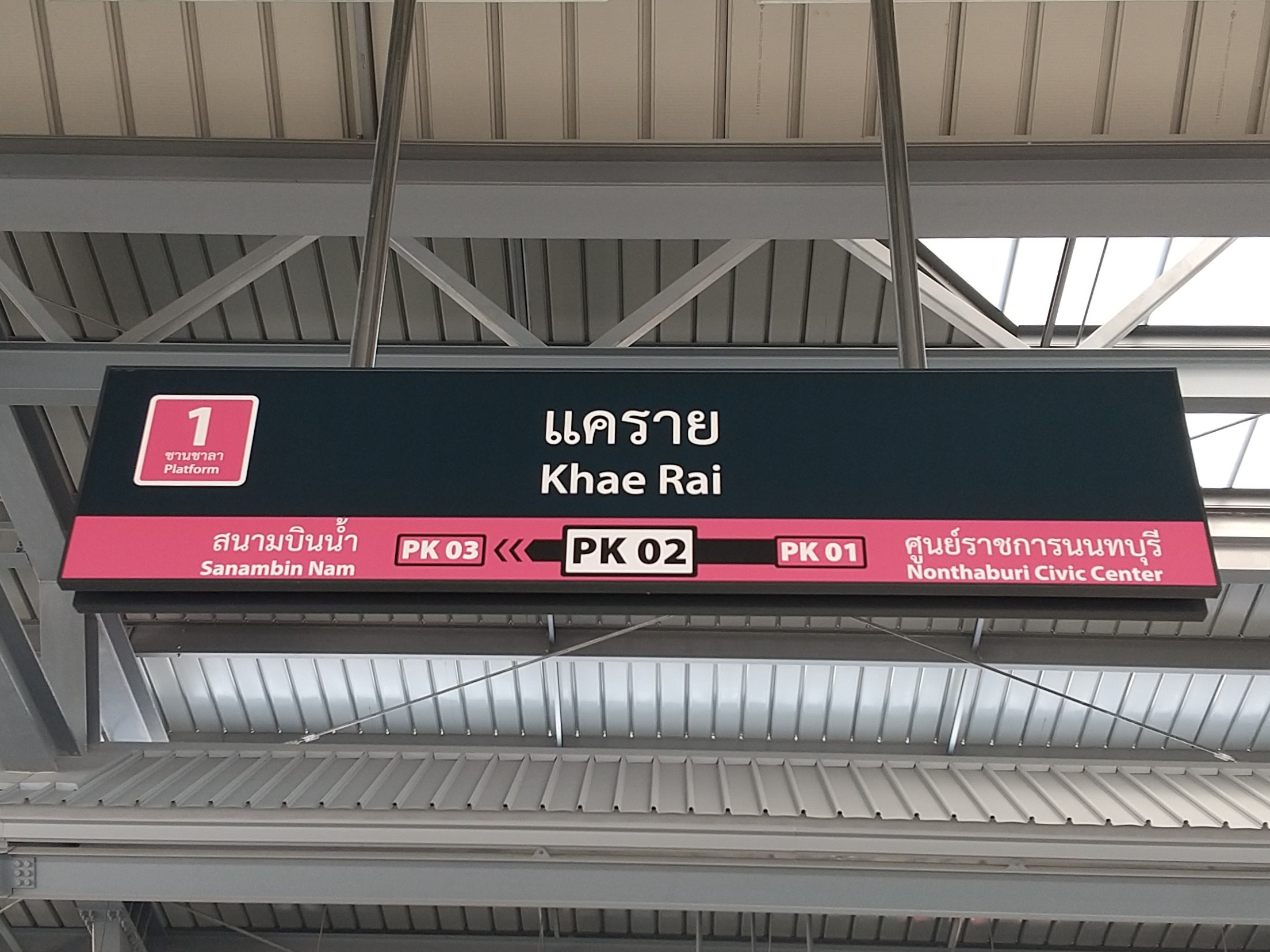
Signage at Khae Rai Station

The MRT Pink Line (Thai: รถไฟฟ้ามหานคร สายสีชมพู) or MRT Wiwat Nakhon Line (Thai: รถไฟฟ้ามหานคร สายวิวัฒน์นคร) is an elevated monorail line of the MRT in Bangkok and Nonthaburi Province, Thailand. The monorail line is 34.5 kilometres (21.4 mi) long and has 30 stations. It runs in the northern part of the Bangkok Metropolitan Area from Nonthaburi Civic Center in Mueang Nonthaburi district, Nonthaburi along the major east–west transport corridor of Highway 304 (Chaeng Wattana and Ram Inthra roads) to terminate at Min Buri in Min Buri district in east Bangkok. It opened for free public trial operation on 21 November 2023 with then Prime Minister Srettha Thavisin taking the inaugural ride.

The line is designed to link the northern areas of Bangkok and Nonthaburi by connecting with three existing and three future mass transit lines. At Nonthaburi Civic Center the line interchanges with the MRT Purple Line and the proposed MRT Brown Line. The line also interchanges with the SRT Dark Red Line, the BTS Sukhumvit Line and the planned BMA Grey Line. At the Min Buri terminus, the line interchanges with the MRT Orange Line.

Construction of the Pink Line began in December 2017. In October 2020, the BSR consortium stated that they aimed to open the first section of the Pink Line by October 2021, with services initially operating from Min Buri (PK30) to Government Complex (PK12). The complete line was originally set to be fully open by June 2022. However, the outbreak of COVID-19 in Bangkok and changes to station locations delayed the opening date. On 24 September 2021, the MRTA Board granted a 290-day extension to the construction contract period. In November 2021, the MRTA Board approved a new phased opening of the line starting from August 2022. On 9 December 2021, daily testing conducted at a maximum speed of 25 km/h (16 mph) began on a short 4 km (2.5 mi) section of the line between the depot at Min Buri and Bang Chan station. After a period of 3 months, testing was conducted at higher speeds and along a longer section of track.

In April 2022, the acting Director-General of the Department of Rail Transport stated that the line would not begin full testing until September 2022 and that the first stage would not open until late December 2022. In May 2023, a further 345-day extension was announced by the MRTA, delaying the start of trial operations for the initial section and later the final opening of the full line to June 2024. However, after the opening of the MRT Yellow line the BSR announced that the first section of the line would open in November 2023.

The line opened for free public trial operation on 21 November 2023 and officially launched on 18 December 2023. Revenue service was initially scheduled to begin on 3 January 2024, but an incident involving conductor rails resulted in a delay to 7 January, with a 15 percent discount for travels between Royal Irrigation Department and Min Buri, and the first four stations will be free of charge, running only in one direction on rails unaffected by the incident as a shuttle service, while the affected rails are being repaired.

On 20 May 2025, Muang Thong Thani Line, a branch line from the main Pink Line, began free trial operations between Muang Thong Thani and Lake Muang Thong Thani stations. The branch opened on 17 June 2025.

== Route alignment ==
The line begins at Nonthaburi Civic Center near Khae Rai Junction, Nonthaburi Province, in the northwest of Greater Bangkok. The line then heads north along Tiwanon Road to Pak Kret Intersection, Pak Kret District, before turning east to run along Chaeng Watthana road. It interchanges with the SRT Dark Red Line at Lak Si Station and passes over Vibhavadi Rangsit Road running east through the Ram Intra intersection and the Lak Si Monument in Bang Khen District, where it crosses under the BTS Sukhumvit Line and interchanges with Wat Phra Sri Mahathat. The line then continues farther east along Ram Inthra Road to the northeast of Bangkok before terminating at Min Buri station where it will interchange with the MRT Orange Line once that line opens.

== History ==
The Pink Line was first proposed in 2005 by the Office of Transport and Traffic Policy and Planning as a heavy rail underground line. It was changed to a monorail line in 2008 to reduce construction costs. The director-general of the Office of Transport and Traffic Policy and Planning had previously stated in an interview that the Pink Line was considered a priority scheme to be completed by 2017–18, as it ran past the then recently opened Bangkok Government Complex. A review was undertaken in early 2012 to reconsider the heavy rail option, but cost restraints prevailed and the Office decided to continue with the monorail plan. The review of the line did result, however, in the addition of 6 new stations. The environmental impact assessment for the Pink Line was finalized in late 2012. In October 2012, members of the new government requested to extend the planned line east by 3.4 km (2.1 mi) beyond the Min Buri terminus to Nong Chok. However, this extension of the line was not approved. The expected cost of the line in 2012 with the additional 6 extra stations was 55 billion baht.

The Pink line was due to be tendered in the third quarter of 2013 with construction due to commence in early 2014. However, delays in preparation of the tender in relation to the selection of monorail rolling stock and political protests resulting in a snap national election in early Feb 2014 further delayed the Pink Line tender. A coup in May 2014 resulted in a new military administration and the tender being deferred while a review of all mass transit projects was undertaken for a period of 18 months. The Pink line tender was then changed to a PPP tender process which was not released until mid 2016.

The BSR consortium consisting of BTS Group Holdings (75% majority stake) with Sino-Thai Engineering and Construction (STEC), and Ratch Group (RATCH) won the bid in early December 2016 to construct and operate the Pink Line. The BSR consortium won the bid for a 30-year concession operate the line and also won the bid to build and operate the MRT Yellow Line.

On 16 June 2017, contracts were signed by the BSR consortium with the Mass Rapid Transit Authority of Thailand. The BSR established the Northern Bangkok Monorail Company Limited (NBM) to operate the line.

== Muang Thong Thani Line ==
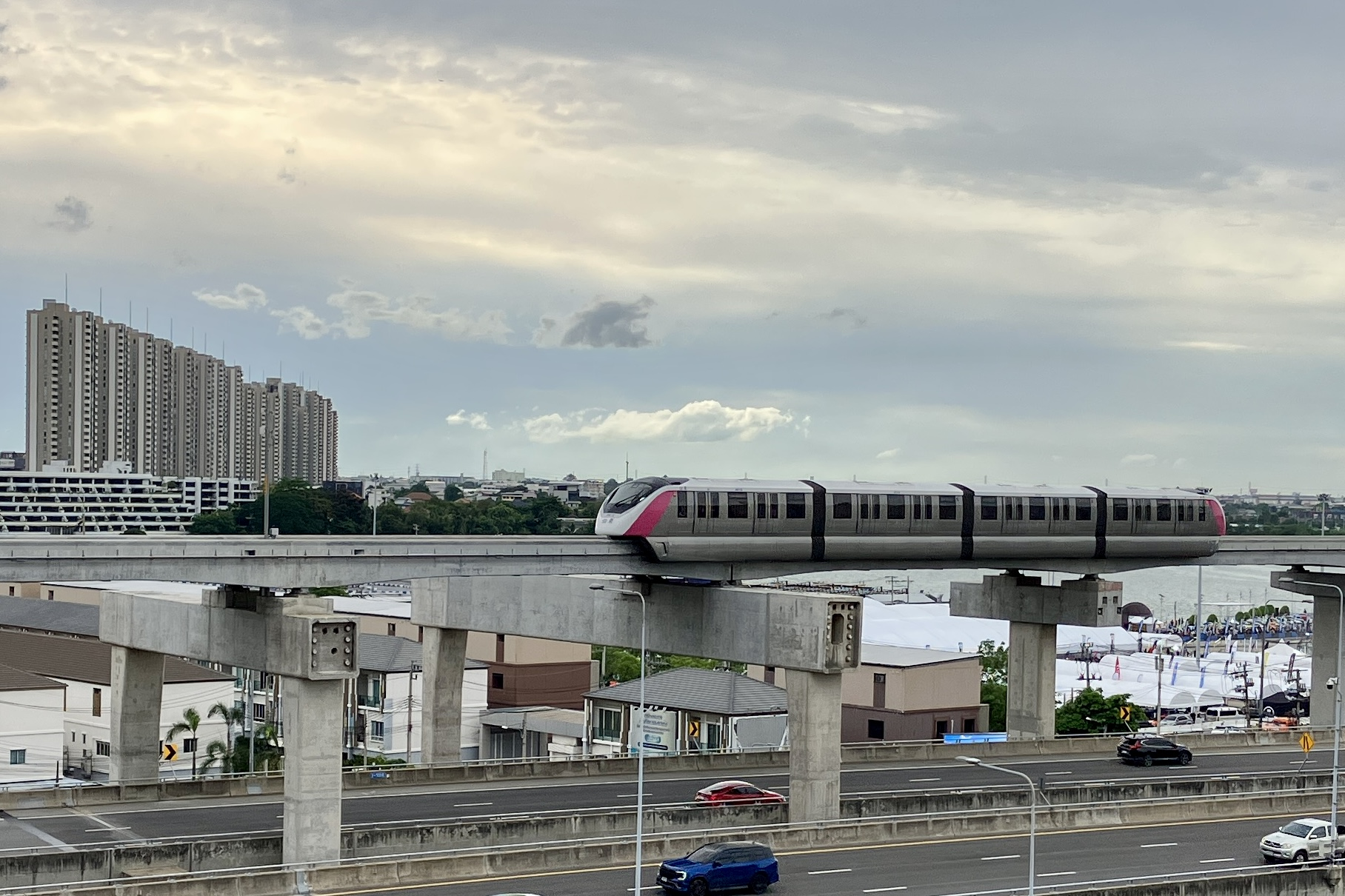
Monorail in Muang Thong Thani

The Pink Line extension to Muang Thong Thani, (Note: Thai: รถไฟฟ้าสายสีชมพู ส่วนต่อขยายเมืองทองธานี; officially known during construction as the MRT Pink Line Extension (Spur Line) Project, Si Rat – Muang Thong Thani section (โครงการรถไฟฟ้าสายสีชมพูส่วนต่อขยาย ช่วงสถานีศรีรัช-เมืองทองธานี)) or Muang Thong Thani Line, is a spur line of the Pink Line linking to the Muang Thong Thani development and its Impact exhibition and convention center.

Construction of the extension, which was wholly funded by Northern Bangkok Monorail, the construction and operation concessionaire for the main Pink Line, began in June 2022. It unofficially opened for trial runs on 20 May 2025.

=== Muang Thong Thani Line history ===
In 2016, a proposal was made to link Muang Thong Thani to the then-proposed MRT Pink Line. Accordingly, BSR Joint Venture—the consortium led by BTS Group Holdings which had won the bid to construct and operate the line—proposed a 2.8 km (1.7 mi), two-station spur monorail route to link to Impact, Muang Thong Thani from what was then Si Rat station (now Muang Thong Thani MRT station; the names were later switched). The two stations were to be located adjacent to the Impact Challenger building, and near Muang Thong Thani Lake and the Impact Forum. In early August 2018, a second public hearing was conducted by the MRTA into the extension proposal.

The spur line proposal required a new EIA, which was completed in August 2020. The proposal was then presented to the Cabinet for approval to commence construction before the end of 2020. On 22 October 2020, the National Environment Board chaired by the Deputy PM approved the EIA and the MRTA evaluated construction costs of the spur line with BSR, with the final proposal proposed to be presented to Cabinet for approval by the end of November 2020. On 9 February 2021, Cabinet approved the 2.8 km (1.7 mi) spur line which was expected to cost 3.37 billion baht, wholly contributed by BSR through its subsidiary Northern Bangkok Monorail. Construction of the spur line was due to commence in July 2021. However, due to COVID-19 outbreaks in greater Bangkok construction was delayed until after December 2021. Finally, on 20 June 2022 the MRTA issued a Notice to Proceed for the now 4.2 billion baht spur line and soon after construction commenced.

The construction marked the first business partnership between BTS Group and Bangkok Land (the developer of Muang Thong Thani), each of which is controlled by members from one of two branches of the Kanjanapas family.

By the end of January 2023, civil works construction had progressed to 16.15%. By the end of May 2023, construction had progressed to 27.77%. The MRTA may also consider a further 2 km (1.2 mi) extension in the future from Muang Thong Thani to Tiwanon road.

The Muang Thong Thani Line (formerly unofficially known as the Impact Spur Line) opened to the public for a trial run on 20 May 2025, with full commercial service expected to begin on 17 June 2025.

=== Muang Thong Thani Line route ===
The Muang Thong Thani spur line branches off from the main Pink Line at Muang Thong Thani MRT station on Chaeng Watthana Road, where it is served by a single platform. It turns into Soi Chaengwattana-Pak Kret 39 (one of the main roads into Mueang Thong Thani) and climbs above the Udon Ratthaya Expressway to run between its two sides, along the median of Soi Chaengwattana-Pak Kret 39, Impact Muang Thong Thani station then passes above the expressway again before terminating at Lake Muang Thong Thani station. Like the main line, the Muang Thong Thani line is dual track, with switches near the Muang Thong Thani and Lake Muang Thong Thani stations to facilitate turnbacks.

== Technical ==
The line operates using the Alstom Innovia Monorail 300 rolling stock, configured in four-car trainsets. It is equipped with Bombardier Transportation’s CITYFLO 650 communications-based train control (CBTC) system. This enables fully automated, driverless operation at ATO Grade of Automation 4 (GoA 4), also known as Unattended Train Operation (UTO), supported by integrated subsystems including Automatic Train Protection (ATP), Automatic Train Supervision (ATS), and Computer-Based Interlocking (CBI).

Electrification is supplied by a third rail system along the guide-beam, supplying 750 V DC.

== List of stations ==
Originally, the line was designed with 24 stations, two of which with a park and ride facility. However, six new stations were added in mid-2012 for a total of 30 stations.

Code	Station Name		Image	Opened	Platform Type	Transfer	Notes
Code	English	Thai	Image	Opened	Platform Type	Transfer	Notes
PK01	Nonthaburi Civic Center	ศูนย์ราชการนนทบุรี		21 November 2023; 2 years ago	Side	Connecting station to MRT and MRT (future).	Exit to: • National Broadcasting and Telecommunications Commission • Nonthaburi Civic Center • Nonthaburi City Municipality Office • Esplanade Cineplex Ngamwongwan – Khae Rai • Siam Business Administration Nonthaburi Technological College • Makut Rommayasaran Park • Rattanathibet Police Station
PK02	Khae Rai	แคราย		21 November 2023; 2 years ago	Side		Exit to: • Central Chest Institute of Thailand • Lotus's Rattanathibet • Nonthaburi Provincial Land Transport Office • Nonthaburi Telecommunication Center
PK03	Sanambin Nam	สนามบินน้ำ		21 November 2023; 2 years ago	Side		Exit to: • Tansamrit Wittaya School • Army Quartermaster Department
PK04	Samakkhi	สามัคคี		21 November 2023; 2 years ago	Side		Exit to: • Flea Market - Pakret District • Chonlaprathan Songkro School • Saman Pichakornn School
PK05	Royal Irrigation Department	กรมชลประทาน		21 November 2023; 2 years ago	Side		Exit to: • Royal Irrigation Department • Chonprathan Wittaya School • Wat Cholpratarn Rangsarit • Panyananthaphikkhu Chonprathan Medical Center Srinakharinwirot University • Club Golf Course Irrigation
PK06	Yaek Pak Kret	แยกปากเกร็ด		21 November 2023; 2 years ago	Side		Exit to Major Hollywood Pak Kret
PK07	Pak Kret Bypass	เลี่ยงเมืองปากเกร็ด		21 November 2023; 2 years ago	Side		Exit to: • Big C Extra Chaeng Watthana 2 (Pak Kret) • HomePro Chaeng Watthana
PK08	Chaeng Watthana - Pak Kret 28	แจ้งวัฒนะ-ปากเกร็ด 28		21 November 2023; 2 years ago	Side		Exit to: • Central Chaengwattana • Software Park Thailand • Panyapiwat Institute of Management • THE TARA CP ALL
PK09	Si Rat	ศรีรัช		21 November 2023; 2 years ago	Island		Exit to: • Thai Watsadu Chaengwattana • Klongklua School • Mahamongkhon Chaloemphrakiat 80th Anniversary Memorial
PK10	Muang Thong Thani	เมืองทองธานี		21 November 2023; 2 years ago	Side & Island	Cross-platform interchange with Muang Thong Thani Line.	Exit to Makro Chaeng Watthana
PK11	Chaeng Watthana 14	แจ้งวัฒนะ 14		21 November 2023; 2 years ago	Side		Exit to: • Mongkutwattana Hospital • Big C Chaengwatthana 1 (Laksi) • Charn at The Avenue Chaengwatthana • TK. Palace Hotel & Convention • 11th Military District • Lotus's Chaengwattana
PK12	Government Complex	ศูนย์ราชการเฉลิมพระเกียรติ		21 November 2023; 2 years ago	Side		Exit to: • Ministry of Justice • 1st Long Range Reconnaissance Company • 1st Air Defence Brigade • Administrative Court of Thailand • Department of Consular Affairs • Department of Special Investigation • Bangkok North Municipal Court • Central Bankruptcy Court • Royal Thai Armed Forces Headquarters • Office of the Comptroller General • Centara Life Government Complex Hotel & Convention Centre Chaeng Watthana • Immigration Division 1 • Vayupak Convention Centre
PK13	National Telecom	โทรคมนาคมแห่งชาติ		21 November 2023; 2 years ago	Side		Exit to: • National Telecom Public Company Limited • Na-Nakorn Building • Lak Si District Office • Regional Office of NBTC 1
PK14	Lak Si	หลักสี่		21 November 2023; 2 years ago	Side	Connecting station to SRT .	Exit to: • IT Square Lak Si • Rattanakosin Technological College • Center for Biologics Research and Development (CBRD) • Chulabhorn Graduate Institute • Chulabhorn Hospital • Chulabhorn Research Institute
PK15	Rajabhat Phranakhon	ราชภัฏพระนคร		21 November 2023; 2 years ago	Side		Exit to: • Phranakhon Rajabhat University • MaxValu Supermarket Laksi
PK16	Wat Phra Sri Mahathat	วัดพระศรีมหาธาตุ		21 November 2023; 2 years ago	Side	Interchange station with BTS .	Exit to: • Bang Khen District Office • Bangkok Public Library Bang Khen District • Metropolitan Health and Wellness Institution • Wat Phra Sri Mahathat • Metropolitan Waterworks Authority Bang Khen • Krirk University • Thai Niyom Songkhrao School • Wat Pra Sri Mahathat Secondary Demonstration School, Phranakhon Rajabhat University
PK17	Ram Inthra 3	รามอินทรา 3		21 November 2023; 2 years ago	Side		Exit to: • Central Ramindra • KMB hospital • Royal Thai Army Golf Course • Lumpinee Boxing Stadium
PK18	Lat Pla Khao	ลาดปลาเค้า		21 November 2023; 2 years ago	Side		Exit to Big C Extra Ram Inthra
PK19	Ram Inthra Kor Mor 4	รามอินทรา ก.ม.4		21 November 2023; 2 years ago	Side		Exit to Foodland Ram Inthra
PK20	Maiyalap	มัยลาภ		21 November 2023; 2 years ago	Side		Exit to: • Office Of Inspector General • Ease Park
PK21	Vacharaphol	วัชรพล		21 November 2023; 2 years ago	Side	Connecting station to MRL (future)	Exit to: • Liab Duan Market • Vachara Phirom Park
PK22	Ram Inthra Kor Mor 6	รามอินทรา ก.ม.6		21 November 2023; 2 years ago	Side		Exit to: • Saiaksorn School • Triamwit Pattana, Pre-Medical School
PK23	Khu Bon	คู้บอน		21 November 2023; 2 years ago	Side		
PK24	Ram Inthra Kor Mor 9	รามอินทรา ก.ม.9		21 November 2023; 2 years ago	Side		Exit to Synphaet Ramintra Hospital
PK25	Outer Ring Road - Ram Inthra	วงแหวนรามอินทรา		21 November 2023; 2 years ago	Side		Exit to: • Fashion Island & The Promenade shopping malls • Kanchanaphisek Road
PK26	Nopparat	นพรัตน์		21 November 2023; 2 years ago	Side		Exit to: • Nopparat Rajathanee Hospital • Siam Amazing Park • Boromrajonani College of Nursing Napparat Vajira
PK27	Bang Chan	บางชัน		21 November 2023; 2 years ago	Side		
PK28	Setthabutbamphen	เศรษฐบุตรบำเพ็ญ		21 November 2023; 2 years ago	Side		Exit to Setthabutbamphen School
PK29	Min Buri Market	ตลาดมีนบุรี		21 November 2023; 2 years ago	Side		Exit to: • Chatuchak Weekend Market (Minburi) • Minburi Market • Minburi Technical College • Bangkok Social Security Office Area 10 • Navamin 9 Hospital
PK30	Min Buri	มีนบุรี		21 November 2023; 2 years ago	Side	Interchange station with MRT (under construction)	
Muang Thong Thani Line (Public Trial Operation)
MT01	Impact Muang Thong Thani	อิมแพ็คเมืองทองธานี		20 May 2025; 17 months ago	Island		Exit to: • Impact Arena • Kasikorn Business Technology Group • Wat Phasuk Maneechak • Sukhothai Thammathirat Open University
MT02	Lake Muang Thong Thani	ทะเลสาบเมืองทองธานี		20 May 2025; 17 months ago	Side		Exit to: • Impact Speed Park • Thunderdome Stadium • Immigration Bureau • ibis Bangkok IMPACT • Novotel Bangkok IMPACT • Cyber Crime Investigation Bureau

== Rolling stock ==
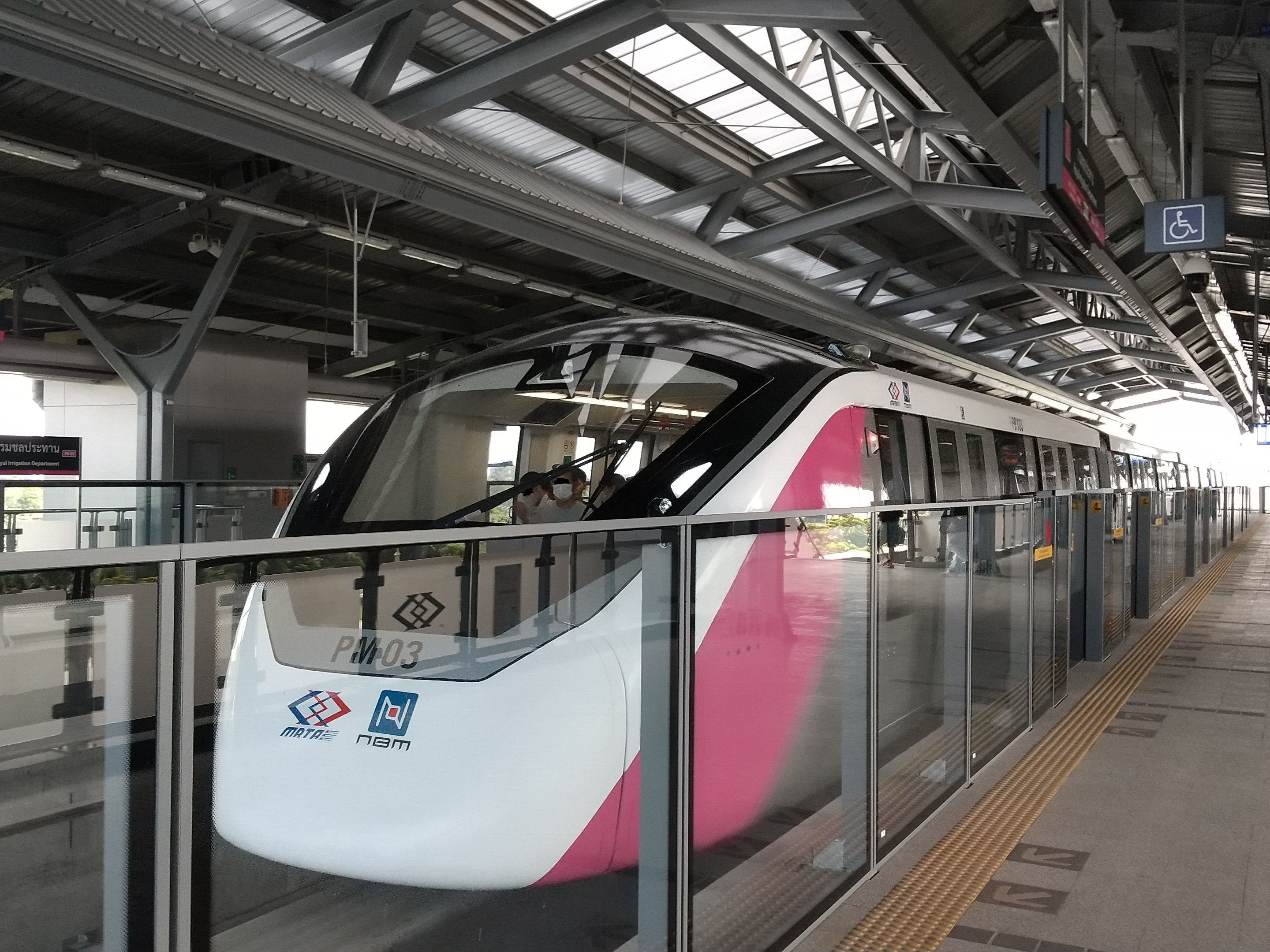
Innovia Monorail 300 rolling stock used on the Pink Line at Royal Irrigation Department Station

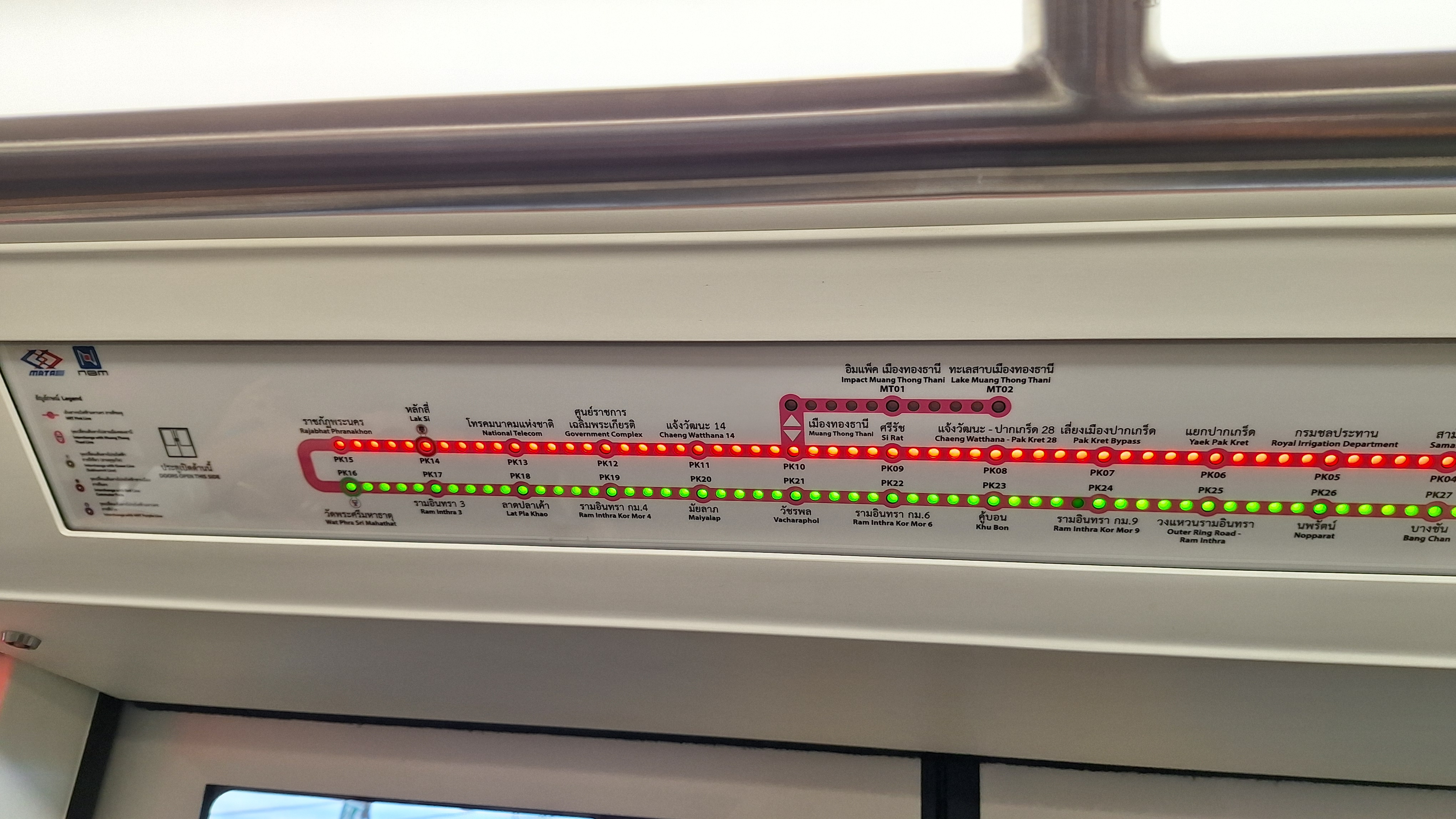
Dynamic Route Map on MRT Pink Line.

The BSR selected Bombardier Innovia Monorail 300 rolling stock for the Pink Line. The BSR announced that they will purchase 42 four-car sets to operate the line. The total order of 70 sets of trains for the Pink and Yellow lines will cost 50 billion baht. These trains will be manufactured by CRRC Puzhen Bombardier Transportation Systems (joint venture of Bombardier Transportation and CRRC Nanjing Puzhen) in Wuhu, Anhui, China. The first set was shipped on 4 September 2020 and arrived in Thailand on 1 October at Laem Chabang port with a handover ceremony attended by the then Prime Minister Prayut Chan-o-cha, the Bangkok Mass Transit System PLC. (BTSC) Chairman, MRTA and the Canadian Ambassador to Thailand. By July 2021, 8 sets had been delivered and were being tested. All sets were due to be delivered by early 2022. However, as of mid-April 2022, only 24 sets had been received and were progressively undergoing testing. The remaining sets were expected to be delivered by July 2022, but this was later delayed with the last sets delivered by early March 2023.

Technical Characteristics

- Low profile vehicles/low floor height above beam
- Distinct sloped nose/end-cap
- Inter-car walkthrough
- Rubber-tires and permanent magnet motor
- Aluminum body, steel underframe, composite end cap
- 4 car sets have a capacity of 24,100 pax p/h each way and 8 car sets a capacity of 49.600 pax p/h each way with a 75-second headway.

Innovia Monorails are all fully automated and are equipped with CITYFLO 650 communications-based train control for driverless operation to increase reliability, shorten head ways between trains and lower maintenance costs.

=== Guide beams ===
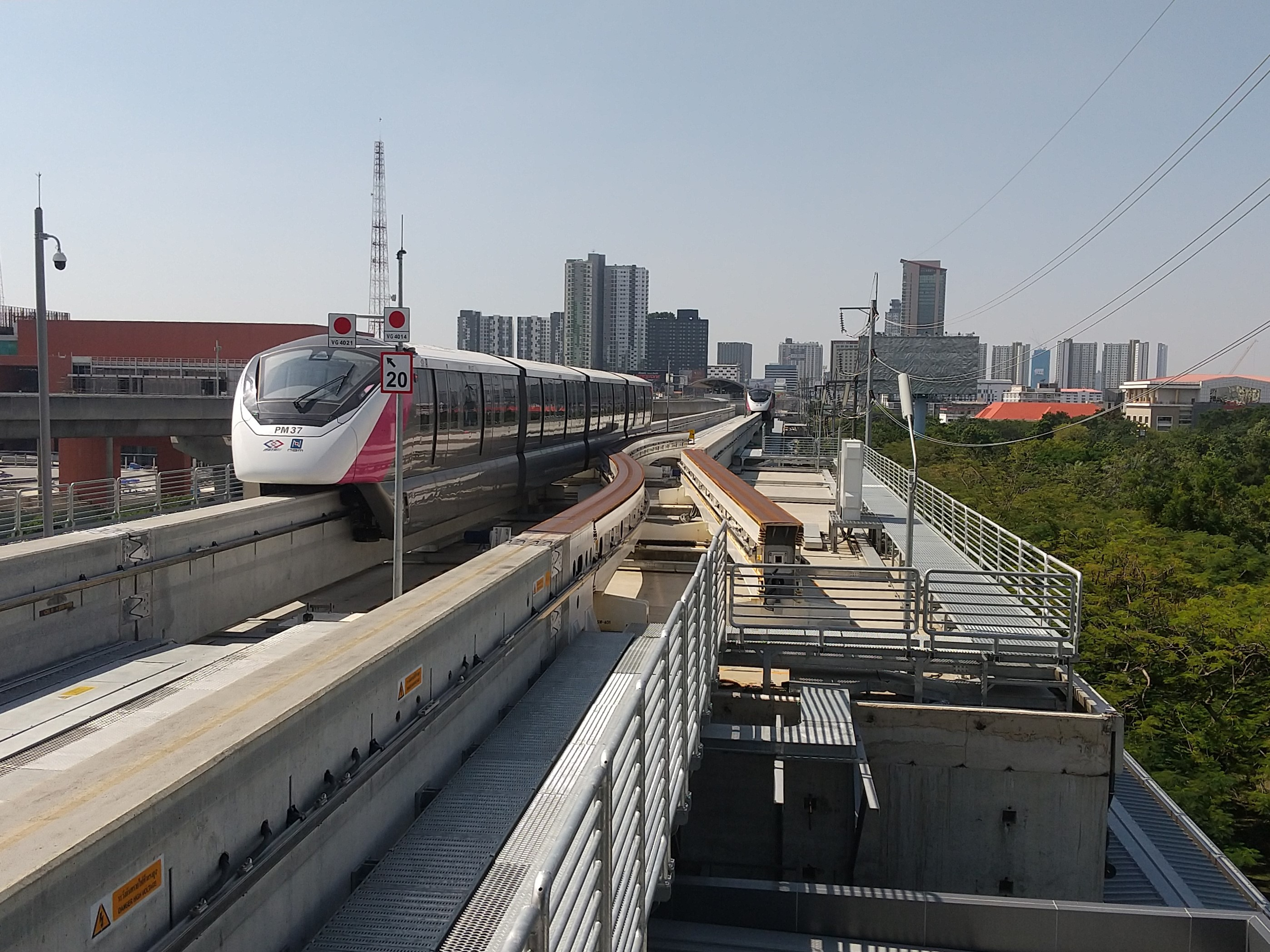
Elevated guidebeams at Nonthaburi Civic Center station

The Bombardier Innovia Monorail 300 operates on a narrow, elevated guide beam. Pre-cast, post-tensioned guide beams are constructed at an off-site location and later installed on the system. The guide beams are 690 mm (27 in) wide. The Innovia Monorail 300 was designed to navigate curves as tight as 46 m (151 ft) and a maximum grade of 6%. Monorail switches will be either beam replacement or multi-position pivot switches. The system will have evacuation walkways down the entire length of the guide beam. These walkways will allow passengers to escape onboard hazards. These walkways will be used by the maintenance crew for repairs and general maintenance to the system.

== Operation ==
=== Headways ===
MRT Pink Line headway
Time	Headway (Minutes:Seconds)
Monday - Friday
06.00 - 06.30	10:00
06:30 - 08:30	05:00
08:30 - 16:30	10:00
16:30 - 19:30	05:00
19:30 - 24:00	10:00
Saturday to Sunday and Public Holiday
06:00 - 24:00	10:00

Muang Thong Thani Line headway
Time	Headway (Minutes:Seconds)
Monday - Friday
07.00 - 09.00	06:00
09:00 - 17:00	10:00
17:00 - 19:00	05:00
19:00 - 24:00	10:00
Saturday to Sunday and Public Holiday
06:00 - 24:00	10:00

=== Ridership ===
From January 25 to January 31, 2025, Prime Minister Paetongtarn Shinawatra has implemented a policy of free public transportation in Bangkok for one week. This measure aims to address the worsening air pollution caused by surging dust levels across all districts of the capital.

MRT Pink Line Ridership
Year	Quarter	Quarterly Ridership	Daily Ridership	Annual Ridership	Remarks
2024	Q1	4,698,403	51,631	18,416,446	PK01 Nonthaburi Civic Centre - PK30 Min Buri section officially opened on 7 January 2024.
2024	Q2	4,671,647	51,337	18,416,446	
2024	Q3	5,459,624	59,344	18,416,446	
2024	Q4	5,295,415	57,559	18,416,446	
2025	Q1	5,496,706	61,075	22,520,891	Free public transportation policy was implemented between 25 and 31 January 2025. Train services were temporarily suspended due to 2025 Myanmar Earthquake on 28 March 2025.
2025	Q2	5,283,577	58,062	22,520,891	The line resumed normal service on 1 April, without Min Buri station, which resumed service on 16 April 2025. PK10 Muang Thong Thani - MT02 Lake Muang Thong Thani section officially opened on 20 June 2025.
2025	Q3	5,974,310	64,939	22,520,891	Shuttle service operated between PK01 Nonthaburi Civic Centre and PK05 Royal Irrigation Department from 13 September to 4 December 2025 due to equipment failure. As of December 2025.
2025	Q4	5,766,298	62,678	22,520,891	Shuttle service operated between PK01 Nonthaburi Civic Centre and PK05 Royal Irrigation Department from 13 September to 4 December 2025 due to equipment failure. As of December 2025.
2026	Q1	5,650,867	62,787	17,748,814	
2026	Q2	5,612,283	61,673	17,748,814	
2026	Q3	6,485,664	70,496	17,748,814	As of September 2026
2026	Q4			17,748,814	

== Incidents ==
=== Equipment failure ===
During the free trial period on 24 December 2023 at approximately 4:45 a.m., before daily passenger service had begun, an estimated 300m stretch of electrified conductor rail fell down to the road below near Samakkhi station, with an additional 4km of the conductor rail left hanging above the street. Three cars were damaged, and a train became stuck on the damaged section. No injuries were reported. All stations between Nonthaburi Civic Center and Pak Kret Bypass were closed, and a shuttle service was provided between Chaeng Watthana - Pak Kret 28 and National Telecom stations, while an investigation took place and the conductor rail was repaired.

At 6:00 p.m. on 30 December, the seven stations reopened, with trains running in a single direction between Nonthaburi Civic Center and Royal Irrigation Department stations on the unaffected rails as a shuttle service, and in both directions on the remaining stations.

=== Construction safety failure ===
On 30 March 2024 during construction of the Muang Thong Thani branch line, cement fell from the concourse of Impact Muang Thong Thani Station, breaking a car window and injuring a child riding in the back seat. The Minister of Transport ordered a 7-day halt to construction in the area.

=== 2025 Myanmar earthquake ===
During the 2025 Myanmar earthquake on 28 March, a section of its power line was dislocated in Min Buri district of Bangkok, forcing the line to suspend operations. The line was reopened on April 1, with only Min Buri station remaining closed. A shuttle bus provided by BMTA was deployed between Min Buri Market Station and Min Buri Station. Min Buri station resumed service on 16 April 2025.

== Route map ==

Route of the Pink Line

== Network map ==
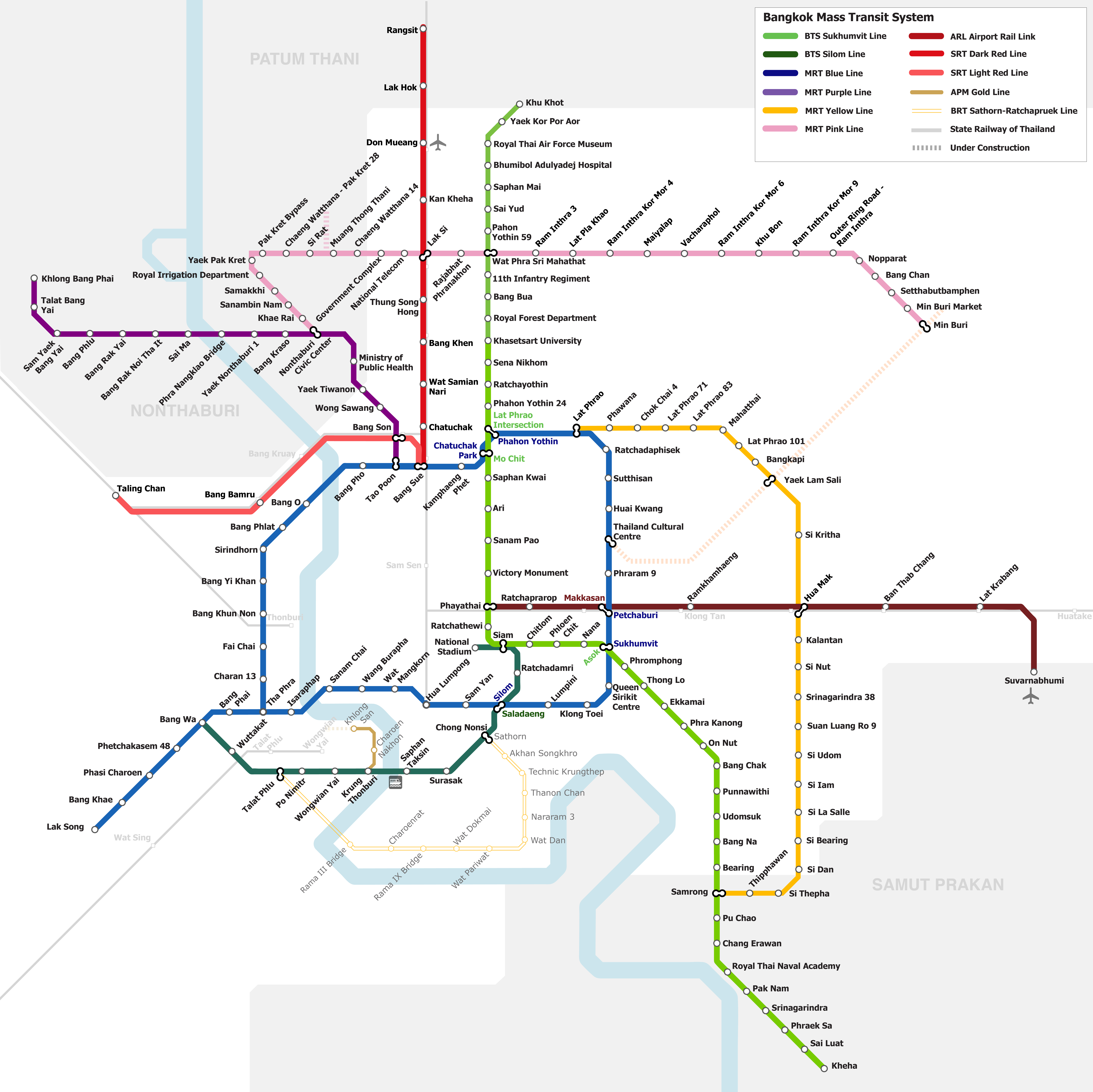

== See also ==
- Mass Rapid Transit Master Plan in Bangkok Metropolitan Region
- MRT (Bangkok)
- MRT Blue Line
- MRT Brown Line
- MRT Grey Line
- MRT Light Blue Line
- MRT Orange Line
- MRT Purple Line
- MRT Yellow Line
- BTS Skytrain
- BTS Sukhumvit Line
- BTS Silom Line
- Airport Rail Link (Bangkok)
- SRT Light Red Line
- SRT Dark Red Line
- Bangkok BRT
- BMA Gold Line
