= Mass Rapid Transit Authority of Thailand =

Government agency in Thailand

Mass Rapid Transit Authority of Thailand (MRTA)
- การรถไฟฟ้าขนส่งมวลชนแห่งประเทศไทย

Agency overview
- Formed: 21 August 1992; 33 years ago
- Type: State enterprise
- Jurisdiction: Thailand
- Headquarters: Bangkok, Thailand
- Parent department: Ministry of Transport
- Website: Official website

Mass Rapid Transit Authority of Thailand or MRTA (Thai: การรถไฟฟ้าขนส่งมวลชนแห่งประเทศไทย) is a state enterprise under the Ministry of Transport of Thailand. It is responsible for the operation of rapid transit systems in the Bangkok Metropolitan Region and including other provinces as defined by the royal decree. The MRTA was founded in 1992 and underwent restructuring in 2000. The MRTA currently oversees the operation of the MRT, which consists of the operational Blue Line, Purple Line, Yellow Line, and Pink Line. The MRTA also operate several Park and ride buildings along the route of the lines. Other rapid transit lines, including the Airport Rail Link, are owned and operated by other agencies.

== History ==
The Mass Rapid Transit Authority of Thailand was established in 1992 under the name Metropolitan Rapid Transit Authority, under the Royal Decree Establishment of the Metropolitan Rapid Transit Authority B.E. 2535, with the objective of organizing mass transportation systems in Bangkok and its vicinity by electric train.

On 1 December 2000, under the Mass Rapid Transit Authority of Thailand Act B.E. 2543, the name was changed to Mass Rapid Transit Authority of Thailand.

Under the act, the MRTA has the authority to designate "safe zones" to protect subway tunnels and underground structures and oversee the metro system as a whole. In addition, the MRTA is able to find income other than passenger fares and can develop real estate as necessary for the benefit of the electric train service and has the authority to operate the electric train business. The transit system may expand to other provinces as the royal decree authorizes.

== See also ==
- MRT (Bangkok)
- Mass Rapid Transit Master Plan in Bangkok Metropolitan Region
