= Lat Pla Khao MRT station =

Railway station in Bangkok, Thailand

Lat Pla Khao ลาดปลาเค้า
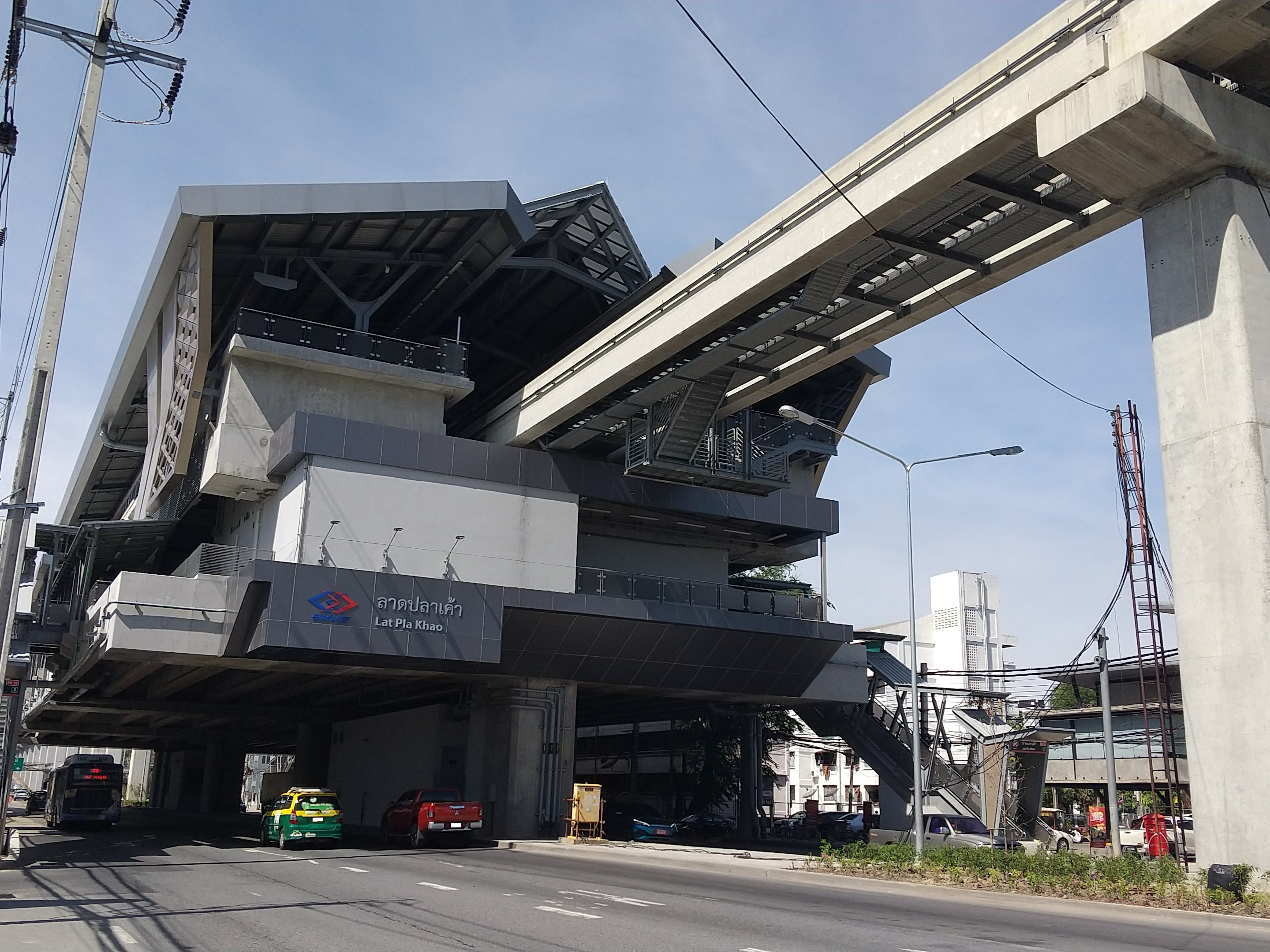

General information
- Location: Bang Khen District, Bangkok, Thailand
- System: MRT
- Owner: Mass Rapid Transit Authority of Thailand (MRTA)
- Operator: Northern Bangkok Monorail Company Limited
- Line: Pink Line

Other information
- Station code: PK18

History
- Opened: 21 November 2023

Services
Preceding station	Metropolitan Rapid Transit	Following station
Ram Inthra 3 towards Nonthaburi Civic Center	Pink Line	Ram Inthra Kor Mor 4 towards Min Buri
Location

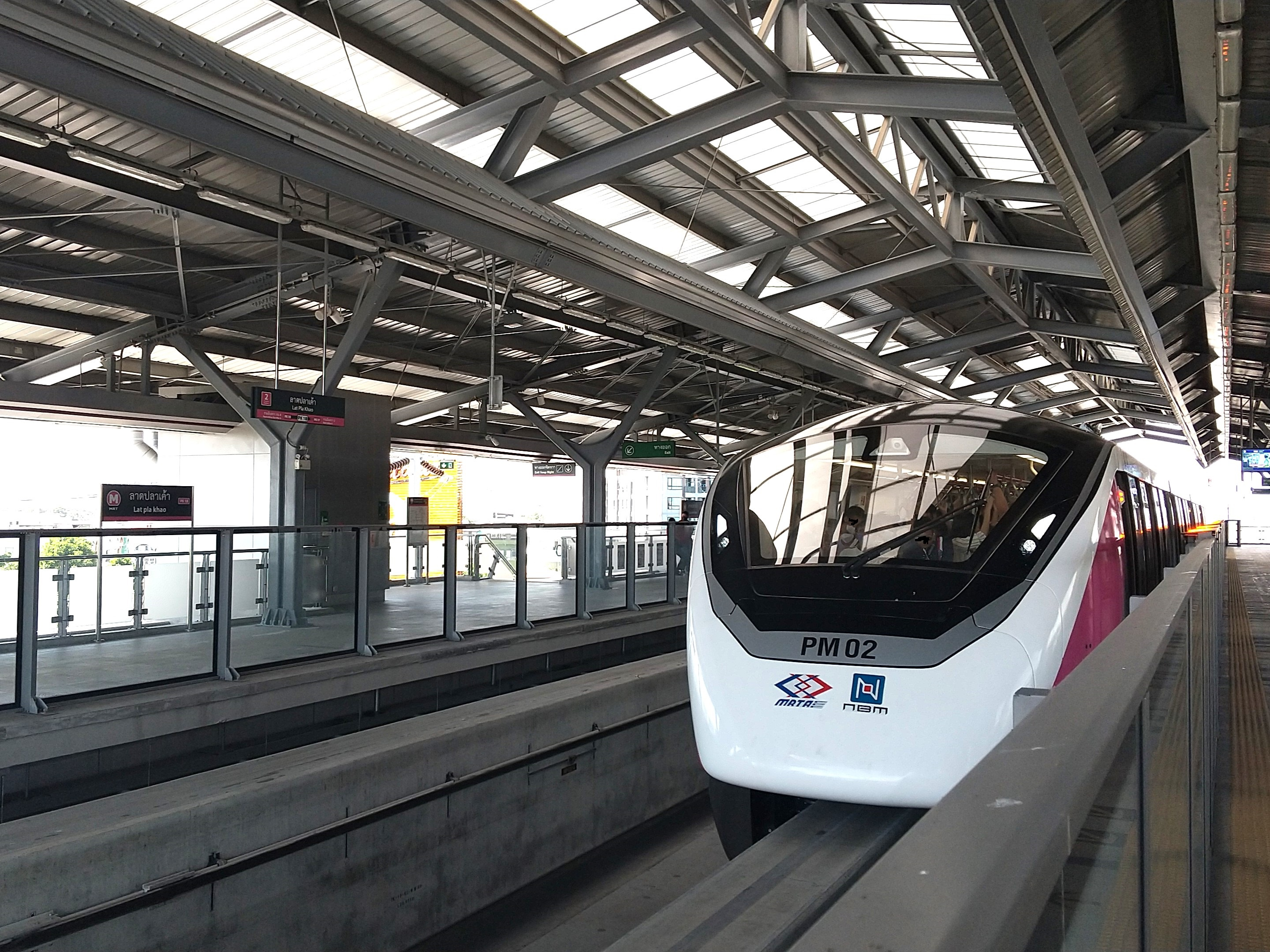
Platforms

Lat Pla Khao station (Thai: สถานีลาดปลาเค้า) is a Bangkok MRT station on the Pink Line. The station is located on Ram Inthra Road, near Soi Ram Inthra 4 in Bang Khen district, Bangkok. The station has four exits. It opened on 21 November 2023 as part of trial operations on the entire Pink Line.
