= Ram Inthra 3 MRT station =

Bangkok MRT station on Pink Line

Ram Inthra 3 รามอินทรา 3
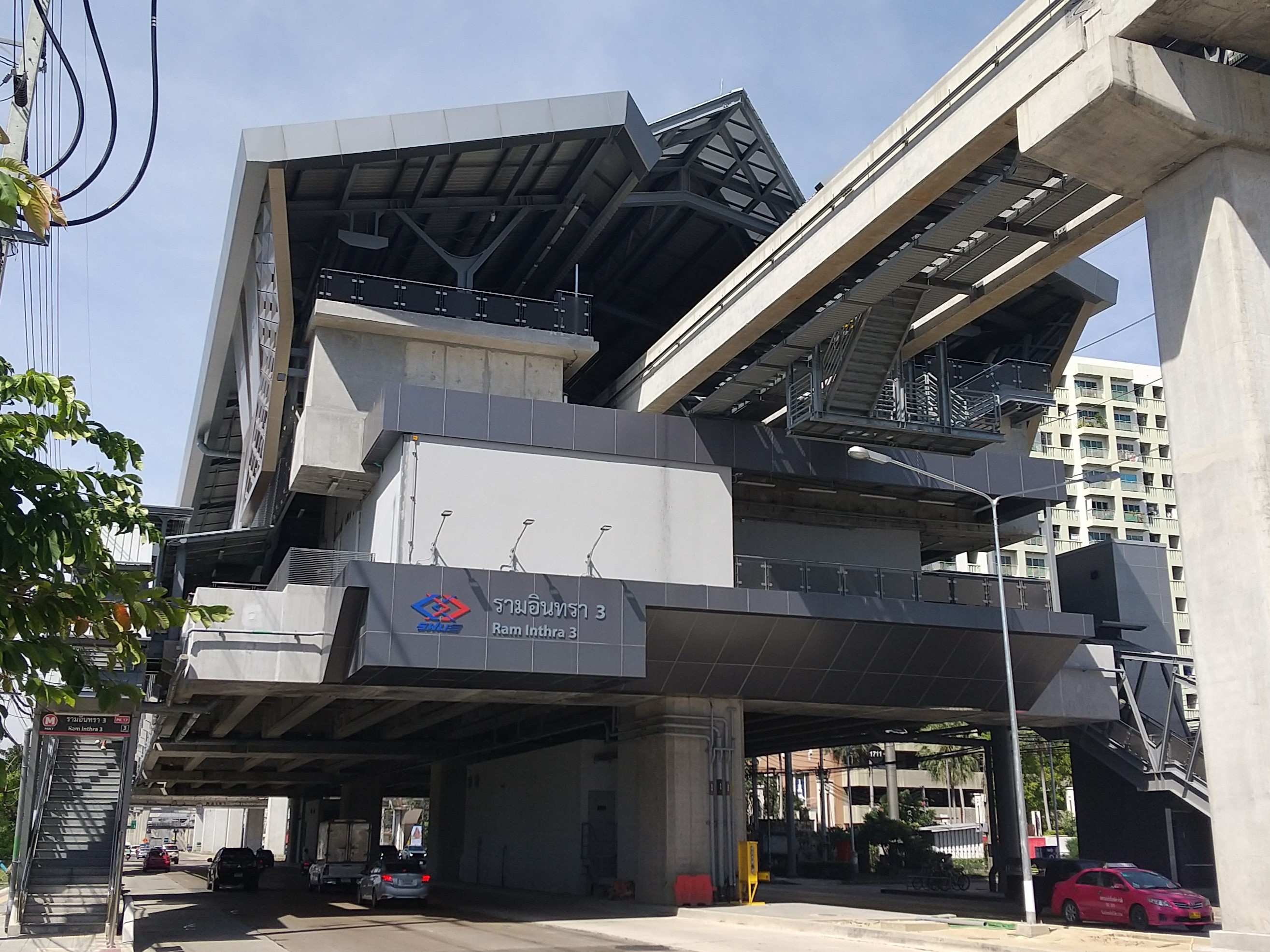

General information
- Location: Bang Khen District, Bangkok, Thailand
- System: MRT
- Owner: Mass Rapid Transit Authority of Thailand (MRTA)
- Operator: Northern Bangkok Monorail Company Limited
- Line: Pink Line

Other information
- Station code: PK17

History
- Opened: 21 November 2023

Services
Preceding station	Metropolitan Rapid Transit	Following station
Wat Phra Sri Mahathat towards Nonthaburi Civic Center	Pink Line	Lat Pla Khao towards Min Buri
Location

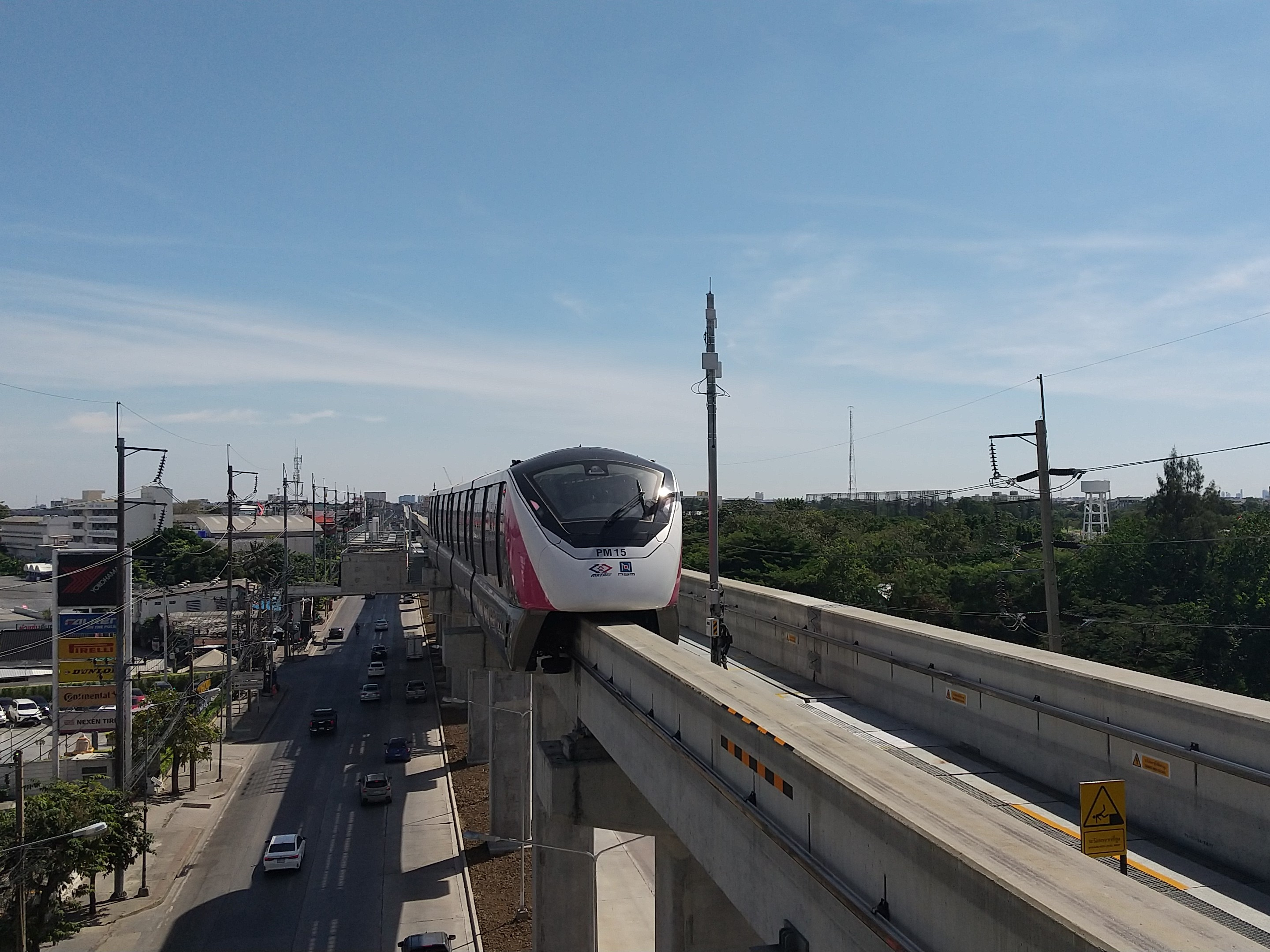
Train approaching Ram Inthra 3

Ram Inthra 3 station (Thai: สถานีรามอินทรา 3) is a Bangkok MRT station on the Pink Line. The station is located on Ram Inthra Road, near Ram Inthra Soi 3 in Bang Khen district, Bangkok. The station has four exits. It opened on 21 November 2023 as part of trial operations on the entire Pink Line.
