= Rajabhat Phranakhon MRT station =

Metro station in Bangkok, Thailand

Rajabhat Phranakhon ราชภัฏพระนคร
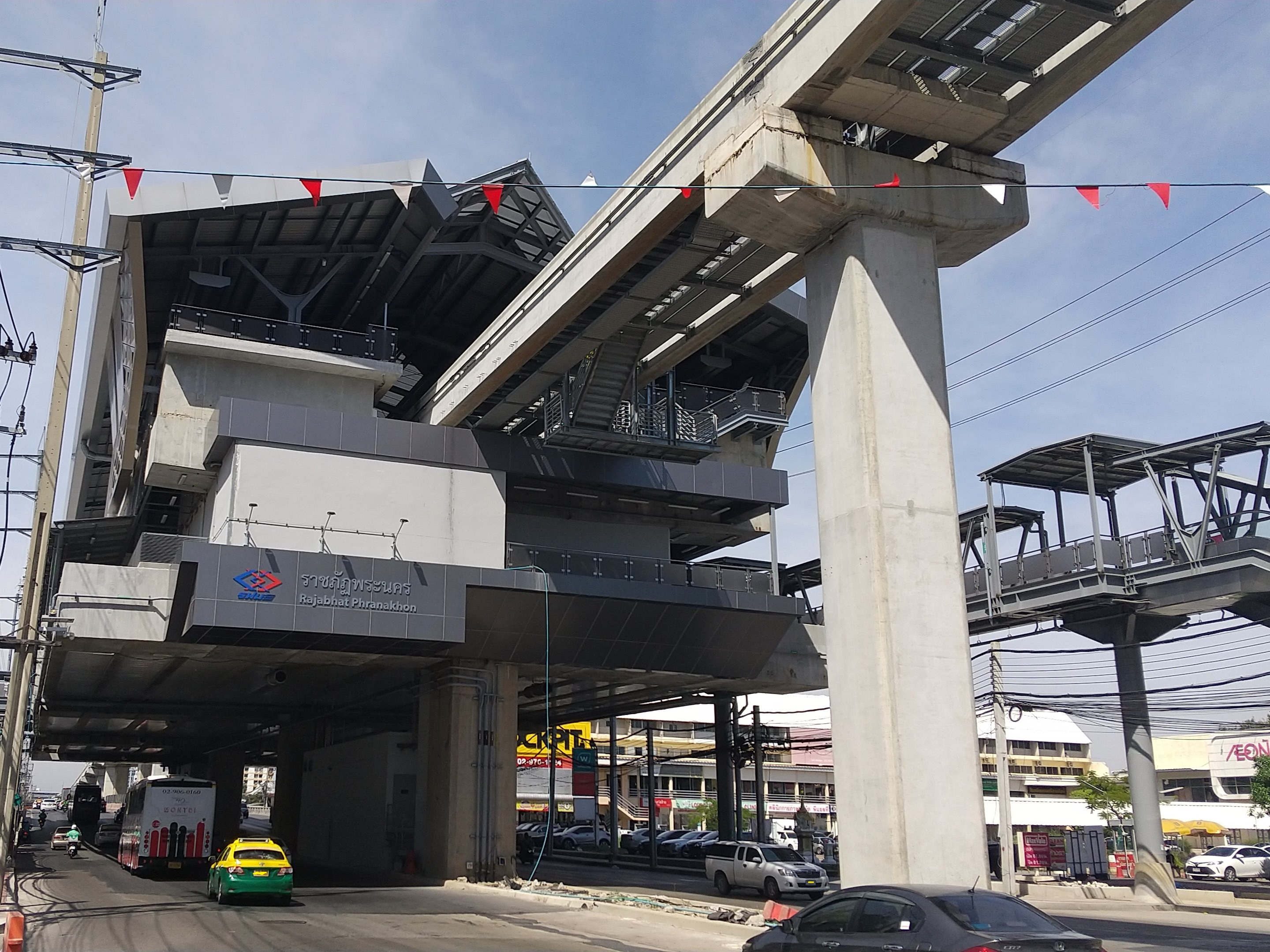

General information
- Location: Lak Si District, Bangkok, Thailand
- System: MRT
- Owner: Mass Rapid Transit Authority of Thailand (MRTA)
- Operator: Northern Bangkok Monorail Company Limited
- Line: Pink Line

Other information
- Station code: PK15

History
- Opened: 21 November 2023

Services
Preceding station	Metropolitan Rapid Transit	Following station
Lak Si towards Nonthaburi Civic Center	Pink Line	Wat Phra Sri Mahathat towards Min Buri
Location

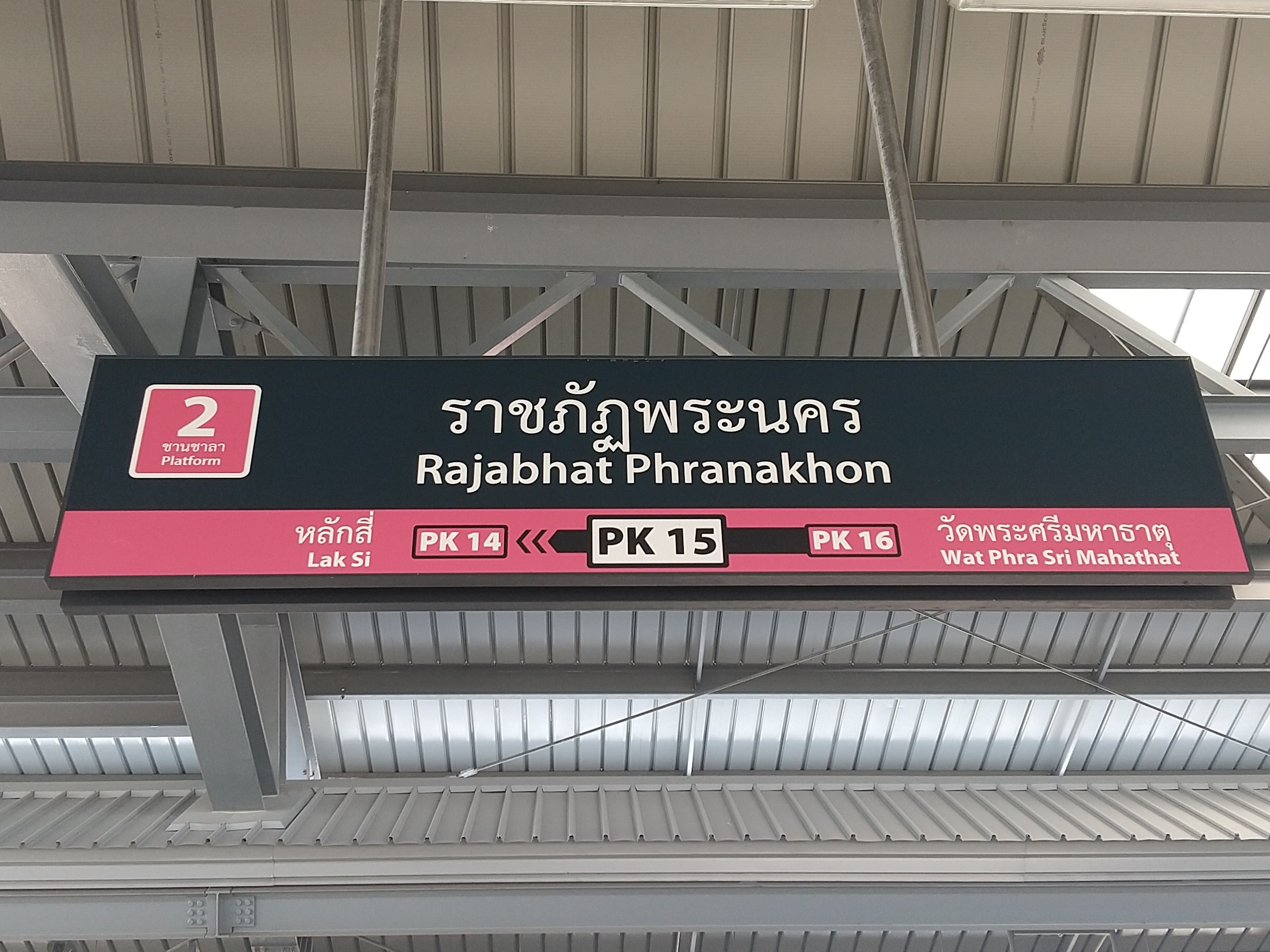
Signage

Rajabhat Phranakhon station (Thai: สถานีราชภัฏพระนคร) is a Bangkok MRT station on the Pink Line. The station is located on Chaeng Watthana Road, near Phranakhon Rajabhat University in Lak Si district, Bangkok. The station has four exits. It opened on 21 November 2023 as part of trial operations on the entire Pink Line.
