= Constitution Defense Monument =

Monument in Bangkok, Thailand (1936–2018)

- อนุสาวรีย์พิทักษ์รัฐธรรมนูญ
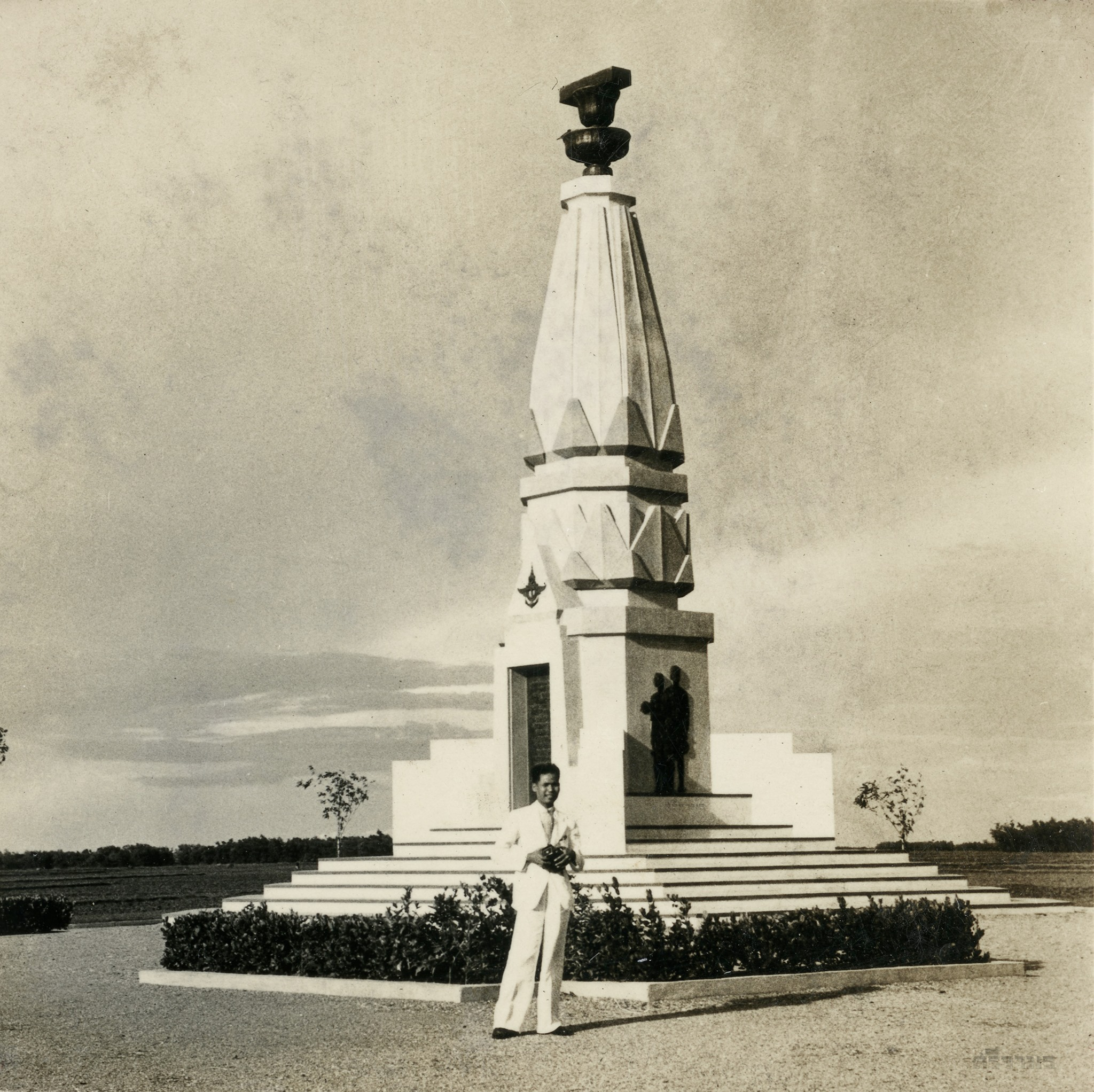
- The monument in 1938/1939
- Interactive map of Constitution Defense Monument
- Location: Anusawari subdistrict, Bang Khen district, Bangkok, Thailand
- Coordinates: 13.876°N 100.597°E
- Height: 14 m (46 ft)
- Opening date: 15 October 1936
- Dismantled date: 27–28 December 2018

The Constitution Defense Monument, (Note: Thai: อนุสาวรีย์พิทักษ์รัฐธรรมนูญ, RTGS: Anusawari Phithak Ratthathammanun, also translated as Safeguarding the Constitution Monument) built as the Rebellion Suppression Monument (Note: อนุสาวรีย์ปราบกบฏ, Anusawari Prap Kabot) and later also known as the Lak Si Monument, (Note: อนุสาวรีย์หลักสี่; alternatively Bang Khen Monument อนุสาวรีย์บางเขน) was a public monument in Bangkok, Thailand. It was erected in 1936 to commemorate the government's victory over the 1933 Boworadet Rebellion, and stood until its unexplained removal in 2018.

The monument was built by the People's Party government, which came to power with the abolition of absolute monarchy in 1932. After they defeated the rebellion—a royalist coup attempt led by Prince Boworadet—the government built a highway, now Phahonyothin Road, to strengthen its control of Bangkok's northern fringe, where much of the fighting took place. A monument was built there, in a plaza next to the road, to mark the event and honor the men who died fighting for the government.

Over the following decade, the monument was used as a patriotic symbol for the new constitutional state under Prime Minister Plaek Phibunsongkhram, but this narrative was challenged after a 1947 coup d'état brought a resurgence of the royalist faction. The monument subsequently lost most of its political significance, until pro-democracy protest movements revived it as a focal point during the 2010s. In December 2018, the monument was secretly removed overnight without explanation, an act believed to be part of an ongoing effort to erase the architectural legacy of the People's Party government.

The site of the monument is now a traffic circle in Bang Khen district, known as Lak Si or Bang Khen Circle/Roundabout. (Note: วงเวียนหลักสี่, Wongwian Lak Si; วงเวียนบางเขน, Wongwian Bang Khen) It forms the meeting point of Chaeng Watthana and Ram Inthra roads with Phahonyothin; its central island is now occupied by the elevated Wat Phra Sri Mahathat station, an interchange station of the Sukhumvit BTS and Pink MRT lines.

== History ==
=== Construction and significance ===
In October 1933, following the abolition of absolute monarchy in Thailand the year before, a royalist faction led by Prince Boworadet staged an attempted coup against the Khana Ratsadon (People's Party) government. Fighting ensued between the group and government forces in several locations, including the Bang Khen fields in Bangkok's northern fringe, in the vicinity of Don Mueang Airfield. Heavy fighting broke out, in which the government successfully pushed back and eventually defeated the rebels. Seventeen military and police personnel who had died fighting for the government were hailed as national heroes and given state funerals in Sanam Luang—a treatment usually reserved for royalty.

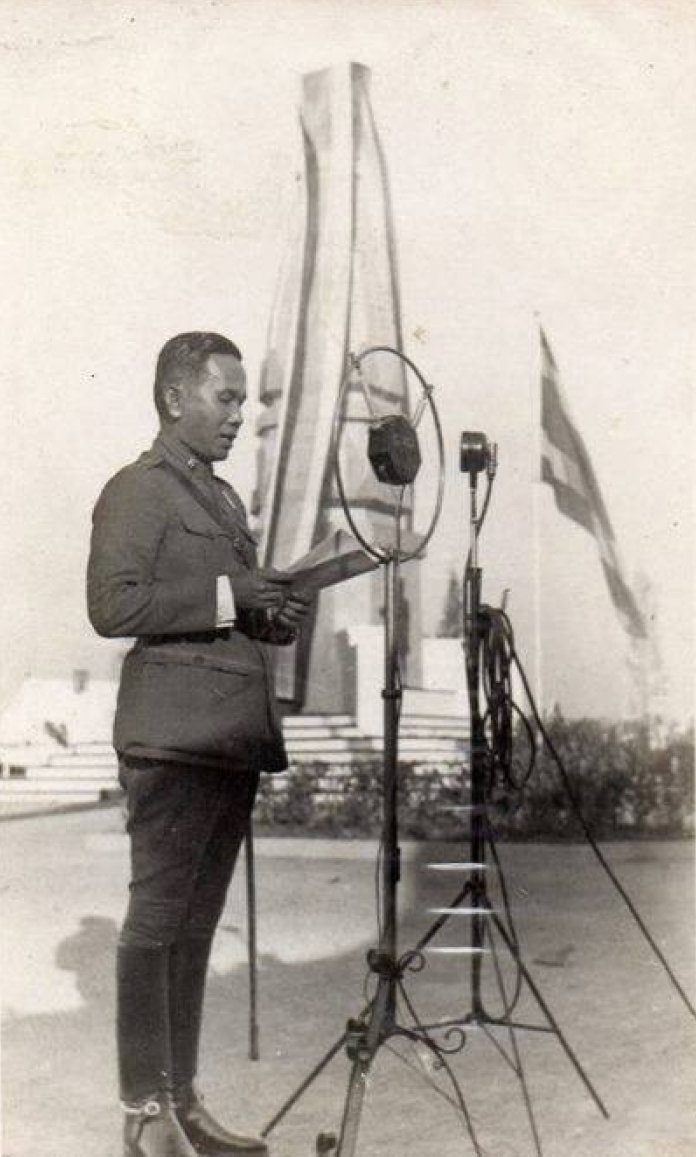
Phibun delivering the opening report at the monument's unveiling in 1936

To strengthen the government's control over Don Mueang Airfield, Prime Minister Phraya Phahonphonphayuhasena proposed in early 1934 that a highway be built to link it to central Bangkok. A monument to honor the seventeen men was also proposed, together with the highway. The proposal was unanimously approved by parliament, and the road, which would later become known as Phahonyothin Road, was built from March to July 1934. The monument, situated in a plaza next to the road, was completed in 1936.

The monument was opened with much fanfare on 15 October 1936, the third anniversary of the battle. The ashes of the 17 men were brought in a military parade from their previous resting places at their affiliated units, and reinterred in the monument in a Buddhist ceremony. The monument was then opened by Prince Aditya Dibabha, the regent, with Luang Phibunsongkhram (Phibun), the Minister of Defense, delivering the opening report.

Over the following years, the monument was the site of annual remembrance ceremonies, which grew into large public affairs following Phibun's rise to the premiership in 1938. Under fascist-leaning Phibun, the monument was leveraged as a patriotic symbol for the new state under the constitutional system. The plaza around the monument was expanded in 1940, and a new "Democracy Temple", another tribute to the constitutional system (now Wat Phra Si Mahathat), was also built near the monument.

Following the Second World War, Phibun was ousted from government in 1944, and a newly ascendant royalist faction began challenging the patriotic narratives previously laid by his government. This was especially the case following the 1947 coup d'état which brought the royalists to power, and although Phibun was allied with them and regained the premiership in 1948, the significance of the monument as a national symbol was mostly put to an end. By the 1960s, the monument plaza was transformed into a local public space, with manicured gardens, fountains, and a clock tower.

=== Later developments ===
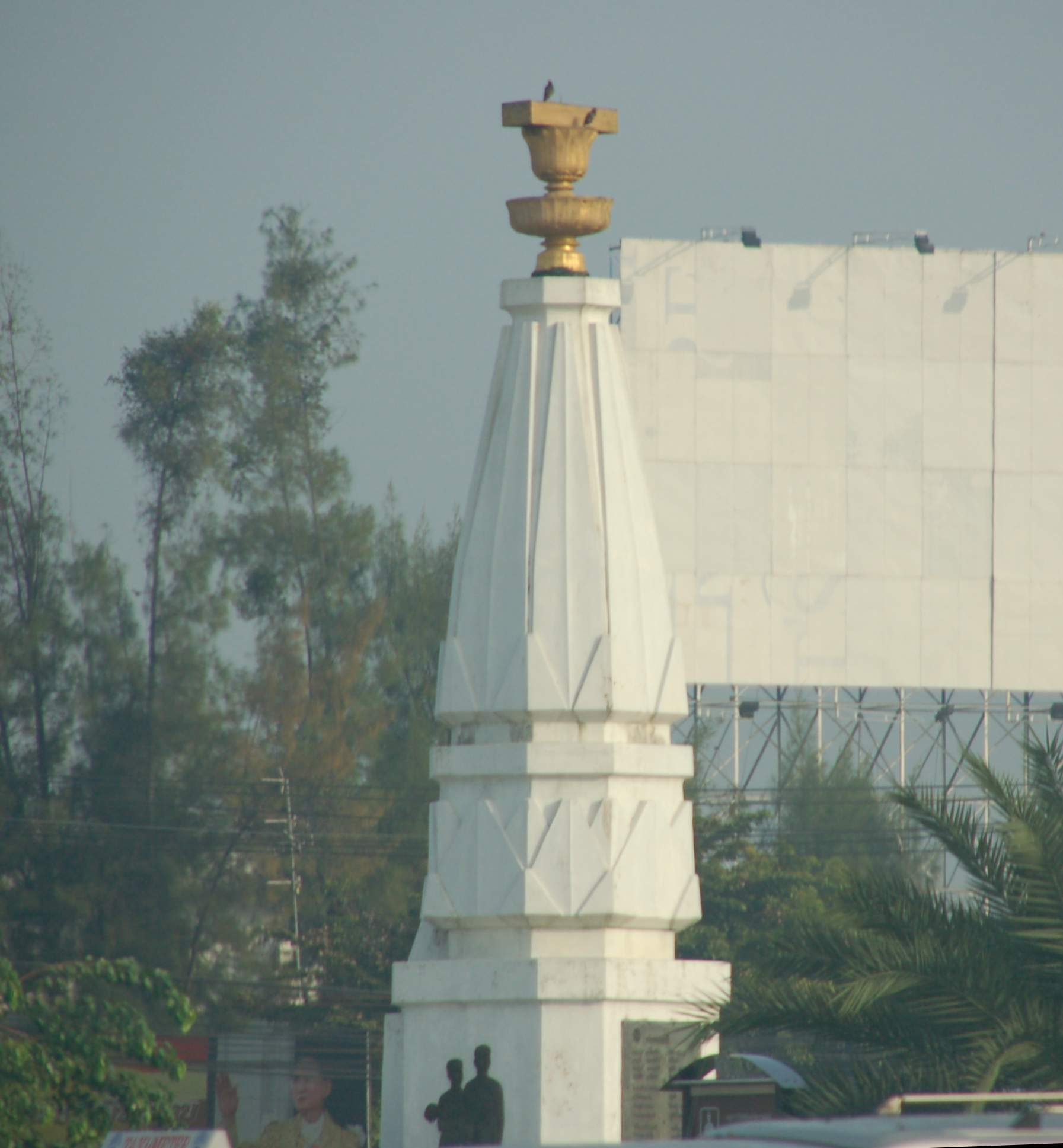
The monument in 2008

As the city grew and traffic increased, the plaza was transformed into a traffic circle in 1987, cutting the monument off from public access. This was changed back into an intersection in 1993, and again into a rotary with an underpass in 1998. The monument was slightly moved to make way for an overpass in 2010, and again in 2016 for the northern extension of the BTS Skytrain's Sukhumvit Line.

Although the monument had lost its political significance for over half a century, it received renewed interest in the 2010s as pro-democracy groups that emerged after the 2006 coup sought a revival of People's Party–era iconography. On 12 March 2010, the United Front for Democracy Against Dictatorship staged a rally at the monument, and associated Red Shirt groups continued to use the site for protests over the following years. This was put to an end by the 2014 coup, as the military junta that took power, led by Prayut Chan-o-cha, would suppress all forms of political activity for several years.

While the relocation of the monument for the Skytrain in 2016 drew some protests, it was approved by the Fine Arts Department, which had included the monument in its list of ancient monuments in Bangkok since 2015. Two years later, however, the monument was secretly removed in the night of 27–28 December 2018. No official explanation was ever given, and the relevant agencies denied knowledge of what happened to the monument. Activists who attempted to witness and film the removal were detained. It is unknown whether the monument was relocated or demolished.

The monument's removal came one year after the similarly unexplained removal of a commemorative People's Party plaque in Bangkok's Royal Plaza, which commemorated the 1932 abolition of absolute monarchy. Observers noted it to be part of a systemic removal of monuments and statues associated with the People's Party and the 1932 revolution, amounting to an attempted erasure from public memory of the party's legacy by the military-royalists in power. While the Fine Arts Department filed a police report against the monument's unauthorized removal in 2020, as of 2025 no one has been held responsible for the act.

== Design ==
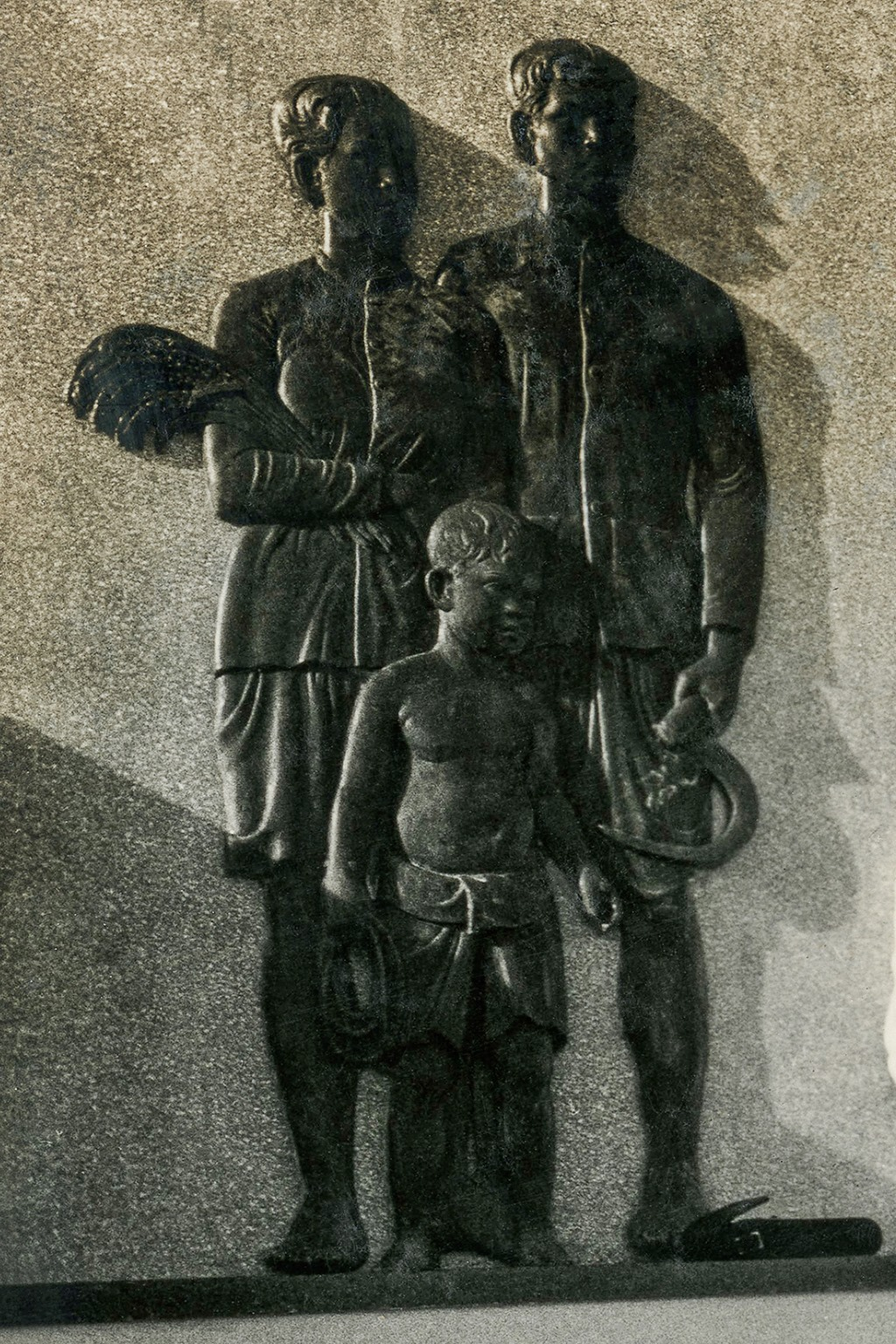
Farmer's family bas-relief, 1938/1939

The monument was designed by Lieutenant Colonel Luang Naruemitrekhakan (Yuean Punyasen), an army artist. It is a 14-metre-tall (46 ft) concrete structure in the shape of a tapered pillar on an octagonal base, topped with a representation of the constitution on a pedestal (phan). Facing west, the front of the monument features an inscription bearing the names of the 17 men who died fighting for the government. The south side features a metal bas-relief depicting a farmer's family. The north face bears a Dharmachakra, and the east side features an inscription of Sayamanusati, the patriotic poem written by King Vajiravudh.

The constitution-on-pedestal motif is featured in several post-absolute-monarchy monuments, including the later-built Democracy Monument.

== Location ==
The monument was built in what was then empty fields in Bangkok's Bang Khen district. A road (now part of Chaeng Watthana Road) led from Lak Si railway station 1.9 km away, where a large part of the fighting took place, to meet the new highway perpendicularly at the monument plaza. The area, originally part of Tambon Lak Si, was reorganized into a new subdistrict in 1943 and named after the monument as Tambon Anusawari Bang Khen (anusawari meaning 'monument'). It is now Khwaeng Anusawari in Khet Bang Khen.

Today, Lak Si Circle, where the monument was located, is a large traffic circle linking Phahonyothin Road, which runs southwest–northeast, with Chaeng Watthana Road to the northwest and Ram Inthra Road to the southeast. An underpass bypasses the rotary along the Phahonyothin direction, while an overpass links Chaeng Watthana and Ram Inthra. The section of Wat Phra Sri Mahathat station serving the BTS's Sukhumvit Line occupies the circle's large central island, while the section serving the Pink Line monorail extends southeastward over Ram Inthra Road, flanking the overpass.

Phranakhon Rajabhat University occupies the west corner of the intersection, with Wat Phra Si Mahathat just beyond it along Phahonyothin Road. In the south corner lies the large compound of the 11th Infantry Regiment. The Bang Khen Metropolitan Police Station occupies the east corner, as it has done since 1940 as one of the first government offices built around the intersection when the area was mostly empty fields.

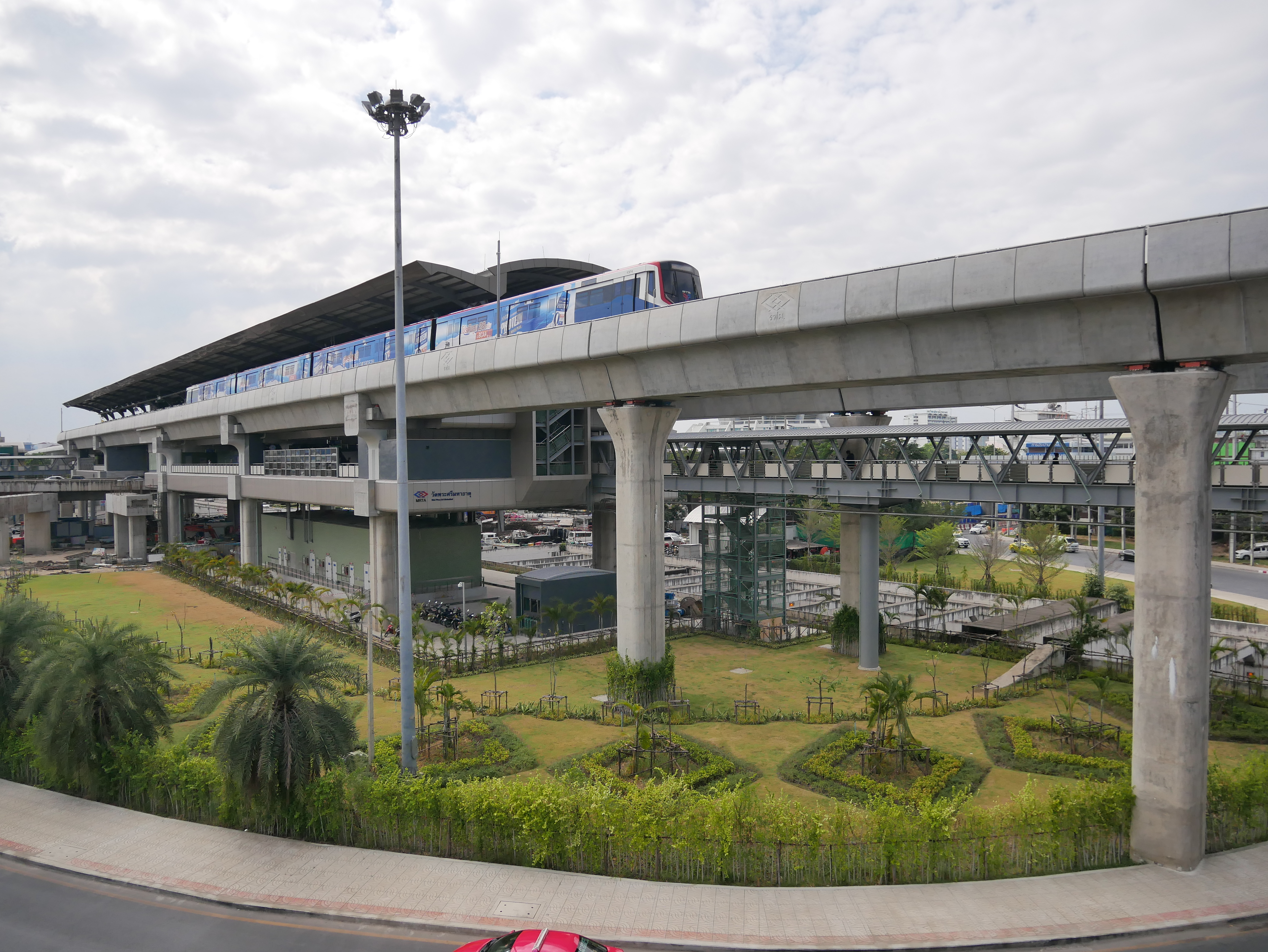
Wat Phra Sri Mahathat station (pictured in 2020, before the Pink Line station was built) now occupies the traffic circle's central island. The monument's last location, before its 2018 disappearance, is the lawn beyond the elevated rail tracks and the underpass.

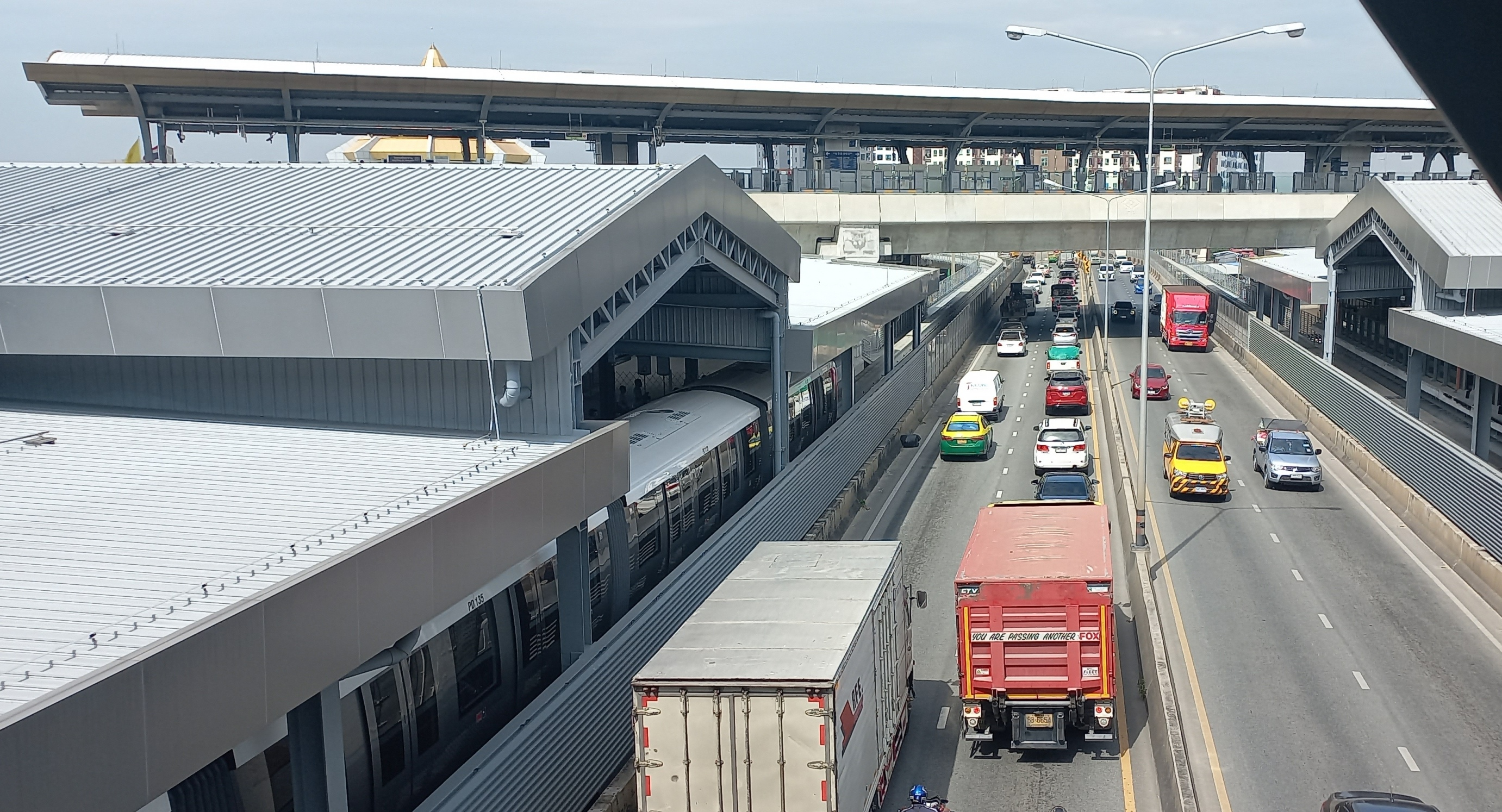
The Pink Line platforms of Wat Phra Sri Mahathat station are parallel to the road bridge, underneath Sukhumvit Line platforms.
