= Lak Si station =

Railway station in Bangkok, Thailand

Lak Si หลักสี่
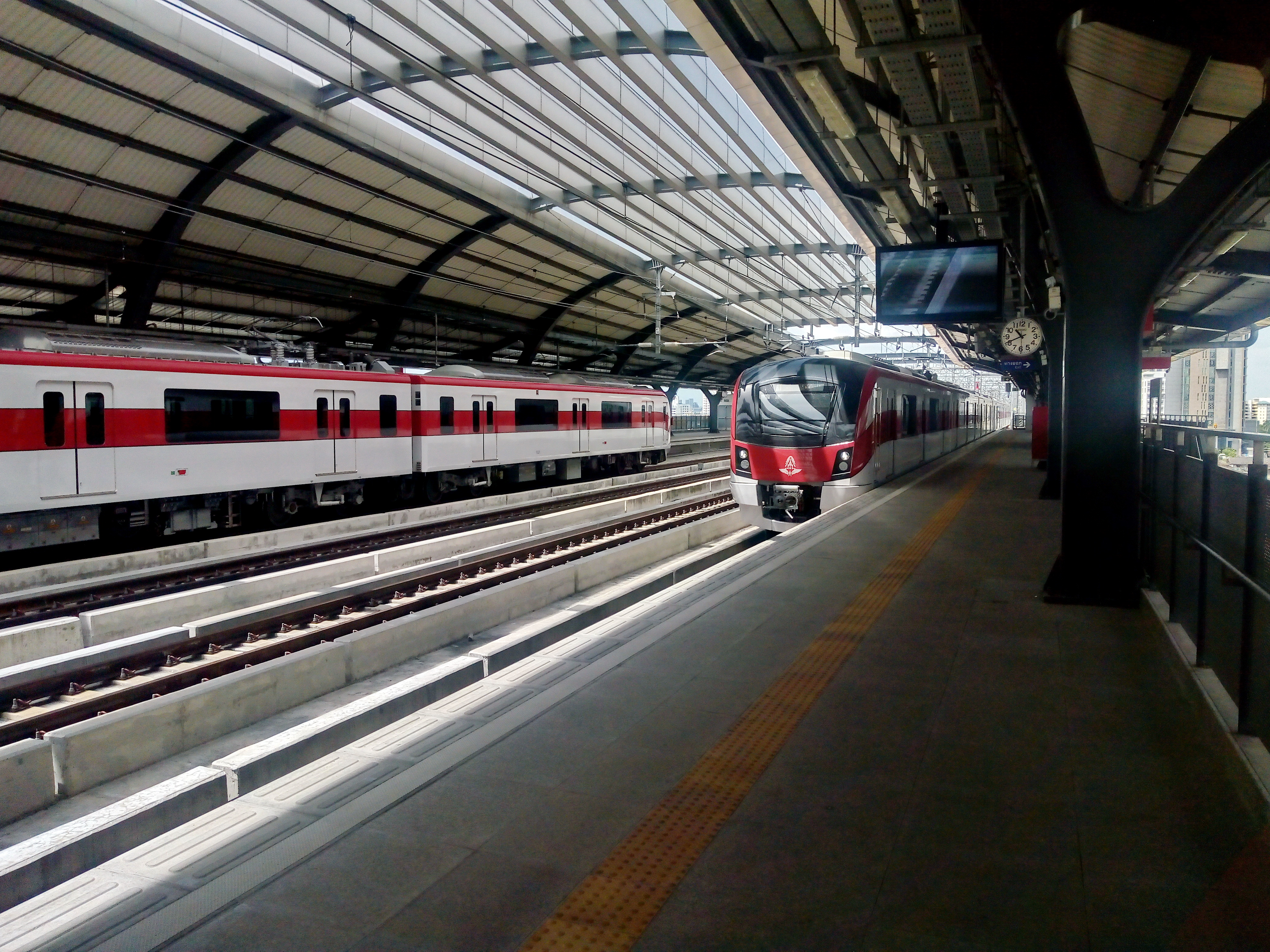
- Dark Red Line platforms

General information
- Location: Kamphaeng Phet 6 Rd, Talat Bang Khen Subdistrict, Lak Si; Bangkok; Thailand
- Coordinates: 13.884348°N 100.580793°E
- Operator: State Railway of Thailand (SRT); Northern Bangkok Monorail Company Limited (MRT)
- Manager: Ministry of Transport (SRT); Mass Rapid Transit Authority of Thailand (MRT)
- Platforms: 2 (SRT); 2 (MRT)
- Tracks: 4 (SRT); 2 (MRT)

Construction
- Structure type: Elevated
- Parking: Yes
- Cycle facilities: Yes

Other information
- Station code: RN06 (SRT); PK14 (MRT)

History
- Opened: 1898; 128 years ago (original); 2 August 2021; 5 years ago (Dark Red Line); 21 November 2023; 2 years ago (Pink Line)
- Closed: 19 January 2023; 3 years ago (original)
- Electrified: 25 kV 50 Hz AC overhead catenary

Services
Preceding station	SRT Red Lines	Following station
Thung Song Hong towards Krung Thep Aphiwat	Dark Red Line	Kan Kheha towards Rangsit
Preceding station	Metropolitan Rapid Transit	Following station
National Telecom towards Nonthaburi Civic Center	Pink Line	Rajabhat Phranakhon towards Min Buri
Location

Lak Si Station (Thai: สถานีหลักสี่) is an interchange station on SRT Dark Red Line and MRT Pink Line in Lak Si, Bangkok. It is located on the intersection where Vibhavadi Rangsit and Chaeng Watthana roads meet.

== History ==
Lak Si station opened in 1898 as part of Thailand's first railway between Bangkok and Ayutthaya. The original station structure was demolished in 1990 during the construction of the failed Bangkok Elevated Road and Train System (also known as the Hopewell project).

The new elevated station opened on 2 August 2021. The ground-level station closed on 19 January 2023 and long-distance trains on the Northern and Northeastern lines stopped operating from the ground-level station entirely.

On 21 November 2023, the MRT Pink Line station opened, turning the station into an interchange.

== Gallery ==
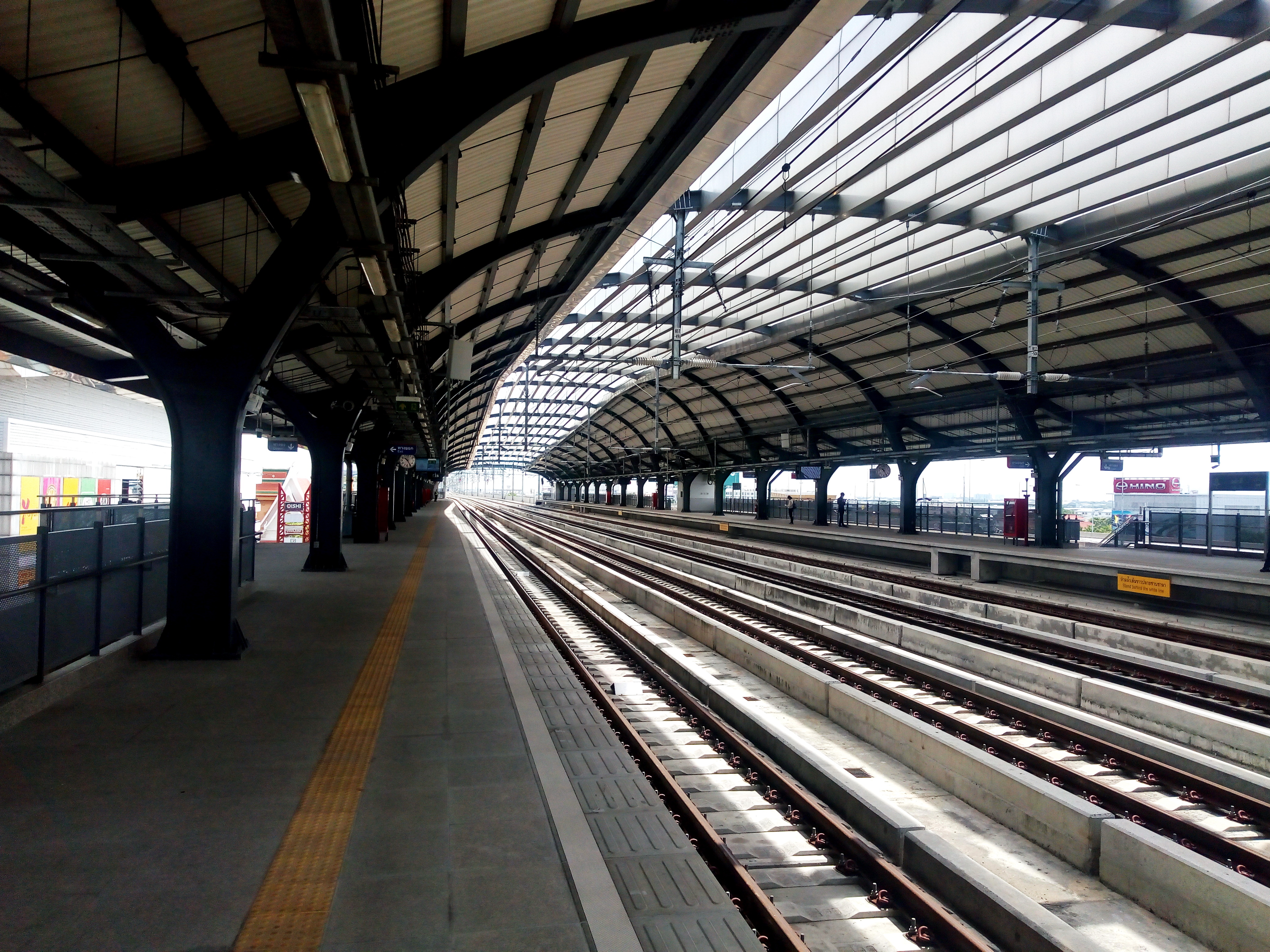
Elevated SRT Dark Red Line platforms

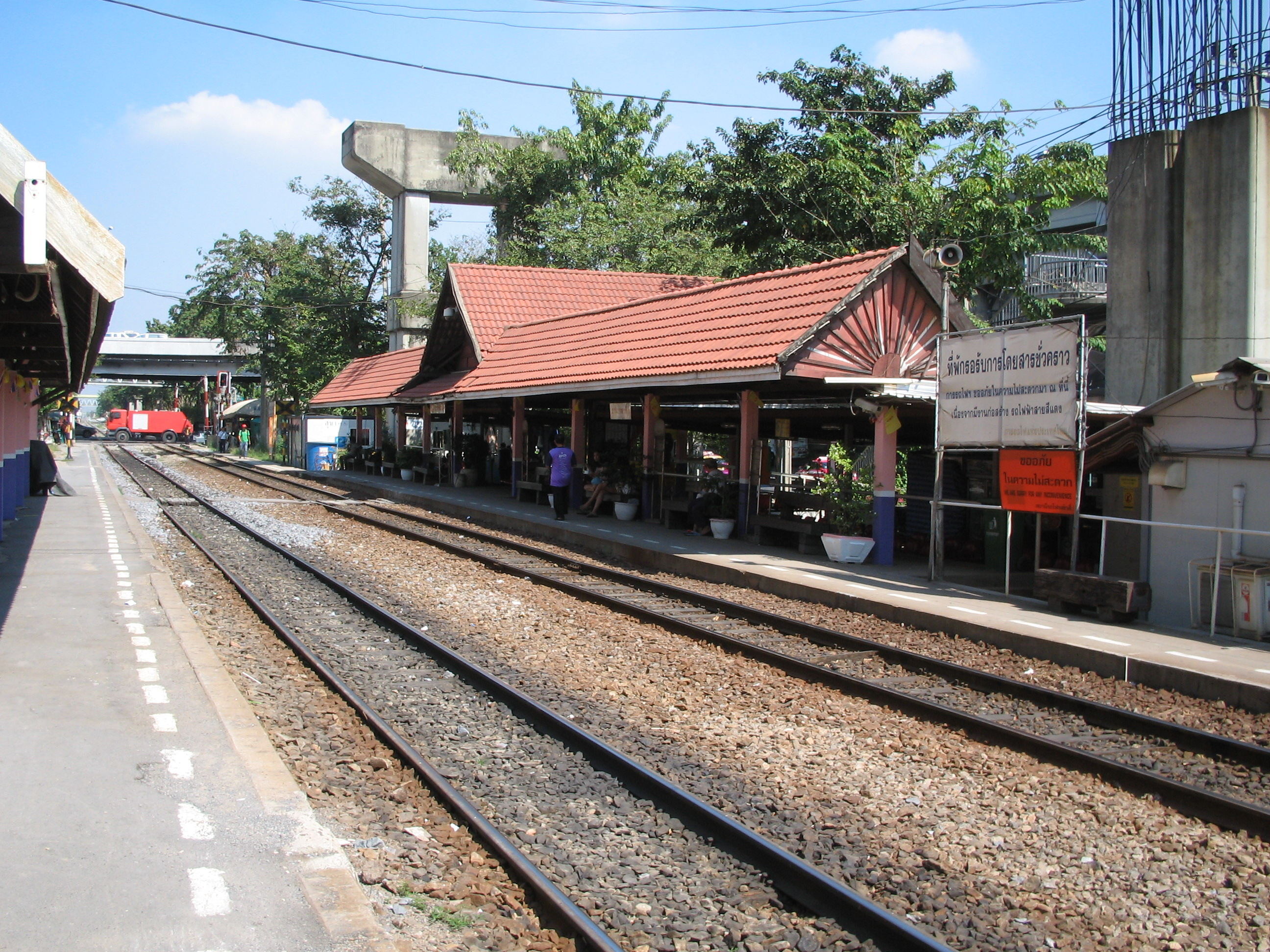
Former ground-level platforms

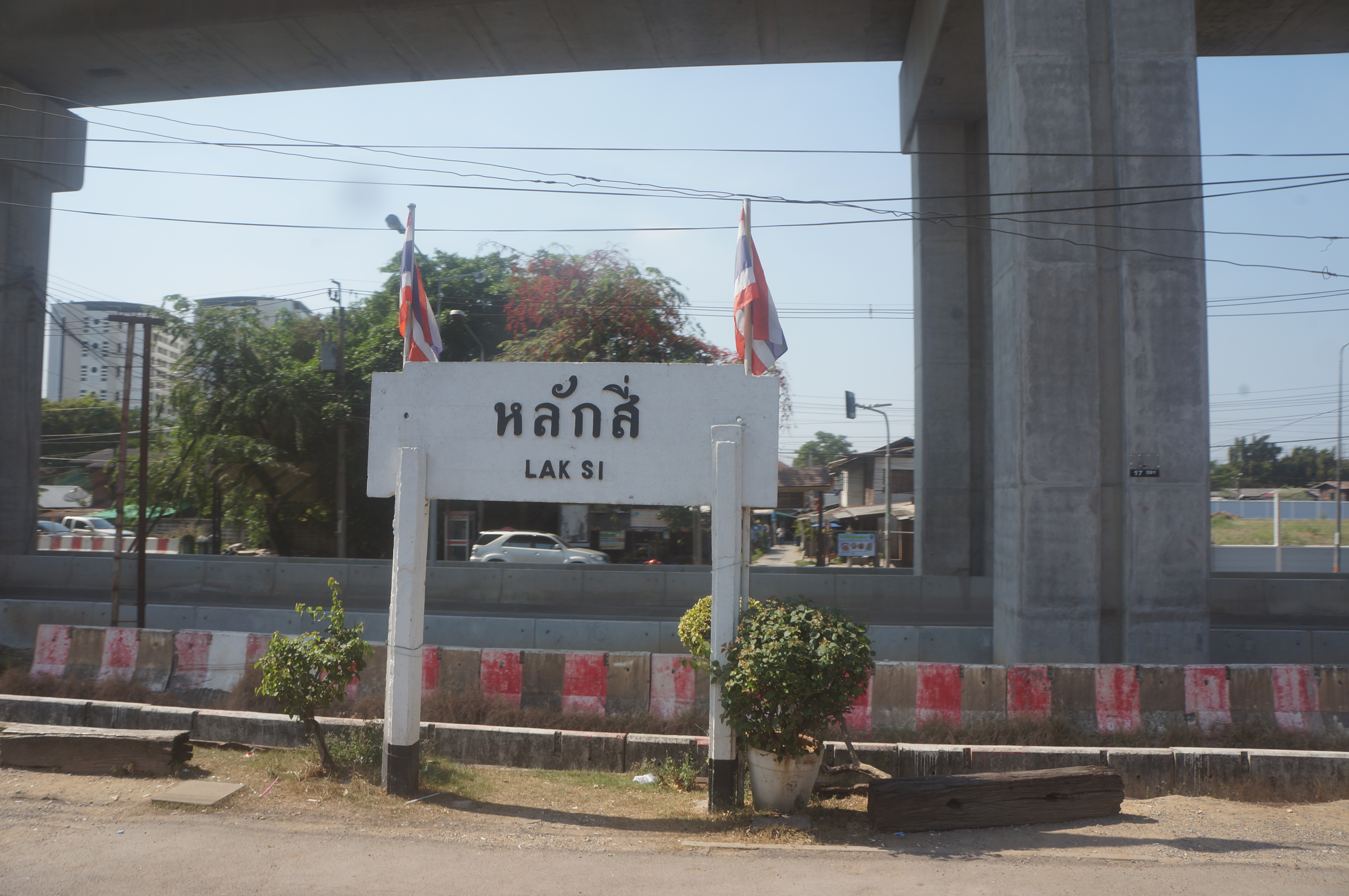
Former ground-level station signage

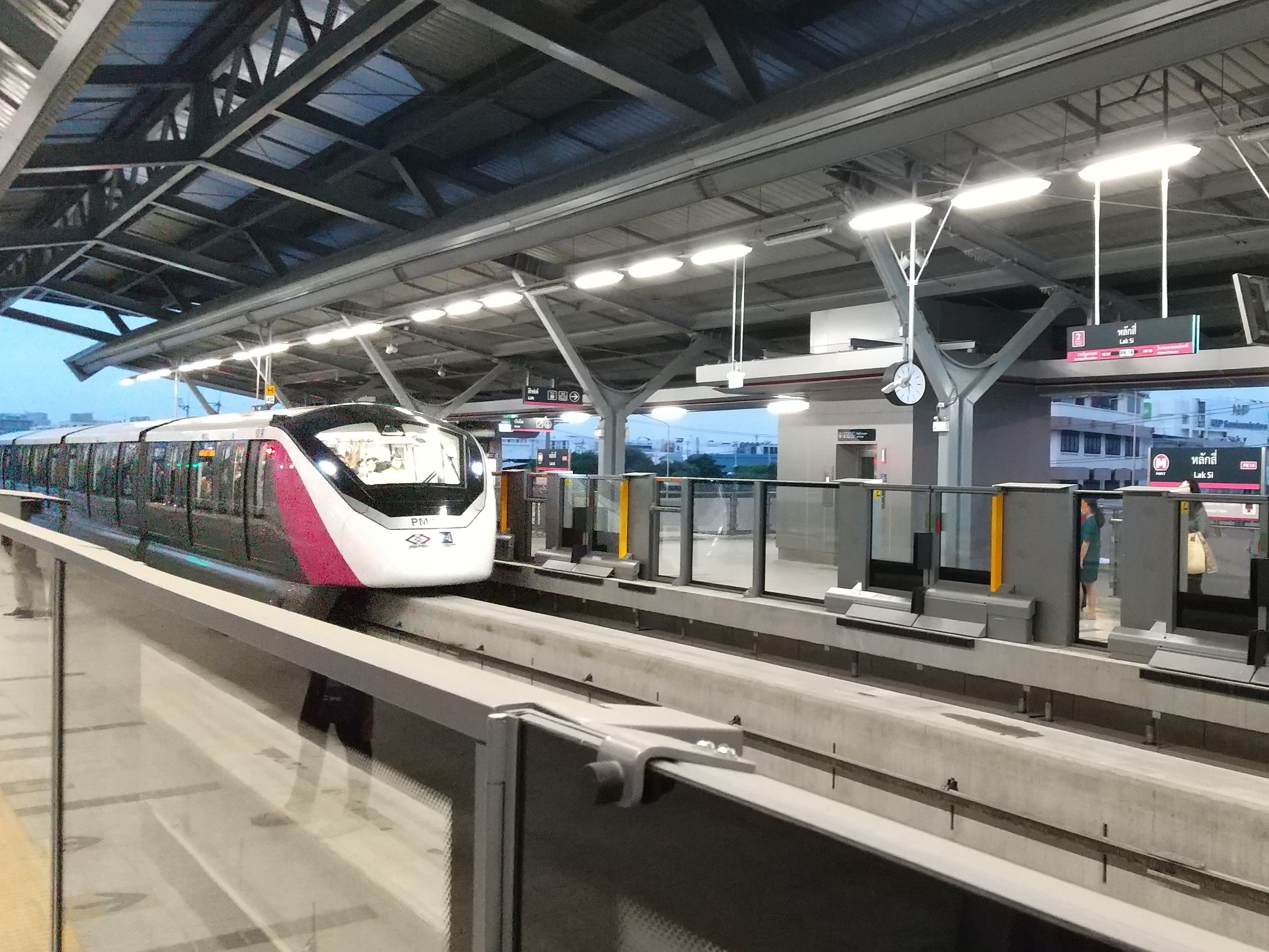
MRT Pink Line platforms

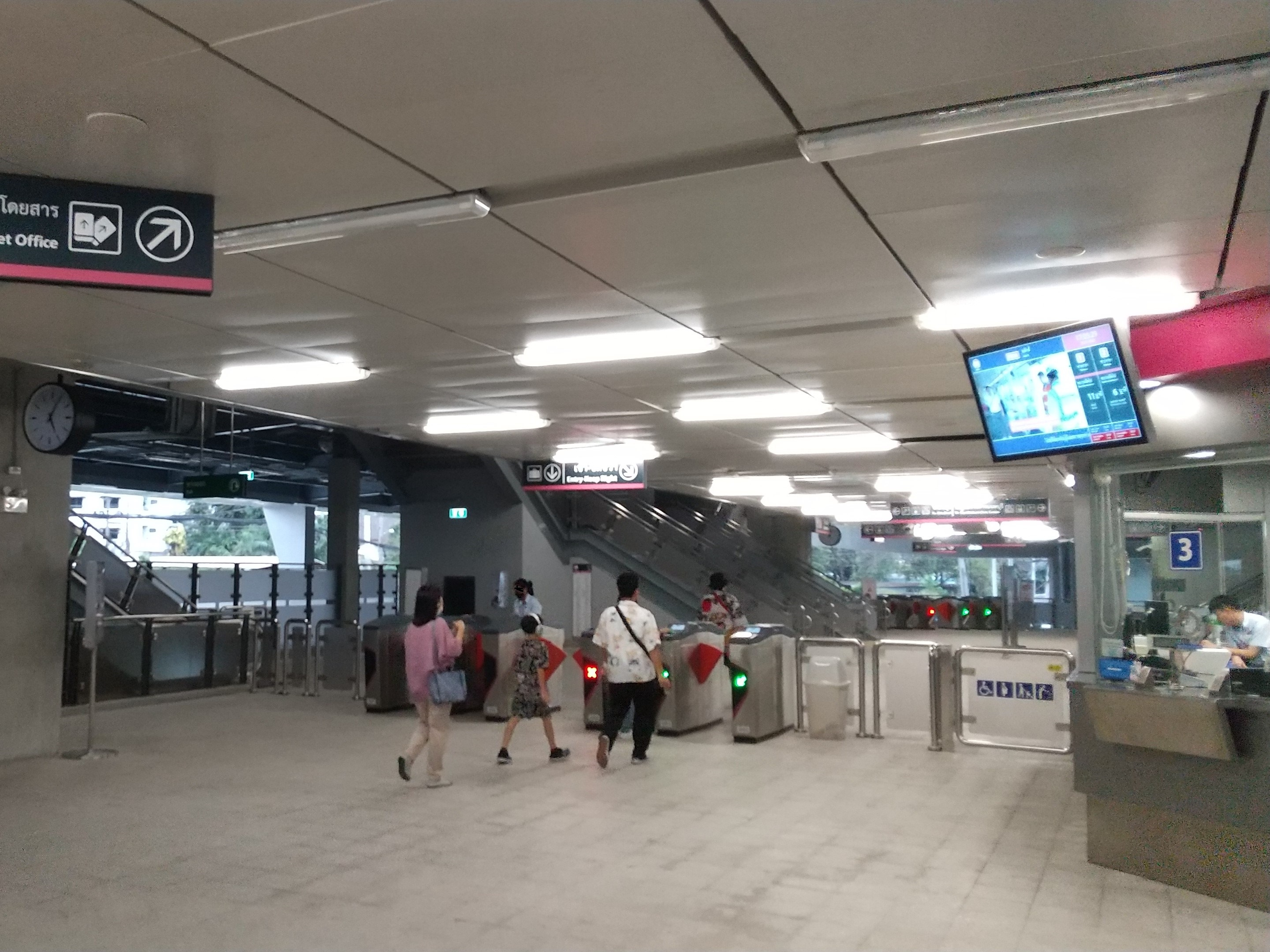
MRT Pink Line concourse

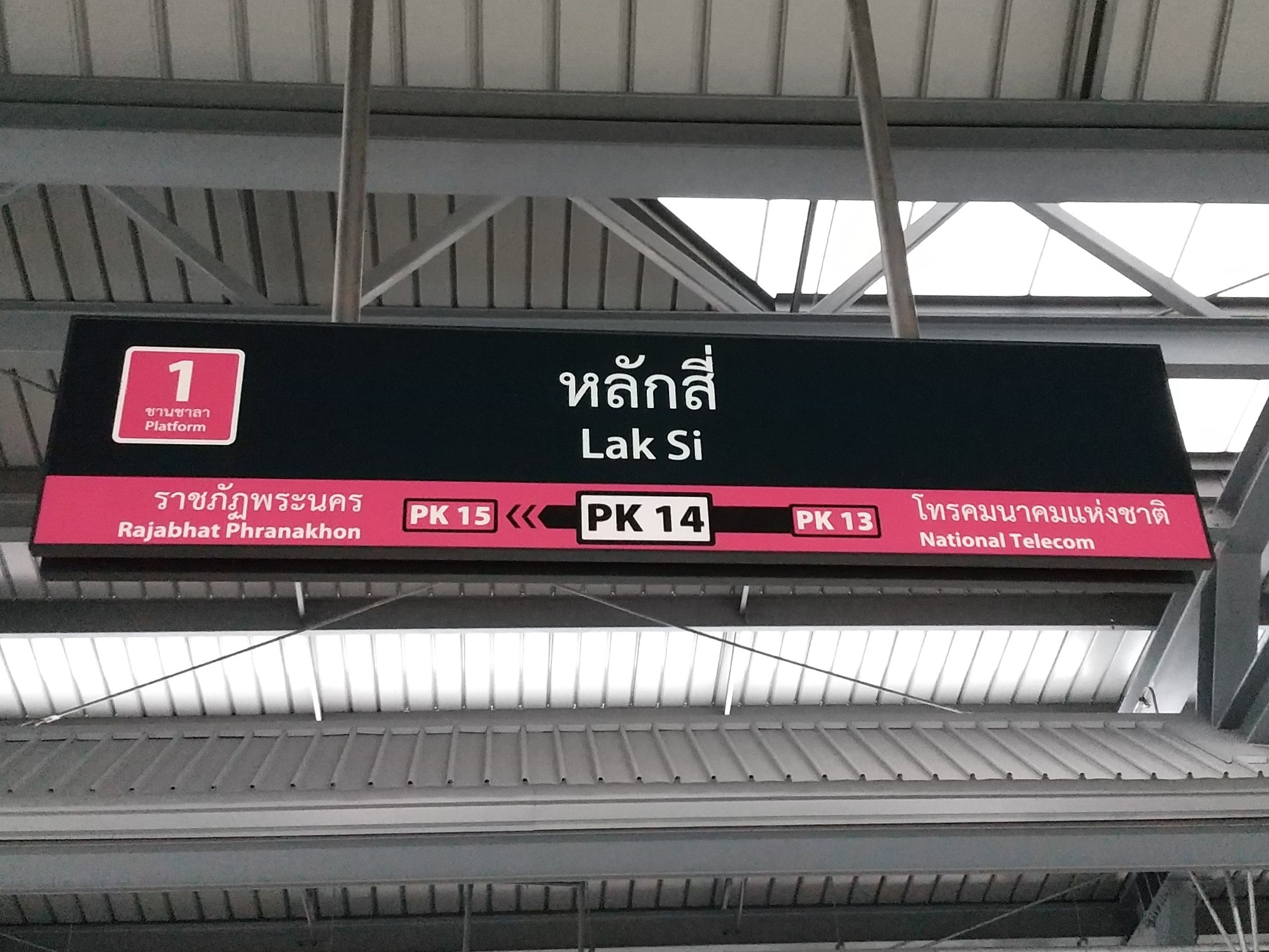
MRT Pink Line signage

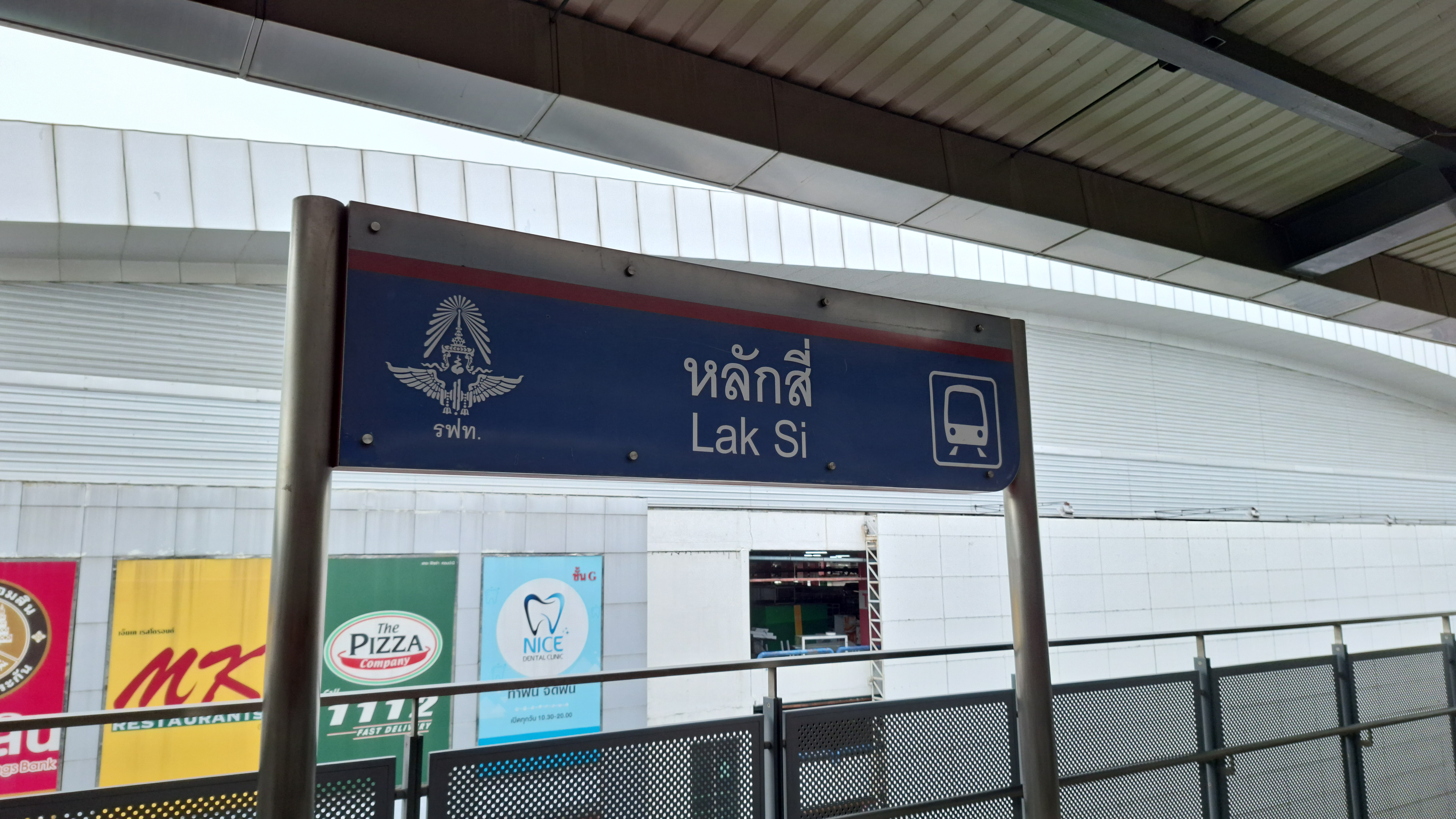
SRT Red Line station signage
