= Anusawari Subdistrict =

Khwaeng in Bangkok

Anusawari อนุสาวรีย์
- Khwaeng
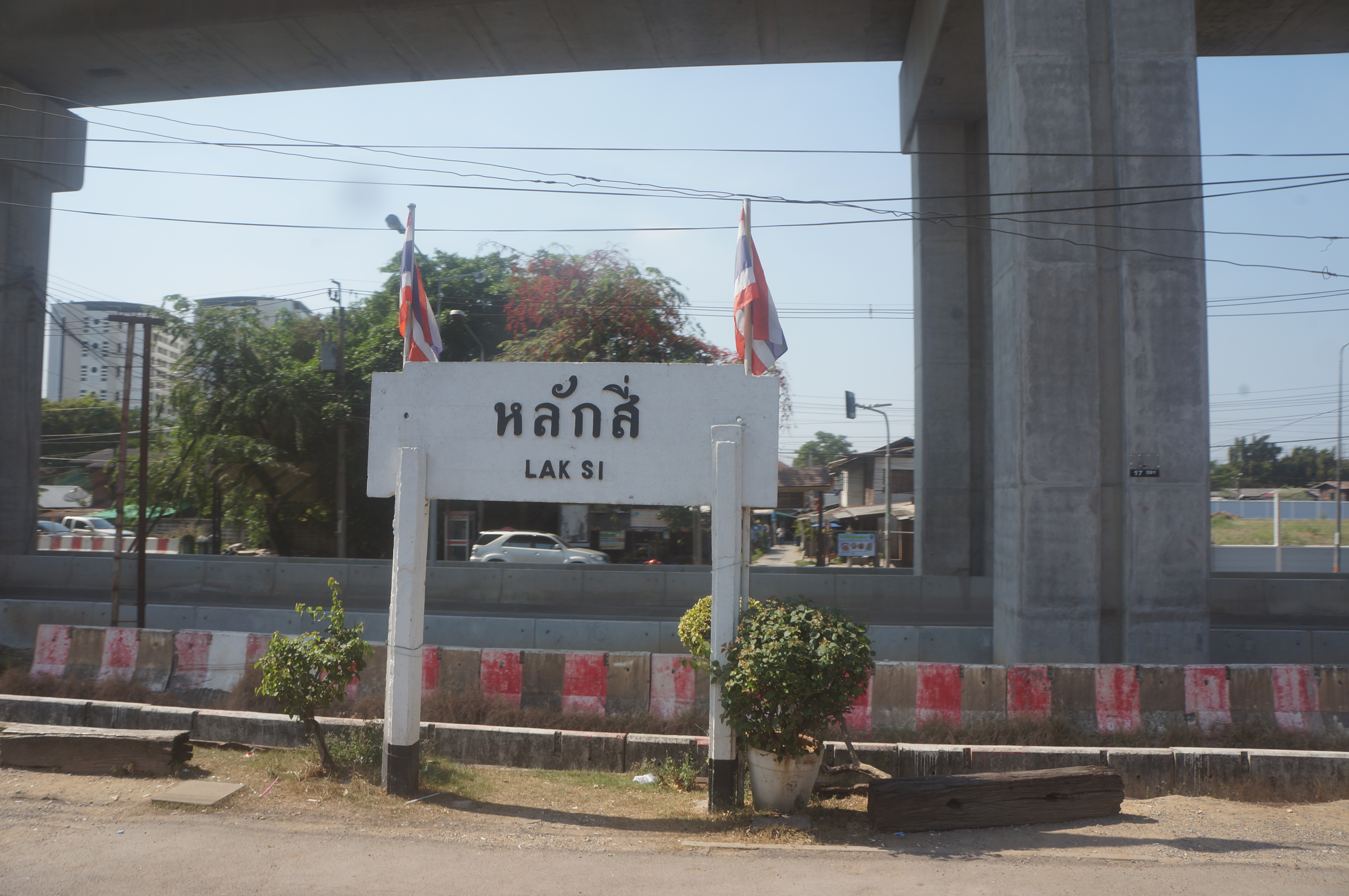
- Lak Si Station, located in Anusawari Subdistrict.

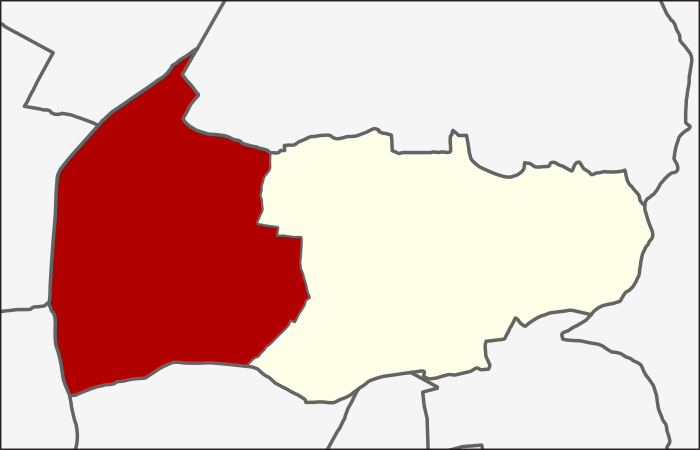
- Location in Bang Khen District
- Country: Thailand
- Province: Bangkok
- Khet: Bang Khen

Area
  - Total: 18.406 km^{2} (7.107 sq mi)

Population (2023)
  - Total: 85,903
- Time zone: UTC+7 (ICT)
- Postal code: 10220
- TIS 1099: 100502

Anusawari (Thai: อนุสาวรีย์, pronounced [ʔa.nú.sǎːw.ríː]) is a Khwaeng (subdistrict) of Bang Khen District, Bangkok. In 2023, it had a population of 85,903.
