= Wat Phra Si Mahathat =

Buddhist temple in Bangkok, Thailand

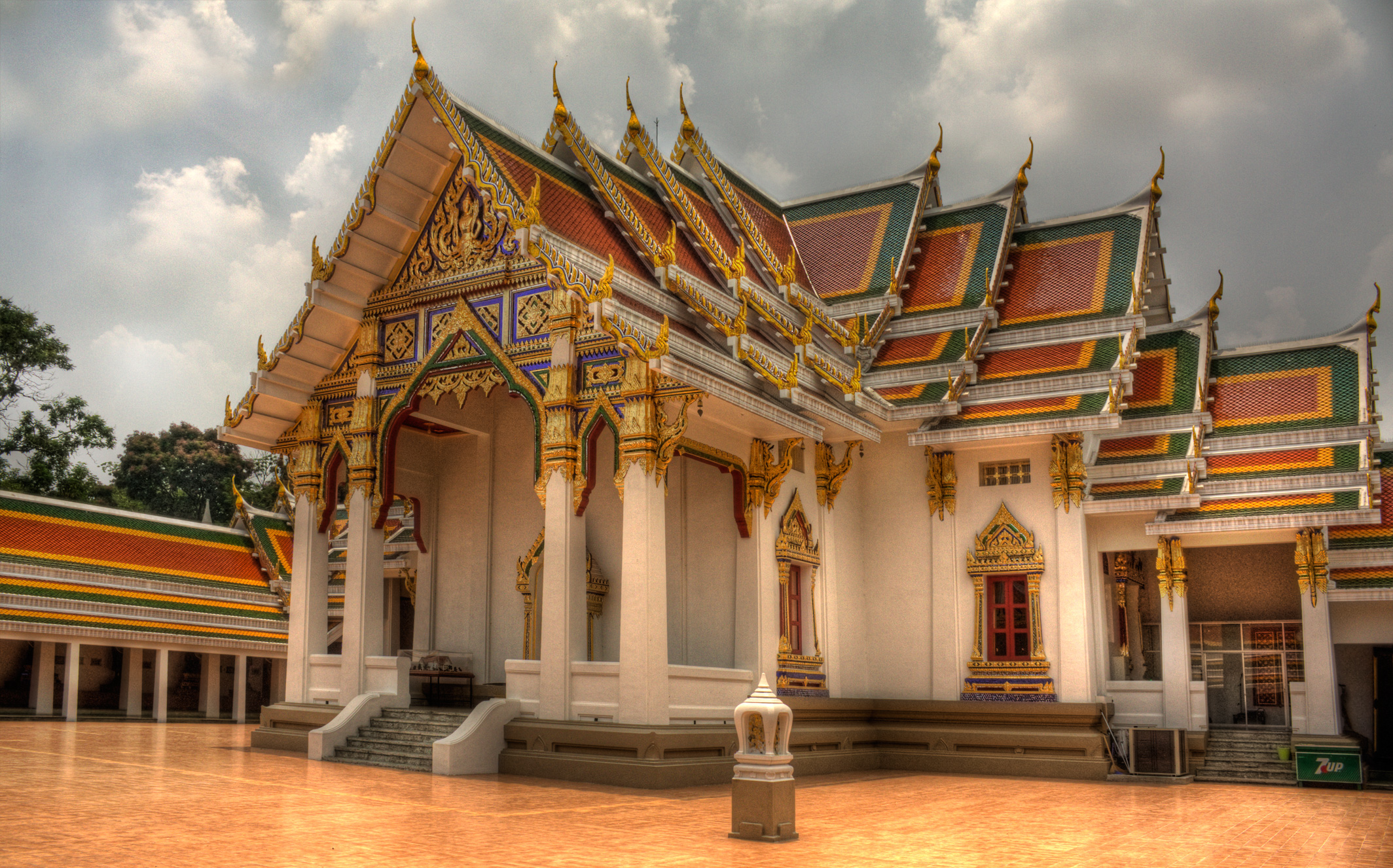
- Ubosot of Wat Phra Si Mahathat

- Location within Bangkok

Religion
- Affiliation: Theravada Buddhism
- Sect: Dhammayuttika Nikaya

Location
- Country: Bang Khen District, Bangkok, Thailand
- Coordinates: 13°52′27.249774″N 100°35′36.145592″E

Architecture
- Founder: Royal Thai Government
- Completed: 1942

Website
- Wat Phra Si Mahathat

Wat Phra Si Mahathat Wora Maha Viharn (Thai: วัดพระศรีมหาธาตุวรมหาวิหาร) is a Buddhist temple in the Bang Khen District of Bangkok. Construction began in 20 March 1941 in commemoration of the government victory over the Boworadet rebellion in 1933. Wat Phra Si Mahathat was designated a first-class royal monastery in 1942, making it one of the most significant temples in Thailand.

The temple is served by Wat Phra Sri Mahathat station an interchange station with paid area integration on Sukhumvit Line and Pink Line.

== History ==
Intended to be called Wat Prachathipatai (Thai: วัดประชาธิปไตย: Temple of Democracy), the temple was the initiative of Prime minister Plaek Phibunsongkhram. The temple would be the first temple built by the state, after the introduction of democracy following the Siamese revolution of 1932. The temple would be built close the Constitution Defense Monument in Bang Khen District's Lak Si Circle, which was near the site of a battle between the government led by the Khana Ratsadon (People's Party) and royalists under Prince Boworadet in 1933. The temple is significant: "not only for the government to ideologically proclaim their victory over the conservative royalists, but also to symbolize the efforts by the People’s Party to shape the political landscape of the country."

In 1940, Thawan Thamrongnawasawat the Minister of Justice was made a special envoy and sent on a mission to British India. As result of this trip the minister received a piece of the Buddha's relic found at Dharmarajika Stupa, Taxila, modern day Pakistan. Thawan also brought back five branches of the Bodhi Tree (at the Mahabodhi Temple) and some soil samples from various sacred Buddhist sites. The government decided to enshrined all of these relics at the temple and the temple's name was changed to Wat Phra Si Mahathat (Temple of the Sacred relics). In 1941 the government raised the status of the temple to that of a first-class royal monastery and the name was altered to Wat Phra Si Mahathat Wora Maha Viharn.

The construction of the temple was completed on 24 June 1942, precisely on the tenth anniversary of the revolution.

== Gallery ==
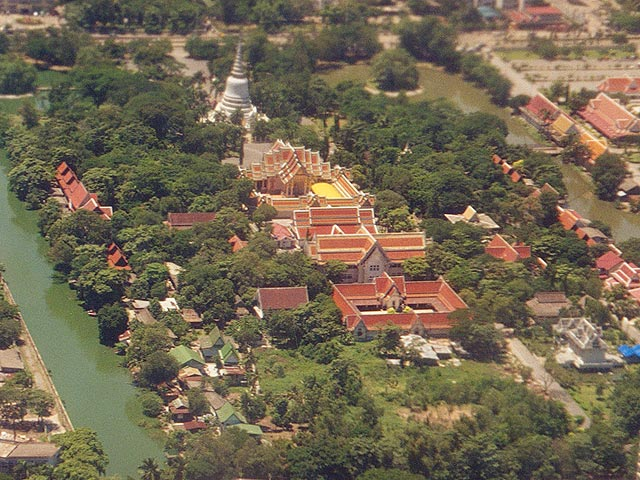
View of the temple from above in 2001

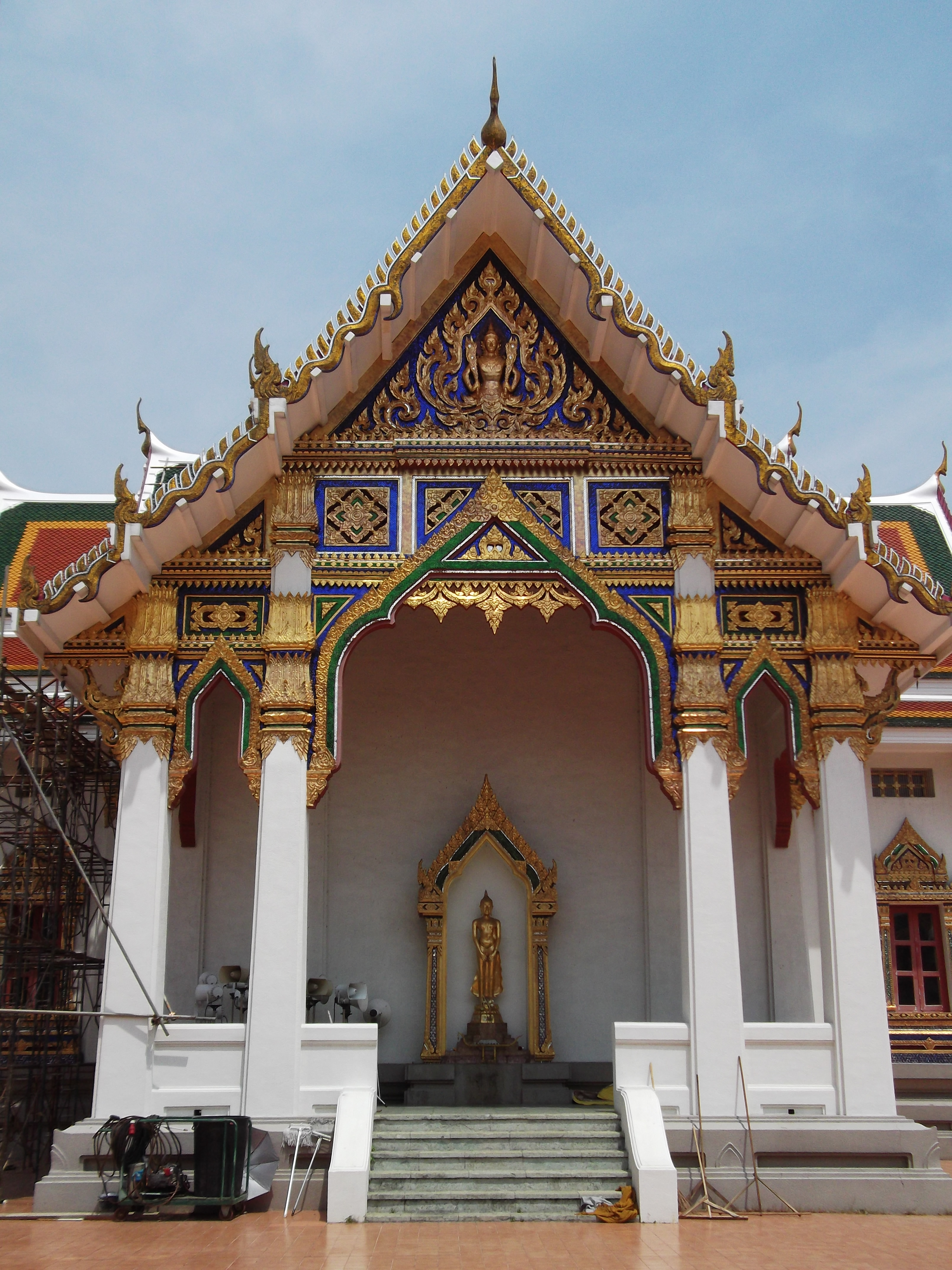
The back of the vihara of the temple

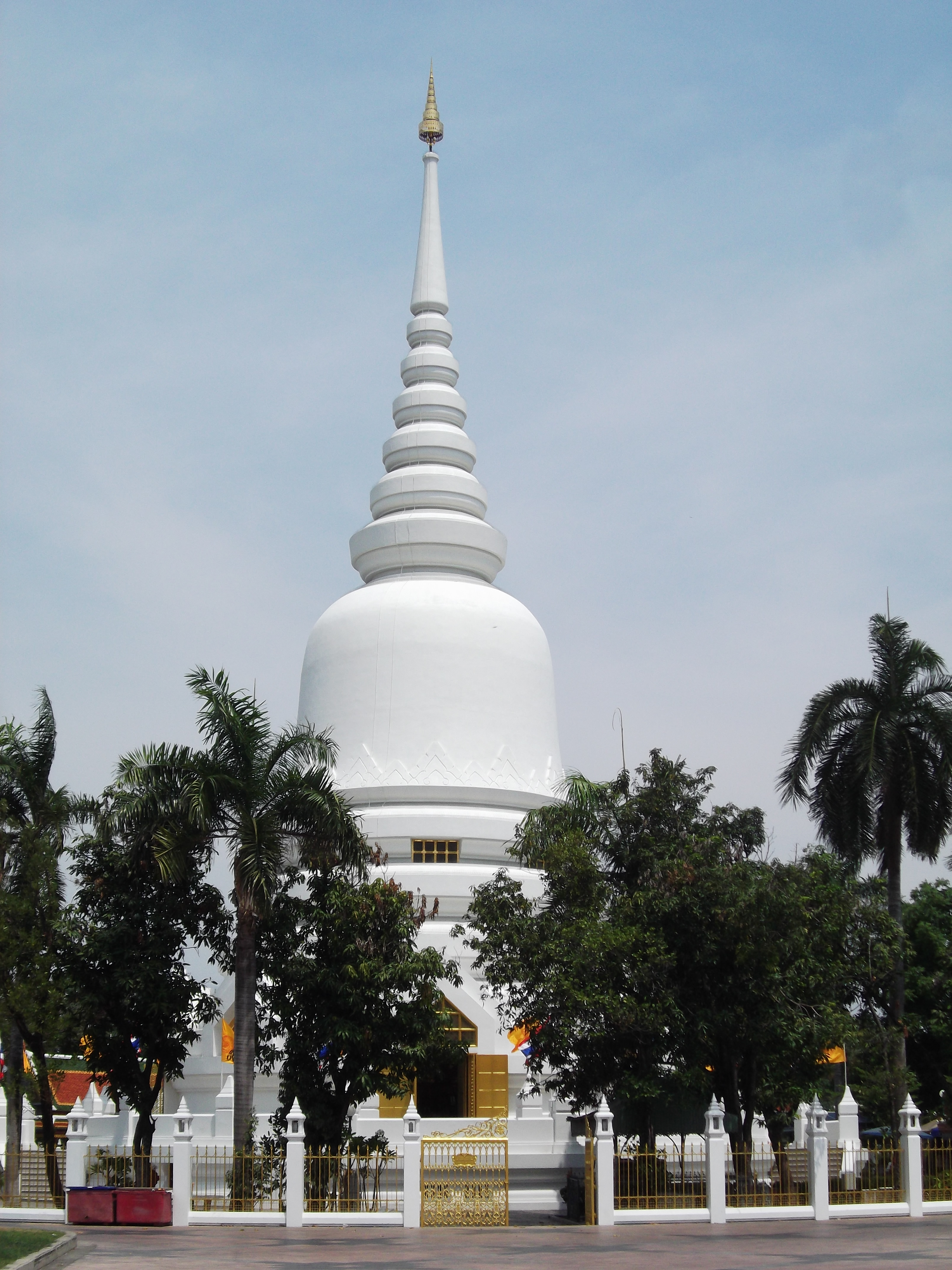
The great stupa of the temple

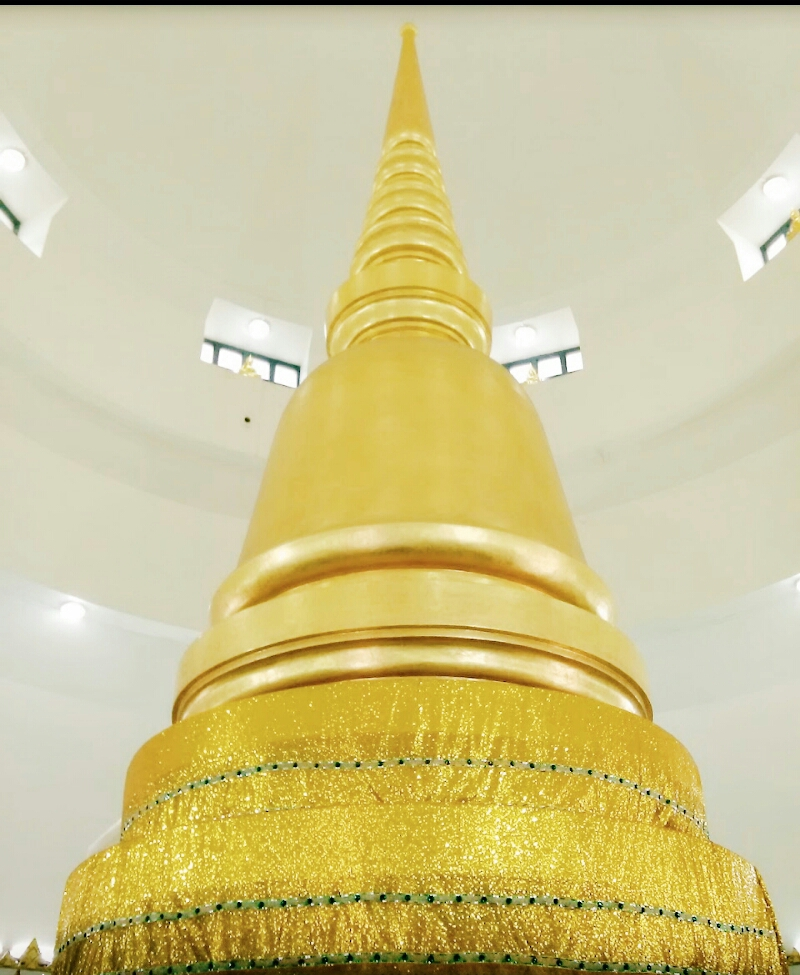
Inside the great stupa, a smaller golden stupa containing the relics of the Buddha

== See also ==
- List of Buddhist temples in Thailand
- Plaek Phibunsongkhram
- Thawan Thamrongnawasawat
- Dhammayuttika Nikaya
