= Wat Phra Sri Mahathat station =

Railway station in Bangkok, Thailand

Wat Phra Sri Mahathat วัดพระศรีมหาธาตุ
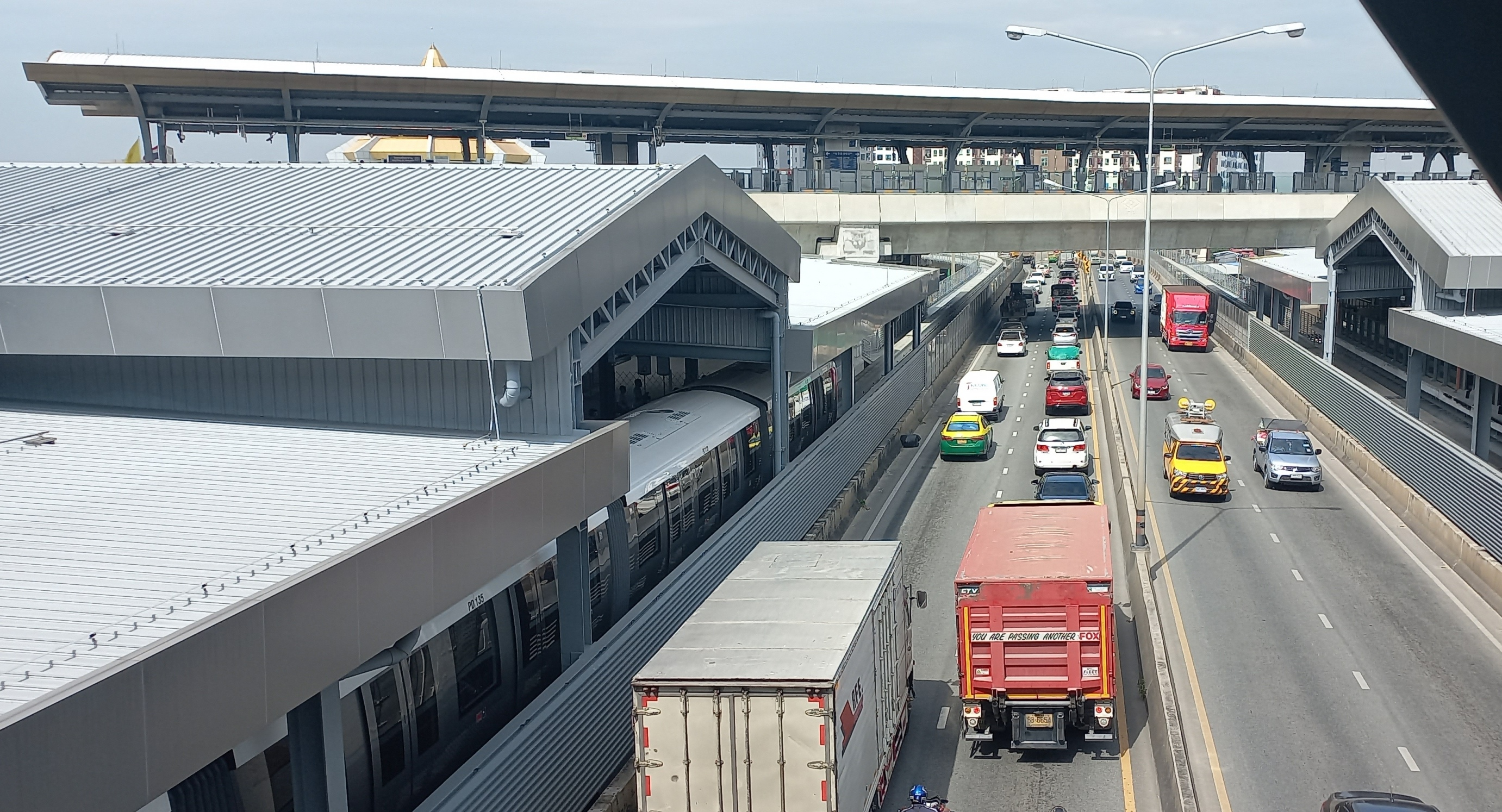
- In this image, the Pink Line platforms of Wat Phra Sri Mahathat station is located closer to the camera than the Sukhumvit Line platforms.

General information
- Location: Bang Khen, Bangkok, Thailand
- Coordinates: 13.8752°N 100.5967°E
- System: BTS MRT
- Owner: Bangkok Metropolitan Administration (BMA)
- Operator: Bangkok Mass Transit System; Public Company Limited (BTSC) (BTS); Northern Bangkok Monorail Company Limited (NBM) (MRT)
- Line: Sukhumvit Line Pink Line
- Platforms: Island

Other information
- Station code: N17 (BTS); PK16 (MRT)

History
- Opened: 5 June 2020 (BTS); 21 November 2023 (MRT)

Passengers
- 2021: 1,320,765 (BTS)

Services
Preceding station	BTS Skytrain	Following station
Phahonyothin 59 towards Khu Khot	Sukhumvit Line	11th Infantry Regiment towards Kheha
Preceding station	Metropolitan Rapid Transit	Following station
Rajabhat Phranakhon towards Nonthaburi Civic Center	Pink Line	Ram Inthra 3 towards Min Buri
Location

Wat Phra Sri Mahathat Station BTS sign

Wat Phra Sri Mahathat station (Thai: สถานีวัดพระศรีมหาธาตุ, RTGS: Sathani Wat Phra Si Maha That, pronounced [sā.tʰǎː.nīː wát pʰráʔ sǐː mā.hǎː tʰâːt]) is a BTS Skytrain and MRT station, on the Sukhumvit Line and MRT Pink Line in Bangkok, Thailand. It is located above Bang Khen roundabout; where Phahon Yothin, Ram Inthra and Chaeng Watthana Roads meet. and has an elevated walkway to Lotus's Lak Si, Wat Phra Si Mahathat and Bang Khen district office. The BTS station is one of the few stations on the line with an island platform. The BTS station is part of the northern extension of the Sukhumvit Line and opened on 5 June 2020, as part of phase 3.

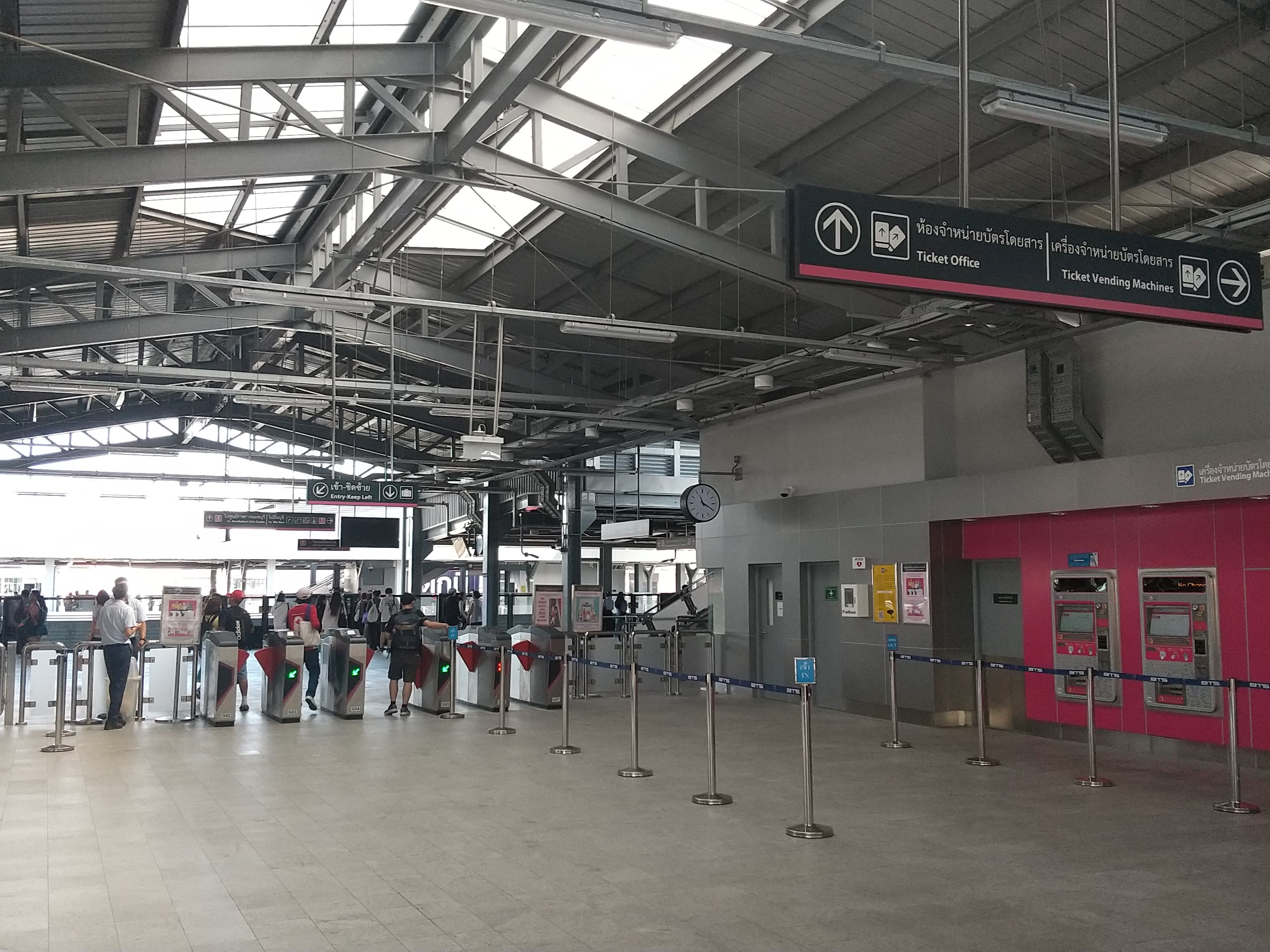
Pink Line concourse and platforms

The MRT Pink Line station opened on November 21, 2023 along with the rest of the Pink Line for trial operation. Passengers can interchange between the two lines within the paid area without purchasing another ticket. This is possible because the operators of the two lines share common ownership.

== See also ==
Other interchange stations in Bangkok with paid area integration.

- Krung Thep Aphiwat Central Terminal (Bang Sue Grand Station)
- Muang Thong Thani MRT station
- Siam BTS station
- Tao Poon MRT station
