= Bang Khen district =

Bang Khen บางเขน
- Khet
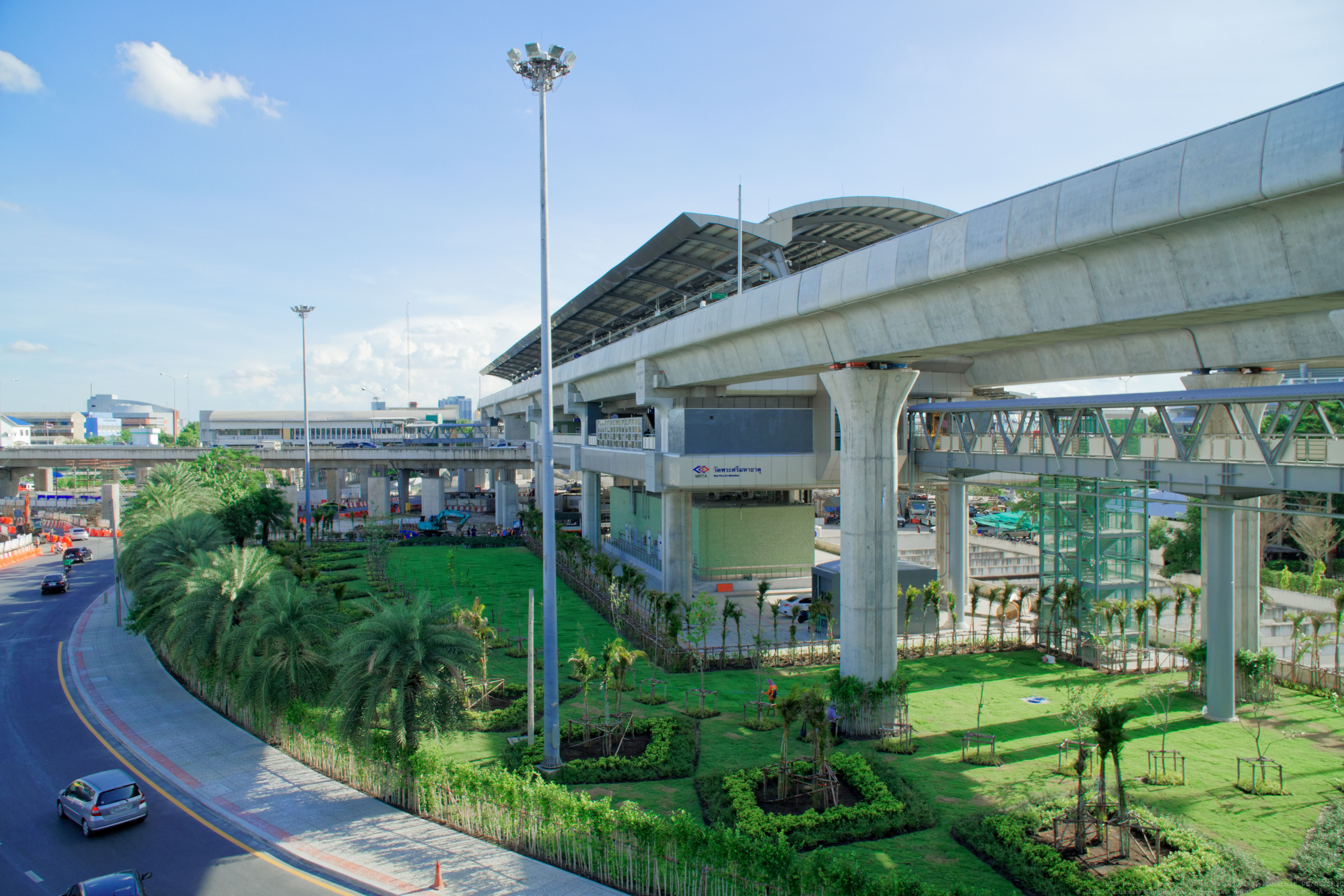
- Bang Khen roundabout, the location where Constitution Defense Monument once stood, is now occupied by Wat Phra Sri Mahathat station

- Khet location in Bangkok
- Coordinates: 13°52′26″N 100°35′47″E
- Country: Thailand
- Province: Bangkok
- Seat: Anusawari
- Khwaeng: 2

Area
  - Total: 42.123 km^{2} (16.264 sq mi)

Population (2017)
  - Total: 190,681
  - Density: 4,526.76/km^{2} (11,724.3/sq mi)
- Time zone: UTC+7 (ICT)
- Postal code: 10220 except Mu 8-10 of Tha Raeng: 10230
- Geocode: 1005

Bang Khen (Thai: บางเขน, pronounced [bāːŋ kʰěːn]) is one of the 50 districts (khet) of Bangkok, Thailand. It is bounded by other Bangkok districts (from north clockwise): Sai Mai, Khlong Sam Wa, Khan Na Yao, Bueng Kum, Lat Phrao, Chatuchak, Lak Si, and Don Mueang.

== History ==
Bang Khen was established as an amphoe (district) of Phra Nakhon Province in 1897. The district occupied a vast plain in northern Bangkok known as "Thung Bang Khen" (ทุ่งบางเขน, lit. 'Bang Khen Field'), which was largely dominated by farmland. In October 1933, it became a battleground during the Boworadet Rebellion, a confrontation between the troops of Prince Boworadet and government forces.

The name "Bang Khen" is believed to be a corrupted form of "Bang Ken" (บางเข็น), meaning "place of pushing". According to a regional folk tale, as told in the "Legend of Lord Uthong" (ตำนานท้าวอู่ทอง), a golden barge belonging to Lord Uthong (a mythical figure, not King Uthong of Ayutthaya) ran aground in a shallow canal. The crew had to wade into the water and push ("ken" in Thai) the barge through the shallow, difficult passage, which gave rise to the name.

In 1972, Thonburi and Phra Nakhon Provinces were combined and called Krung Thep Maha Nakhon. Administrative units within the capital were renamed "districts" (khet) and "sub-district" (khwaeng), replacing "amphoe" and "tambon" respectively. Bang Khen became a district in the newly combined province. At that time it had eight sub-districts.

Bang Khen was once a very large district, but has been reduced in size after several modifications to district boundaries. In 1989, western and southwestern portions were split off to create Don Mueang district and Chatuchak district respectively. In 1997, a northern portion of Bang Khen was split off to create Sai Mai district, but in the same reorganization Bang Khen received Mu 8-10 of Chorakhe Bua subdistrict from Lat Phrao district.

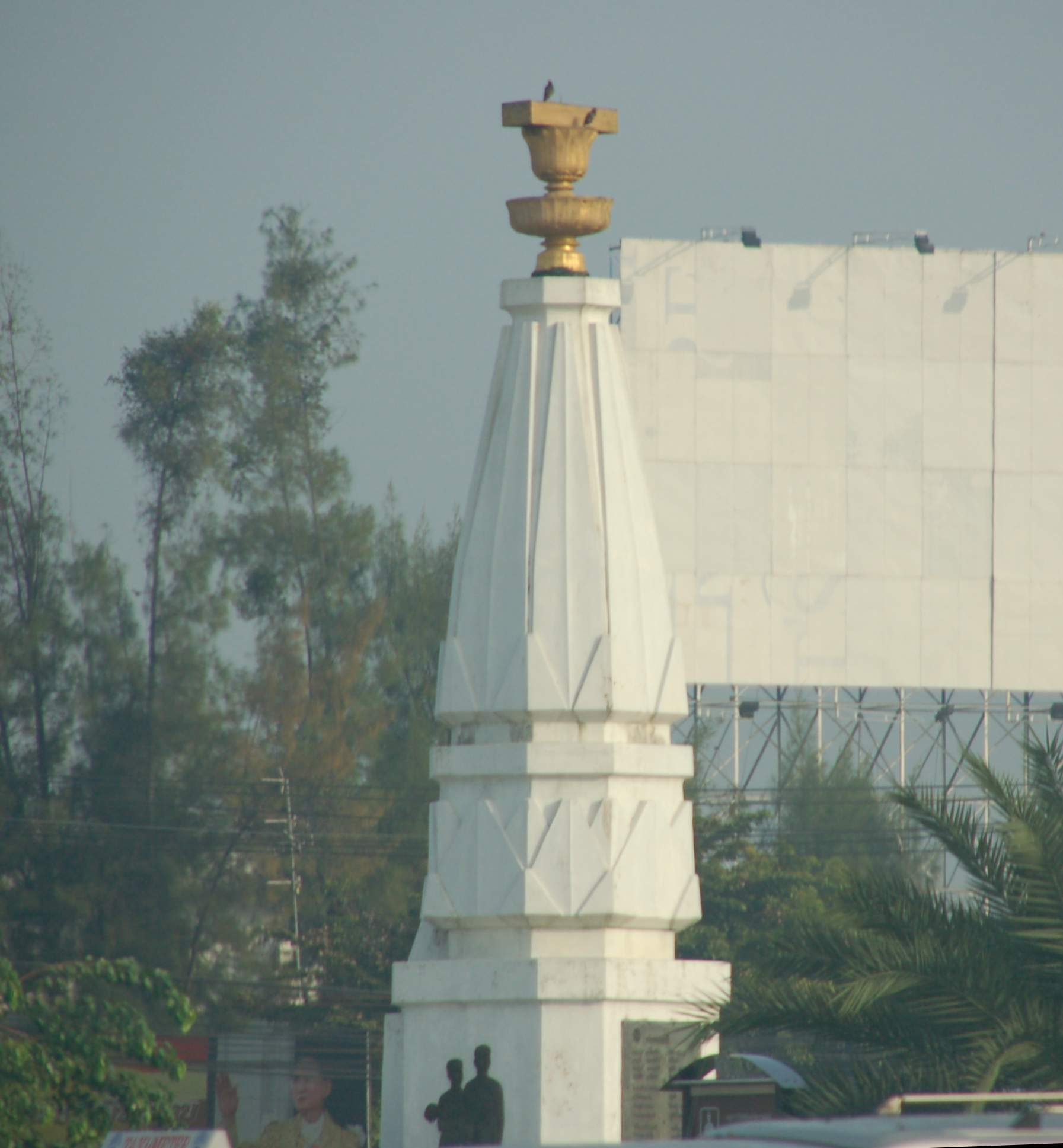
Anusawari Lak Si, aka Constitutional Protection Monument, a monument of Boworadet rebellion

As of 2018 the Thai Army's 11th Infantry Division occupies 3,000 rai (480 ha; 1,200 acres) of land in Bang Khen.

== Administration ==
The district is divided into two sub-districts (khwaeng).

No.	Name	Thai	Area (km^{2})	Map
2.	Anusawari	อนุสาวรีย์	18.406	Map
8.	Tha Raeng	ท่าแร้ง	23.717	Map
Total			42.123	Map

The missing numbers 1, 3, 4, 5, 6 and 7 belong to the sub-districts which were split off to form Chatuchak, Sai Mai and Don Mueang districts.

== District council ==
The Bang Khen district council has eight members, who serve four-year terms. Elections were last held on 30 April 2006. The Thai Rak Thai Party won all eight seats.

== Places of interest ==
- Wat Phra Si Mahathat Wora Maha Wiharn (วัดพระศรีมหาธาตุวรมหาวิหาร) Temple of Holy Relics
- Constitution Defense Monument (อนุสาวรีย์พิทักษ์รัฐธรรมนูญ) at Lak Si Circle (วงเวียนหลักสี่)
- Sathira Dhammasathan (เสถียรธรรมสถาน) Buddhist Retreat Center
- Ying Charoen Market (ตลาดยิ่งเจริญ) or Saphan Mai Market (ตลาดสะพานใหม่). The original name of Saphan Mai was Saphan Sukoranakhaseni (สะพานสุกรนาคเสนีย์)
- Lumpinee Boxing Stadium (สนามมวยเวทีลุมพินี) Muay Thai arena moved from Pathum Wan in 2014

== Education ==
- Phranakhon Rajabhat University, (Khwaeng Anusawari)
- Rattanakosin Somphot Bangkhen School, (Khwaeng Tha Raeng)
- Bang Khen District non-formal and informal Education, (Khwaeng Anusawari)
- Krirk University
