= Highway 304 (Thailand) =

National highway of Thailand

National Highway 304
- ทางหลวงแผ่นดินหมายเลข 304
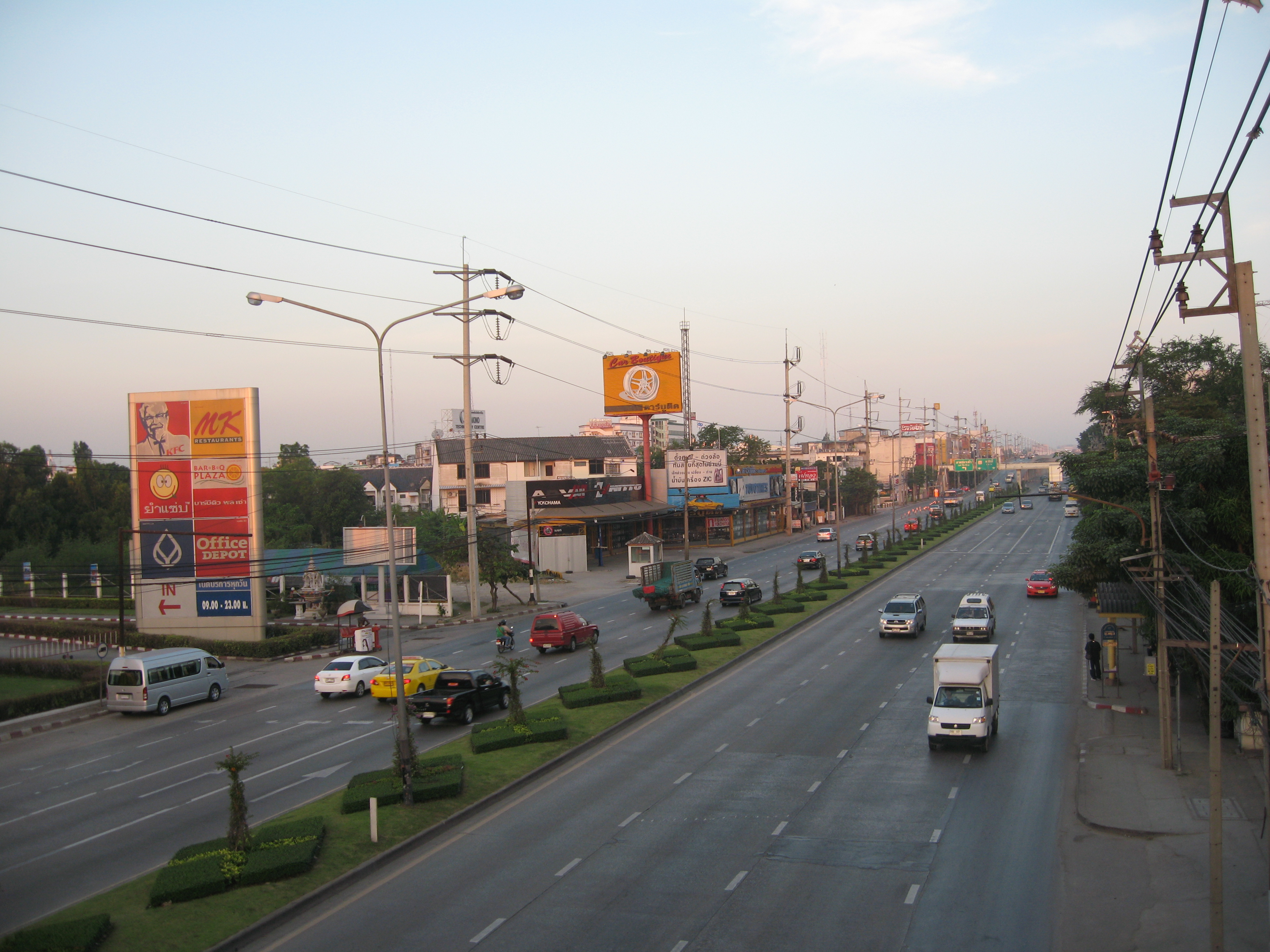
- Ram Inthra Road in Bangkok's Bang Khen District

Route information
- Part of AH19
- Length: 296.7 km (184.4 mi)

Major junctions
- From: Hwy 306 at Pak Kret
- To: Hwy 2 at Nakhon Ratchasima

Location
- Country: Thailand

Highway system
- Highways in Thailand; Motorways; Asian Highways

Highway 304 is a national highway of Thailand, leading from the Bangkok suburb city of Pak Kret to Nakhon Ratchasima in the country's Northeast. It forms the main link between the eastern and northeastern regions, and is one of the major alternative routes into the Northeast (the main route from Bangkok being Mittraphap Road, Highway 2).

The highway is known by several names along its route. Chaeng Watthana Road (Thai: ถนนแจ้งวัฒนะ, also spelled Chaeng Wattana) begins at Pak Kret in Nonthaburi Province, and leads eastward (and slightly south) to Bang Khen roundabout (Where Wat Phra Sri Mahathat station currently occupies) in Bangkok's Bang Khen District, where it crosses Phahon Yothin Road and from there becomes known as Ram Inthra Road (ถนนรามอินทรา, also spelled Ram Intra or Ramindra) until it reaches Min Buri in Bangkok's eastern fringes. It then becomes known as Suwinthawong Road (ถนนสุวินทวงศ์) towards the town of Chachoengsao. From there, it continues mostly northeastward through the eastern province of the same name, past the town of Phanom Sarakham, then enters Prachin Buri Province where it crosses Highway 33 at Kabin Buri town. It then leads north, crossing the Sankamphaeng Mountains through a pass between Khao Yai and Thap Lan national parks into Nakhon Ratchasima Province. There, it passes through Wang Nam Khio and Pak Thong Chai districts before joining Mittraphap Road as it enters the city of Nakhon Ratchasima. Part of the highway is designated as Asian Highway 19.

The road was constructed in segments. The Chaeng Watthana and Suwinthawong sections were named in 1950, while the section from Chachoengsao to Nakhon Ratchasima (originally designated Highway 23) was built from 1941, and was initially unpaved. The Kabin Buri–Nakhon Ratchasima section was built and paved from 1965 to 1968 with assistance from the United States Army to support the USAF bases in Thailand during the Vietnam War. The road, which cuts through the Dong Phayayen–Khao Yai Forest Complex World Heritage Site, underwent expansion into a four-lane highway from 2015 to 2018, which included the construction of bridges and underpasses to serve as wildlife corridors, the first in Thailand.

== Gallery ==
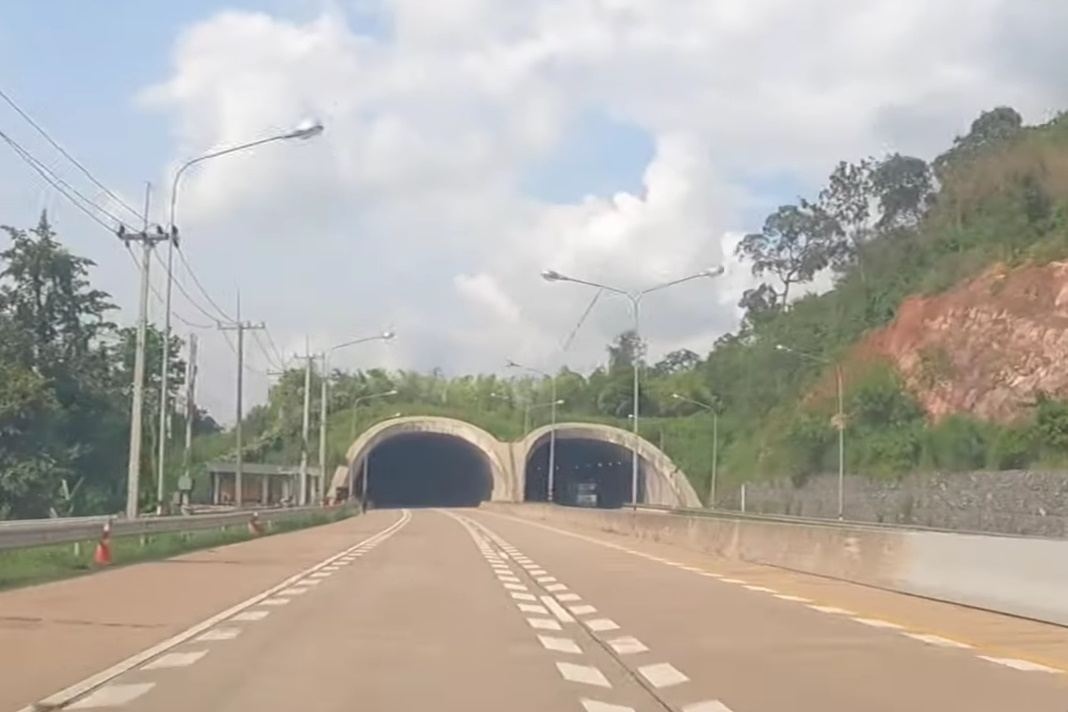
Wildlife overpass linking Khao Yai and Thap Lan national parks
