= Pak Kret subdistrict =

Pak Kret Subdistrict ตำบลปากเกร็ด
- Subdistrict
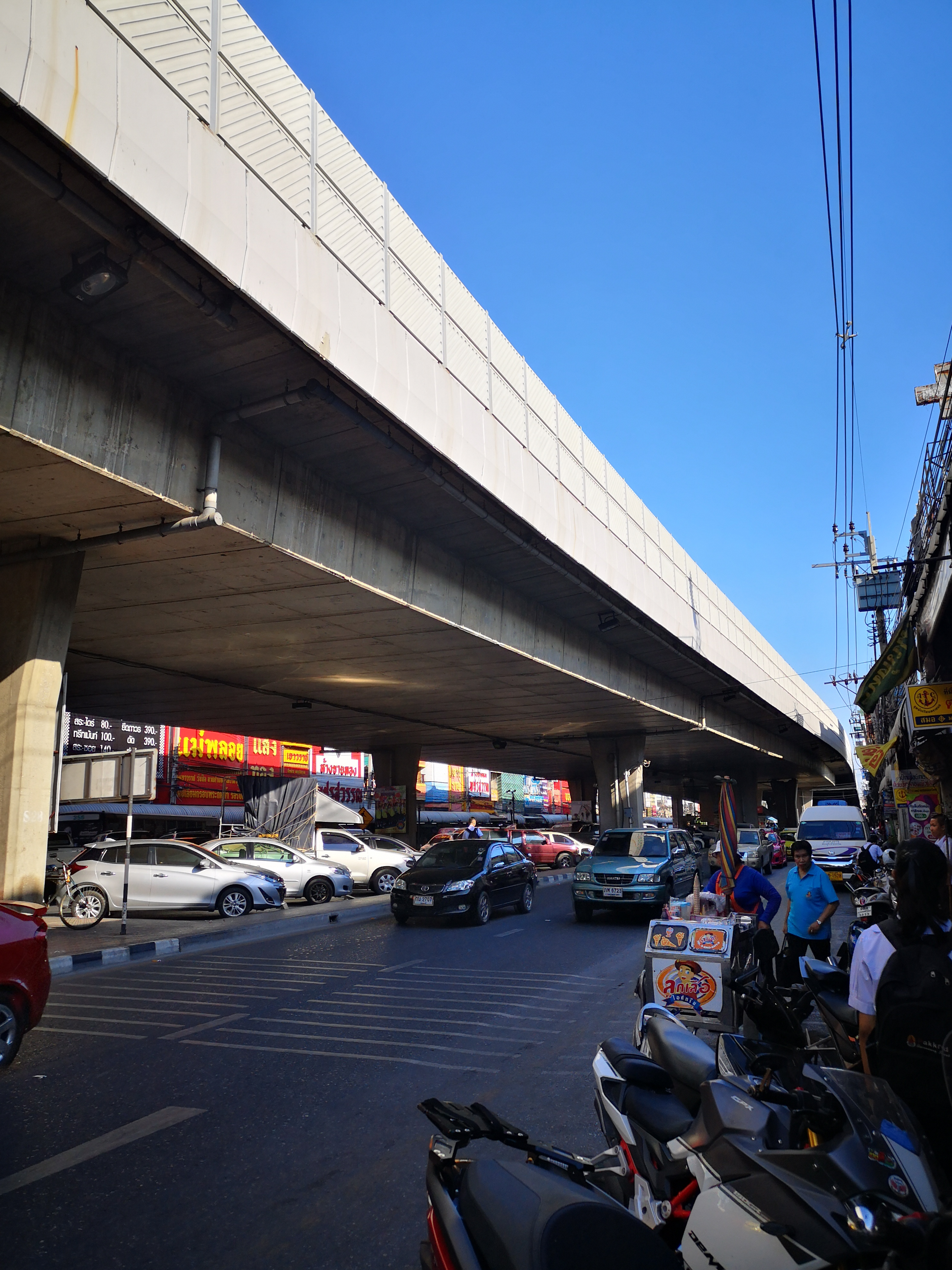
- Chaeng Watthana Road in the subdistrict
- Country: Thailand
- Province: Nonthaburi
- District: Pak Kret

Population (2020)
  - Total: 35,942
- Time zone: UTC+7 (ICT)
- Postal code: 11120
- TIS 1099: 120601

Pak Kret (Thai: ปากเกร็ด, pronounced [pàːk krèt]) is one of the twelve subdistricts (tambon) of Pak Kret district, in Nonthaburi province, Thailand. Neighbouring subdistricts are (from north clockwise) Bang Phut, Khlong Kluea, Bang Talat, Ko Kret and Bang Tanai. In 2020 it had a total population of 35,942 people.

== Administration ==
=== Central administration ===
The subdistrict is subdivided into 5 villages (muban).

No.	Name	Thai
1.	Ban Hat	บ้านหาด
2.	Ban Bo	บ้านบ่อ
3.	Ban Fai Mai	บ้านไฟไหม้
4.	Ban Khlong Kluea	บ้านคลองเกลือ
5.	Ban Sala Khi Pot	บ้านศาลาขี้ปด

=== Local administration ===
The whole area of the subdistrict is covered by Pak Kret City Municipality (เทศบาลนครปากเกร็ด).
