= Bang Talat, Nonthaburi =

Bang Talat Subdistrict ตำบลบางตลาด
- Subdistrict
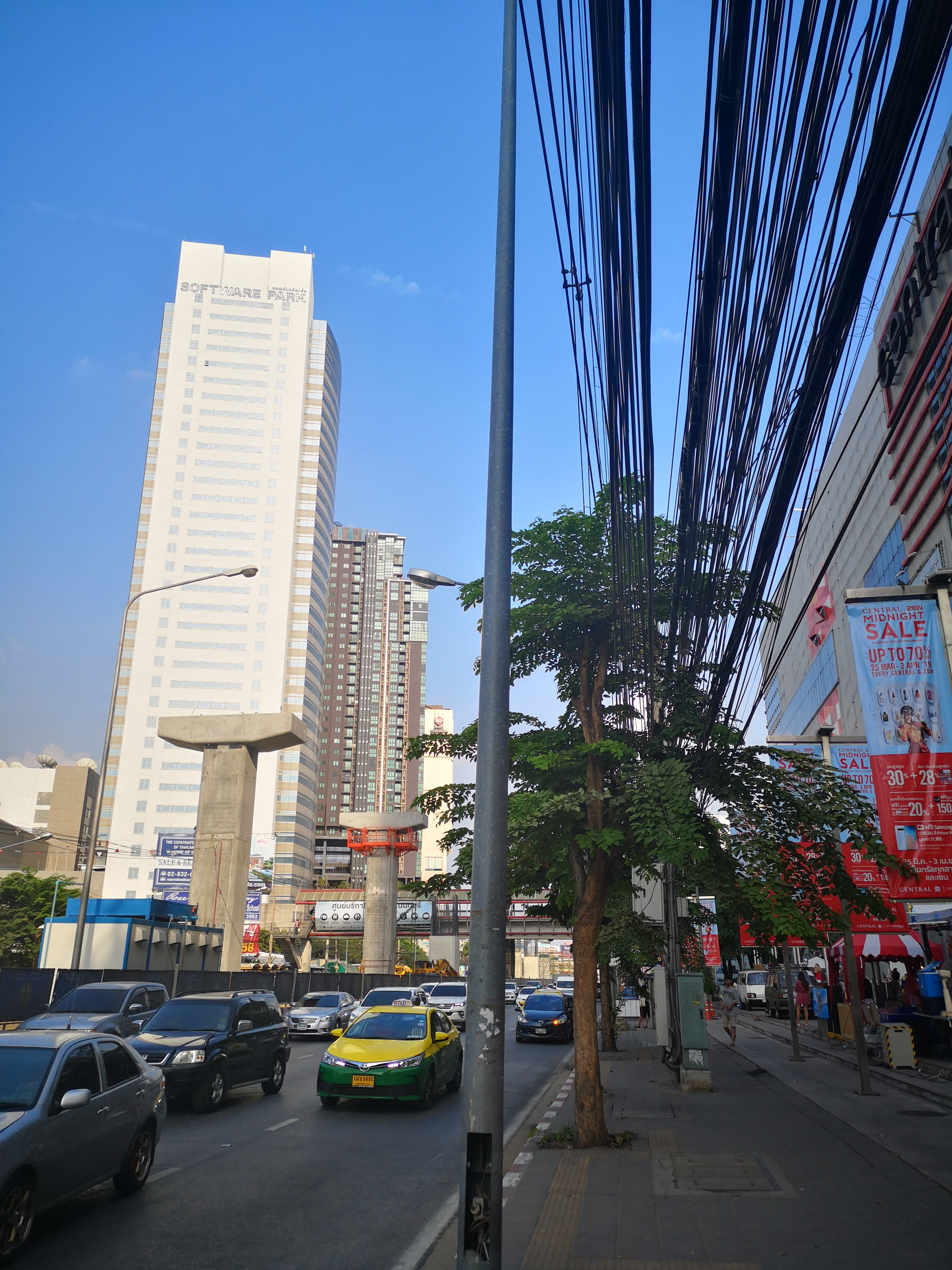
- Chaeng Watthana Road forms part of the northern border of the subdistrict.
- Interactive map of Bang Talat Subdistrict
- Coordinates: 13.8833°N 100.5166°E
- Country: Thailand
- Province: Nonthaburi
- District: Pak Kret

Population (2020)
  - Total: 47,147
- Time zone: UTC+7 (ICT)
- Postal code: 11120
- TIS 1099: 120602

Bang Talat (Thai: บางตลาด, pronounced [bāːŋ tā.làːt]) is one of the twelve subdistricts (tambon) of Pak Kret district, in Nonthaburi province, Thailand. Neighbouring subdistricts are (from north clockwise) Pak Kret, Khlong Kluea, Thung Song Hong, Tha Sai and Tha It and Ko Kret. In 2020, it had a total population of 47,147 people.

== Administration ==
=== Central administration ===
The subdistrict is subdivided into 10 villages (muban).

No.	Name	Thai
1.	Ban Pak Dan	บ้านปากด่าน
2.	Ban Dong Tan	บ้านดงตาล
3.	Ban Surao	บ้านสุเหร่า
4.	Ban Khlong Kluea	บ้านคลองเกลือ
5.	Ban Khlong Kluea	บ้านคลองเกลือ
6.	Ban Dong Tan	บ้านดงตาล
7.	Ban Dong Tan	บ้านดงตาล
8.	Ban Khlong Kluea	บ้านคลองเกลือ
9.	Ban Khlong Kluea	บ้านคลองเกลือ
10.	Ban Pracha Chuen	บ้านประชาชื่น

=== Local administration ===
The whole area of the subdistrict is covered by Pak Kret City Municipality (เทศบาลนครปากเกร็ด).
