= Bang Phut, Nonthaburi =

Coordinates: 13°55′30″N 100°30′59″E

Bang Phut Subdistrict ตำบลบางพูด
- Subdistrict
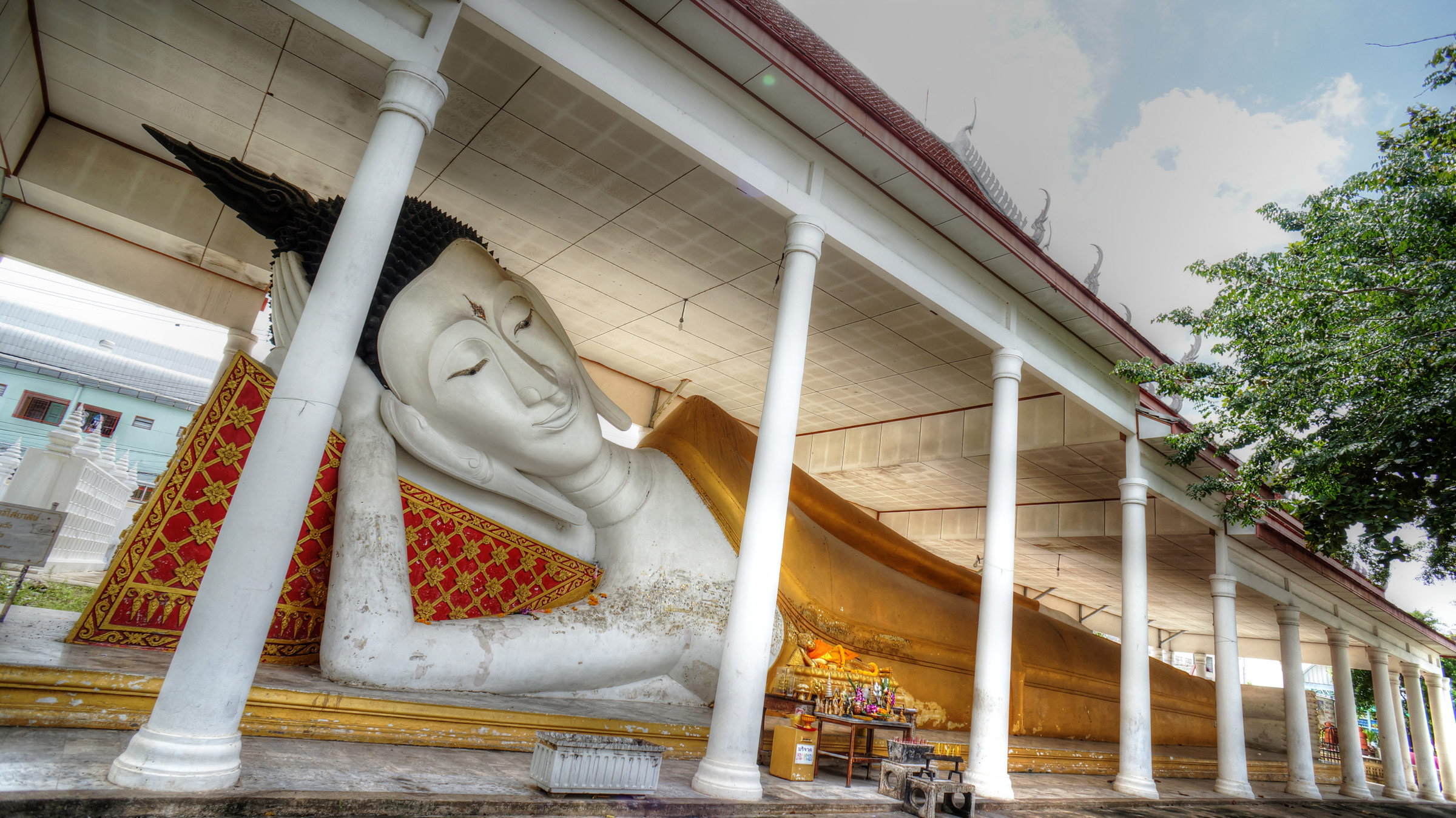
- The ancient reclining Buddha statue of Wat Ku
- Interactive map of Bang Phut Subdistrict
- Country: Thailand
- Province: Nonthaburi
- District: Pak Kret

Population (2020)
  - Total: 63,160
- Time zone: UTC+7 (ICT)
- Postal code: 11120
- TIS 1099: 120604

Bang Phut (Thai: บางพูด, pronounced [bāːŋ pʰûːt]) is one of the twelve subdistricts (tambon) of Pak Kret District, in Nonthaburi Province, Thailand. The subdistrict is bounded by (clockwise from north) Bang Khu Wat, Bang Khayaeng, Ban Mai, Khlong Kluea, Pak Kret and Bang Tanai subdistricts. In 2020, it had a total population of 63,160 people.

== Administration ==
=== Central administration ===
The subdistrict is subdivided into 9 villages (muban).

No.	Name	Thai
1.	Ban Bang Phang	บ้านบางพัง
2.	Ban Bang Phang	บ้านบางพัง
3.	Ban Hong Thong	บ้านหงษ์ทอง
4.	Ban Lao	บ้านลาว
5.	Ban Ku	บ้านกู้
6.	Ban Song	บ้านซ่อง
7.	Ban Bang Phut Nok	บ้านบางพูดนอก
8.	Ban Bang Phut Nai	บ้านบางพูดใน
9.	Ban Thung Klang	บ้านทุ่งกลาง

=== Local administration ===
The whole area of the subdistrict is covered by Pak Kret City Municipality (เทศบาลนครปากเกร็ด).
