= Boonyachinda Stadium =

Sports stadium in Bangkok, Thailand

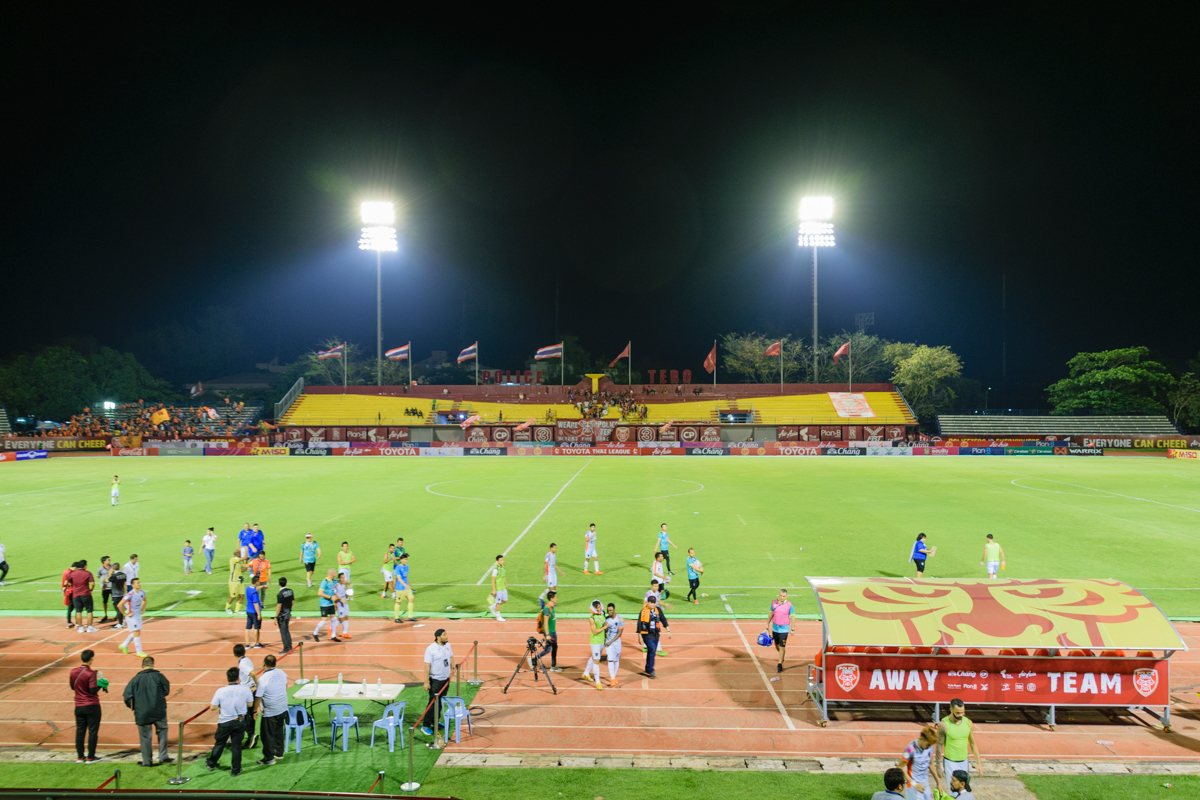
- Interactive map of Boonyachinda Stadium
- Location: Talat Bang Khen, Lak Si, Bangkok, Thailand
- Coordinates: 13°52′02″N 100°34′39″E
- Owner: Royal Thai Police
- Operator: Royal Thai Police
- Capacity: 3,550
- Surface: Grass
- Public transit: SRT Thung Song Hong; MRT Rajabhat Phranakhon; BTS Bang Bua

Construction
- Opened: 1962

Boonyachinda Stadium (Thai: สนามบุณยะจินดา) is a multi-purpose stadium in the Royal Thai Police Sport Club, Lak Si District, Bangkok, Thailand. It is currently used mostly for football matches and was the home stadium of Police Tero. The stadium holds 3,550 people.
