= Khlong Kluea subdistrict =

Khlong Kluea Subdistrict ตำบลคลองเกลือ
- Subdistrict
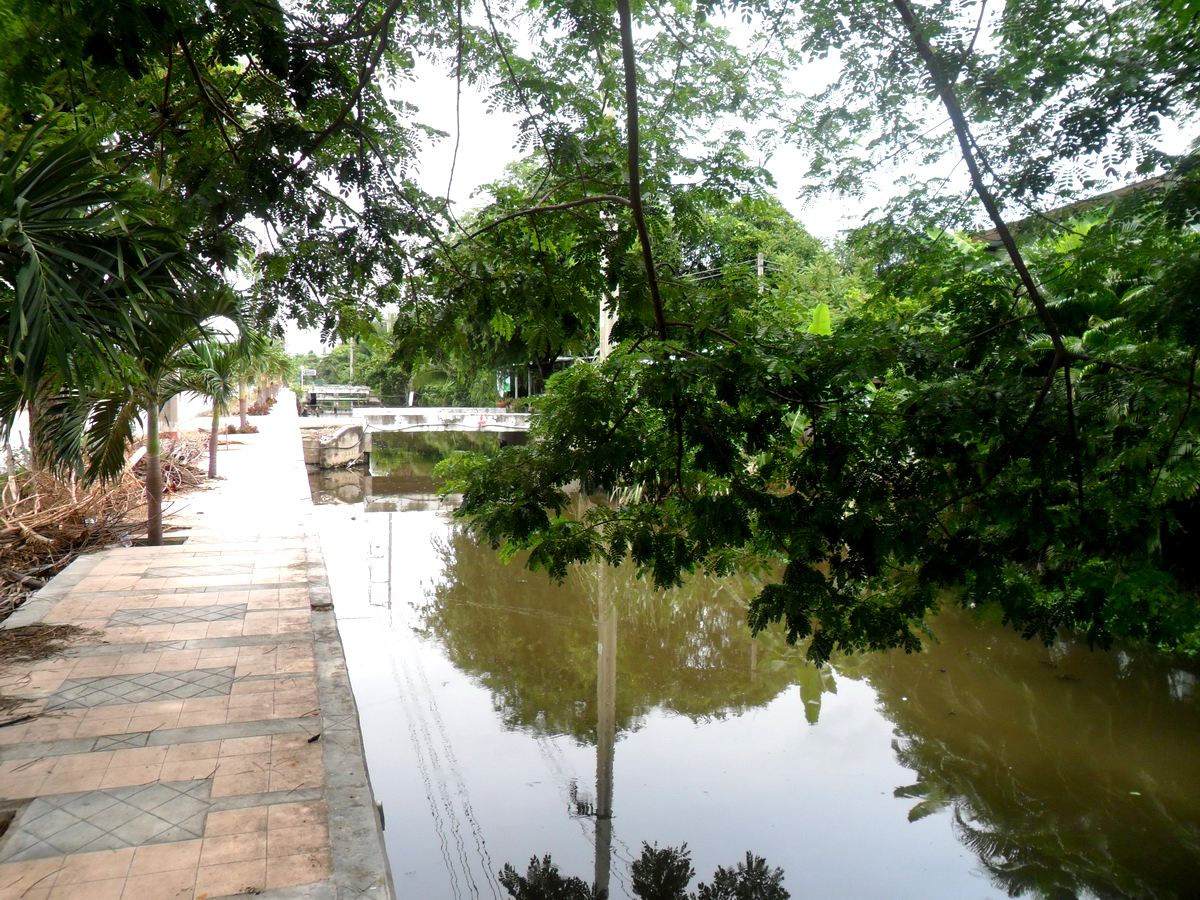
- Khlong Suai at the northeastern corner of the subdistrict area
- Interactive map of Khlong Kluea Subdistrict
- Country: Thailand
- Province: Nonthaburi
- District: Pak Kret

Population (2020)
  - Total: 9,567
- Time zone: UTC+7 (ICT)
- Postal code: 11120
- TIS 1099: 120612

Khlong Kluea (Thai: คลองเกลือ, pronounced [kʰlɔ̄ːŋ klɯ̄a̯]) is one of the twelve subdistricts (tambon) of Pak Kret District, in Nonthaburi Province, Thailand. The subdistrict is bounded by (clockwise from north) Bang Phut, Ban Mai, Thung Song Hong, Bang Talat and Pak Kret subdistricts. In 2020 it had a total population of 9,567 people.

== Administration ==
=== Central administration ===
The subdistrict is subdivided into 4 villages (muban).

No.	Name	Thai
1.	Ban Khlong Kluea	บ้านคลองเกลือ
2.	Ban Khlong Kluea	บ้านคลองเกลือ
3.	Ban Khlong Kluea	บ้านคลองเกลือ
4.	Ban Khlong Kluea	บ้านคลองเกลือ

=== Local administration ===
The whole area of the subdistrict is covered by Pak Kret City Municipality (เทศบาลนครปากเกร็ด).
