= Khlong Phra Udom subdistrict, Nonthaburi =

Khlong Phra Udom Subdistrict ตำบลคลองพระอุดม
- Subdistrict
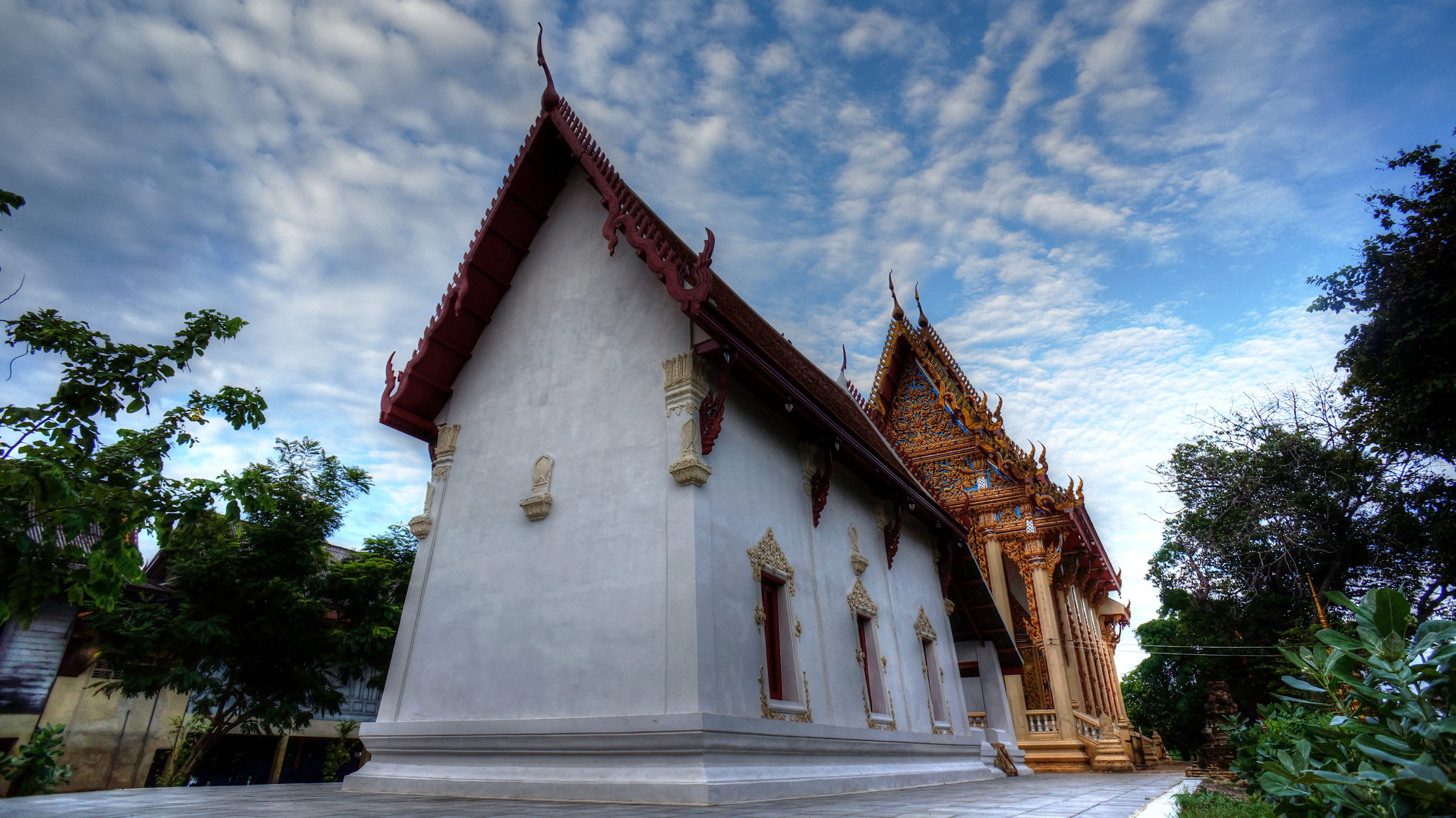
- Wat Thong Khung, one of the six Buddhist temples in the subdistrict
- Interactive map of Khlong Phra Udom Subdistrict
- Country: Thailand
- Province: Nonthaburi
- District: Pak Kret

Area
  - Total: 5.6 km^{2} (2.2 sq mi)

Population (2020)
  - Total: 6,648
  - Density: 1,187.14/km^{2} (3,074.7/sq mi)
- Time zone: UTC+7 (ICT)
- Postal code: 11120
- TIS 1099: 120606

Khlong Phra Udom (Thai: คลองพระอุดม, pronounced [kʰlɔ̄ːŋ pʰráʔ ʔū.dōm]) is one of the twelve subdistricts (tambon) of Pak Kret District in Nonthaburi Province, Thailand. It is bounded by (clockwise from the north) Khlong Khoi, Bang Tanai, Ko Kret and Bang Phlap subdistricts. In 2020 its population was 6,648.

== Administration ==
=== Central administration ===
The subdistrict is subdivided into 6 administrative villages (muban).

No.	Name	Thai
1.	Ban Wat Bang Chak (Ban Bang Chak)	บ้านวัดบางจาก (บ้านบางจาก)
2.	Ban Lamphu Rai	บ้านลำพูราย
3.	Ban Laem Fang Nuea (Ban Laem Nuea)	บ้านแหลมฝั่งเหนือ (บ้านแหลมเหนือ)
4.	Ban Laem Klang	บ้านแหลมกลาง
5.	Ban Pak Khlong Phra Udom (Ban Pak Khlong)	บ้านปากคลองพระอุดม (บ้านปากคลอง)
6.	Ban Khlong Phra Udom	บ้านคลองพระอุดม

=== Local administration ===
The whole area of the subdistrict is covered by Khlong Phra Udom Subdistrict Administrative Organization (องค์การบริหารส่วนตำบลคลองพระอุดม).
