= Bang Khen (disambiguation) =

Bang Khen District is a district of Bangkok, Thailand.

Bang Khen may also refer to:

- Bang Khen station of the State Railway of Thailand, in Chatuchak District, Bangkok
- Bang Khen Subdistrict in Mueang Nonthaburi District, Nonthaburi Province
- Talat Bang Khen Subdistrict in Lak Si District, Bangkok
