= Bang Khu Wat =

Bang Khu Wat บางคูวัด
- Tambon
- Bang Khu Wat
- Location in Bangkok Metropolitan Region
- Coordinates: 13°57′27.4″N 100°29′24.9″E
- Country: Thailand
- Province: Pathum Thani
- District: Mueang Pathum Thani

Government
  - Type: Town Municipality
  - Mayor: Veera Klamsanong

Area
  - Total: 20.47 km^{2} (7.90 sq mi)

Population (2020)
  - Total: 29,138
  - Density: 1,423.45/km^{2} (3,686.7/sq mi)
- Time zone: UTC+7 (ICT)
- Postcode: 12000
- Area code: (+66) 02
- Geocode: 130107

Bang Khu Wat (Thai: บางคูวัด, pronounced [bāːŋ kʰūː wát]) is a tambon (subdistrict) of Mueang Pathum Thani district, Pathum Thani province, central Thailand.

== History ==
In the past, Bang Khu Wat was an area very famous for Thai sugar cane, a delicacy regional sweets.

There is a rhyming saying of the hawker when selling goods that:

อ้อยจีนบางใหญ่ อ้อยไทยบางคูวัด ข้าวหลามตัดวัดระฆัง ขนมฝรั่งกุฎีจีน แม่เอ๊ย

(literally: Chinese sugar cane of Bang Yai, Thai sugar cane of Bang Khu Wat, Khao lam tat of Wat Rakhang, Khanom farang kudi chin, Oh thou).

== Geography ==
Bang Khu Wat has the southeastern part adjacent to the Chao Phraya River, the opposite side is Pak Kret district, Nonthaburi province. It is about 9 km (5.6 mi) from downtown Pathum Thani.

It is bounded by other administrative areas (from north clockwise): Bang Duea and Bang Khayaeng Subdistrict Municipalities in its district, Pak Kret City Municipality, Bang Tanai and Khlong Khoi Subdistrict Administrative Organizations in Pak Kret District of Nonthaburi Province, with Khlong Phra Udom Subdistrict Municipality in Lat Lum Kaeo district.

== Administration ==
=== Central administration ===
The entire area is under the administration of Bang Khu Wat Town Municipality (เทศบาลเมืองบางคูวัด).

=== Local administration ===
Bang Khu Wat also consists of 12 administrative mubans (villages)

No.	Name	Thai
1.	Ban Plai Bua	บ้านปลายบัว
2.	Ban Khlong Pho	บ้านคลองโพธิ์
3.	Ban Khung Wat	บ้านคุ้งวัด
4.	Ban Khlong Bang Khu Wat	บ้านคลองบางคูวัด
5.	Ban Ko Kriang	บ้านเกาะเกรียง
6.	Ban Bang Tanai	บ้านบางตะไนย์
7.	Ban San Chao	บ้านศาลเจ้า
8.	Ban Phai Lom	บ้านไผ่ล้อม
9.	Ban Tin Len	บ้านตีนเลน
10.	Ban Bang Nang Bun	บ้านบางนางบุญ
11.	Ban Fang Klang	บ้านฝั่งกลาง
12.	Ban Phra Oi	บ้านพระโอย
