= Wat Saeng Siritham =

Buddhist temple in Nonthaburi province, Thailand

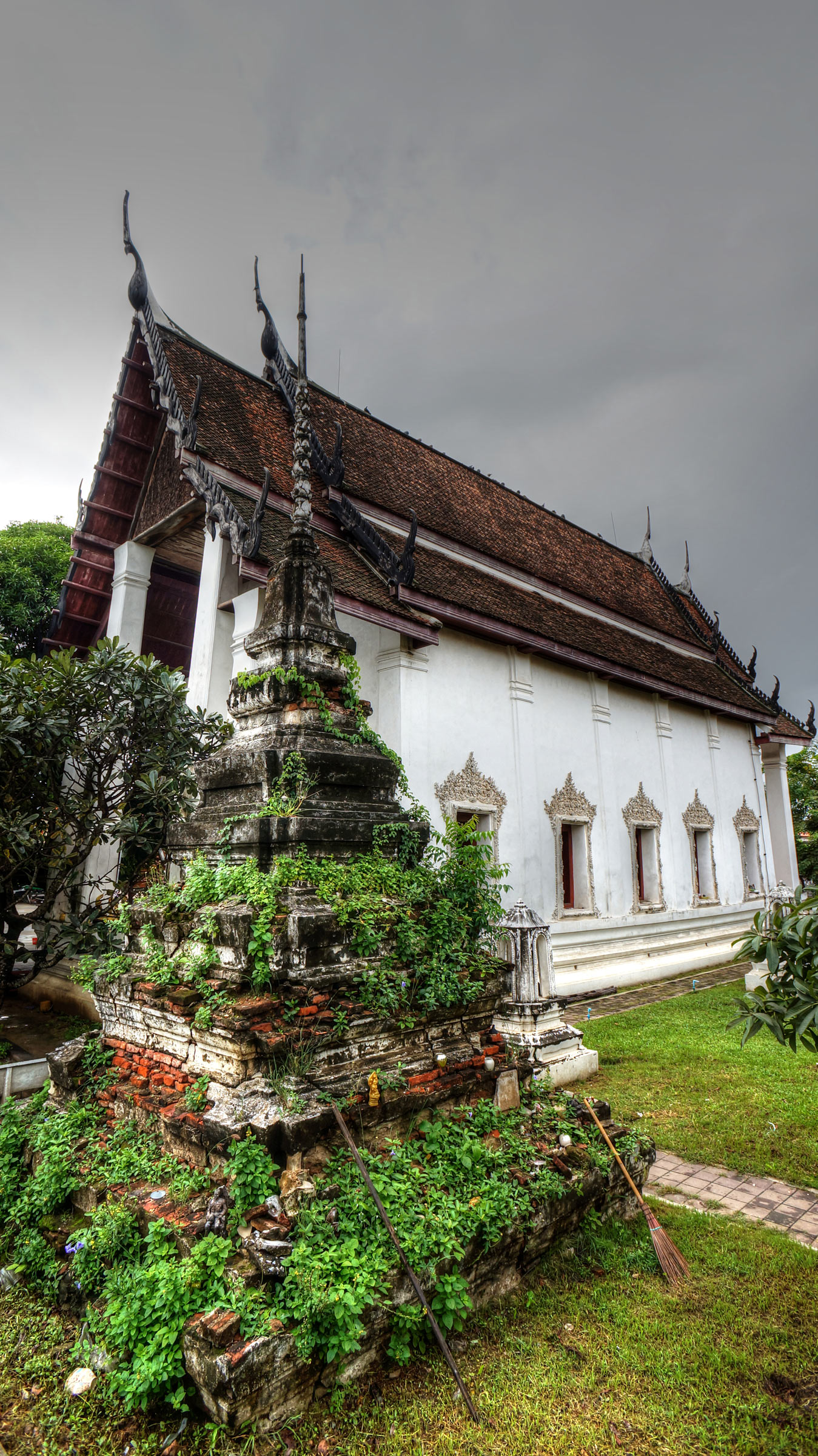
- The old vihāra

- Location within Thailand

Religion
- Affiliation: Buddhism
- Sect: Mahā Nikāya
- Region: Bangkok Metropolitan Region
- Status: private temple

Location
- Location: 1 Moo 5, Tha It subdistrict, Pak Kret district, Nonthaburi province
- Country: Thailand
- Interactive map of Wat Saeng Siritham
- Coordinates: 13.9021°N 100.4719°E

Wat Saeng Siritham (Thai: วัดแสงสิริธรรม) is an ancient Thai Buddhist temple in Tha It subdistrict, Pak Kret district, Nonthaburi province, Bangkok Metropolitan Region.

Formerly known as "Wat Khwit" (วัดขวิด), this temple was built in the late Ayutthaya period. When Burmese occupied Nonthaburi in 1765 (two years before the fall of Ayutthaya), the temple was deserted.

Later in the early Rattanakosin period the locals joined to renovate the temple in the year 1784 and received a major renovation in the year 1845 during the King Nangklao (Rama III)'s reign by a wealthy Chinese named Niam (เจ้าสัวเนียม), who was an owner of local brick factory.

There are two principal Buddha images in Māravijaya posture namely Luang Pho To (หลวงพ่อโต) and Luang Pho Dam (หลวงพ่อดำ) enshrined in the old vihāra (sanctuary).

Wat Saeng Siritham is located along the Chao Phraya River, therefore making the pier of the temple look like a floating market. It is a project aimed for promoting local producers around the temple and on Ko Kret, a nearby tourist attraction.

== Gallery ==
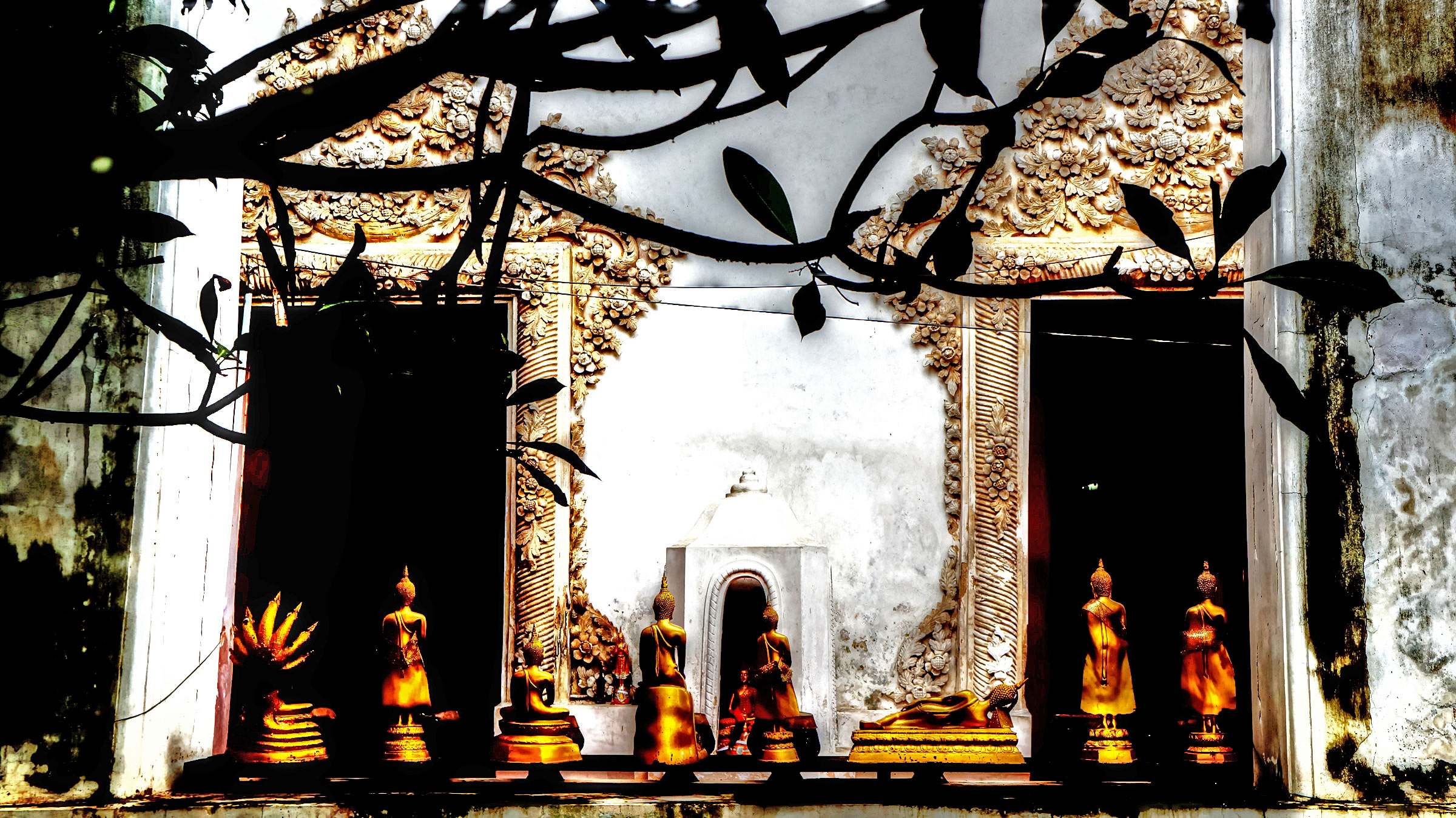
Doors of the old vihāra

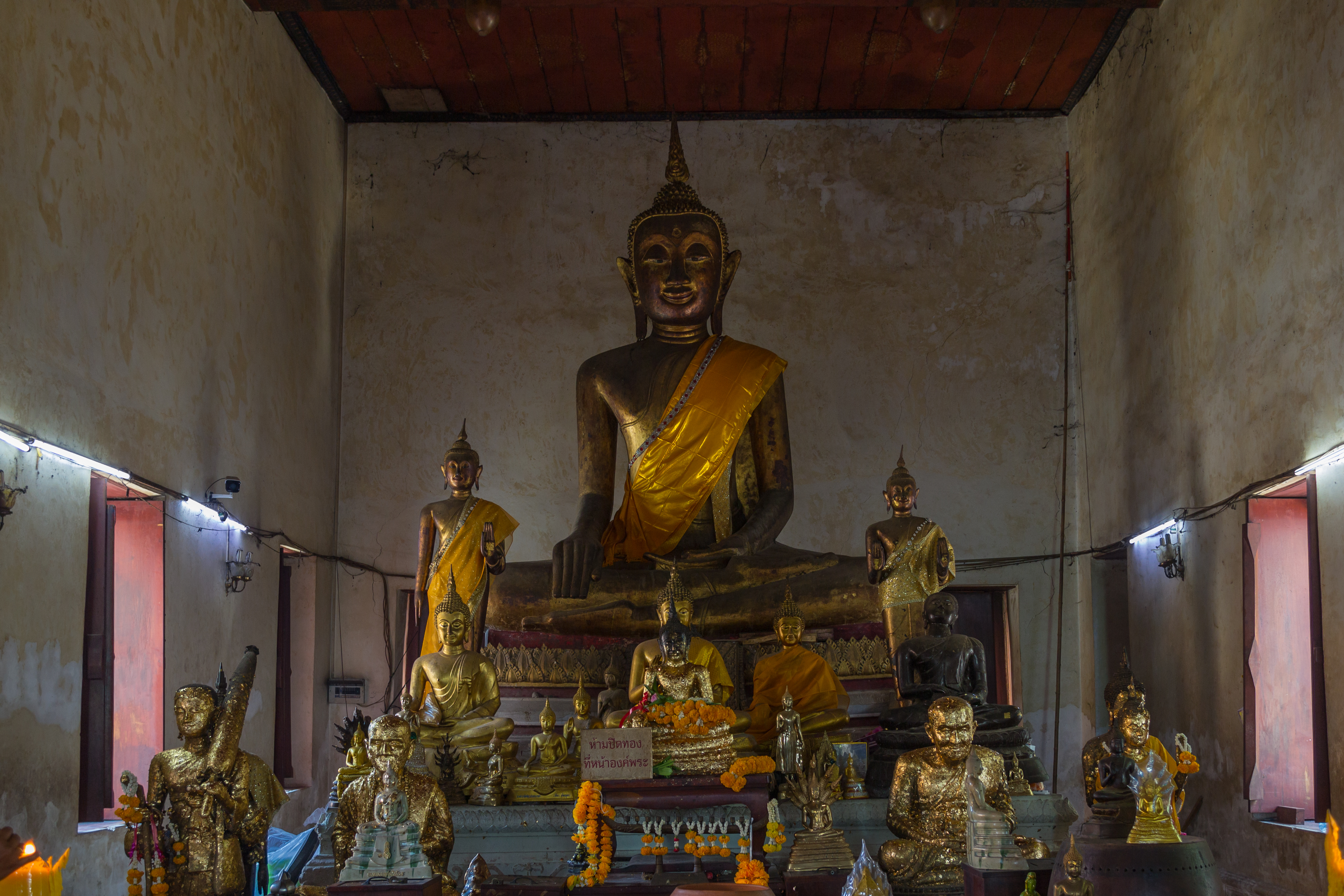
Luang Pho Dam
