= Om Kret =

Om Kret Subdistrict ตำบลอ้อมเกร็ด
- Subdistrict
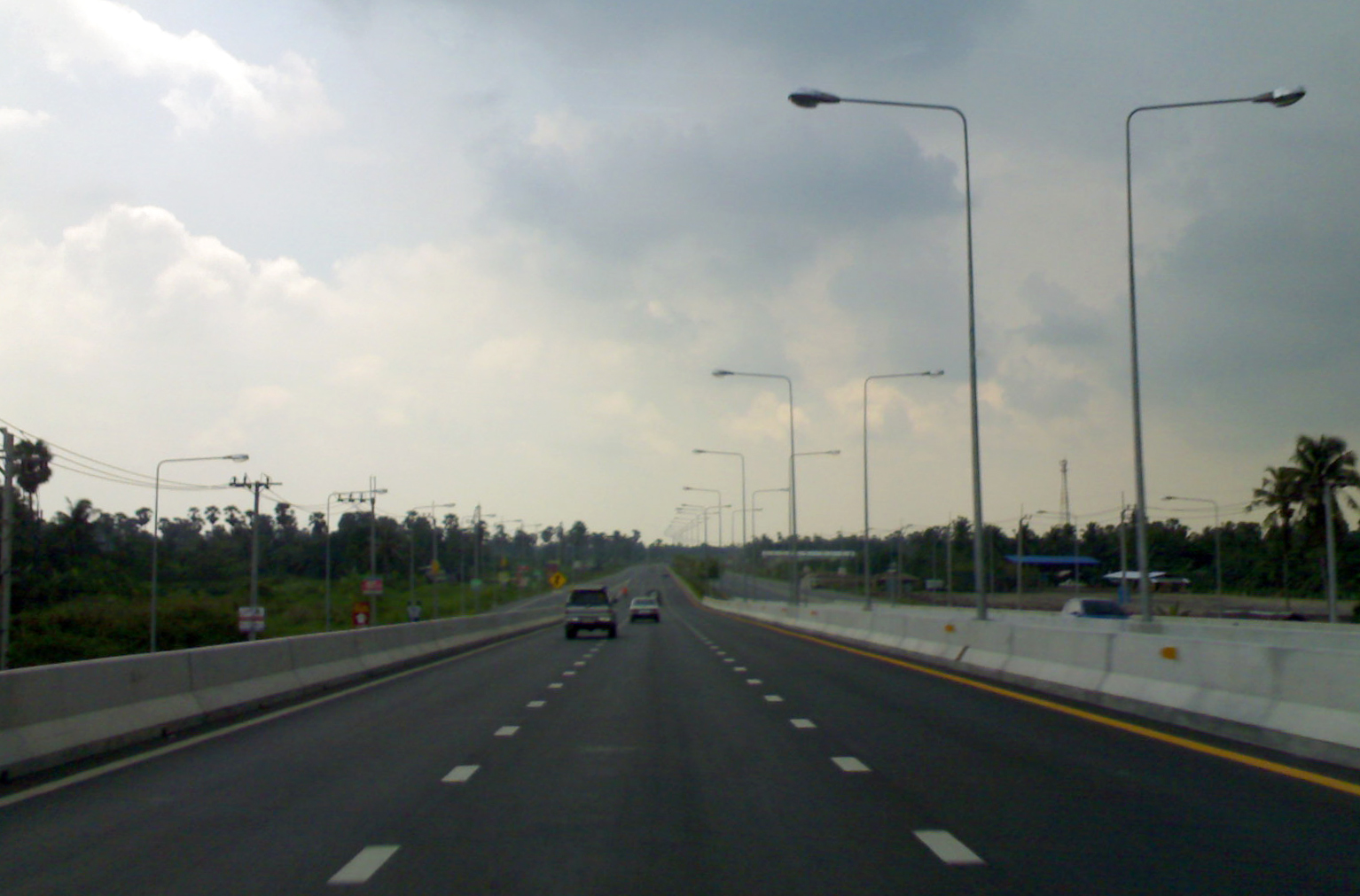
- Ratchaphruek Road in the subdistrict

- Location within Bangkok Location within Thailand
- Country: Thailand
- Province: Nonthaburi
- District: Pak Kret

Area
  - Total: 3.97 km^{2} (1.53 sq mi)

Population (2020)
  - Total: 4,829
  - Density: 1,216.37/km^{2} (3,150.4/sq mi)
- Time zone: UTC+7 (ICT)
- Postal code: 11120
- TIS 1099: 120609

Om Kret (Thai: อ้อมเกร็ด, pronounced [ʔɔ̂ːm krèt]) is one of the twelve subdistricts (tambon) of Pak Kret District, in Nonthaburi Province, Thailand. The subdistrict is bounded by (clockwise from north) Bang Phlap, Ko Kret, Tha It, Bang Rak Noi, Bang Rak Phatthana and Phimon Rat subdistricts. In 2020 it had a total population of 4,829 people.

== Administration ==
=== Central administration ===
The subdistrict is subdivided into 6 administrative villages (muban).

No.	Name	Thai
1.	Ban Tha Lan	บ้านท่าลาน
2.	Ban Wat Sing Thong (Ban Khlong Bang Bua Thong)	บ้านวัดสิงห์ทอง (บ้านคลองบางบัวทอง)
3.	Ban Khlong Bang Pakun (Ban Khlong Bang Na)	บ้านคลองบางปะกุน (บ้านคลองบางนา)
4.	Ban Khong Takhian (Ban Khlong Yai Chan)	บ้านคลองตะเคียน (บ้านคลองยายจัน)
5.	Ban Khlong Ban Kao	บ้านคลองบ้านเก่า
6.	Ban Khlong Bang Noi	บ้านคลองบางน้อย

=== Local administration ===
The whole area of the subdistrict is covered by Om Kret Subdistrict Administrative Organization (องค์การบริหารส่วนตำบลอ้อมเกร็ด).
