= Ban Mai, Pak Kret =

Ban Mai Subdistrict ตำบลบ้านใหม่
- Subdistrict
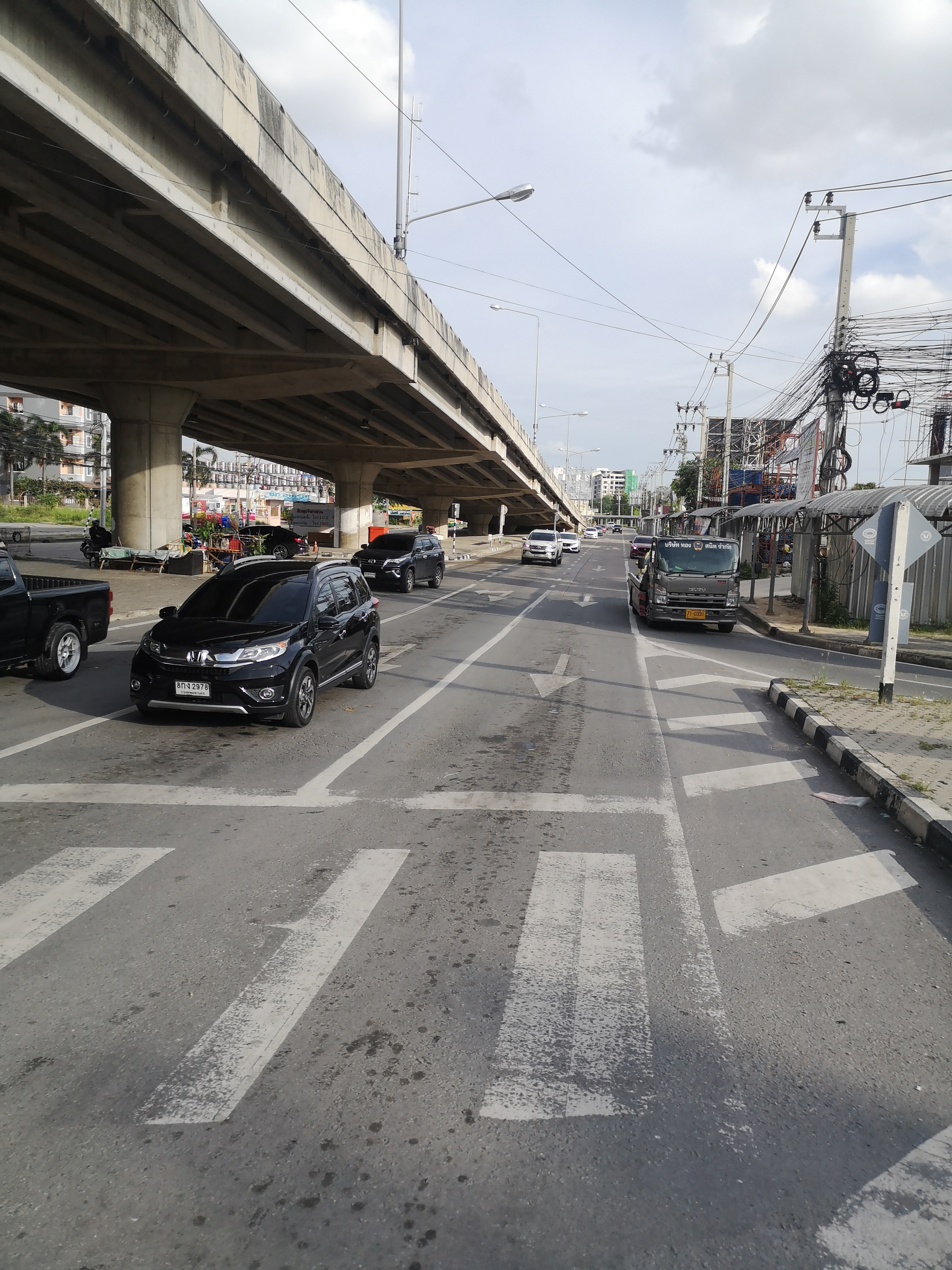
- Si Saman Road in the subdistrict
- Country: Thailand
- Province: Nonthaburi
- District: Pak Kret

Population (2020)
  - Total: 33,642
- Time zone: UTC+7 (ICT)
- Postal code: 11120
- TIS 1099: 120603

Ban Mai (Thai: บ้านใหม่, pronounced [bâːn màj]) is one of the twelve subdistricts (tambon) of Pak Kret District, in Nonthaburi Province, Thailand. Neighbouring subdistricts are (from north clockwise) Bang Khayaeng, Ban Mai (Pathum Thani Province), Si Kan, Don Mueang, Thung Song Hong, Khlong Kluea and Bang Phut. In 2020, it had a total population of 33,642 people.

== Administration ==
=== Central administration ===
The subdistrict is subdivided into 6 villages (muban).

No.	Name	Thai
1.	Ban Mai	บ้านใหม่
2.	Ban Mai	บ้านใหม่
3.	Ban Dap	บ้านดาบ
4.	Ban Khlong Wat Chong Lom (Ban Chong Lom)	บ้านคลองวัดช่องลม (บ้านช่องลม)
5.	Ban Don Koeng	บ้านดอนเกิง
6.	Ban Nong Bon	บ้านหนองบอน

=== Local administration ===
The whole area of the subdistrict is covered by Pak Kret City Municipality (เทศบาลนครปากเกร็ด).
