= Wat Paramaiyikawat =

Buddhist temple in Nonthaburi province, Thailand

Coordinates: 13°54′45.55″N 100°29′22.88″E

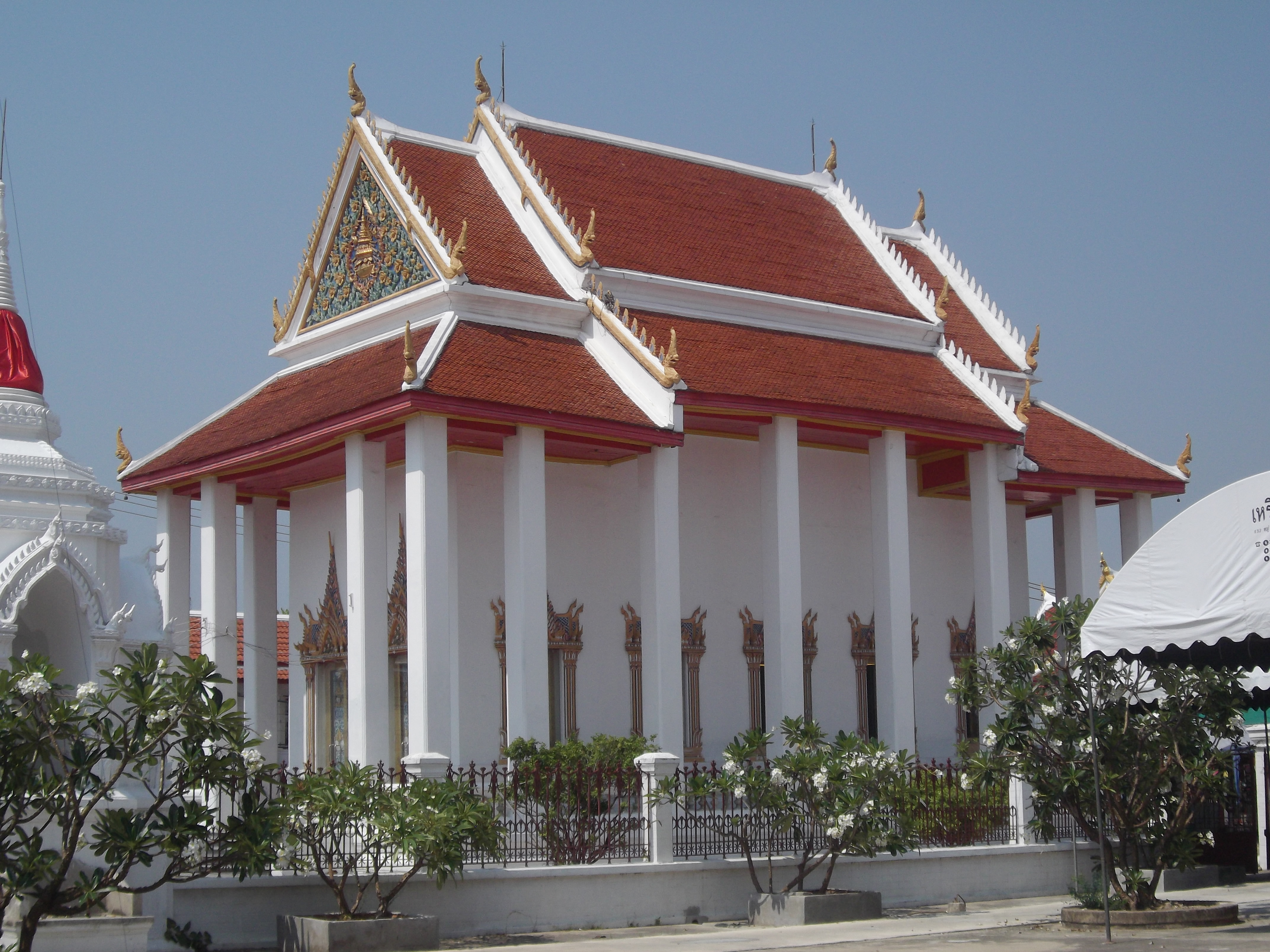
- Ordination hall of temple

- Location within Thailand

Religion
- Affiliation: Buddhism
- Sect: Theravāda, Mahā Nikāya
- Region: central Thailand

Location
- Location: 51 Moo 7, Ko Kret, Pak Kret, Nonthaburi
- Country: Thailand

Architecture
- Founder: Mon people

Wat Paramaiyikawat Warawihan (Thai: วัดปรมัยยิกาวาส วรวิหาร) or simply known as Wat Paramaiyikawat (วัดปรมัยยิกาวาส) is an ancient Buddhist temple located on Ko Kret, Nonthaburi Province, central Thailand on the Chao Phraya River.

The temple is classified as the second rank of royal temple. It is believed that it was built in the late Ayutthaya period after begin of Ko Kret. At that time it was called "Wat Pak Ao" (วัดปากอ่าว), which means "estuary temple" according to the location.

In 1764, when the Burmese occupied the city during the fall of Ayutthaya, the temple was left empty, until 1774 when the Mons immigrated in the reign of King Taksin who ordered to restore the temple, which Mons call "Pia Moo Kia Terng" (เภี่ยมู้เกี้ยเติ้ง, Mon: ဘာမုဟ်ဂဒုင်), meaning "temple at the cape". In 1874, King Chulalongkorn (Rama V) presided over the Thot Kathin (ทอดกฐิน) ceremony in total four Mon's temples of Nonthaburi. The King ordered the restoration and overhaul of the temple by preserving the Mon style in order to devote the merit to his grandmother (Princess Sudarattanarachaprayur) who had raised him when he was young and named the temple "Wat Paramaiyikawat" like today, which means "temple of grandmother".

Interior ordinational hall features mural paintings in applied Thai traditional style and the doors with windows are decorated in coloured stucco style. Outside the temple at the rightmost of the island corner is the location of the "Phra Chedi Mutao" (พระเจดีย์มุเตา), a white pagoda in Mon style. King Chulalongkorn once was here to pour relics of Buddha inside in 1884. This pagoda has a distinctive leaning pagoda.

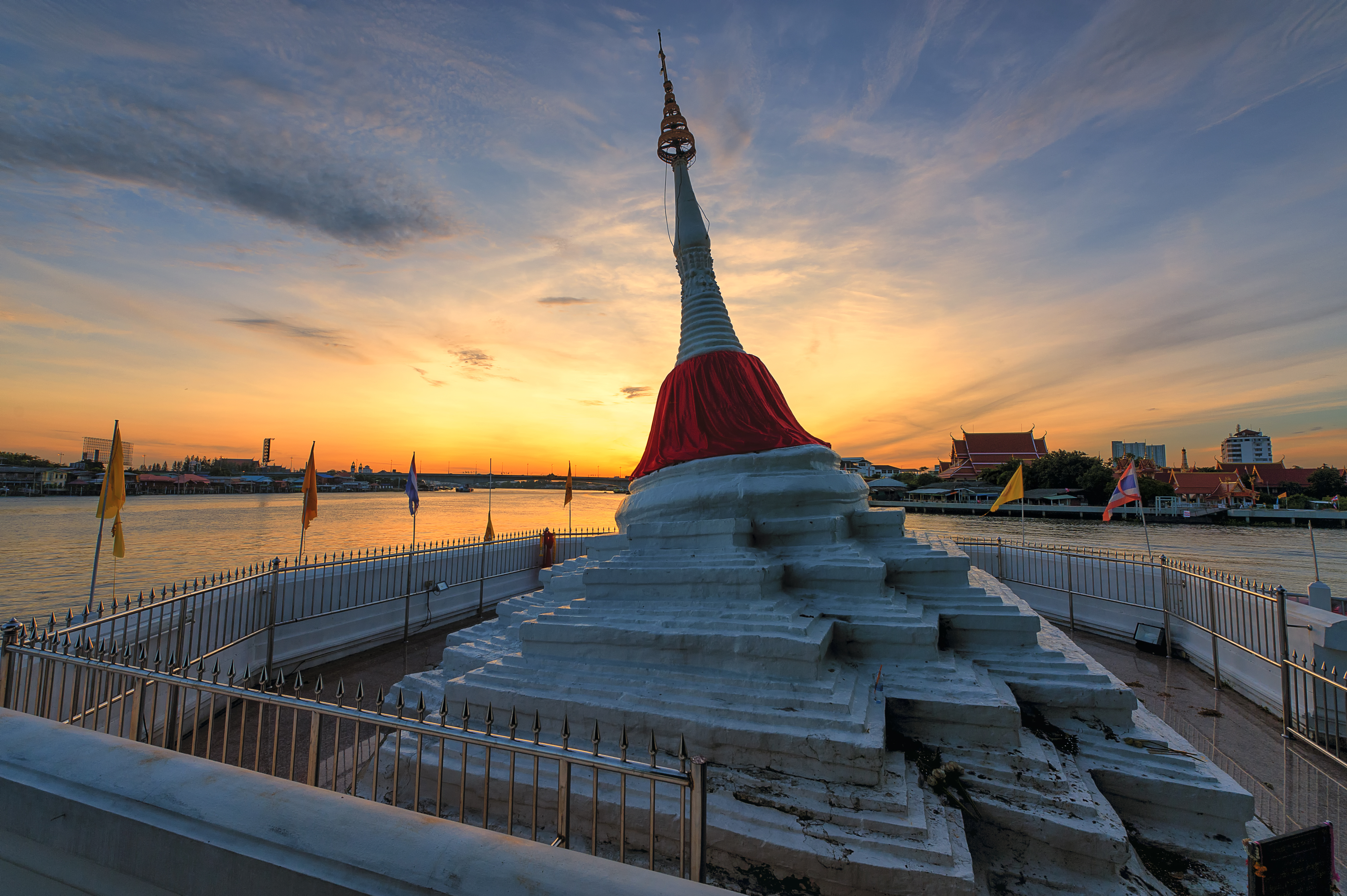
The leaning Mon pagoda in Pak Kret, on the Chao Phraya River

Originally, it was an upright pagoda. Water eroded the bank therefore causing the pagoda to tilt about the year 1891.Efforts to restore it in 1992 were unsuccessful. The pagoda is replica of the Shwemawdaw Pagoda of Bago, Myanmar which is a pagoda that is worshiped and highly respected by the Mons.

Presently, the leaning pagoda regarded as the symbol and landmark of Ko Kret. It is very beautiful when viewed from the midstream or from a boat that passes through because its location is the confluence of waterways Chao Phraya and Lat-Kret with Om-Kret. Both the pagoda and temple has been registered as national ancient monuments by the Fine Arts Department since 1935.

Wat Paramaiyikawat also regarded as the gateway of Ko Kret because it has a ferry pier opposite the mainland of Nonthaburi (Pak Kret) which is a very popular route.
