= Bang Phlap, Nonthaburi =

Bang Phlap Subdistrict ตำบลบางพลับ
- Subdistrict
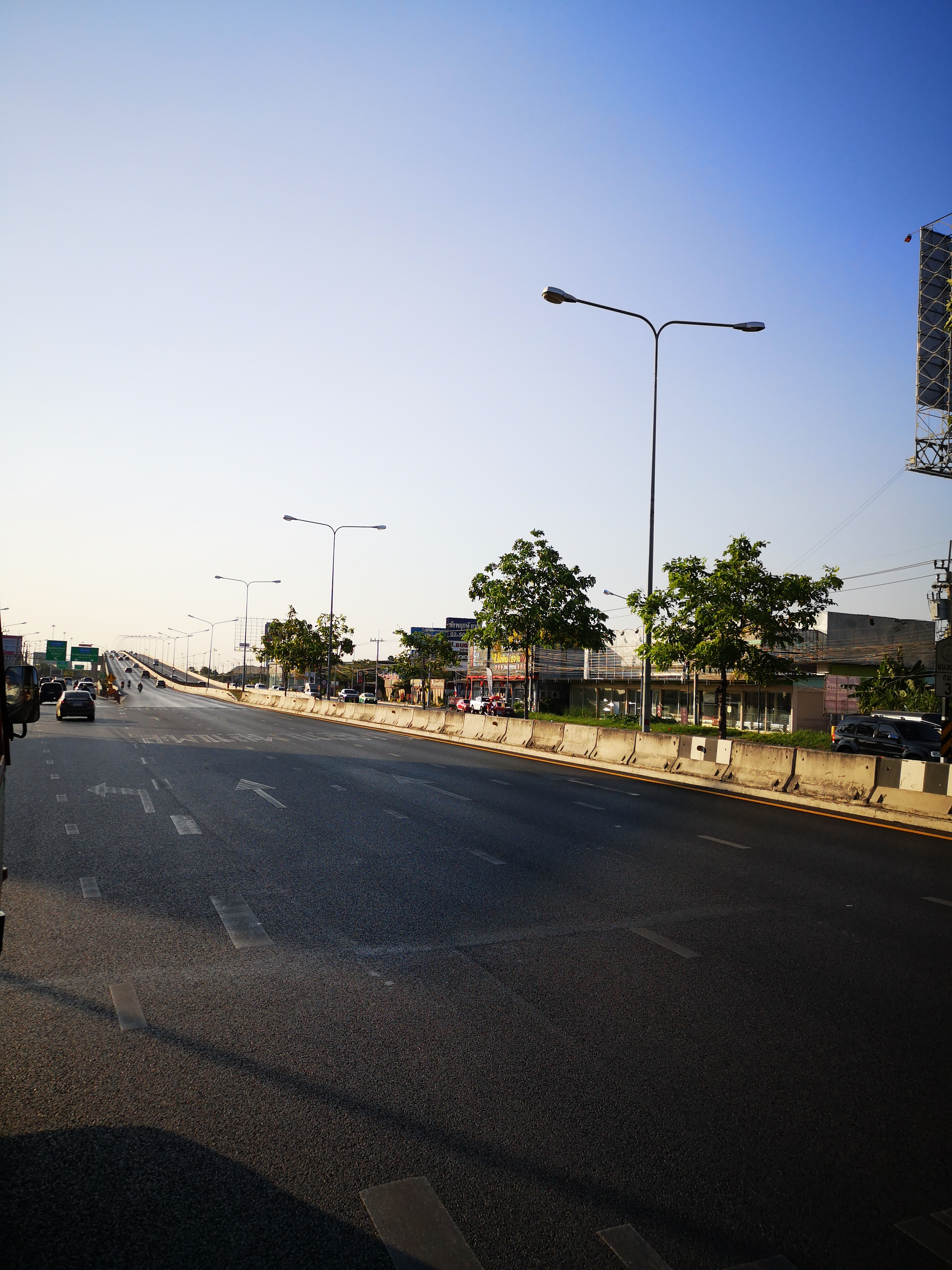
- Chaiyaphruek Road in the subdistrict
- Interactive map of Bang Phlap Subdistrict
- Country: Thailand
- Province: Nonthaburi
- District: Pak Kret

Area
  - Total: 8.31 km^{2} (3.21 sq mi)

Population (2020)
  - Total: 10,899
  - Density: 1,311.55/km^{2} (3,396.9/sq mi)
- Time zone: UTC+7 (ICT)
- Postal code: 11120
- TIS 1099: 120611

Bang Phlap (Thai: บางพลับ, pronounced [bāːŋ pʰláp]) is one of the twelve subdistricts (tambon) of Pak Kret District, in Nonthaburi Province, Thailand. Neighbouring subdistricts are (from north clockwise) Lahan, Khlong Khoi, Khlong Phra Udom, Ko Kret, Om Kret and Phimon Rat. In 2020, it had a total population of 10,899 people.

== Administration ==
=== Central administration ===
The subdistrict is subdivided into 5 administrative villages (muban).

No.	Name	Thai
1.	Ban Khung Nam Won	บ้านคุ้งน้ำวน
2.	Ban Bang Phlap Yai (Ban Bang Phlap)	บ้านบางพลับใหญ่ (บ้านบางพลับ)
3.	Ban Rahaeng	บ้านระแหง
4.	Ban Bang Phlap (Ban Bang Wat)	บ้านบางพลับ (บ้านบางวัด)
5.	Ban Bang Phum	บ้านบางภูมิ

=== Local administration ===
The whole area of the subdistrict is covered by Bang Phlap Subdistrict Municipality (เทศบาลตำบลบางพลับ).
