= Khlong Khoi subdistrict, Nonthaburi =

Khlong Khoi Subdistrict ตำบลคลองข่อย
- Subdistrict
- Location within Thailand
- Country: Thailand
- Province: Nonthaburi
- District: Pak Kret

Area
  - Total: 17.085 km^{2} (6.597 sq mi)

Population (2020)
  - Total: 8,383
  - Density: 490.66/km^{2} (1,270.8/sq mi)
- Time zone: UTC+7 (ICT)
- Postal code: 11120
- TIS 1099: 120610

Khlong Khoi (Thai: คลองข่อย, pronounced [kʰlɔ̄ːŋ kʰɔ̀j]) is one of the twelve subdistricts (tambon) of Pak Kret District, in Nonthaburi Province, Thailand. Neighbouring subdistricts are (from north clockwise) Lat Lum Kaeo, Khlong Phra Udom (Pathum Thani Province), Bang Khu Wat, Bang Tanai, Khlong Phra Udom (Nonthaburi Province), Bang Phlap, Lahan, Lam Pho, Lahan and Namai. In 2020 it had a total population of 8,383 people.

== Administration ==
=== Central administration ===
The subdistrict is subdivided into 12 administrative villages (muban).

No.	Name	Thai
1.	Ban Don Tan	บ้านดงตาล
2.	Ban Khlong Sai	บ้านคลองไทร
3.	Ban Khlong Khoi	บ้านคลองข่อย
4.	Ban Khlong Bang Phum	บ้านคลองบางภูมิ
5.	Ban Dong Kha	บ้านดงข่า
6.	Ban Khu Wang Daeng	บ้านคูวังแดง
7.	Ban Lam Lat Sawai (Ban Lat Sawai)	บ้านลำลาดสวาย (บ้านลาดสวาย)
8.	Ban Pratu Nam Phra Udom	บ้านประตูน้ำพระอุดม
9.	Ban Khlong Khut	บ้านคลองขุด
10.	Ban Nong Klam (Ban Khlong Trong)	บ้านหนองกล่ำ (บ้านคลองตรง)
11.	Ban Sam Wa	บ้านสามวา
12.	Ban Lam Pho	บ้านลำโพ

=== Local administration ===
The whole area of the subdistrict is covered by Khlong Khoi Subdistrict Administrative Organization (องค์การบริหารส่วนตำบลคลองข่อย).
