= Chaeng Watthana - Pak Kret 28 MRT station =

Railway station in Nonthaburi, Thailand

Chaeng Watthana - Pak Kret 28 แจ้งวัฒนะ - ปากเกร็ด 28
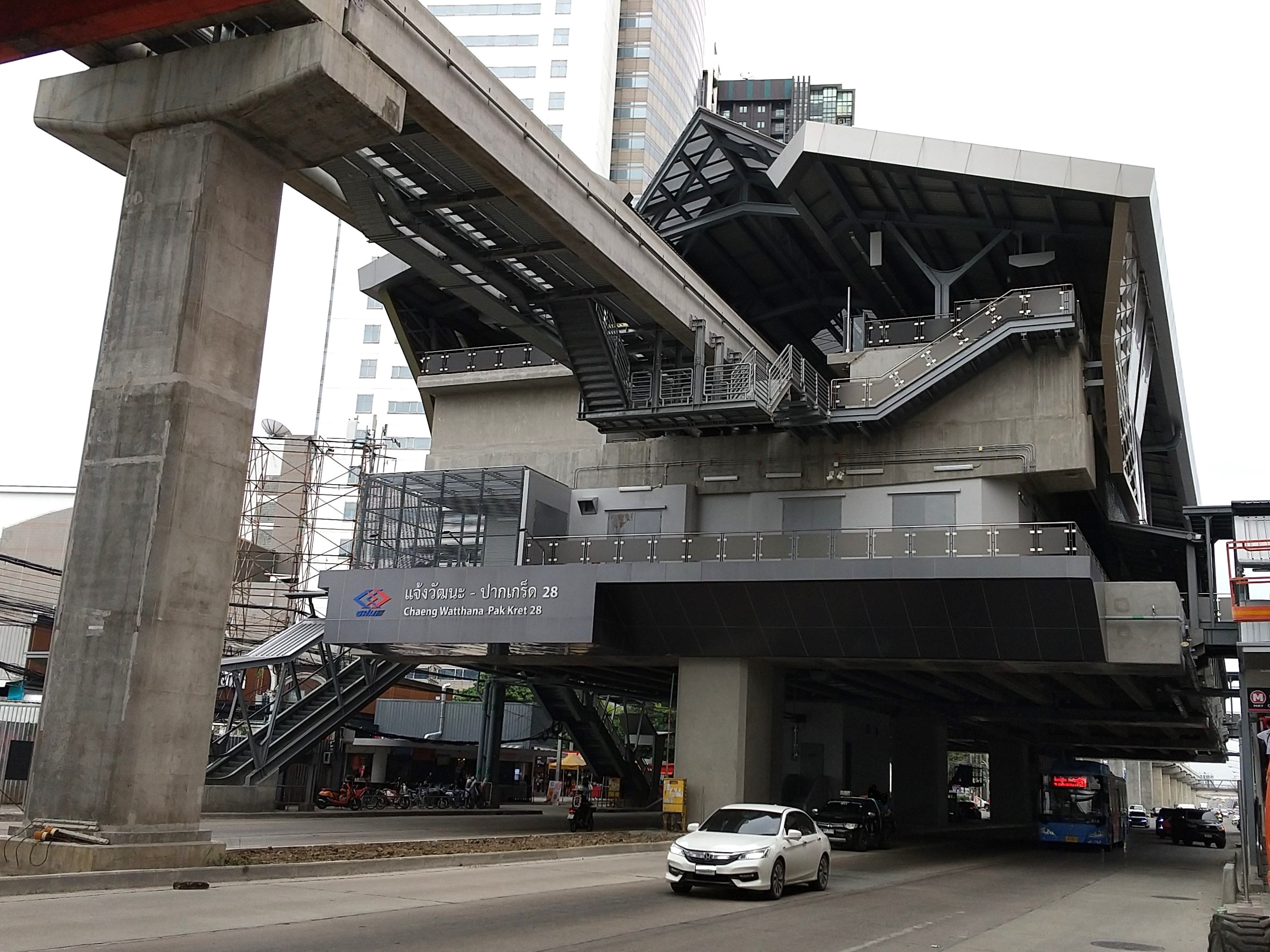

General information
- Location: Pak Kret District, Nonthaburi province, Thailand
- Coordinates: 13.9042°N 100.5292°E
- System: MRT
- Owner: Mass Rapid Transit Authority of Thailand (MRTA)
- Operator: Northern Bangkok Monorail Company Limited
- Line: Pink Line

Other information
- Station code: PK08

History
- Opened: 21 November 2023

Services
Preceding station	Metropolitan Rapid Transit	Following station
Pak Kret Bypass towards Nonthaburi Civic Center	Pink Line	Si Rat towards Min Buri
Location

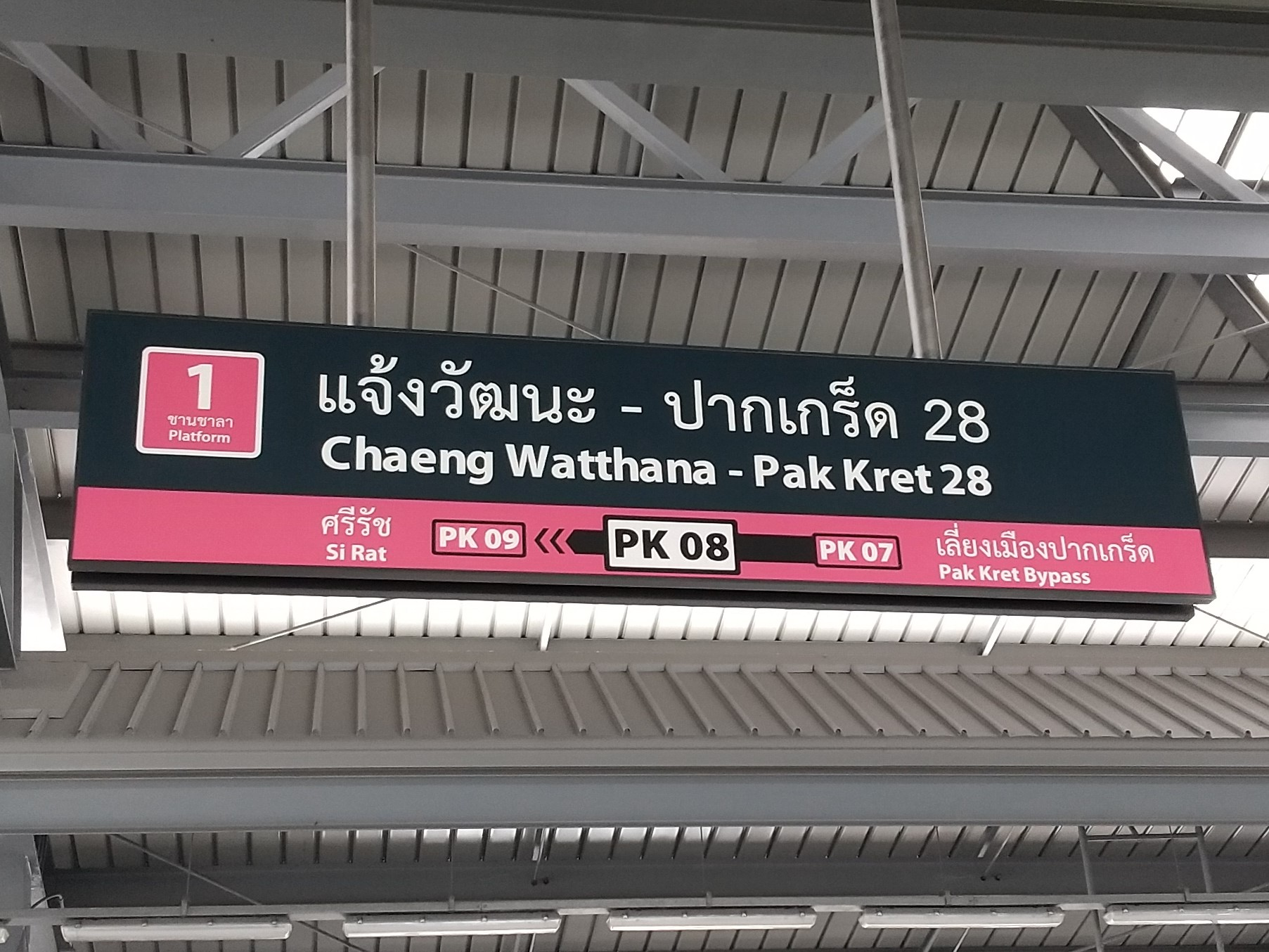
Signage

Chaeng Watthana - Pak Kret 28 station (Thai: สถานีแจ้งวัฒนะ - ปากเกร็ด 28) is a Bangkok MRT station on the Pink Line. The station is located on Chaeng Watthana Road in Pak Kret district, Nonthaburi province. The station has four exits, one of which is in front of Central Chaengwattana shopping mall. It opened on 21 November 2023 as part of trial operations on the entire Pink Line.
