= Central Chaengwattana =

Shopping mall in Nonthaburi, Thailand

Central Chaengwattana เซ็นทรัล แจ้งวัฒนะ
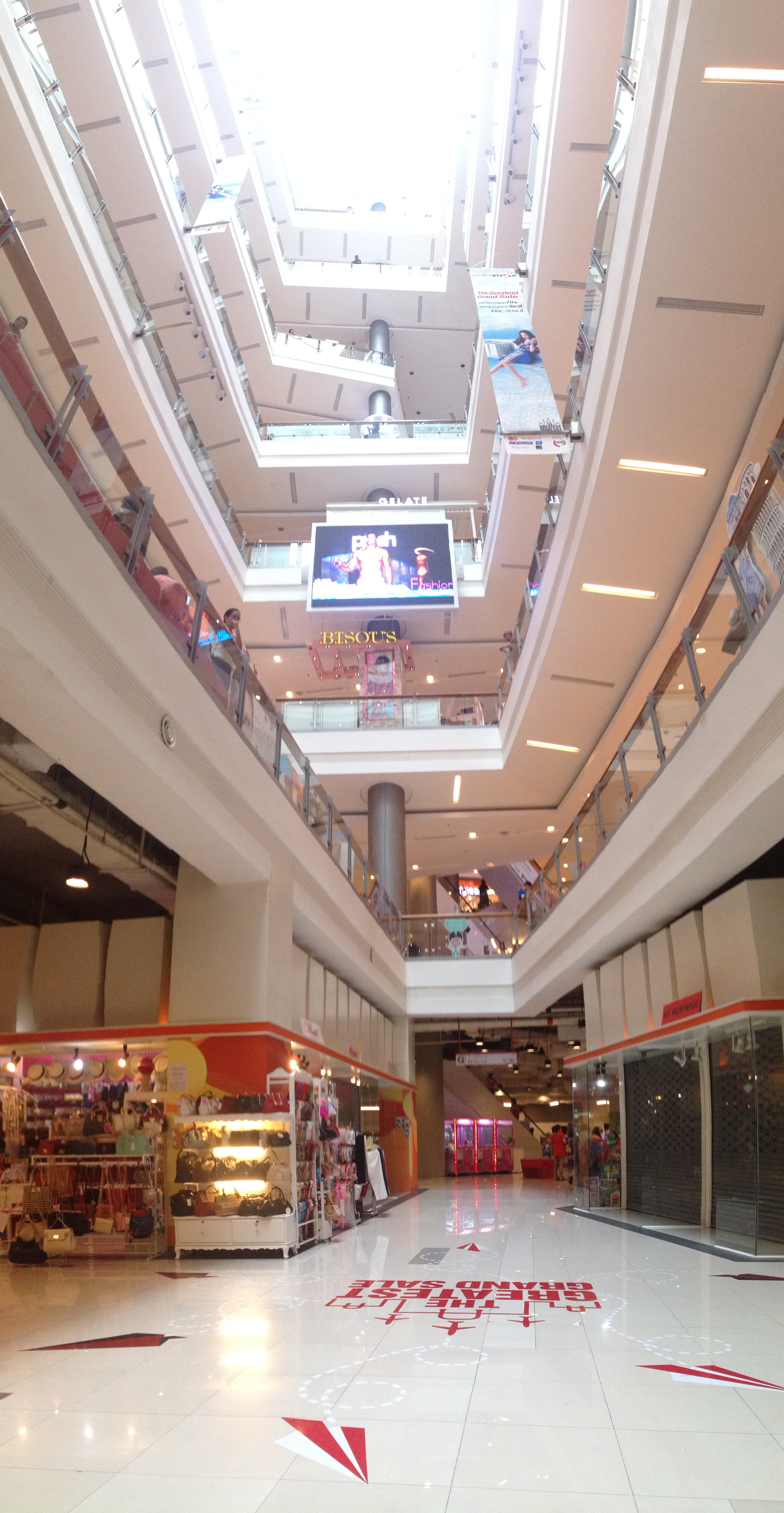
- Central Chaengwattana
- Location: Pak Kret, Nonthaburi 11120, Thailand
- Coordinates: 13°54′13″N 100°31′41″E
- Address: 99,99/9, Mu 2, Chaeng Watthana Rd., Bang Talat
- Opened: November 27, 2008
- Developer: Central Pattana
- Manager: Wiwat Charoensawatpong
- Owner: Central Pattana
- Num. of stores: 385
- Floor area: 65,550 m^{2} (705,600 sq ft)
- Floors: 7
- Parking: 3,234
- Website: www.centralplaza.co.th

Central Chaengwattana (Thai: เซ็นทรัล แจ้งวัฒนะ), previously known as CentralPlaza Chaengwattana, is a shopping mall located on Chaeng Watthana Road, Pak Kret District, Nonthaburi in the Bangkok Metropolitan Area. It was opened in 2008 and is the first shopping mall of Central Group in Nonthaburi province. It is served by Chaeng Watthana - Pak Kret 28 MRT station of the Pink Line.

== Overview ==
The mall has a total of seven floors with a basement floor included. It is the biggest shopping mall in the northwestern part of Bangkok compromising an area of 24 rai (38,400 m^{2} or 413,000 sq ft). The total size of the shopping mall is some 300,000 m^{2} (3,200,000 sq ft). The mall itself is 208 metres (682 ft) long and 235 metres (771 ft)s wide. The cost of building the mall was 6 billion Baht. It has nine main anchors and more than 300 variety of shops, with well-known brands. Central Chaengwattana has 10 different special zones which are:

- Fashion
- Junction-X
- Sports
- Beauty & Service
- Banking
- Books & Music
- Kids
- Education
- Home Decorative
- IT Center

The operator of the cinema in the mall is SF Cinema. It has over 500 seats and a 28 lane bowling alley locates in SF Strike Bowl with karaoke rooms. Fitness First is also an anchor with an outdoor view. TOPS Supermarket is a supermarket located on the ground floor of the mall. Central Chaengwattana aims to attract 60,000 – 70,000 visitors per day.

== Anchors ==
- Central The Store @ Chaengwattana
- Tops Food Hall
- Central Foodpark
  - Food Park
  - Food Patio
- SFX Cinema 9 Cinemas
- B2S
- Officemate
- Power Buy
- Supersports
- Lopia Japan (First branch in Thailand)
- Fitness First
- Chaengwattana Hall
- Harborland
- Bounce Thailand

== Access ==
The mall along with the office building have a combined parking space for 3,200 cars.

It was served by Chaeng Watthana - Pak Kret 28 MRT station since 21 November 2023.

== See also ==
- List of shopping malls in Thailand
- List of largest shopping malls in Thailand
