= Thung Song Hong station =

Rapid transit station in Lak Si, Thailand

Thung Song Hong ทุ่งสองห้อง
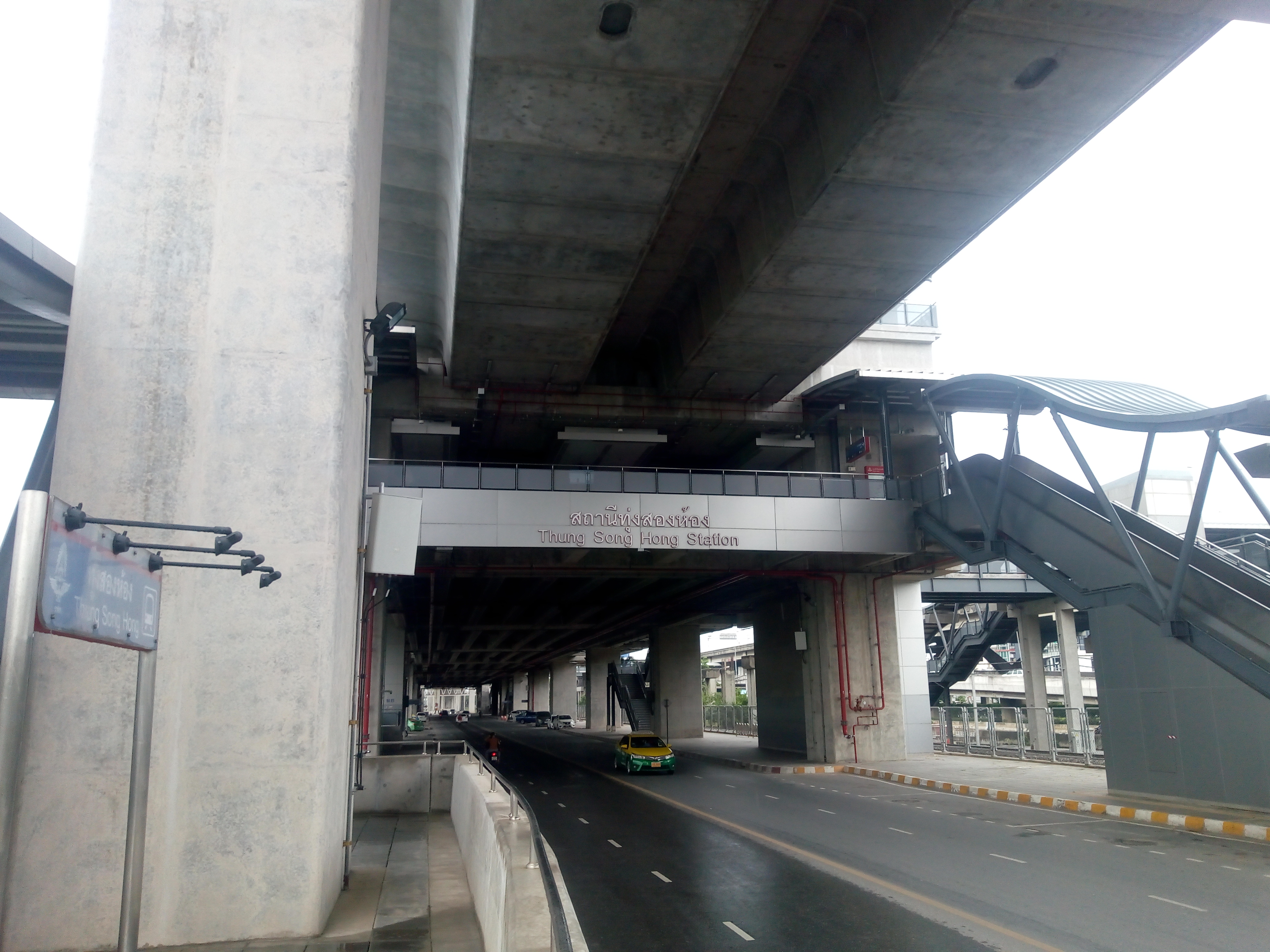

General information
- Location: 106 Kamphaeng Phet 6 Rd, Talat Bang Khen Subdistrict, Lak Si District; Bangkok; Thailand
- Coordinates: 13.8601°N 100.5674°E
- Operator: State Railway of Thailand
- Manager: Ministry of Transport
- Platforms: 2
- Tracks: 4

Construction
- Structure type: Elevated
- Parking: Yes
- Cycle facilities: Yes

Other information
- Station code: RN05

History
- Opened: 2 August 2021; 5 years ago
- Closed: 23 January 2023; 3 years ago (Halt)
- Electrified: 25 kV 50 Hz AC overhead catenary

Services
| Preceding station | SRT Red Lines | Following station |
|---|---|---|
| Bang Khen towards Krung Thep Aphiwat | Dark Red Line | Lak Si towards Rangsit |
Location

Thung Song Hong Station (Thai: สถานีทุ่งสองห้อง) is a railway station in Lak Si District, Bangkok. It serves the SRT Dark Red Line.

== History ==
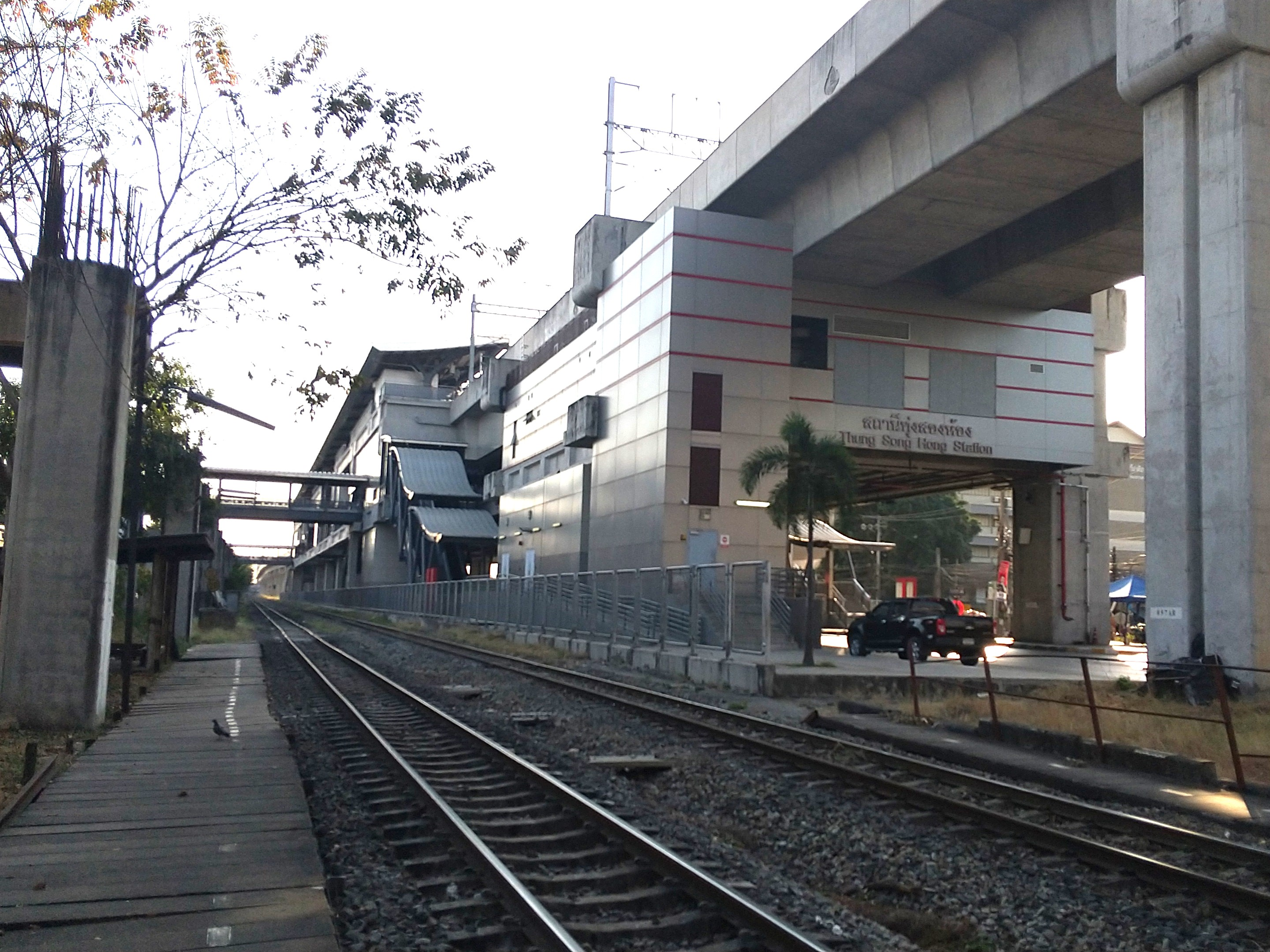
Former ground-level railway halt next to new station

Thung Song Hong was initially a railway halt on the Northern Line and Northeastern Line of the State Railway of Thailand serving commuter trains. A new elevated station was constructed and opened on 2 August 2021 following the opening of the SRT Dark Red Line. Thung Song Hong Halt closed on 19 January 2023 after all services started operating on the elevated tracks.
