= Talat Bang Khen =

Subdistrict in Bangkok, Thailand

Talat Bang Khen ตลาดบางเขน
- Khwaeng
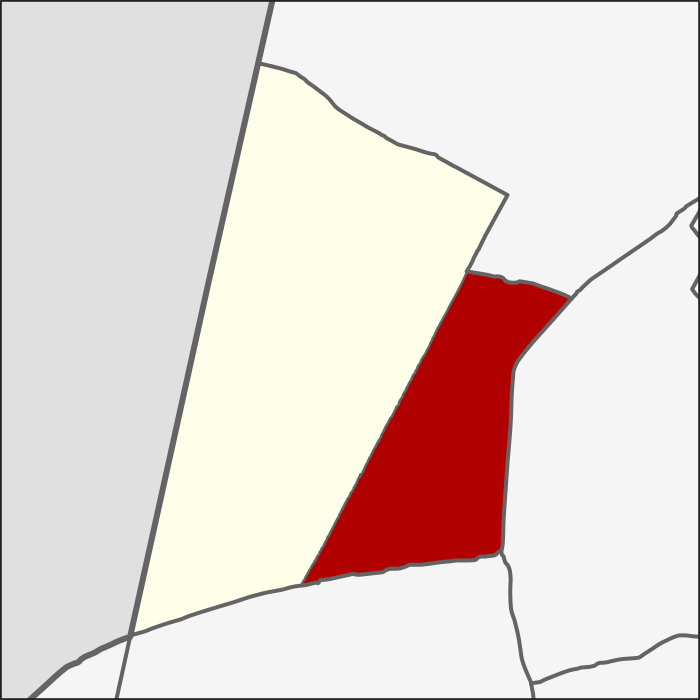
- Location in Lak Si District
- Country: Thailand
- Province: Bangkok
- Khet: Lak Si

Area
  - Total: 5.955 km^{2} (2.299 sq mi)

Population (2020)
  - Total: 27,717
- Time zone: UTC+7 (ICT)
- Postal code: 10210
- TIS 1099: 104102

Talat Bang Khen (Thai: ตลาดบางเขน, pronounced [tā.làːt bāːŋ kʰěːn]) is a subdistrict (Thai: khwaeng) of Lak Si District, in Bangkok, Thailand. In 2020, it had a total population of 27,717 people.
