= Tha It, Nonthaburi =

Tha It Subdistrict ตำบลท่าอิฐ
- Subdistrict
- Location in Thailand
- Country: Thailand
- Province: Nonthaburi
- District: Pak Kret
- Time zone: UTC+7 (ICT)
- Postcode: 11120
- Area code: (+66) 2
- Website: www.thait.go.th

Tha It (Thai: ท่าอิฐ, pronounced [tʰâː ʔìt]) is a tambon (sub-district) in Pak Kret district, Nonthaburi province, outskirts Bangkok.

== History ==
Tha It dates back to the late Ayutthaya period more than 200 years ago. Locals have a career in making bricks from baked clay. Hence, the name Tha It, literally means "brick wharf". There were many wharfs for loading and unloading bricks along the Chao Phraya banks.

In addition, Tha It Muslims are also famous for slaughtering and processing beef with exporting them to various places around the country to become famous local products in present.

In the past, Tha It was also known as a place to plant good-tasting Marian plum.

== Geography ==
Most of the area of Tha It is a lowland alongside the Chao Phraya River and canal Khlong Bang Bua Thong.

Tha It is bounded by other areas (from north clockwise): Om Kret in its district and Khlong Bang Bua Thong, Chao Phraya River, Sai Ma and Bang Rak Noi in Mueang Nonthaburi district, Bang Rak Yai in Bang Bua Thong district, respectively.

== Economy ==
Most Tha It residents work in agriculture, minority are employees.

== Administration ==
Tha It is administered by the Subdistrict Administrative Organization (SAO) Tha It (องค์การบริหารส่วนตำบลท่าอิฐ).

Tha It also consists of 10 administrative villages (muban)

No.	Name	Thai
1.	Ban Khlong Chomphu	บ้านคลองชมพู่
2.	Ban Khan Ruea	บ้านคานเรือ
3.	Ban Khlong Khwang	บ้านคลองขวาง
4.	Ban San Chao Pak Khlong	บ้านศาลเจ้าปากคลอง
5.	Ban Lat Sing	บ้านลาดสิงห์
6.	Ban Surao Suan	บ้านสุเหร่าสวน
7.	Ban Surao Daeng	บ้านสุเหร่าแดง
8.	Ban Hua Toei	บ้านหัวเตย
9.	Ban Lamphu Lai	บ้านลำพูลาย
10.	Ban Surao Yai	บ้านสุเหร่าใหญ่

== Transportation ==
Tha It is easily accessible via Rattanathibet Road (Highway 302). Tha It or Sai Ma Intersection is a main road junction in the area, where Rattanathibet crisscrosses with Ban Sai Ma and Sai Ma–Bang Rak Noi–Tha It Roads.

Tha It is also terminal of some bus lines, for example 18 (Tha It–Victory Monument), 69 (Tha It–Victory Monument), 203 (Tha It–Sanam Luang), etc.

The area is served by the Bang Rak Noi Tha It Station (PP06) of the MRT Metro, whose Purple Line runs above Rattanathibet Road. Tha It can also be reached by Chao Phraya Express Boat from Pak Kret Pier (N33).

== Places ==
- Wat Saeng Siritham
- Tha It Mosque

== Local products ==
- Thai desserts
- Crispy fish chili paste
- Beef products

== Notable people ==
- Thongchai Yenprasert (1955–2026), Thai politician
