= Bang Tanai =

Bang Tanai Subdistrict ตำบลบางตะไนย์
- Subdistrict
- Location in Thailand
- Coordinates: 13°55′10.7″N 100°29′43.08″E
- Country: Thailand
- Province: Nonthaburi
- District: Pak Kret
- Time zone: UTC+7 (ICT)
- Postcode: 11120
- Area code: (+66) 2
- Website: www.bangtanai.go.th

Bang Tanai (Thai: บางตะไนย์, pronounced [bāːŋ tā.nāj]) is one of twelve tambons (sub-districts) of Pak Kret District, Nonthaburi Province in central Thailand.

== History ==
Since the late Ayutthaya period, Bang Tanai was settled by a large number of Mon inhabitants. They inhabit areas along the Chao Phraya River, such as Bang Khu Wat in Pathum Thani Province.

After the fall of Ayutthaya in 1767, the area was abandoned. King Taksin later allowed the Mon people resettle their former villages. In 1822, a large number of Mon immigrants from Burma settled in Siam. King Nangklao (Rama III) allow them to populate Bang Tanai, Bang Phut, and Khlong Ban Laem Yai. They have lived there continuously since then.

The name "Bang Tanai" means "place of toothbrush trees" (Streblus asper), as this plant once flourished along waterways from here to Pathum Thani. Mons call this species of plant khanai (คะไน), which the Thais mispronounced as tanai. Bang is defined by the Royal Institute Dictionary as 'hamlet or community by the waterfront'.

== Geography ==
Bang Tanai has an area of approximately 2,575 rai (4.120 km^{2}; 1.591 sq mi), most of the area consisting of lowlands along the Chao Praya River. It is about 20 km (12 mi) from Pak Kret.

Neighboring tambons are (from the north clockwise): Khlong Khoi and Bang Khu Wat of Pathum Thani Province; Bang Phut and Pak Kret, Ko Kret, and Khlong Phra Udom of Nonthaburi.

== Economy ==
Most Bang Tanai residents work in agriculture.

== Administration ==
Bang Tanai is administered by the Subdistrict Administrative Organization (SAO) Bang Tanai (องค์การบริหารส่วนตำบลบางตะไนย์).

== Local products ==
- Handicrafts
- Herbal products
- Khao mak

== Places of interest ==
- Wat Toei
- Wat Tan
- Wat Tamnak Nuea
