= Lak Si district =

Lak Si หลักสี่
- Khet
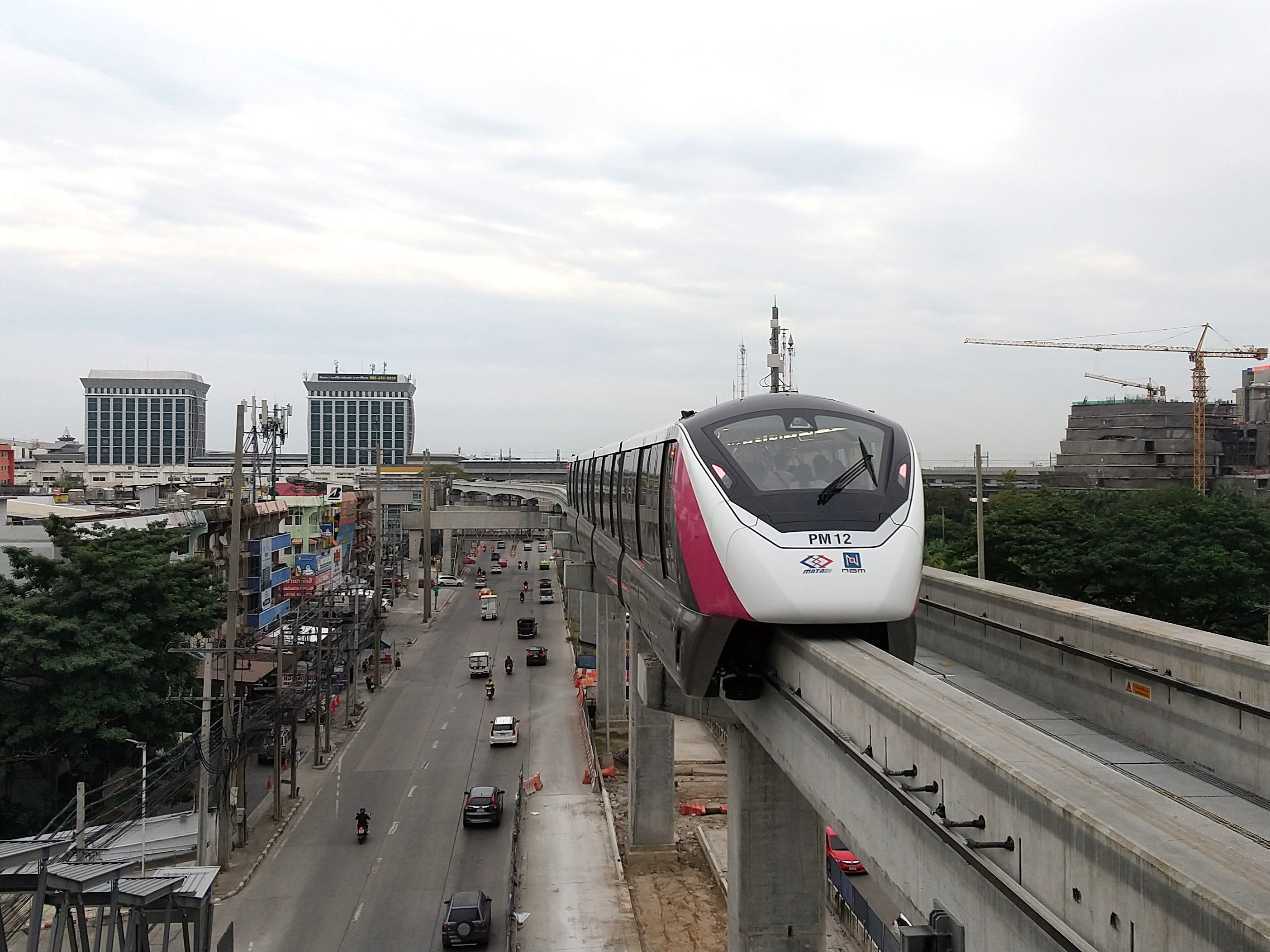
- MRT Pink Line skytrain runs above Chaeng Watthana Road in the Lak Si area

- Khet location in Bangkok
- Coordinates: 13°53′15″N 100°34′44″E
- Country: Thailand
- Province: Bangkok
- Seat: Thung Song Hong
- Khwaeng: 2
- Khet established: 21 November 1997

Area
  - Total: 22.841 km^{2} (8.819 sq mi)

Population (2017)
  - Total: 104,701
  - Density: 4,583.9/km^{2} (11,872/sq mi)
- Time zone: UTC+7 (ICT)
- Postal code: 10210
- Geocode: 1041

Lak Si (Thai: หลักสี่, pronounced [làk sìː]) is one of the 50 districts (khet) of Bangkok, Thailand. It is bounded by (from the north clockwise): Don Mueang, Bang Khen and Chatuchak of Bangkok; Mueang Nonthaburi district and Pak Kret district of Nonthaburi province.

The district is served by SRT Dark Red Line (at Thung Song Hong station, Lak Si station and Kan Kheha station) and MRT Pink Line (at Muang Thong Thani MRT station, Chaeng Watthana 14 MRT station, Government Complex MRT station, National Telecom MRT station, Lak Si station and Rajabhat Phranakhon MRT station)

== History ==
The name Lak Si means 'fourth milestone' referring to the fourth milestone of Khlong Prem Prachakon (คลองเปรมประชากร), a canal dug during King Chulalongkorn's reign linking Bangkok to Bang Pa-in. Lak Si became a district on 21 November 1997, separating from Don Mueang District.

== Administration ==
The district is divided into two sub-districts (khwaeng).

No.	Name	Thai	Area (km^{2})	Map
1.	Thung Song Hong	ทุ่งสองห้อง	16.886	Map
2.	Talat Bang Khen	ตลาดบางเขน	5.955	Map
Total			22.841	Map
