= Thung Song Hong =

Thung Song Hong ทุ่งสองห้อง
- Khwaeng
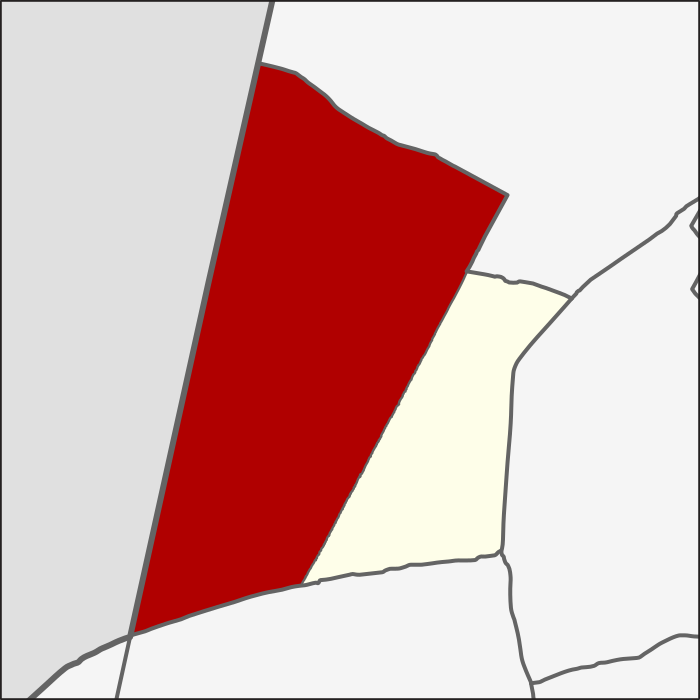
- Location in Lak Si District
- Country: Thailand
- Province: Bangkok
- Khet: Lak Si

Area
  - Total: 16.886 km^{2} (6.520 sq mi)

Population (2020)
  - Total: 74,987
- Time zone: UTC+7 (ICT)
- Postal code: 10210
- TIS 1099: 104101

Thung Song Hong (Thai: ทุ่งสองห้อง, pronounced [tʰûŋ sɔ̌ːŋ hɔ̂ŋ]) is a khwaeng (subdistrict) of Lak Si District, in Bangkok, Thailand. In 2020, it had a total population of 74,987 people.
