= Pak Kret district =

Pak Kret ปากเกร็ด
- District
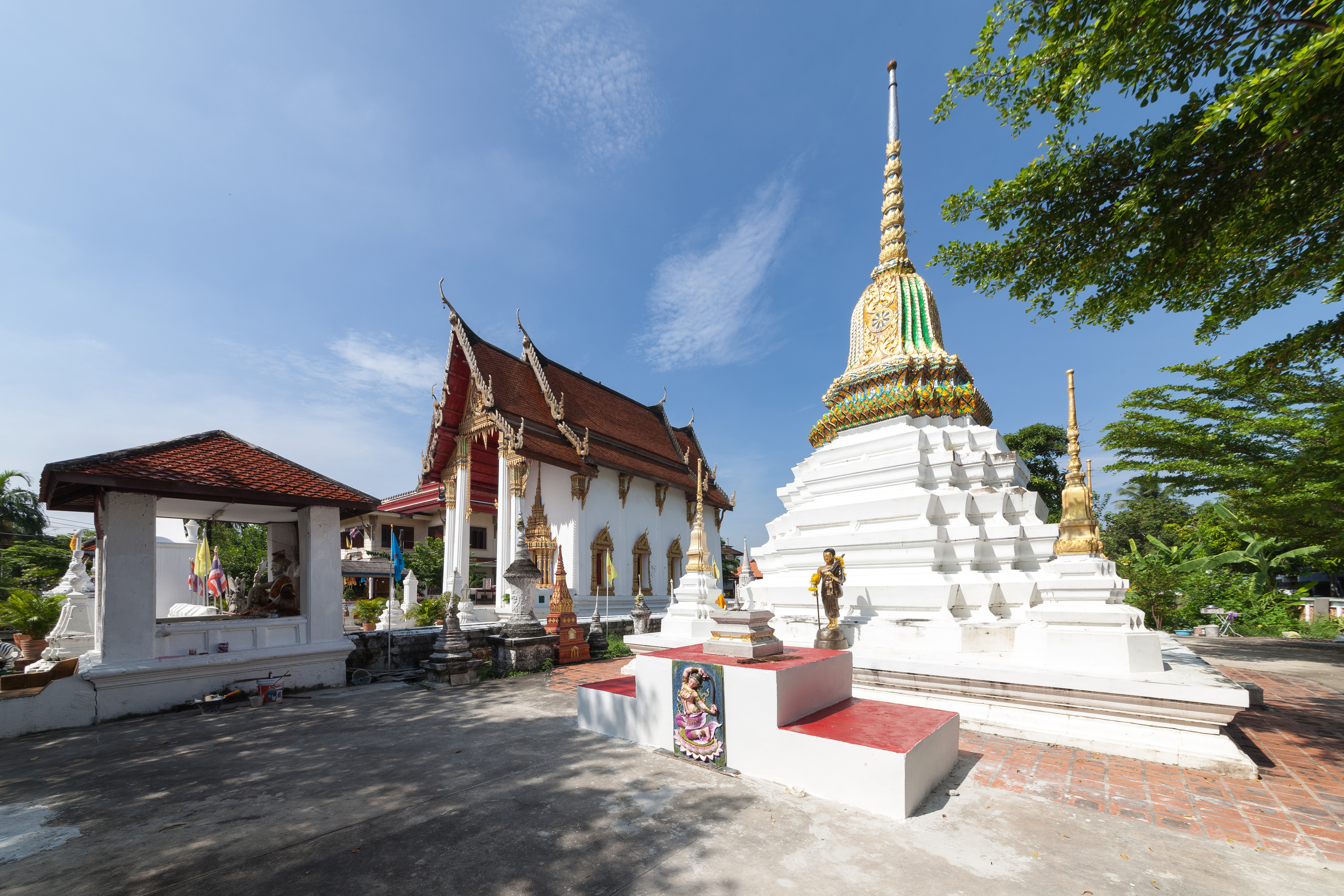
- Wat Chimphli Sutthawat temple
- Interactive map of Pak Kret
- Country: Thailand
- Province: Nonthaburi
- Seat: Pak Kret
- Tambon: 12
- Muban: 85
- District established: 1884

Area
  - Total: 89.0 km^{2} (34.4 sq mi)

Population (2025)
  - Total: 254,616
  - Density: 2,860/km^{2} (7,400/sq mi)
- Time zone: UTC+7 (ICT)
- Postal code: 11120
- Calling code: 02
- ISO 3166 code: TH-1206

Pak Kret (Thai: ปากเกร็ด, pronounced [pàːk krèt]) is a district (amphoe) in the northeastern part of Nonthaburi province, central Thailand. The district is most notable for Muang Thong Thani, Ko Kret and Central Chaengwattana. The MRT Pink Line and Udon Ratthaya Expressway serves part of the district.

== Geography ==
The district is in the northeast of the province. It borders (from north clockwise) the districts Lat Lum Kaeo and Mueang Pathum Thani of Pathum Thani province, Don Mueang and Lak Si of Bangkok, and Mueang Nonthaburi and Bang Bua Thong of Nonthaburi. The Chao Phraya River crosses the district. A canal has shortened a large oxbow of the river, Khlong Lat Kret. It was dug in 1722 in the Ayuthaya Era to form the island of Ko Kret.

== Religion ==
There are total forty Theravada Buddhist temples in the district, of which thirty-nine Maha Nikai and one Dhammayut temples.
Further there are seven Christian churches and two Mosques in the district.

== Administrative divisions ==
District location in Nonthaburi province

Map of district with four municipalities

=== Provincial government ===
The district is divided into twelve subdistricts (tambons), which are further subdivided into 85 villages (mubans).

	Subdistricts	People	Villages
1	Pak Kret	35,575	5
2	Bang Talat	43,890	10
3	Ban Mai	35,767	6
4	Bang Phut	62,332	9
5	Bang Tanai	7,478	5
6	Khlong Phra Udom	6,862	6
7	Tha It	18,663	10
8	Ko Kret	5,575	7
9	Om Kret	5,639	6
10	Khlong Khoi	10,537	12
11	Bang Phlap	12,413	5
12	Khlong Kluea	9,885	4
	Total	254,616	85

=== Local government ===
There are four municipalities (thesaban) in the district. Pak Kret has city (thesaban nakhon) municipality status and covers five subdistricts with 34 villages. Tha It and Bang Phlap have town (thesaban mueang) status and cover the whole same-named subdistricts. Khlong Phra Udom has (thesaban tambon) status and covers also the whole same-named subdistrict.

Pak Kret city municipality	187,449
Bang Phut subdistrict	62,332
Bang Talat subdistrict	43,890
Ban Mai subdistrict	35,767
Pak Kret subdistrict	35,575
Khlong Kluea subdistrict	9,885

Tha It town municipality	18,663
Bang Phlap town municipality	12,413

Khlong Phra Udom subd.mun.	6,862

The non-municipal areas are administered by four Subdistrict Administrative Organizations - SAO (ongkan borihan suan tambon - oh boh toh).

Khlong Khoi SAO	10,537
Bang Tanai SAO	7,478
Om Kret SAO	5,639
Ko Kret SAO	5,575

== Education ==
Educational institutions from primary to high education in the district is as follows:

=== High education ===
- Sukhothai Thammathirat Open University

=== Vocational education ===
- AGTC Groomer Training Thailand School.
- Panyapiwat Institute of Management.

=== Secondary education ===
- Total seventeen upper secondary schools with 10,027 students.
- Total nine lower secondary schools with 12,307 students.

=== Primary education ===
- Total seventeen primary schools with 18,228 pupils.

== Health ==
=== Government hospital ===
There is one community hospital in Pak Kret district.

- Pak Kret Hospital with 87 beds.

=== University hospital ===
- Panyanantaphikkhu Medical Center with 400 beds.

=== Private hospitals ===
There are four private hospitals in Pak Kret district:

- Krungthai Hospital with 100 beds
- Mitrmaitri Medical Center with 11 beds
- Vibharam Pakkret Hospital with 100 beds
- World Medical Hospital with 150 beds

=== Health promoting hospitals ===
There are total sixteen health-promoting hospitals in the district.

=== Clinics ===
Around 184 clinics are in Pak Kret district.

== Gallery ==
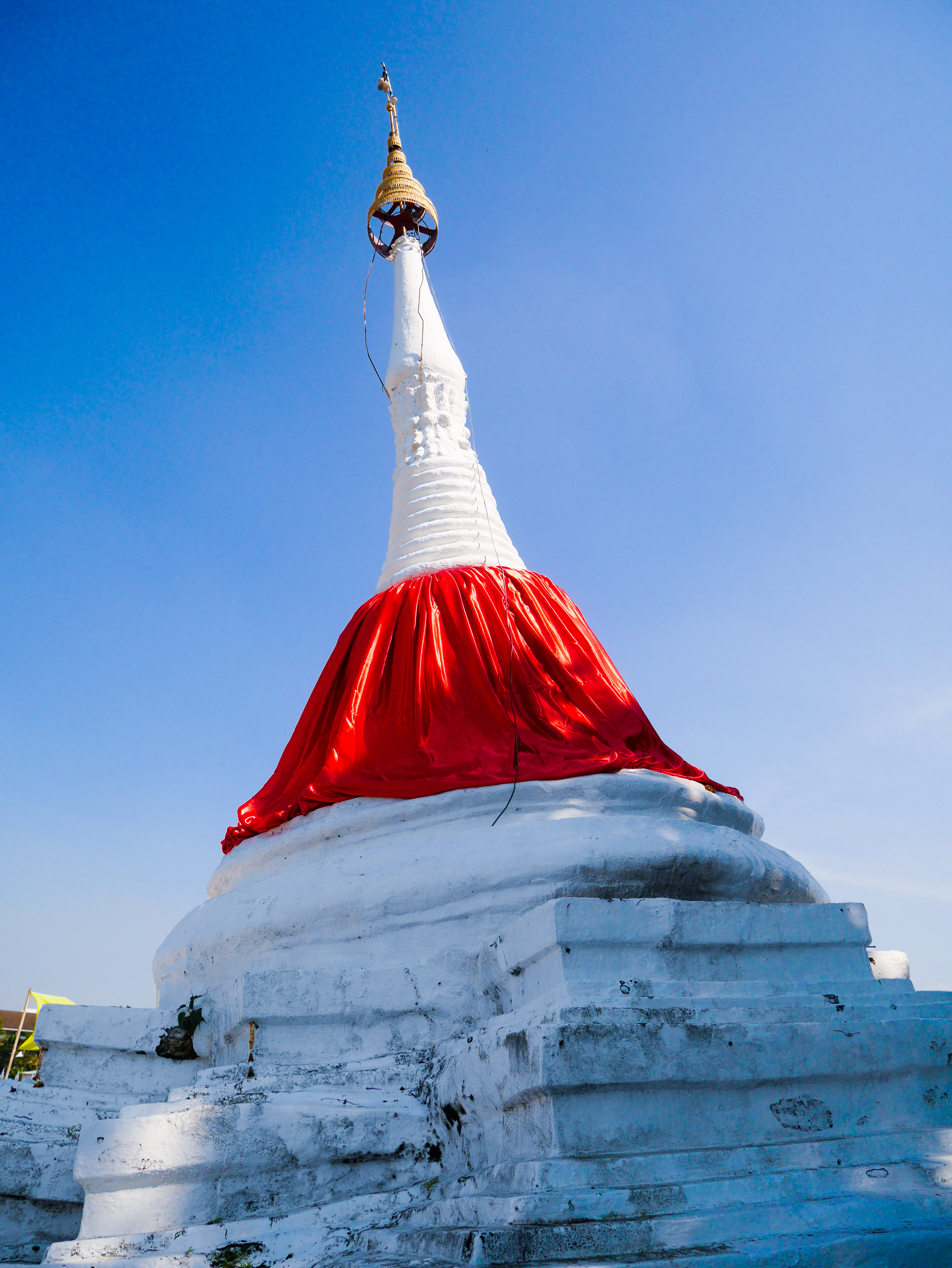
Leaning chedi on Ko Kret

Thai dance at Wat Pailom

== A partial list of primary and secondary schools in Pak Kret ==
1. Pakkred Secondary School
2. Nawamintarachinuthid Horwang Nonthaburi School (also called Horwangnon)
3. Suan Kularb Wittayalai Nonthaburi School (also called Suannon)
4. Triamudom Suksa Nomklao Nonthaburi School (also called Triam Nom Non)
5. Wat Paramaiyikawat School
6. Wat Sala Kun School
7. Pichaya Suksa School
8. International School Bangkok
9. Rose Marie Academy
10. Saint Francis Xavier School
11. Chonprathanwittaya School
