= Pak Kret =

Pak Kret ปากเกร็ด
- City Municipality
- City of Pakkret เทศบาลนครปากเกร็ด
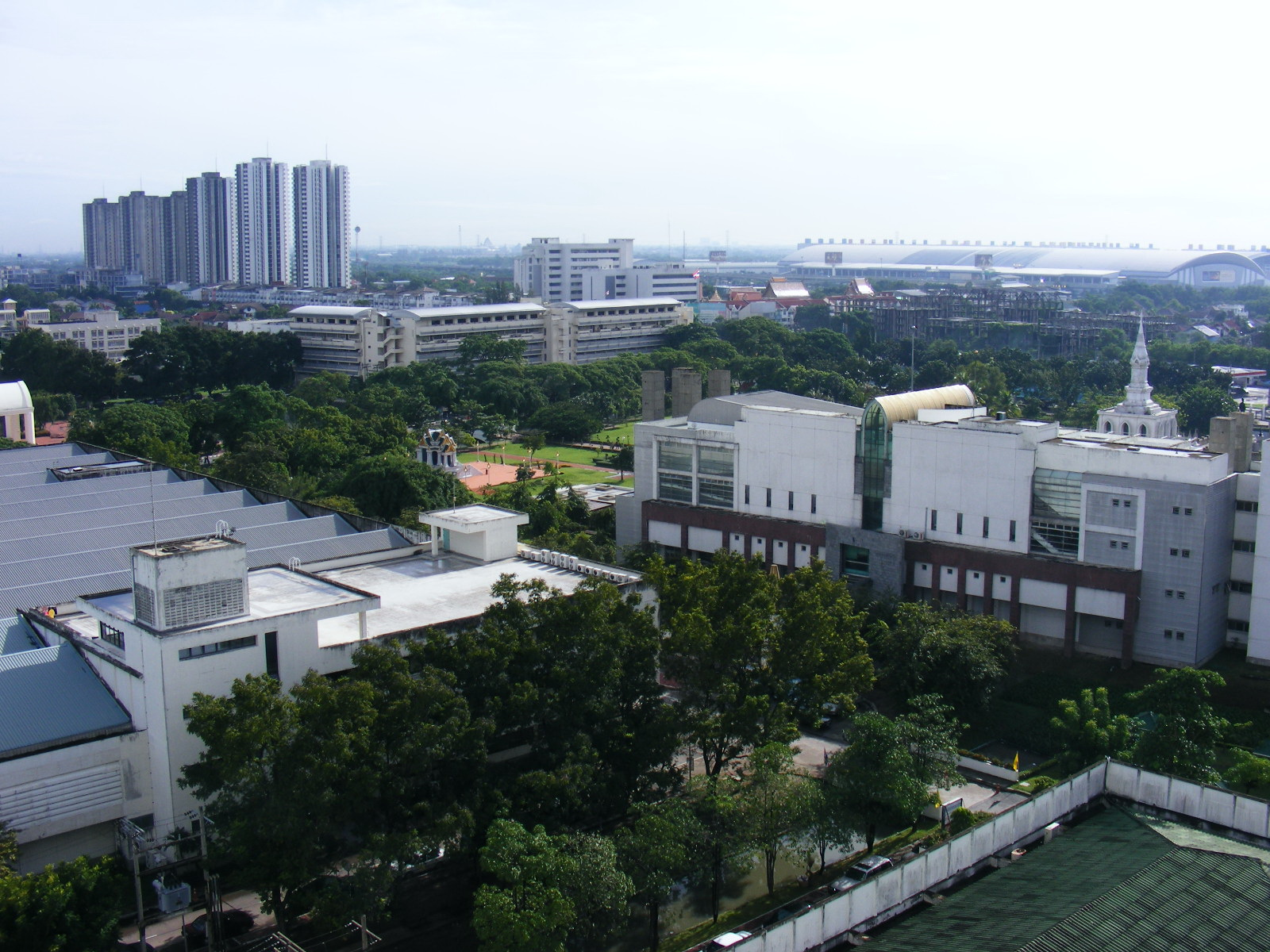
- Aerial view of Sukhothai Thammathirat Open University

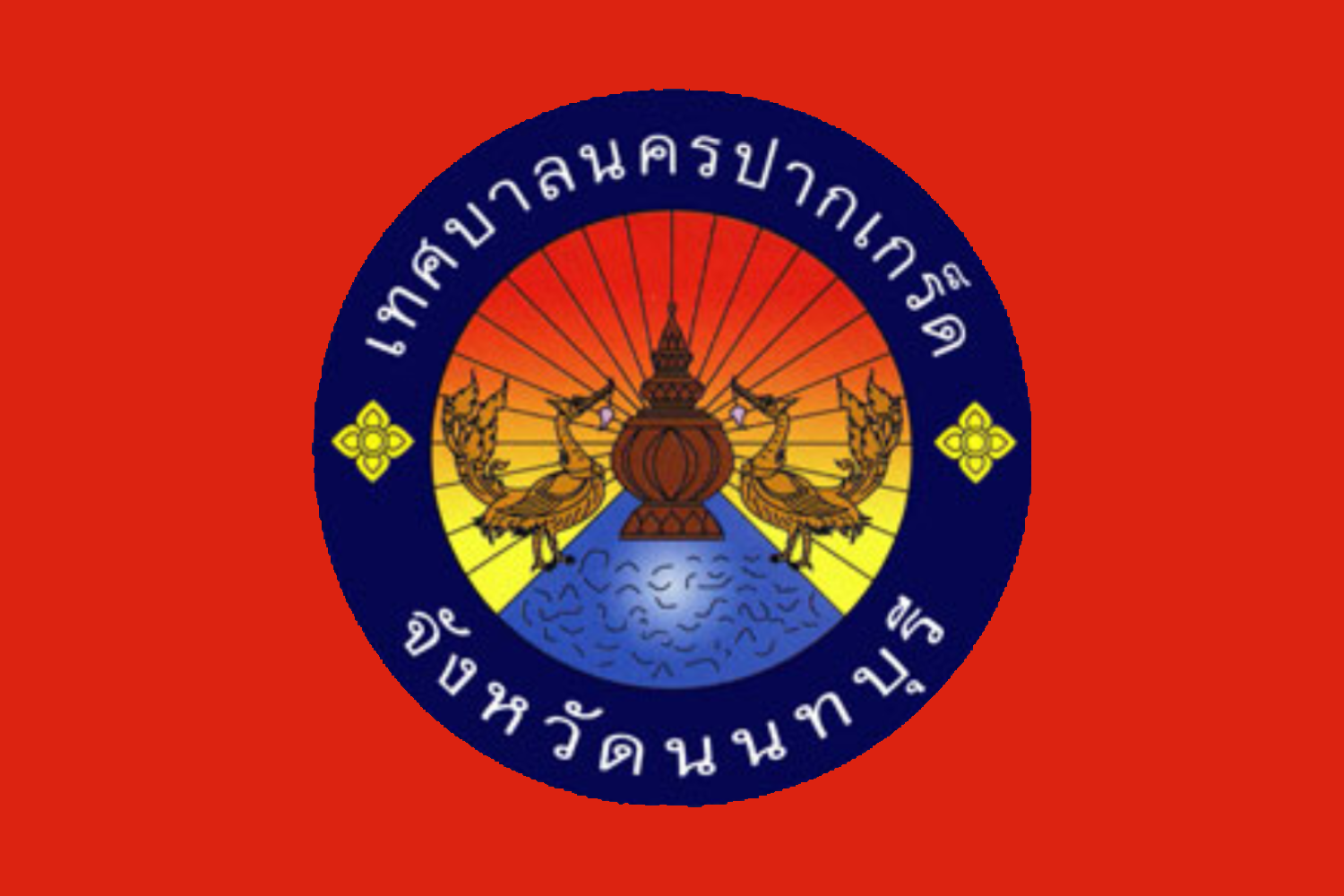
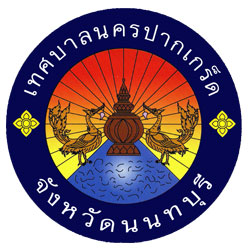
- Flag Seal

- Location in Bangkok Metropolitan Region Location in Thailand
- Coordinates: 13°54′45″N 100°29′52″E
- Country: Thailand
- Province: Nonthaburi
- District: Pak Kret
- Settled: c. 18th century
- Subdistrict municipality: 1 January 1992
- Town municipality: 5 February 1996
- City municipality: 20 April 2000

Government
  - Type: City Municipality
  - Mayor: Wichai Bandasak

Area
  - Total: 36.04 km^{2} (13.92 sq mi)
  - Rank: 14th

Population (2019)
  - Total: 190,272 (Registered residents)
  - Rank: 3rd in Thailand
  - Density: 5,275/km^{2} (13,660/sq mi)
- Time zone: UTC+7 (ICT)
- Postcode: 11120
- Calling code: 02
- Website: www.pakkretcity.go.th

Pak Kret (Thai: ปากเกร็ด, pronounced [pàːk krèt]) is a city (thesaban nakhon) in Nonthaburi province, Thailand. It lies in the Central Thailand plains on the east bank of the lower Chao Phraya River, bordering Bangkok to the east, Mueang Nonthaburi district of Nonthaburi province to the south, and Pathum Thani province to the north. It is part of the Bangkok Metropolitan Region megalopolis. With a registered population of 190,272, Pak Kret is the third most populous city municipality (thesaban nakhon) in Thailand.

The city is most notable for Muang Thong Thani, Ko Kret and Central Chaengwattana. The MRT Pink Line and Udon Ratthaya Expressway serves part of the city.

== History ==
The Pak Kret area has been inhabited since at least the 18th century, under the rule of the Ayutthaya Kingdom. The portion of the Chao Phraya River to the west of Pak Kret city centre was excavated c. 1721–1722 to bypass a bend in the river, forming the island of Ko Kret. The settlements on the bank of the bypass canal and at its mouth became known as Ban Tret Noi (บ้านเตร็ดน้อย) and Ban Pak Tret Noi (บ้านปากเตร็ดน้อย), meaning 'village on the lesser bypass' and 'village on the mouth of the lesser bypass', respectively (the "greater bypass" is further upriver in what is now Mueang Pathum Thani District.) Many ethnic Mon communities settled in the area during the Ayutthaya to early-Rattanakosin periods.

Pak Kret was established as a sanitation district (sukhaphiban) on 31 August 1955. It covers the portion of Pak Kret District east of the river, namely the areas of Pak Kret, Bang Phut, Ban Mai, Bang Talat, and Khlong Kluea Subdistricts. It was incorporated as a subdistrict municipality (thesaban tambon) on 1 January 1992 and was later upgraded to town and then city status on 5 February 1996 and 20 April 2000. As Bangkok rapidly expanded during the late 20th century, so too did Pak Kret, its paddies and orchards being converted to housing estates and other residential areas.

== Geography ==
Most of Pak Kret is low-density residential development. The city centre, sometimes known as Pak Kret Market, lies on the east bank of the Chao Phraya, at the northern branching between the old river course and the new bypass, across from Ko Kret. The municipality and district offices are found here. Two major thoroughfares serve the area: Chaeng Watthana Road runs east–west, linking the city centre to Bangkok's Lak Si District in the east, and Tiwanon Road links Pak Kret to Pathum Thani Province in the north and Nonthaburi in the south, the two crossing at Pak Kret intersection. The viaduct that leads to Rama IV Bridge runs above Chaeng Watthana Road through the city centre, crossing the river toward Khlong Phra Udom Subdistrict. The second-stage expressway links Chaeng Watthana Road southward to downtown Bangkok and northward to Bang Pa-in.

Map of Pak Kret

Muang Thong Thani is the largest housing estate in Pak Kret. It is the site of Sukhothai Thammathirat Open University and Impact, Muang Thong Thani, a large exhibition centre complex. Srinagarindra Park and the CentralPlaza Chaengwattana shopping centre are also within the city. The MRT Pink Line, which opened in 2023, runs along Chaeng Watthana and Tiwanon roads. The line links Pak Kret and Muang Thong Thani to Lak Si and Nonthaburi.

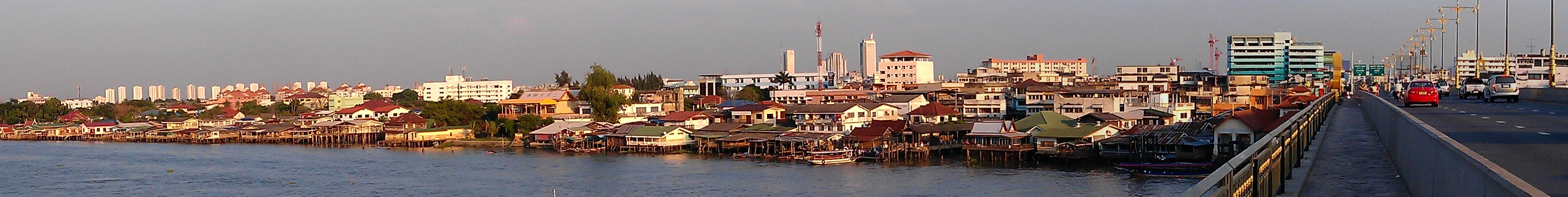
Pak Kret waterfront viewed from Rama IV Bridge. The high-rises of Muang Thong Thani are visible in the background to the left

== Organizations ==
The International Schools Association of Thailand is headquartered in Pak Kret.
