= Ko Kret =

Island in Chao Phraya river, Thailand

Native name: เกาะเกร็ด
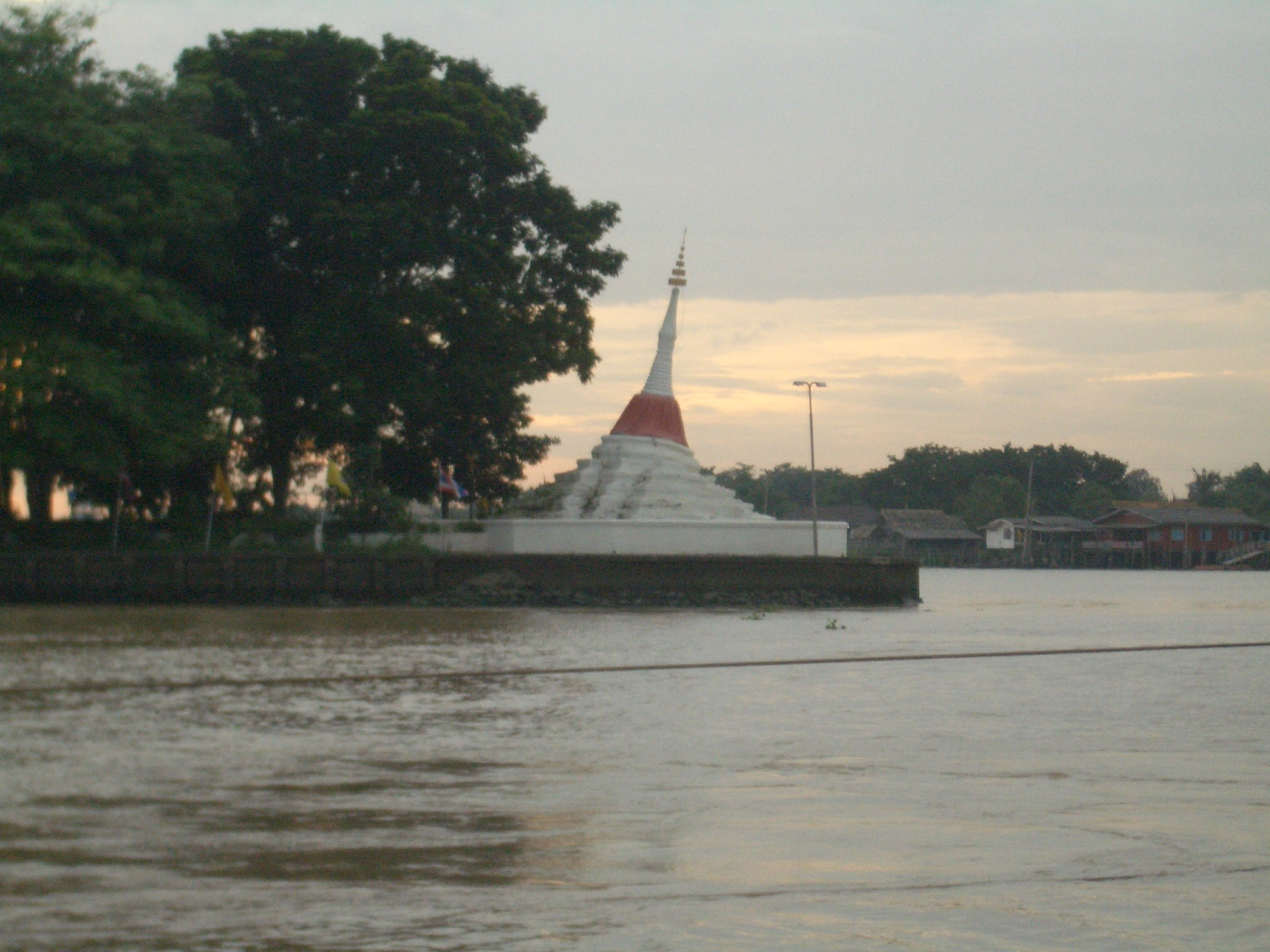
- Leaning pagoda of Wat Paramaiyikawat
- Interactive map of Ko Kret

Geography
- Location: Chao Phraya River
- Coordinates: 13.9069362°N 100.4733154°E
- Coastline: 13 km (8.1 mi)

Administration
- Thailand

Demographics
- Population: 6,174 (2012 Census)
- Ethnic groups: Thai, Mon

Ko Kret (Thai: เกาะเกร็ด, pronounced [kɔ̀ʔ krèt] , Mon : တ္ကအ်ကြေတ် ) is a small island in the Chao Phraya River in Nonthaburi province, Thailand. It is around 3 km (1.9 mi) long and 3 km (1.9 mi) wide with an area of over 4.2 square kilometers. It has seven main villages, the largest and most populous being Ban Mon. The island is best known for Thai-Mon people who make pottery for a living. The island is served by ferries.

== History ==
Ko Kret was originally a meander located on Chao Phraya River. Due to Chao Praya river's curvy path, ships often took longer time to reach Ayutthaya, Siam's capital at the time. During the reign of King Thaisa, His majesty wanted to reduce shipping time and improve the kingdom's economy. Thus, he planned a canal which would bypass the meander and act as a shortcut for maritime transport. According to the Ayutthaya chronicles, the canal was dug in 1722, requiring around 10,000 men and taking over a month to complete. After the canal was dug, shipping to Ayutthaya became faster and the canal was called "Klong Lat Kret" by locals. As time passes, the canal became gradually wider due to erosion and became part of the river itself, causing Ko Kret to become an island.

Ko Kret has thrived since the Ayutthaya period. But when the Burmese occupied the city, the island was deserted. After Siam gained independence, King Taksin allowed Mon people to settle down on Ko Kret. Later, when Pak Kret was set the name of the district and the sub-district, Ko Kret was set as the name of the district until now.

During the Second World War, Ko Kret was used as a hiding place for many politicians and officers to avoid the bombing of Bangkok. Many of them built spare houses to stay in case Bangkok fell into crisis. After the war, these houses were confiscated by the government.

== Administration ==
=== Central administration ===
Ko Kret also has a status of one of 12 tambons (sub-districts) of Pak Kret district subdivided into seven administrative villages

No.	Name	Thai
1.	Ban Lat Kret (Ban Mon)	บ้านลัดเกร็ด (บ้านมอญ)
2.	Ban Sala Kun Nok	บ้านศาลากุลนอก
3.	Ban Sala Kun Nai	บ้านศาลากุลใน
4.	Ban Khlong Sa Nam Oi	บ้านคลองสระน้ำอ้อย
5.	Ban Tha Nam	บ้านท่าน้ำ
6.	Ban Sao Thong Thong	บ้านเสาธงทอง
7.	Ban Ong Ang	บ้านโอ่งอ่าง

=== Local administration ===
The area of the sub-district is shared by local government.

- the subdistrict administrative organization (SAO) Ko Kret (องค์การบริหารส่วนตำบลเกาะเกร็ด)

== Tourism ==
Despite being only a small island that is the residence of Mon, Ko Kret has six temples, one of which is a deserted temple, one masjid, two schools, and one hospital. The most prominent temple is Wat Paramai Yikawat, an ancient Mon temple on the banks of the Chao Phraya river. The most notable thing of this temple is a leaning white Mon style chedi at the corner of the island where the Chao Phraya river and Lat-Kret with Om-Kret meet. It is considered a landmark of Ko Kret.

At present, Ko Kret is promoted as a cultural tourism destination of Nonthaburi. Visitors will experience the way of life of locals and learn about pottery making which is their main occupation, or renting a bicycle to ride around the island without any time limit. Moreover, still have the opportunity to sample many rare foods which is mostly Mon food such as khao chae, fried flower and thot man no kala, a variation of Thai fishcake, that mixed no kala (Alpinia nigra). It is a local food that is not found in other places.

Ko Kret is accessible from many ferry routes such as from Wat Sanam Nuea to the pier in front of Wat Paramai Yikawat or from pier under the Rama IV Bridge to pier between Wat Phai Lom and Wat Paramai Yikawat etc.

Ko Kret is open for visitors only on Saturday–Sunday and public holidays from 9:00 am to 05:30 pm.

== See also ==
- List of islands of Thailand
