= Muang Thong Thani MRT station =

Railway station in Bangkok, Thailand

Muang Thong Thani เมืองทองธานี
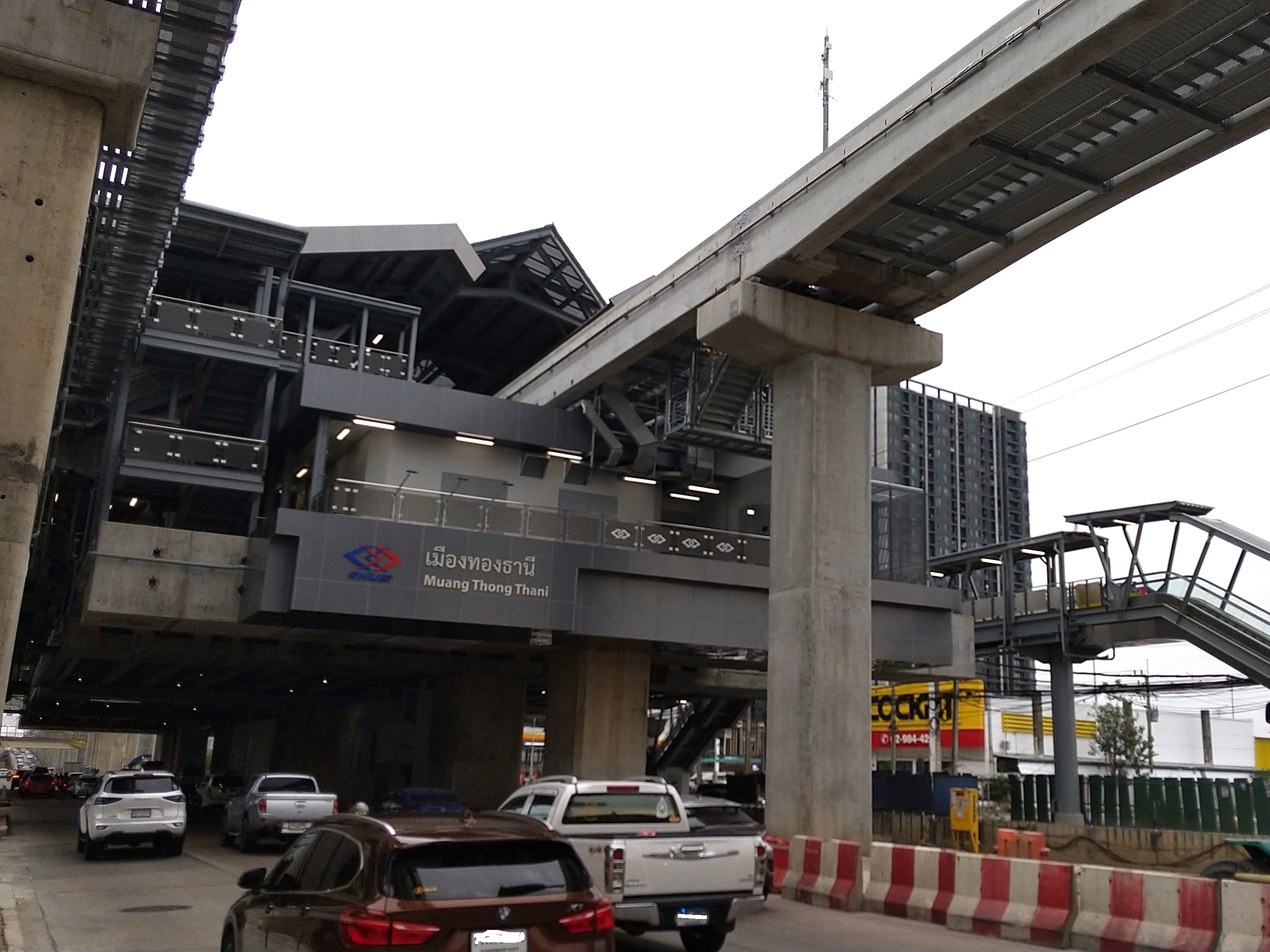

General information
- Location: Pak Kret District, Nonthaburi province, Thailand
- Coordinates: 13.8974°N 100.5484°E
- System: MRT
- Owner: Mass Rapid Transit Authority of Thailand (MRTA)
- Operator: Northern Bangkok Monorail Company Limited
- Line: Pink Line

Other information
- Station code: PK10

History
- Opened: 21 November 2023 (Mainline)

Services
Preceding station	Metropolitan Rapid Transit	Following station
Si Rat towards Nonthaburi Civic Center	Pink Line	Chaeng Watthana 14 towards Min Buri
Terminus	Pink Line Muang Thong Thani Line	Impact Muang Thong Thani towards Lake Muang Thong Thani
Location

Muang Thong Thani station (Thai: สถานีเมืองทองธานี) is a Bangkok MRT station on the Pink Line. The station is located on Chaeng Watthana Road in Pak Kret district, Nonthaburi province. The station has four exits and act an interchange between the Pink Line main line and the Muang Thong Thani Line which serves Muang Thong Thani and IMPACT. The station opened on 21 November 2023 as part of trial operations on the entire Pink Line main line.

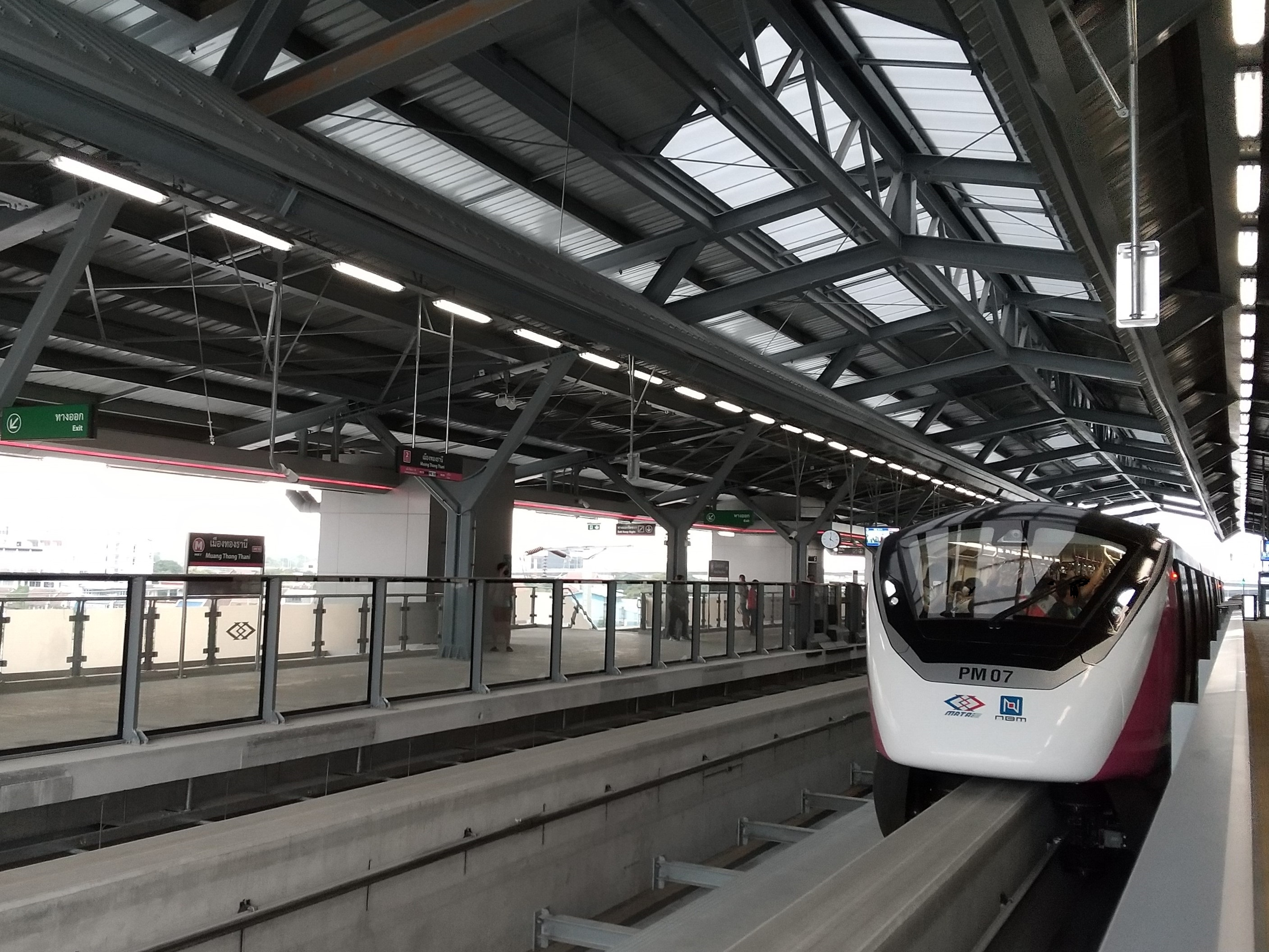
Platforms

The station was initially named "Si Rat" while the current Si Rat station was named "Muang Thong Thani", but the names were swapped to accommodate and prevent confusion for which station to change at for the Impact spur line. The station consists of one side platform and one island platform.

== See also ==
Other interchange stations in Bangkok with paid area integration.

- Krung Thep Aphiwat Central Terminal (Bang Sue Grand Station)
- Siam BTS station
- Tao Poon MRT station
- Wat Phra Sri Mahathat station
