= Impact Arena =

Indoor arena near Bangkok, Thailand

- อิมแพ็ค อารีน่า
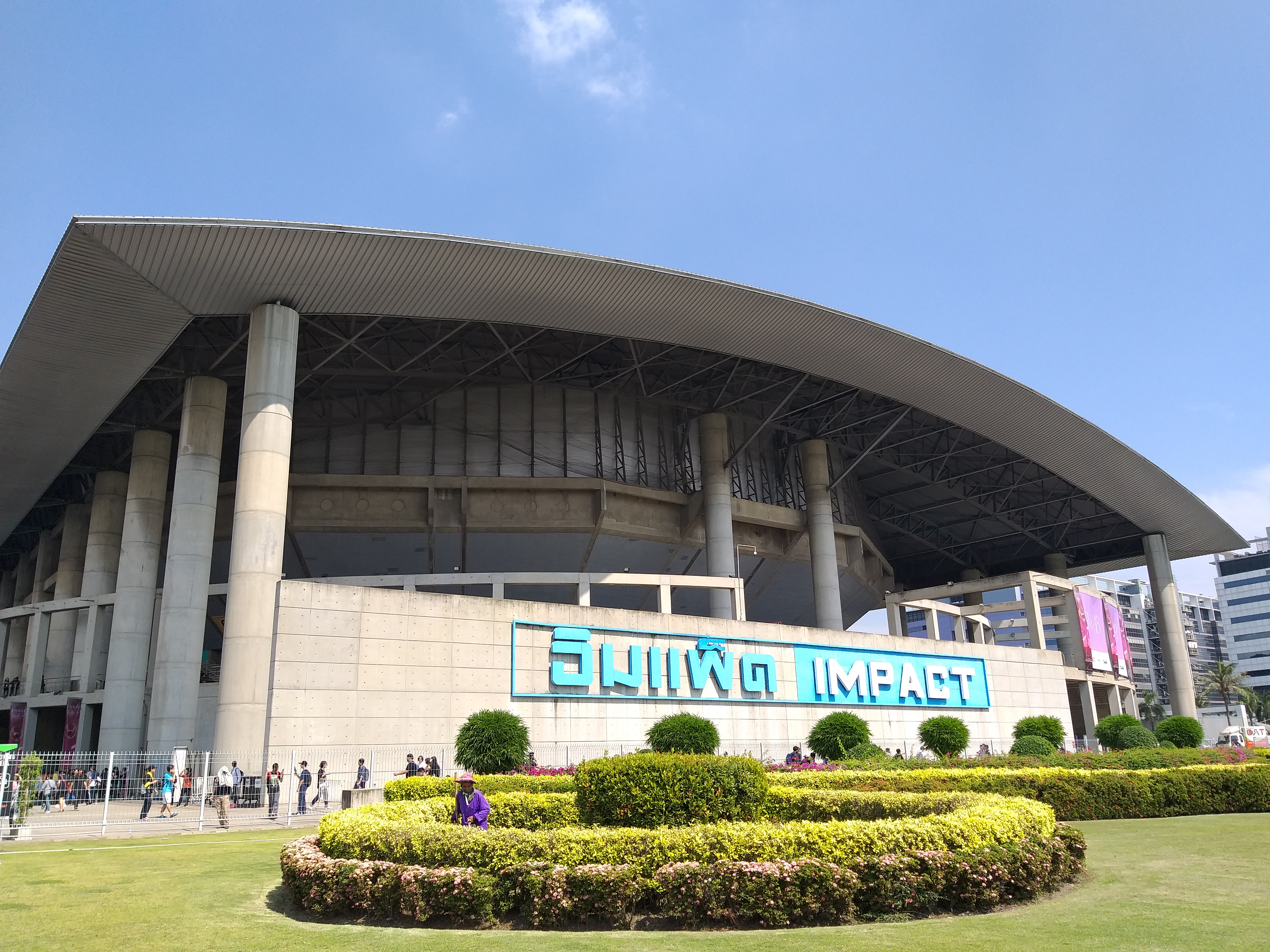
- Impact Arena in 2019
- Interactive map of Impact Arena
- Location: Ban Mai, Pak Kret, Nonthaburi, Thailand
- Coordinates: 13°54′41″N 100°32′54″E
- Owner: Bangkok Land
- Operator: Impact Exhibition Management Co., Ltd.
- Capacity: 12,000
- Record attendance: 13,592 (Dua Lipa concert, November 27, 2024)
- Public transit: MRT Impact Muang Thong Thani

Construction
- Groundbreaking: 1996
- Opened: December 1998
- Architect: Mati Tangpanich

The Impact Arena (Thai: อิมแพ็ค อารีน่า) is a multi-purpose indoor arena located in the Impact, Muang Thong Thani commercial complex in Pak Kret, Nonthaburi, Thailand, north of Bangkok. It was opened in December 1998 and is owned by the Bangkok Land Public Company Limited. The arena has a capacity of 12,000 people.

== Background and history ==
Impact Arena is located in the Muang Thong Thani development complex and was constructed in 1996 by the Bangkok Land Public Company Limited to support the 1998 Asian Games hosted in Bangkok. It was used as a stadium for amateur boxing competitions before the surrounding area was later developed into the Impact Muang Thong Thani Exhibition and Convention Center. The arena regularly hosts concerts, contests, entertainment activities, and many other meetings.

== Design ==
The Impact Arena has an interior that consists of two floors and three sides of grandstands. It can accommodate a maximum of 12,000 spectators in the standard arena mode, while a theater mode can accommodate 3,580 people. The area in the middle of the building is rectangular, suitable for organizing concerts, entertainment activities, meetings, and various sports competitions. The ceiling is 24 meters high with dedicated areas for ticket sales, souvenir stands managed by concert organizers, and a food court.

== Events ==
=== Sports events ===
The Impact Arena was one of the venues used during the 1998 Asian Games. From 2003 to 2013, it hosted the Thailand Open Tennis Tournament. In 2018 and 2022, the arena hosted the Uber Cup Badminton World Men's and Women's Team Championships. In 2025, the arena will host pencak silat events during 2025 SEA Games.

=== Concerts ===
The arena has hosted numerous major concerts and shows by many artists and bands worldwide.
