= Anant Kanjanapas =

Thai businessman (1941–2020)

Anant Kanjanapas (Thai: อนันต์ กาญจนพาสน์, 2 June 1941 – 13 April 2020) was a Sino-Thai business executive, best known as CEO and chairman of Bangkok Land, developer of the Muang Thong Thani project in the northern suburbs of Bangkok.

Anant was the second child and oldest son of Mongkol Kanjanapas, patriarch of the Kanjanapas family. He grew up in Thailand, and attended university in Switzerland. He moved with the family to Hong Kong, where he became an executive at the family's Stelux Holdings, and returned to Thailand in 1989 to head Bangkok Land. Under his leadership and amid an economic boom in Thailand, the company grew spectacularly in the early 1990s, but came crashing down as a result of the 1997 Asian financial crisis. Anant spent the next decade relatively quietly, reviving the company through the Impact, Muang Thong Thani exhibition and convention centre, finally announcing completion of the company's debt restructuring in 2012, when it paid dividends for the first time in fifteen years. Anant had many political connections, and served as an appointed senator from 1992 to 2000. He continued to head Bangkok Land until his death, and is succeeded in the business by his two sons with his wife Sophie, Peter and Paul. His younger brother Keeree headed the family's other main venture in Thailand, BTS Group Holdings.
