= Muang Thong Thani =

Real estate development in Pak Kret, Thailand

Coordinates: 13°55′00″N 100°32′30″E

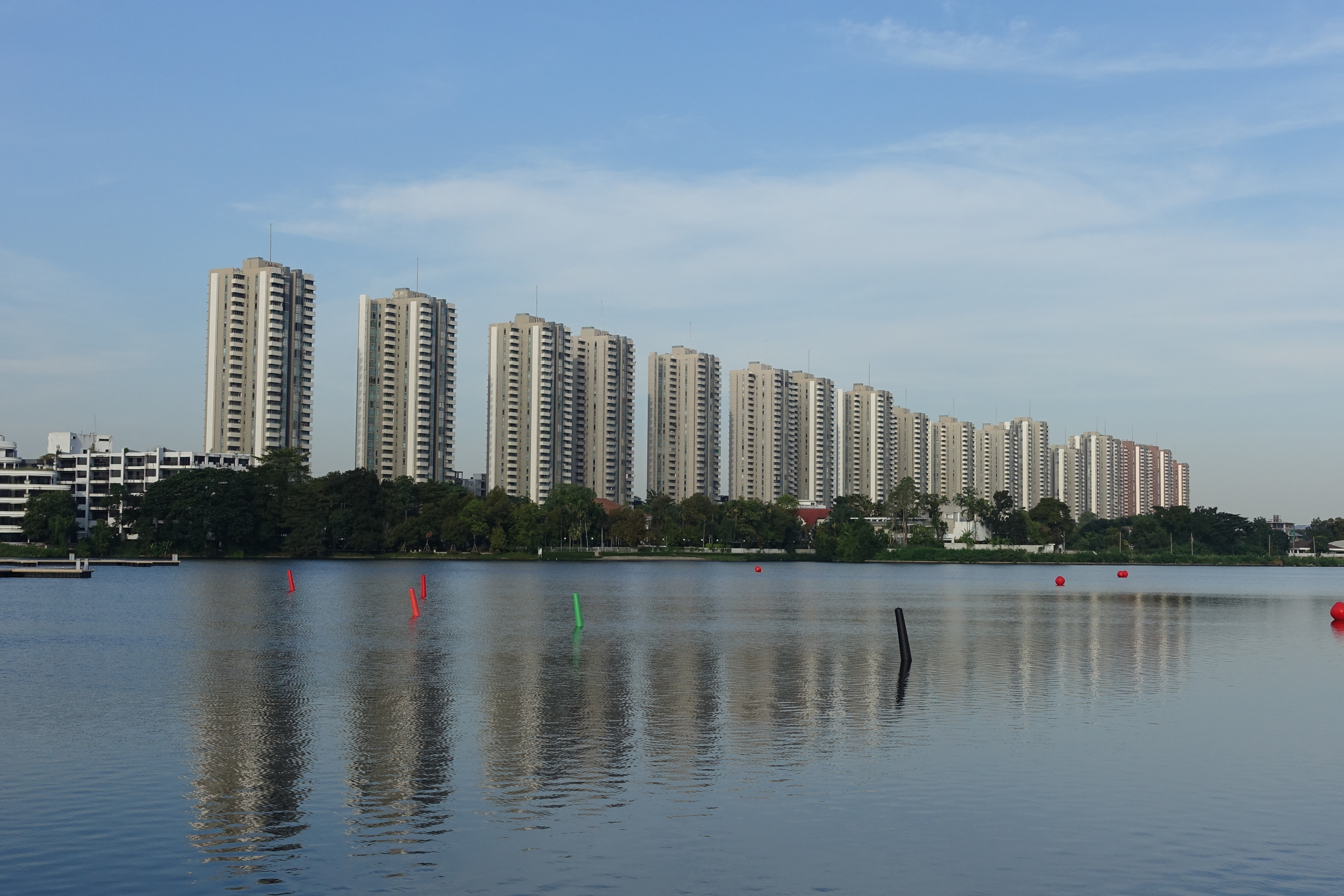
The towering Lake View Condominiums, seen across the central lake

Muang Thong Thani (Thai: เมืองทองธานี (Note: RTGS: Mueang Thong Thani, pronounced [mɯ̄aŋ tʰɔ̄ːŋ tʰāː.nīː].) 'golden city') is a large real estate development in Pak Kret, a northern suburb city of Bangkok, in Thailand's Nonthaburi Province. It was mainly developed from the late 1980s by the Bangkok Land Company under the leadership of Anant Kanjanapas, and was envisioned as a satellite city along the lines of the new towns of Hong Kong. It was rapidly built in the early 1990s amid Thailand's booming economy, but ground to a halt with the 1997 Asian financial crisis, a rise and fall that epitomizes Thailand's real estate bubble of the 1990s. Muang Thong Thani's development has since mostly been focused around its Impact exhibition and convention centre, one of the largest in Southeast Asia, built upon facilities created for the 1998 Asian Games. Muang Thong Thani is also the site of Sukhothai Thammathirat Open University, and is home to the Muangthong United Football Club.

Muang Thong Thani is connected to Chaeng Watthana, Tiwanon and Prachachuen roads (the last of which runs along the Bangkok–Nonthaburi border). A soi branching from Chaeng Watthana road, Chaeng Watthana-Pak Kret 39, is one of the main throughfares within Muang Thong Thani. Udon Ratthaya Expressway traverse above this soi and serves the area. The area is also served by the Impact Muang Thong Thani and Lake Muang Thong Thani stations on the Muang Thong Thani line, a branch line of the MRT Pink Line (branching from the main line at Muang Thong Thani station). Most of the branch line's track is located above the aforementioned expressway.

== History ==
=== Development ===
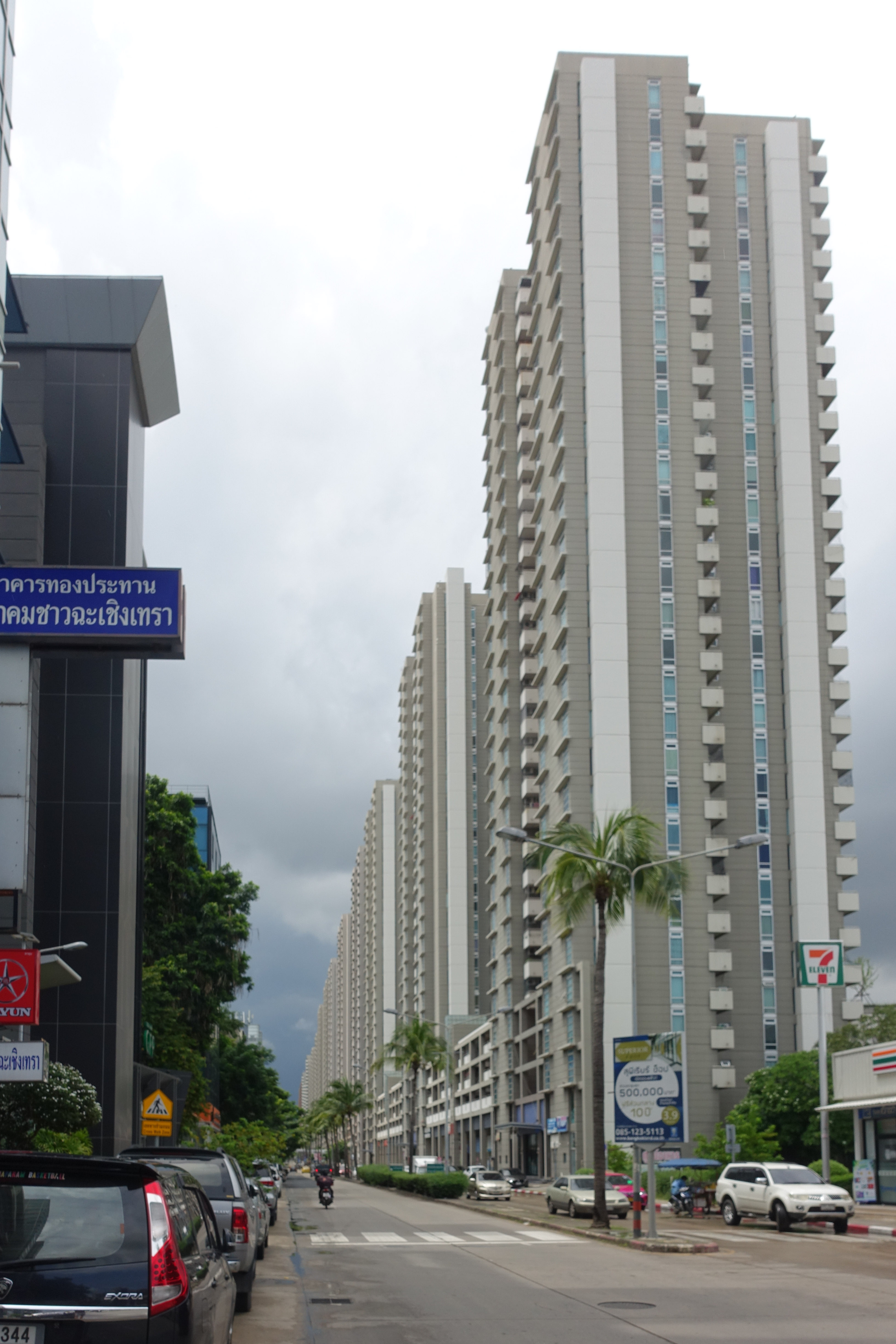
The Lake View Condominiums form a large edifice along the length of Bond Street.

Muang Thong Thani was developed from extensive land banks built up by Mongkol Kanjanapas, founder of the Bangkok Land Company, over the 1970s. Back then, the area, on the northern outskirts of Bangkok, not far from Don Mueang International Airport and mainly served by Chaeng Watthana Road, was mostly undeveloped and dominated by paddy fields. Mongkol amassed about 4,500 rai (720 ha; 1,800 acres) of land in the area, which he bought at prices of about 40,000 baht per rai (US$10,000/ha, $4,000/acre). Bangkok rapidly grew throughout the 1980s, and by the late 1980s, prices had risen two-hundredfold to 20,000 baht per square wa or 8 million per rai ($50 million/ha, $20 million/acre), allowing the company to profit greatly from land development.

Muang Thong Thani was initially developed from 1978 as a regular housing estate complex, with land subdivided and sold mostly to individual homeowners. In 1989, at the height of Thailand's economic boom, Mongkol's son Anant Kanjanapas returned from Hong Kong to head the company, and announced a new vision: to develop Muang Thong Thani as a privately owned, self-contained satellite city along the lines of the new towns of Hong Kong, which would house up to 700,000 residents. The project aimed to capture demand resulting from the emerging Thai middle class and Bangkok's rapid growth, as well as the impending handover of Hong Kong in 1997, which was expected to trigger waves of migration. A flurry of construction began, and the company built dozens of high-rise luxury condominium towers, mid-rise apartment blocks, office and retail buildings, and flatted factories for light industry. The entire development was designed by Australian architectural firm Nation Fender, and the construction undertaken by France-based Bouygues-Thai. Enabled by financial liberalization policies by the Bank of Thailand that opened up capital markets to foreign funds, the project was enthusiastically supported by investors and proceeded at incredible speed—an entire city arising out of the ground within a few years.

The development also appears to have benefited from government support, including modifications of the land-use plan for Nonthaburi Province and the placement of the terminal ramp of the Si Rat Expressway, which opened in 1993, right next to Muang Thong Thani's entrance, connecting it to the inner city and boosting the project's value. The family is known for lobbying through political connections and public gifts—Mongkol had donated land in Muang Thong Thani for the establishment of Sukhothai Thammathirat Open University in 1981, and donations were also made for an office of the government Department of Lands and electrical substations.

=== Crisis and recovery ===
By the mid 1990s, the oversupplied real estate market was beginning to collapse, and construction in Muang Thong Thani came to a halt as buyers—mostly driven by speculation and not actual demand—defaulted on payments, leaving Bangkok Land short of cash and with thousands of units it was unable to sell. The company, valued at $5.2 billion following its public listing in 1992, dropped in value to $36 million after the 1997 Asian financial crisis, with $1 billion of debt—a rise and fall that epitomizes the unrestrained borrowing and speculation that led to the crisis. Mike Douglass and Pornpan Boonchuen in 2006 called it "one of the greatest planning disasters of the 20th century". However, the family was able to enter into debt restructuring plans that allowed them to retain control of the company. The company had also been helped by the sale of a few entire blocks to the Ministry of Defence in 1996 and early 1997, which raised questions of bribery.

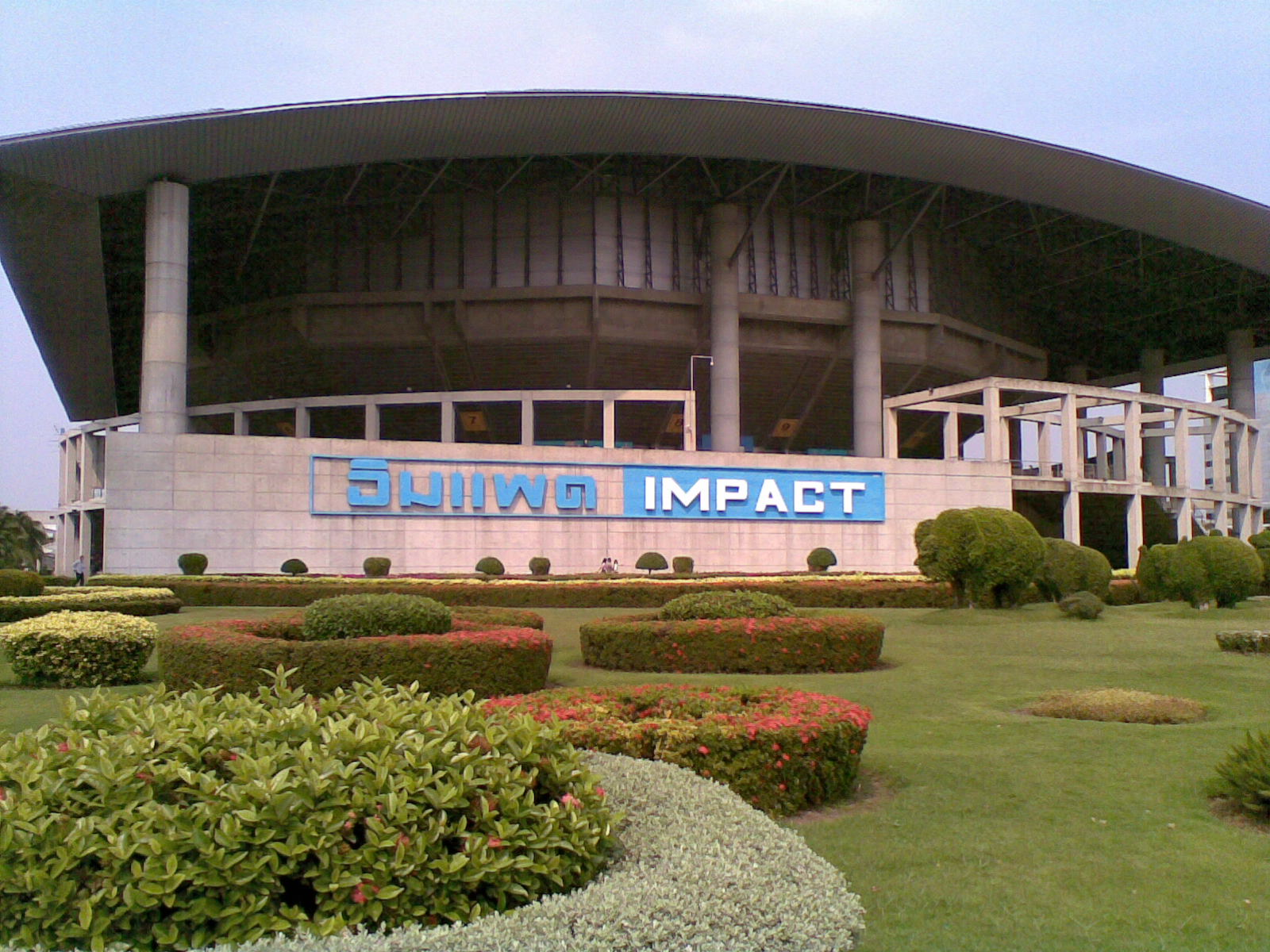
Impact Arena, part of the original Asian Games venue, is now a major event space and concert hall.

The 1998 Asian Games in Bangkok proved a turning point for the project, which, before the crisis, had been chosen as one of its venues. Despite the company's financial problems, it completed the Muang Thong Thani Sports Complex for the games, though with barely time to spare. Following the games' conclusion, the venue was converted to an exhibition and convention centre complex titled Impact, Muang Thong Thani. With private demand still low following the crisis, Anant worked to promote the centre and lobbied for it to be chosen for government events, including the Board of Investment's BOI Fair in 2000, which began to bring in a steady stream of revenue. The complex was gradually expanded, becoming one of the largest convention centres in Southeast Asia.

While the crisis left the luxury projects mostly empty, as well as the commercial buildings, the low-cost Popular Condominiums near the Impact complex attracted many buyers, and came to house a population of up to 75,000 in 2000, according to Anant. The area developed into a large urban community with an active street life, with shops and restaurants filling the buildings' street-facing ground floors. However, Muang Thong Thani remained primarily residential and never achieved economic self-containment, most of its residents commuting for outside work, especially in Bangkok. As Bangkok Land's finances improved, especially since 2012 when it exited debt restructuring, it has engaged in a new, more measured wave of construction, focusing on shopping malls and retail complexes aimed at capturing local and visitor spending. From 2018 to 2020, the family successfully pushed for the approval of a branch line of the Pink Line monorail into Muang Thong Thani, directly serving the Impact complex. The main Pink Line had in 2017 been awarded to a joint venture led by BTS Group Holdings, another major holding of the family.

== Features ==
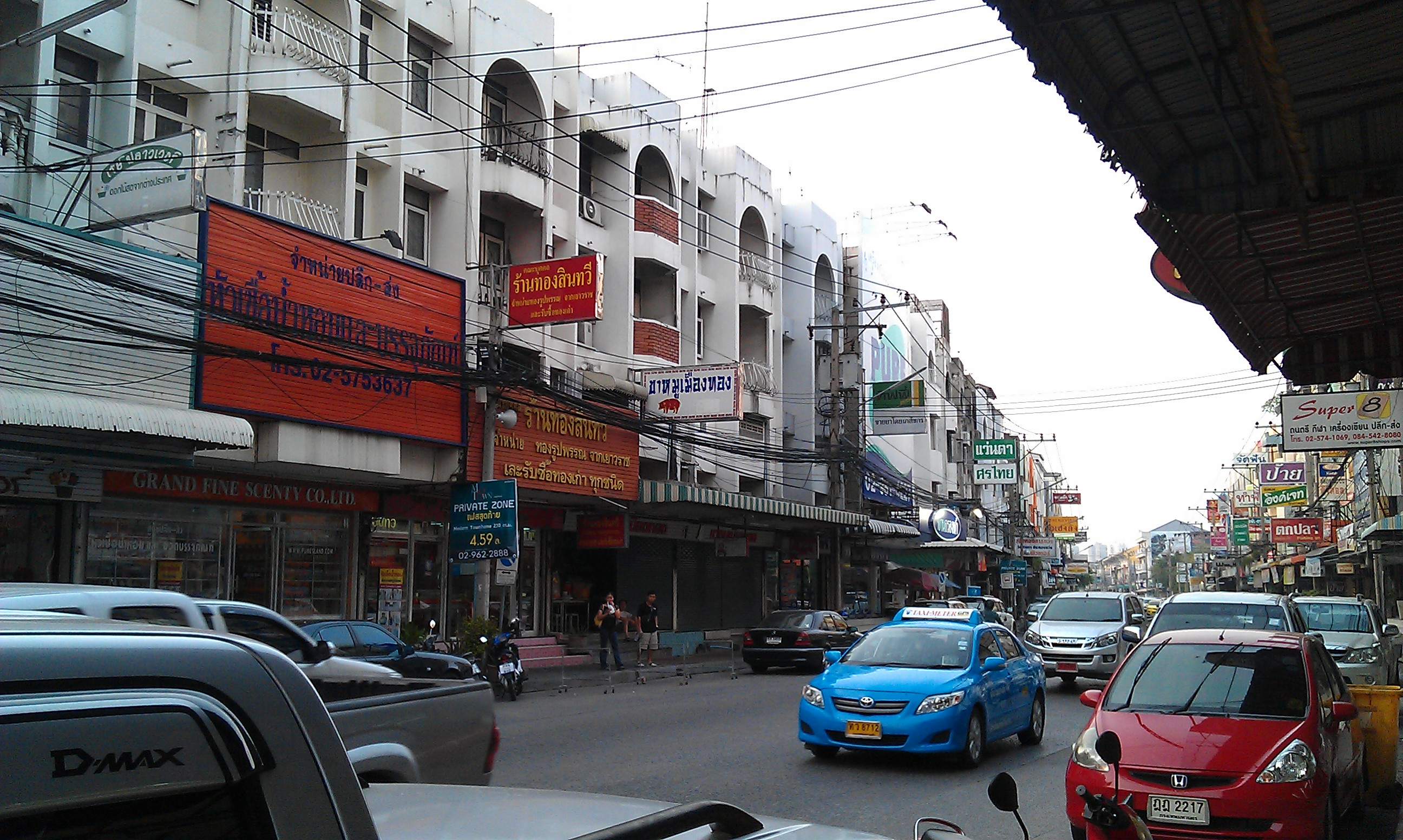
The original main street into the development is lined by shophouses, as seen in 2012.

Muang Thong Thani covers areas in Ban Mai, Bang Phut and Khlong Kluea subdistricts of the Pak Kret District of Nonthaburi Province, within the city municipality of Pak Kret. The development has two roughly parallel main streets, which link between Chaeng Watthana and Tiwanon roads: Soi Chaeng Watthana–Pak Kret 33 (ซอยแจ้งวัฒนะ-ปากเกร็ด 33), the original main street belonging to the initial development, is also known as Bond Street, a name used to promote the satellite city project, while Soi Chaeng Watthana–Pak Kret 39 serves as the main entrance to the Impact complex from Chaeng Watthana Road. A pair of parallel crossing streets link the two, and serve the Impact complex and Popular Condominiums, beyond which the streets connect to Prachachuen Road, which runs along the Bangkok–Nonthaburi border. The Si Rat Expressway provides access from Chaeng Watthana Road, while the Udon Ratthaya Expressway, which was constructed for the Asian Games and continues northward from Si Rat, has entrance/exit ramps directly inside Muang Thong Thani.

The original housing estate projects are clustered around Bond Street, which is lined by older shophouses near its Chaeng Watthana end. Further down lie Sukhothai Thammathirat Open University (STOU), the Department of Lands office, and the Buddhist temple Wat Phasuk Maneechak. Beehive Lifestyle Mall—a two-storey community shopping centre—opened opposite STOU in 2014. From near its midpoint to Tiwanon, Bond Street is lined by developments of the satellite city project: on one side are the Lake View Condominiums—twenty-four 30-storey residential towers overlooking an artificial lake (some of which remain unfinished)—and on the other are the Villa Offices—ninety 5-storey commercial buildings intended for office/retail/residential mixed-use.

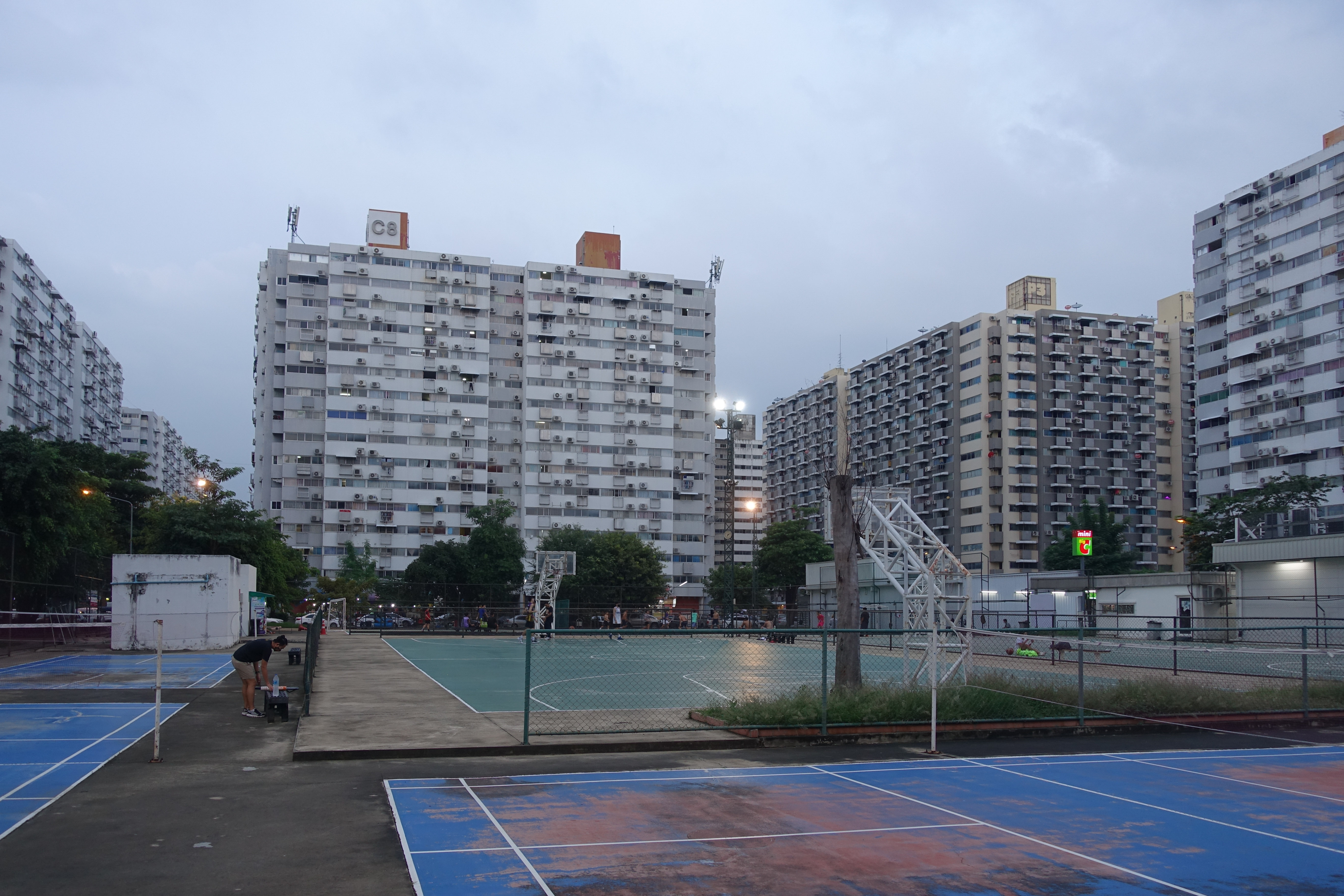
The popular condominiums, seen across the communal sports pitch in the evening

On the other side of the second main road lie the Impact, Muang Thong Thani complex and several retail developments, along with the Popular Condominiums and the flatted factories, which are titled the Industry Condominiums. In the vicinity of Impact are the Thunderdome Stadium (home to the Muangthong United Football Club) and Thunder Dome, both of which are also former Asian Games venues, but are owned by the Sports Authority of Thailand. Also from the Asian Games are tennis courts which were used by the Lawn Tennis Association of Thailand from 1999 to 2004, but are now operated by the Impact Tennis Academy (the Lawn Tennis Association now occupies a newer venue next to Wat Phasuk). More recent developments include the Novotel and Ibis hotels, a small satellite campus of Silpakorn University, and the Cosmo Bazaar mall, which features a cinema and also serves as a public minibus van station. The minibuses, along with the BMTA 166 bus line which terminates nearby and at the Victory Monument in Bangkok, serve as the main modes of public transport to Muang Thong Thani, in addition to the Pink Line monorail, the main line of which opened in late 2023. Running along Chaeng Watthana Road, the main line's Si Rat station serves the development's original Bond Street entrance, while the Muang Thong Thani branch line, which opened for trial runs in May 2025, runs along Soi Chaeng Watthana–Pak Kret 39, with two stations directly serving the Impact complex: Impact Muang Thong Thani and Lake Muang Thong Thani.

Of the eight Industry Condominiums, those that are occupied have been converted to office use, including by the Defence Technology Institute and Kasikornbank. The Popular Condominiums consist of twenty-seven 16-storey apartment blocks, each housing about 1,000 units. Originally marketed to teachers and civil servants, they now mostly house lower-middle income tenants. St. Francis Xavier School is here near the Prachachuen entrance/exit, and there are also a few other small primary schools and kindergartens within the wider development.

Nearer to Tiwanon Road from Impact are the Double Lake Condominiums, higher-end eight-storey apartment buildings launched by Bangkok Land in 2012. The Muang Thong Thani area also contains residential projects by other developers who acquired properties that had been relinquished by Bangkok Land in its debt-restructuring process, including the M Society Condominiums funded by Singapore-based Real Estate Capital Asia Partners, which redeveloped three of the unfinished Lake View towers in 2011, and several housing estates by Pruksa Real Estate. An extensive police office complex, initially planned as the Central Investigation Bureau headquarters but now used by the Immigration Bureau, lies next to Thunder Dome near the Impact complex.

Map of Muang Thong Thani
Retail and commercial developments
1. Impact, Muang Thong Thani
  1. Impact Arena
  2. Impact Exhibition Center
  3. Impact Challenger
  4. Impact Forum
  5. The Portal Lifestyle Complex
6. Novotel Bangkok Impact
7. Ibis Bangkok Impact
8. Impact Fitness and Impact Tennis Academy
9. Impact Lakefront and Impact Speed Park
10. Outlet Square
11. Cosmo Bazaar
12. Cosmo Walk
13. Beehive Lifestyle Mall
14. Ruamjai Fresh Market
15. Thunder Dome
16. Thunderdome Stadium
2. Industrial Condominiums
  17. Bangkok Land headquarters
  18. Defence Technology Institute
  19. Kasikornbank Chaeng Wattana Office
  20. Kasikorn Business-Technology Group
  21. Cosmo Office Park
3. Villa Offices
Bangkok Land residential developments
4. Lake View Condominiums
5. Popular Condominiums
  22. "Teachers" (T1–T14)
  23. "Civil servants" (C1–C9)
  24. "Pailin Square" (P1–P4)
25. Double Lake Condominiums

Third-party residential developments

26. M Society Condominiums (M Residence)
27. Chuan Chuen Modus Centro (MK Real Estate)
28. The Plant (Pruksa Real Estate)
29. The Connect (Pruksa Real Estate)
30. The Plant Citi (Pruksa Real Estate)
31. Patio (Pruksa Real Estate)
32. Baan 365 Muangthong (LPN Development)

Organizations

33. Sukhothai Thammathirat Open University
34. Silpakorn University, City Campus
35. St. Francis Xavier School
36. Nonthaburi Provincial Land Office, Pak Kret Branch
37. Wat Phasuk Maneechak
38. Lawn Tennis Association of Thailand
39. Immigration Bureau
40. EGAT Chaeng Watthana Substation
