= Chaeng Watthana 14 MRT station =

Railway station in Bangkok, Thailand

Chaeng Watthana 14 แจ้งวัฒนะ 14
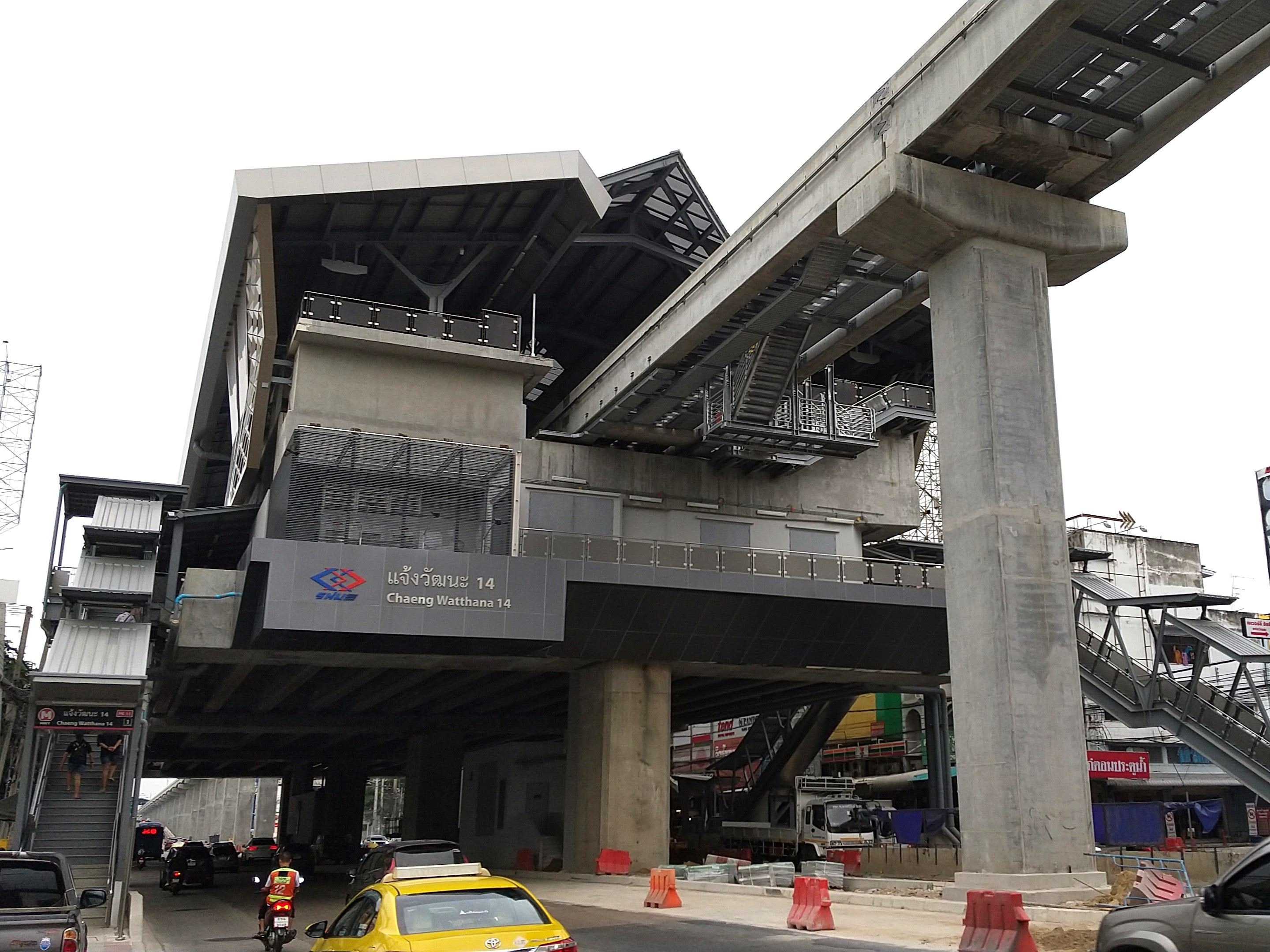

General information
- Location: Lak Si District, Bangkok, Thailand
- System: MRT
- Owner: Mass Rapid Transit Authority of Thailand (MRTA)
- Operator: Northern Bangkok Monorail Company Limited
- Line: Pink Line

Other information
- Station code: PK11

History
- Opened: 21 November 2023

Services
Preceding station	Metropolitan Rapid Transit	Following station
Muang Thong Thani towards Nonthaburi Civic Center	Pink Line	Government Complex towards Min Buri
Location

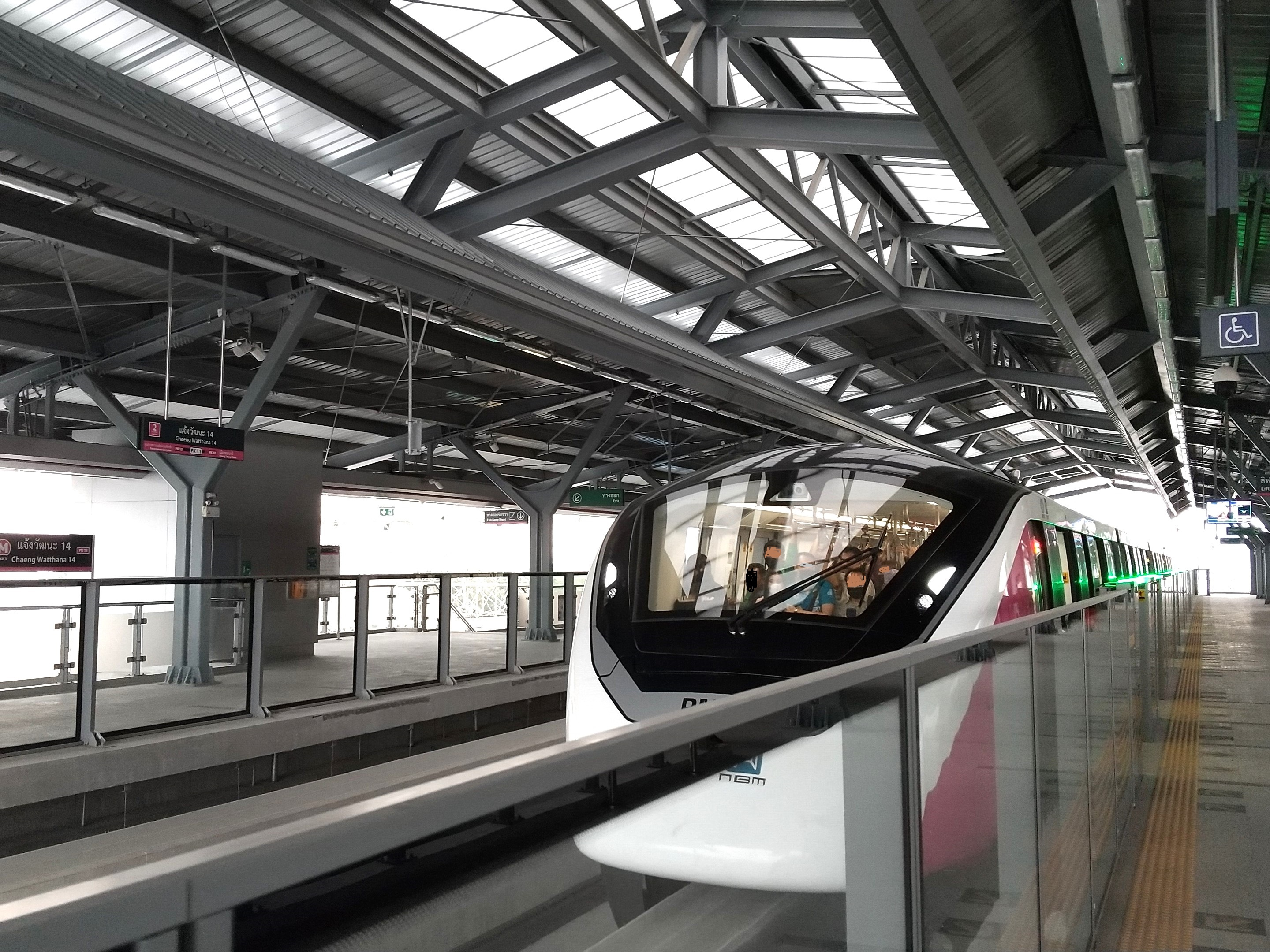
Platforms

Chaeng Watthana 14 station (Thai: สถานีแจ้งวัฒนะ 14) is a Bangkok MRT station on the Pink Line. The station is located on Chaeng Watthana Road, near Soi Chaeng Watthana 14 in Lak Si district, Bangkok. The station has four exits. It opened on 21 November 2023 as part of trial operations on the entire Pink Line.
