= Thunderdome Stadium =

Football stadium in Thailand

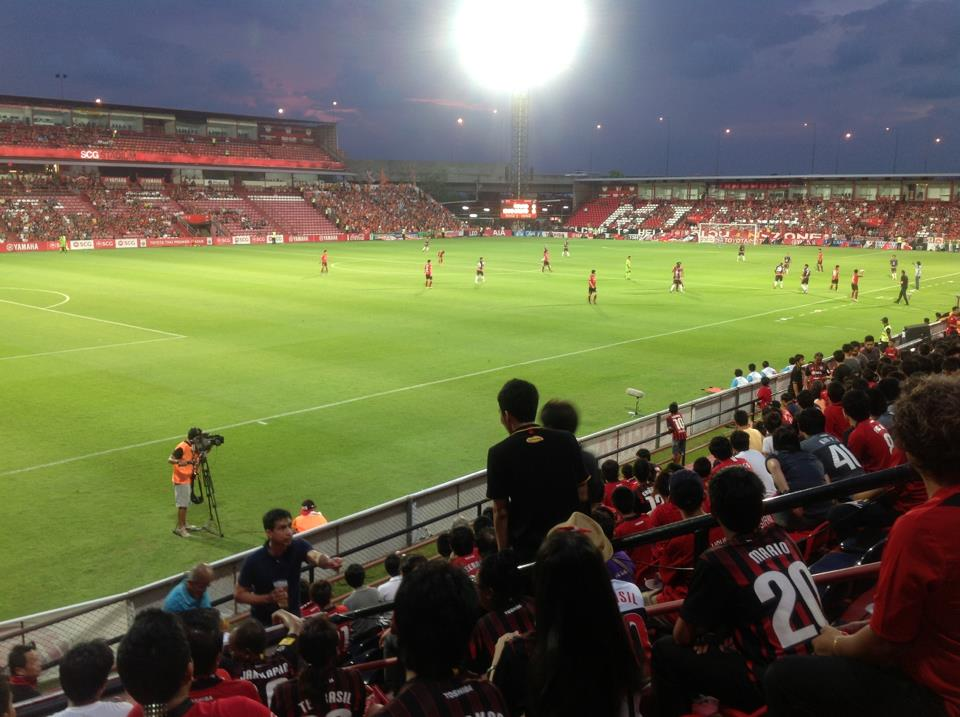
- Thunderdome Stadium in 2013
- Interactive map of Thunderdome Stadium
- Full name: Thunderdome Stadium
- Location: Bang Phut, Pak Kret, Nonthaburi, Thailand
- Coordinates: 13°55′05″N 100°32′51″E
- Owner: Bangkok Land
- Operator: Muangthong United
- Capacity: 15,000
- Surface: Grass
- Public transit: MRT Lake Muang Thong Thani

Construction
- Opened: 1998
- Renovated: 2009

Tenant
- Muangthong United (2007–present)

The Thunderdome Stadium (Thai: ธันเดอร์โดมสเตเดียม) is a football stadium located in Muang Thong Thani, Nonthaburi, Thailand. It is the home of Thai League 1 side Muangthong United. The stadium was the first operate football stadium in Thailand.

== History ==
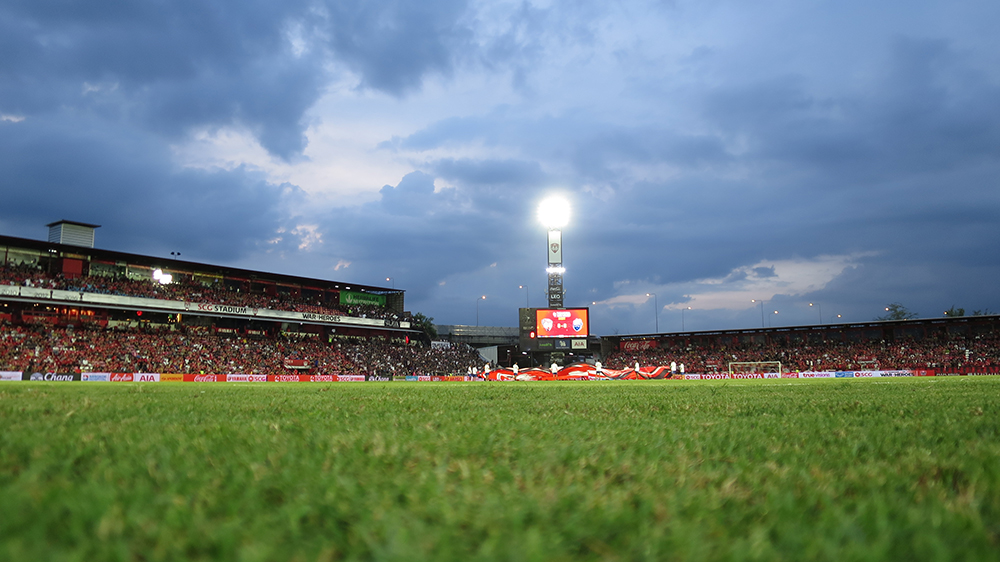
Inside the stadium

Thunderdome Stadium has been the home venue of Muangthong United since 2007. Owned by Bangkok Land and rented by Sports Authority of Thailand, sublease by Muangthong United, the stadium originally known as Thunderdome Sports Complex, it opened in 1998 and had only one main stand before the Thai League 1 promotion in 2009. After the promotion to the top division of Muangthong United, the club started to develop the stadium, construct other temporary stands to hold the demands of the supporter. In 2010, after the club clinched its first ever top division, Thunderdome Stadium was developed into the 4 stands stadium with full installed seats. The capacity rose to 15,000.

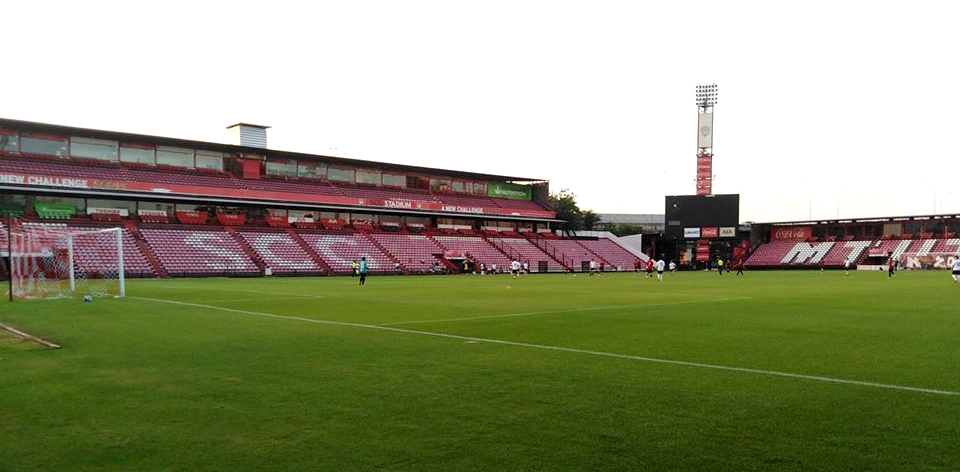
The stadium in 2018

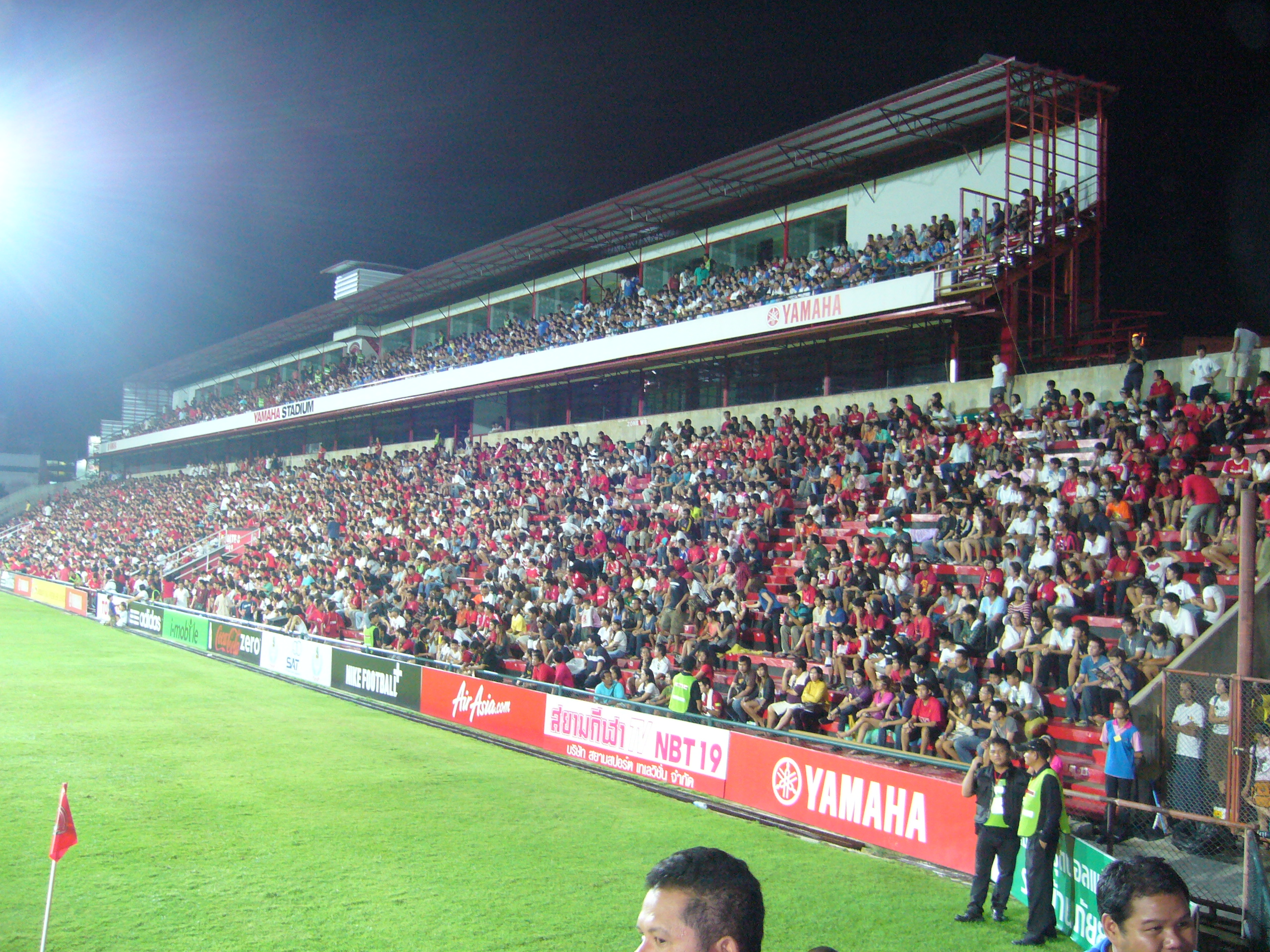
West stand

== Name ==
The name of the ground changed twice due to sponsorship agreements, the first time it was changed from the original name, Thunderdome Stadium, to Yamaha Stadium following the sponsorship in 2010. In 2012, The stadium was changed its alias to SCG Stadium following the club title sponsor of Siam Cement Group (SCG). However, the stadium is still referred as its official name of Thunderdome Stadium in AFC competitions.

In 2020, SCG decided not to renew the contract with the club as the last contract was due to expire in November 2020 and ended 8 years as a main sponsor for the club. In the 2021–22 season, the club decided to change the stadium back to Thunderdome Stadium once again for the first time since 2010.

== Capacity ==
The stadium used to be able to hold as much as 20,000 spectators but the number reduce after renovation by filling in chairs to make the stadium all seated with the capacity of 15,000 people.

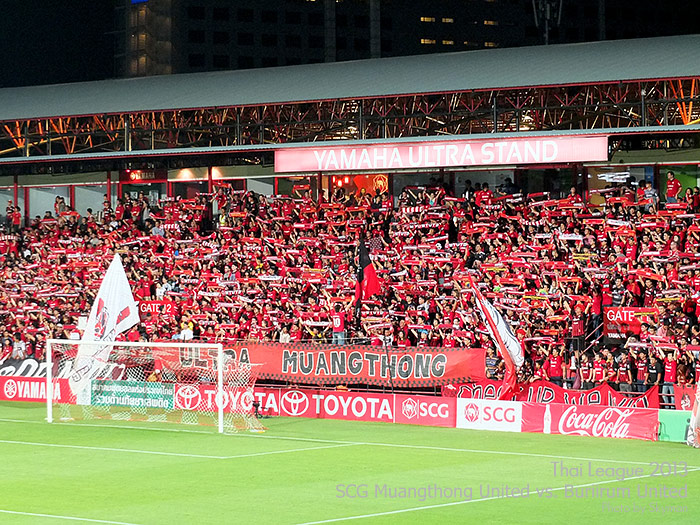
South stand

== Other events ==
On 25 November 2012, K-pop artists under S.M. Entertainment featuring Kangta, BoA, TVXQ, Super Junior, Girls' Generation, SHINee, f(x) and EXO, performed the world tour SMTown Live World Tour III in Bangkok in the stadium.

The stadium hosted Korean Pop Sensation Psy on 28 November 2012.

Clash played their final concert here on 30 April 2014, followed by their disbandment.

Guns N' Roses played here on 28 February 2017 as part of their Not in This Lifetime... Tour.

Fall Out Boy performed in this stadium on 6 December 2023 as part of So Much For (Tour) Dust.

Joker Xue became the first mainland China artist to perform in this stadium as part of his Extraterrestrial World Tour on 21 December 2024.

== International matches ==
Date	Team 1	Score	Team 2	Competition
8 November 2009	Thailand	1–1	Syria	Friendly
11 August 2010	Thailand	1–0	Singapore	Friendly
4 September 2010	Thailand	1–0	India	Friendly
7 November 2012	Thailand	2–0	Malaysia	Friendly
8 October 2017	Thailand	1–0	Kenya	Friendly
