= List of Winner concert tours =

The South Korean group Winner has embarked on seven concert tours and four Fan Meeting events. The group held their first concert tour in Japan on September 11, 2014. In 2018, Winner embarked on their first world tour, Everywhere Tour, in support of their album EVERYD4Y, which marked the first time for the group to tour Asia and North America. Prior to their upcoming group hiatus due to military enlistment, Winner held their second Asia Tour, titled Cross Tour, starting off in Seoul on October 26–27, 2019.

== Tours ==
=== Winner 2014 Zepp Tour in Japan ===
WINNER 2014 Zepp Tour was a debut concert in commemoration of their Japan Debut Album 2014 S/S Japan Collection. The Tour had 11 Dates which started from September 11 to October 11, 2014, and gathered more than 25,000 fans.

Setlist

Act 1 - VCR

1. "Love is a Lie"
2. "Tonight"
3. "Different"

Act 2 - VCR

1. "I'm Him" (Mino solo)
2. "High High" (cover GD & TOP) (Mino and Seunghoon)
3. "Oh Yeah" (cover GD & TOP feat. Bom) (Mino, Seunghoon and Jinwoo)
4. "Confession" (Taehyun solo)
5. "Shiroi Kumo no Youni" (Taehyun and Seungyoon)
6. "LaLaLaLa Love Song" (cover Takuya Kimura)

Act 3 - VCR

1. "Color Ring"
2. "But"
3. "Empty"
4. "Don't Flirt"
5. "Smile Again"

Encore

1. "Just Another Boy"
2. "Love is a Lie"
3. "Smile Again"
4. "Go Up"

Date	City	Country	Venue	Attendance
September 11, 2014	Tokyo	Japan	Zepp Tokyo	25,000
September 23, 2014	Sapporo	Japan	Zepp Sapporo	25,000
September 28, 2014	Fukuoka	Japan	Zepp Fukuoka	25,000
September 30, 2014	Nagoya	Japan	Zepp Nagoya	25,000
October 1, 2014	Nagoya	Japan	Zepp Nagoya	25,000
October 3, 2014	Osaka	Japan	Zepp Namba	25,000
October 4, 2014	Osaka	Japan	Zepp Namba	25,000
October 10, 2014	Tokyo	Japan	Zepp Tokyo	25,000
October 11, 2014 (12:00)	Tokyo	Japan	Zepp Tokyo	25,000
October 11, 2014 (16:00)	Tokyo	Japan	Zepp Tokyo	25,000

=== Winner Japan Tour 2015 ===
Setlist

This set list is representative of their second show in Tokyo, September 9, 2015.

1. "Just Another Boy"
2. "Smile Again"
3. "Empty"
4. "Color Ring"
5. "But"
6. "Confession" (Nam Tae Hyun)
7. "Wild & Young" (Kang Seung Yoon)
8. "Glamorous Sky" (Kang Seung Yoon & Nam Tae Hyun)
9. "I'm Him" (Song Min Ho)
10. "Good Boy (GD＆Taeyang song)" (Lee Seung Hoon & Song Min Ho)
11. "Up (Epik High song)" (Lee Seung Hoon & Song Min Ho & Kim Jin Woo)
12. "Spoiler (Epik High song)" (Lee Seung Hoon & Song Min Ho & Nam Tae Hyun)
13. "Begin" (Kang Seung Yoon & Nam Tae Hyun)
14. "Missing You (2NE1 song)"
15. "Tonight"
16. "Different"
17. "Don't Flirt"
18. "Love Is A Lie"
19. "Go Up"

Encore

1. "Fantastic Baby" (BigBang cover)
2. "Smile Again"
3. "Just Another Boy"

Tour Dates
Date	City	Country	Venue	Attendance
September 6, 2015	Shiga	Japan	Biwako Great Hall	36,000
September 8, 2015	Tokyo	Japan	Nakano Sun Plaza	36,000
September 9, 2015	Tokyo	Japan	Nakano Sun Plaza	36,000
September 12, 2015	Miyagi	Japan	Sendai Izumi Cultural Creation Center	36,000
September 20, 2015	Hiroshima	Japan	Hiroshima Culture Academy HBG Hall	36,000
September 21, 2015	Fukuoka	Japan	Fukuoka Sun Palace Hotel & Hall	36,000
September 23, 2015	Hyogo	Japan	Kobe Culture Hall	36,000
September 27, 2015	Kanagawa	Japan	Kanagawa Prefecture People's Hall	36,000
October 9, 2015	Aichi	Japan	Aichi Prefectural Theater Great Hall	36,000
October 12, 2015	Osaka	Japan	Osaka International Conventional Center Main Hall	36,000
October 25, 2015	Hokkaido	Japan	Nitori Culture Hall	36,000

=== Winner 2016 EXIT Tour ===
EXIT Tour is Winner's first-ever concert tour nationwide following their first EP titled EXIT : E, kicking of the first stop in Seoul on March 12–13, 2016. They also held additional stops in Gwangju, Daegu, and Busan in April. In June, the group brought their Exit Tour to Japan, drawing over 36,000 fans in Japan alone.

Date	City	Country	Venue	Attendance
March 12, 2016	Seoul	South Korea	Olympic Gymnastics Arena	33,000
March 13, 2016	Seoul	South Korea	Olympic Gymnastics Arena	33,000
March 26, 2016	Gwangju	South Korea	KimDaejung Convention Center	33,000
April 2, 2016	Daegu	South Korea	Daegu Exco	33,000
April 23, 2016	Busan	South Korea	Busan KBS Hall	33,000
June 18, 2016	Chiba	Japan	Makuhari Messe	36,000
June 19, 2016	Chiba	Japan	Makuhari Messe	36,000
June 25, 2016	Fukuoka	Japan	Fukuoka Sun Palace Hotel & Hall	36,000
June 26, 2016	Fukuoka	Japan	Fukuoka Sun Palace Hotel & Hall	36,000
July 2, 2016	Nagoya	Japan	Nagoya Congress Center	36,000
July 3, 2016	Nagoya	Japan	Nagoya Congress Center	36,000
July 16, 2016	Kobe	Japan	World Memorial Hall	36,000
July 17, 2016	Kobe	Japan	World Memorial Hall	36,000
July 18, 2016	Kobe	Japan	World Memorial Hall	36,000
Total				69,000

=== Winner Japan Tour 2018 ~We’ll always be young~ ===
Date	City	Country	Venue	Attendance
February 10, 2018; Two shows	Chiba	Japan	Ichiharashi City Hall	34,000
February 12, 2018; Two shows	Osaka	Japan	Festival Hall	34,000
February 25, 2018	Kobe	Japan	Kobe International House	34,000
March 10, 2018	Kawasaki	Japan	Kawasaki City Sports and Cultural Research Center	34,000
March 11, 2018; Two shows	Kawasaki	Japan	Kawasaki City Sports and Cultural Research Center	34,000
March 21, 2018	Fukuoka	Japan	Fukuoka Civic Hall	34,000
March 31, 2018	Nagoya	Japan	Nagoya Congress Center	34,000
April 28, 2018	Tokyo	Japan	Nippon Budokan	34,000

=== Winner Everywhere Tour ===
Everywhere Tour is Winner's first-ever world concert tour, following their second studio album, EVERYD4Y. The world tour commenced with an opening show in Seoul on August 19, 2018. On November 5, 2018, YG Entertainment confirmed that Winner will be holding an Encore Concert on January 5, 2019, in Seoul. Following the news, on November 14, 2018, it was also announced that they will also start their first-ever tour in North America, held in 7 cities during January 15–29, 2020.

Setlist of First Show in Seoul

Opening VCR

- "Empty"
- "Hello"
- "Island"
- "Really Really"
- "Let's Go On Vacation" (Cover)
- "Body" (Mino)
- "Turn Off The Light" (Mino)
- "Untitled" (Jinu cover)
- "It Rains" (YYoon)
- "Instinctively" (Yoon cover)
- "Ringa Linga" (Hoony)
- "Serenade" (Hoony)
- "We Were"
- "For"
- "Raining"
- "Movie Star"

VCR

- "Immature"
- "Air"
- "Love Me Love Me"
- "Everyday"
- "LA LA"

Encore

- "Don't Flirt"
- "Luxury"
- "Special Night"
- "Really Really"
- "Everyday (remix)"
Setlist of Leg One

This set list is representative of their show in Jakarta, November 17, 2018.

Opening VCR

- "Empty"
- "Air"
- "Hello"
- "Everyday"
- "Body" (Mino)
- "Turn Off The Light" (Mino)
- "Untitled" (Jinu cover)
- "It Rains" (Yoon)
- "History" (Yoon cover)
- "Instinctively" (Yoon cover)
- "Ringa Linga" (Hoony)
- "Serenade" (Hoony)
- "We Were"
- "For"
- "Raining"
- "Movie Star"

VCR

- "Immature"
- "Love Me Love Me"
- "Special Night"
- "Island"
- "LA LA"

Encore

- "Don't Flirt"
- "Luxury"
- "Really Really"
- "Everyday (remix)"
Setlist of Seoul Encore Concert

Opening VCR

- "Really Really"
- "Hello"
- "Air"
- "Everyday"

VCR

- "Trigger" (Mino)
- "Fiance" (Mino)
- "Untitled" (Jinu cover)
- "It Rains" (Yoon)
- "Everyone" (Yoon cover)
- "Instinctively" (Yoon cover)
- "Ringa Linga" (Hoony cover)
- "Serenade" (Hoony)
- "We Were"
- "For"
- "Raining"
- "Empty"
- "Movie Star"

VCR

- "Immature"
- "Millions"
- "Special Night"
- "Island"
- "Love Me Love Me"
- "LA LA"

Encore

- "Don't Flirt"
- "Luxury"
- "First Love" (Cover)
- "Really Really"
- "Everyday (remix)"
- "Go Up"
Setlist of Leg Two

This set list is representative of their show in Los Angeles, January 20, 2019.

Opening VCR

- "Really Really"
- "Hello"
- "Air"
- "Everyday"
- "Trigger" (Mino)
- "Fiance" (Mino)
- "Untitled" (Jinu cover)
- "It Rains" (Yoon)
- "Youth" (Yoon cover)
- "Instinctively" (Yoon cover)
- "Ringa Linga" (Hoony cover)
- "Serenade" (Hoony)
- "We Were"
- "For"
- "Raining"
- "Empty"
- "Movie Star"
- "Immature"
- "Millions"
- "Special Night"
- "Island"
- "Love Me Love Me"
- "LA LA"

Encore

- "Don't Flirt"
- "Luxury"
- "Really Really"
- "Everyday"

Date	City	Country	Venue	Attendance
Leg One: Asia
August 19, 2018	Seoul	South Korea	KSPO Dome	—N/a
September 8, 2018 (2 shows)	Osaka	Japan	Orix Theater	—N/a
September 9, 2018	Osaka	Japan	Orix Theater	—N/a
September 15, 2018	Sendai	Japan	Sendai Sun Plaza	—N/a
September 17, 2018	Kurashiki	Japan	Kurashiki City Auditorium	—N/a
September 23, 2018	Taipei	Taiwan	NTSU Arena	4,500
September 29, 2018	Nagasaki	Japan	Nagasaki Brick Hall	—N/a
September 30, 2018	Kagoshima	Japan	Houzan Hall	—N/a
October 2, 2018	Fukuoka	Japan	Fukuoka Civic Hall	—N/a
October 3, 2018	Fukuoka	Japan	Fukuoka Civic Hall	—N/a
October 5, 2018	Shizuoka	Japan	Shizuoka City Culture Hall	—N/a
October 6, 2018 (2 shows)	Nagoya	Japan	NTK Hall	—N/a
October 8, 2018 (2 shows)	Yokohama	Japan	Pacifico Yokohama	—N/a
October 14, 2018	Kuala Lumpur	Malaysia	Malawati Indoor Stadium	6,500
October 21, 2018	Bangkok	Thailand	Thunder Dome	5,000
November 3, 2018	Singapore	Singapore	The MAX Pavilion	4,200
November 10, 2018	Pasay	Philippines	Mall of Asia Arena	—N/a
November 17, 2018	Jakarta	Indonesia	Tennis Indoor Senayan	—N/a
November 24, 2018	Hong Kong	China	AsiaWorld–Arena	—N/a
Seoul Encore
January 5, 2019	Seoul	South Korea	KSPO Dome	—N/a
Leg Two: North America
January 15, 2019	Seattle	United States	Paramount Theater	—N/a
January 18, 2019	San Francisco	United States	The Masonic	—N/a
January 20, 2019	Los Angeles	United States	Hollywood Palladium	—N/a
January 22, 2019	Dallas	United States	Toyota Music Factory	—N/a
January 24, 2019	Chicago	United States	Rosemont Theatre	—N/a
January 27, 2019	Toronto	Canada	Sony Centre for the Performing Arts	—N/a
January 29, 2019	New York	United States	Hulu Theater	—N/a

=== Winner Japan Tour 2019 ===
Date	City	Country	Venue	Attendance
July 3, 2019	Tokyo	Japan	Nakano Sun Plaza	TBA
July 15, 2019	Osaka	Japan	Osaka Castle Hall	TBA
July 17, 2019	Nagoya	Japan	Nagoya Congress Center	TBA
July 28, 2019	Chiba	Japan	Makuhari Messe	10,000
August 10, 2019	Tokyo	Japan	Olympus Hall Hachioji	TBA
August 31, 2019	Shizuoka	Japan	Shizuoka City Community Hall	TBA
September 1, 2019	Aichi	Japan	Nagoya Civil Hall	TBA
September 14, 2019	Kyoto	Japan	ROHM Theatre	TBA
September 16, 2019	Fukuoka	Japan	Marine Messe	TBA
Total				50,000

=== Winner Cross Tour ===
Cross Tour is Winner's second world concert tour, which was supposed to be held in 9 cities across Asia, including the Opening Act and Encore in South Korea. However, the final stop in Singapore and Encore in Seoul was cancelled due to the COVID-19 pandemic, hence only 11 shows was successfully held. The series of events led to the group holding a free online live concert entitled "Winner Cross Special Live" through Naver V Live on February 14, 2020, where they performed live singing and dancing for 2 hours, garnering almost 1 million attendees.

Setlist of First Show in Seoul

Day 1: October 26, 2019

Opening

- "Everyday"
- "Love Me Love Me"
- "OMG"
- "Really Really"

VCR 1

- "Mola"
- "Special Night"
- "Soso"
- "Dress Up"
- "Different"
- "Have A Good Day"
- "Raining"
- "Empty"
- "Boom"

Band Performance

- "Flamenco" (Hoony)
- "Serenade" (Hoony)
- "Call Anytime (feat. Mino)" (Jinu)
- "Instinctively" (cover Yoon)
- "Wind" (Yoon)
- "Trigger" (Mino)
- "Body" (Mino)
- "Fiancé" (Mino)
- "Movie Star"

VCR 2

- "Don't Stop The Music" (Team A Dance from survival program WIN:WHO IS NEXT)
- "Island"
- "Millions"
- "Ah Yeah"
- "Immature"
- "LA LA"
- "Luxury"
- "Smile Again"

Encore

- "Really Really"
- "LA LA "
- "Everyday (remix)"

Day 2: October 27, 2019

Opening

- "Everyday"
- "Love Me Love Me"
- "Boom"
- "Really Really"

VCR 1

- "Air"
- "Hello"
- "Soso"
- "Don't Be Shy"
- "First Love"
- "Color Ring" & "Fool" (medley)
- "OMG"
- "Empty"

Band Performance

- "Flamenco" (Hoony)
- "Serenade" (Hoony)
- "Call Anytime (feat. Mino)" (Jinu)
- "Instinctively" (cover Yoon)
- "Wind" (Yoon)
- "I'm Him" (Mino)
- "Rocket" (Mino)
- "Fiancé" (Mino)
- "Fear" (Mino)
- "Movie Star"

VCR 2

- "Don't Stop The Music" (Team A Dance from survival program WIN:WHO IS NEXT)
- "Island"
- "Millions"
- "Ah Yeah"
- "Immature"
- "LA LA"
- "Don't Flirt"
- "Smile Again"

Encore

- "Really Really"
- "LA LA "
- "Everyday (remix)"
- "We Were"
- "Ah Yeah"
- "Millions"
Setlist of Asia Tour

This set list is representative of their show in Taipei, November 24, 2019.

Opening

- "Everyday"
- "Love Me Love Me"
- "Island"
- "Really Really"

VCR 1

- "Mola"
- "Dress Up"
- "Different"
- "Have A Good Day"
- "Raining"
- "OMG"
- "Empty"

Band Performance

- "Flamenco" (Hoony)
- "Serenade" (Hoony)
- "Call Anytime (feat. Mino)" (Jinu)
- "Instinctively" (cover Yoon)
- "Wind" (Yoon)
- "I'm Him" (Mino)
- "Trigger" (Mino)
- "Fiancé" (Mino)
- "Movie Star"

VCR 2

- "Soso"
- "Don't Be Shy"
- "Millions"
- "Ah Yeah"
- "Immature"
- "LA LA"

Encore

- "Hello"
- "Zoo"
- "Really Really"
- "LA LA"
- "Everyday (remix)"

Date	City	Country	Venue	Attendance
October 26, 2019	Seoul	South Korea	KSPO Dome	TBA
October 27, 2019	Seoul	South Korea	KSPO Dome	TBA
November 24, 2019	Taipei	Taiwan	NTSU Arena (Linkou Arena)	TBA
December 21, 2019	Jakarta	Indonesia	Tennis Indoor Senayan	TBA
December 28, 2019	Macao	China	Studio City Event Center	TBA
December 29, 2019	Macao	China	Studio City Event Center	TBA
January 11, 2020	Bangkok	Thailand	Thunder Dome, Muang Thong Thani	TBA
January 12, 2020	Bangkok	Thailand	Thunder Dome, Muang Thong Thani	TBA
January 18, 2020	Kuala Lumpur	Malaysia	Axiata Arena	TBA
January 25, 2020	Manila	Philippines	Mall Of Asia Arena	TBA
February 1, 2020	Ho Chi Minh City	Vietnam	Saigon Exhibition and Convention Centre	TBA
February 8, 2020	Singapore	Singapore	The Star Performing Arts Centre	Cancelled
Encore
February 14, 2020	Seoul	South Korea	Kyung Hee University Grand Peace Palace	Cancelled
February 15, 2020	Seoul	South Korea	Kyung Hee University Grand Peace Palace	Cancelled

=== Winner 2022 Concert: The Circle ===
The Circle is Winner's first full-group concert after their 2-year hiatus, following Jinwoo and Seunghoon's military discharge in January 2022. The event was held on April 30 and May 1, 2022, at the Olympic Park Olympic Hall, Seoul. While the April 30 event was only run in person, the concert on May 1 was also available for online streaming.

Setlist

Day 1: April 30, 2022

Opening

- "Really Really"
- "Everyday"
- "Love Me Love Me"
- "Hold"
- "Mola"
- "Special Night"
- "Dress Up"

VCR 1

- "Remember"
- "Fool"
- "Different"
- "So So"
- "OMG"
- "Boom"

VCR 2

- "Call Anytime (feat. Mino)" (Jinu)
- "Dduk" (Jinu)
- "Born To Love You" (Yoon)
- "Instinctively" (cover Yoon)
- "Flamenco" (Hoony)
- "Serenade" (Hoony)
- "Trigger" (Mino)
- "Fiancé" (Mino)
- "Tang!" (Mino)

Band Performance

- "We Were"
- "Raining"
- "Don't Be Shy"
- "Well"
- "Island"
- "Millions"
- "Ah Yeah"
- "Empty"
- "Movie Star"

Encore

- "Don't Flirt"
- "Just Dance"
- "Go Up"
- "Really Really"
- "LA LA "
- "Everyday (remix)"

Day 2: May 1, 2022

Opening

- "Really Really"
- "Everyday"
- "Love Me Love Me"
- "Hold"
- "Mola"
- "Special Night"
- "Dress Up"

VCR 1

- "Remember"
- "Fool"
- "Different"
- "So So"
- "OMG"
- "Boom"

VCR 2

- "Call Anytime (feat. Mino)" (Jinu)
- "Dduk" (Jinu)
- "Born To Love You" (Yoon)
- "Instinctively" (cover Yoon)
- "Flamenco" (Hoony)
- "Serenade" (Hoony)
- "Trigger" (Mino)
- "Fiancé" (Mino)
- "Tang!" (Mino)

Band Performance

- "We Were"
- "Raining"
- "Don't Be Shy"
- "Well"
- "Island"
- "Millions"
- "Ah Yeah"
- "Empty"
- "Movie Star"

Encore

- "Don't Flirt"
- "Just Dance"
- "First Love" (Cover)
- "Really Really"
- "LA LA "
- "Everyday (remix)"

Date	City	Country	Venue	Attendance
April 30, 2022	Seoul	South Korea	Olympic Park Olympic Hall	TBA
May 1, 2022	Seoul	South Korea	Olympic Park Olympic Hall	TBA

=== 2025 WINNER CONCERT [IN OUR CIRCLE] ===
Date	City	Country	Venue	Attendance
July 26, 2025	Seoul	South Korea	Olympic Park Olympic Hall	TBA
July 27, 2025	Seoul	South Korea	Olympic Park Olympic Hall	TBA
