= Si Rat MRT station =

Metro station in Nonthaburi, Thailand

Si Rat ศรีรัช
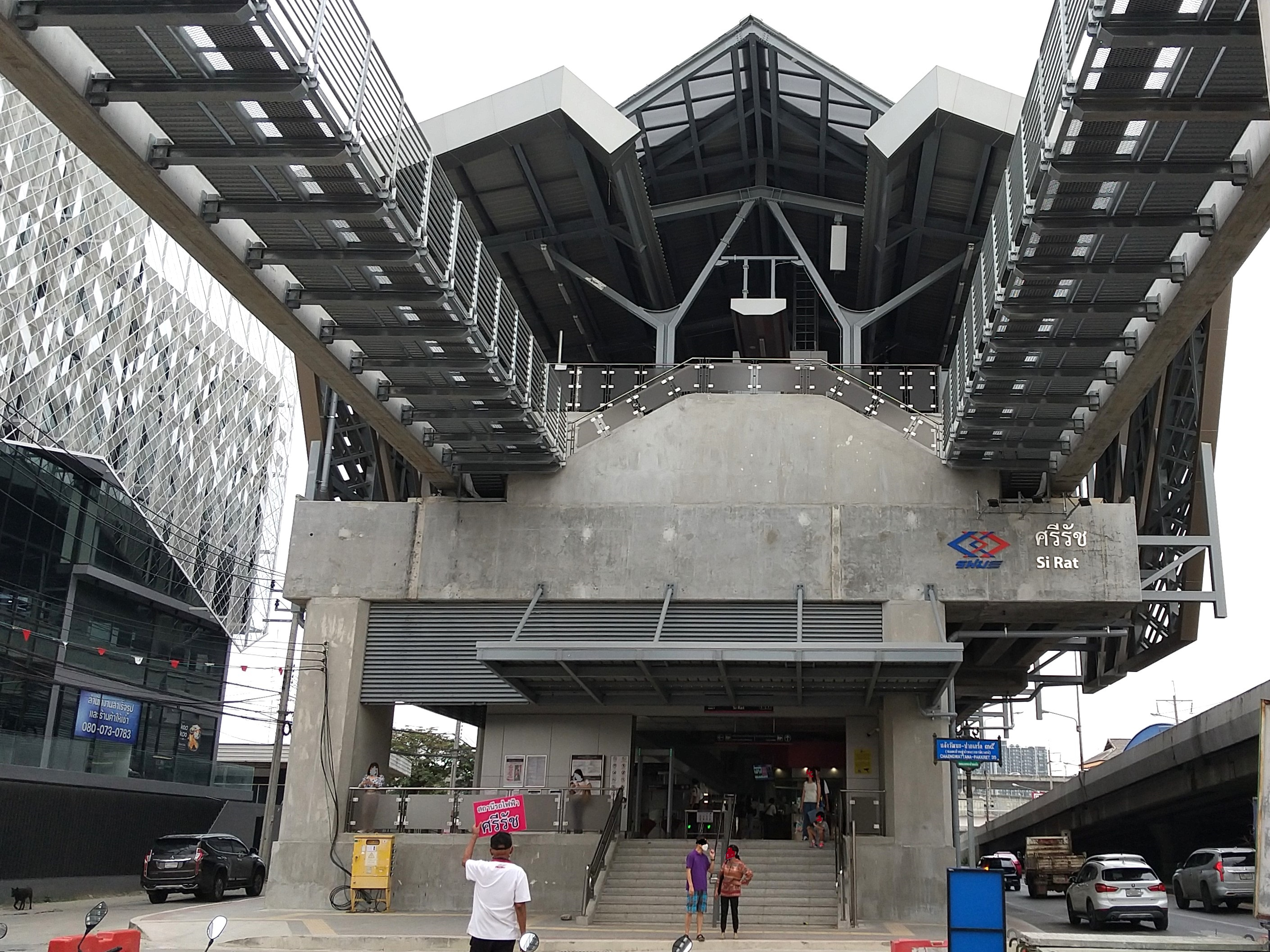

General information
- Location: Pak Kret District, Nonthaburi province, Thailand
- Coordinates: 13.9006°N 100.5400°E
- System: MRT
- Owner: Mass Rapid Transit Authority of Thailand (MRTA)
- Operator: Northern Bangkok Monorail Company Limited
- Line: Pink Line

Other information
- Station code: PK09

History
- Opened: 21 November 2023

Services
Preceding station	Metropolitan Rapid Transit	Following station
Chaeng Watthana - Pak Kret 28 towards Nonthaburi Civic Center	Pink Line	Muang Thong Thani towards Min Buri
Location

Si Rat station (Thai: สถานีศรีรัช) is a Bangkok MRT station on the Pink Line. The station is located on Chaeng Watthana Road, near Si Rat Expressway in Pak Kret district, Nonthaburi province. The station has four exits and is the closest station to Sukhothai Thammathirat Open University. It opened on 21 November 2023 as part of trial operations on the entire Pink Line. It is one of three stations on the line with an island platform.

== Naming ==
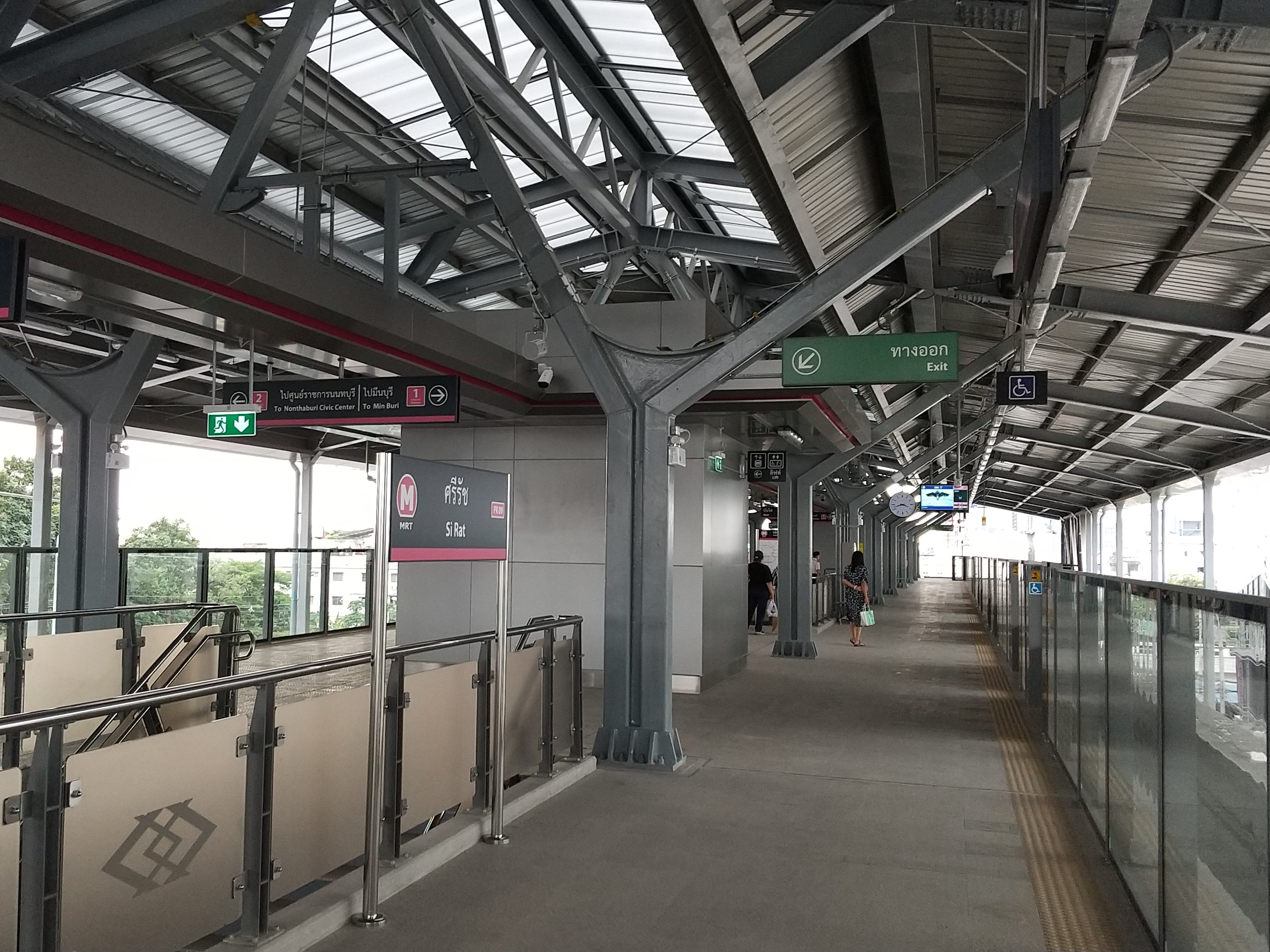
Platforms

The station was initially named "Muang Thong Thani" while the current Muang Thong Thani station was named "Si Rat", but the names were swapped to accommodate and prevent confusion for which station to change at for the Muang Thong Thani spur line. The station was then renamed to "Sukhothai Thammathirat University" station but due to its distant location from the university, it did not meet the Department of Railways' guidelines for station naming by proximity and therefore was changed to the current "Si Rat" name.
