= Kanjanapas family =

Thai business family of Teochew origin

Kanjanapas กาญจนพาสน์ Sae-ung
- Parent family: Huang family
- Current region: Bangkok
- Origin: Bangkok, Thailand
- Founded: 20th century
- Founder: Mongkol Kanjanapas
- Current head: Peter Kanjanapas

The Kanjanapas family (Thai: กาญจนพาสน์) is a Thai business family of Teochew Chinese origin, belonging to the Huang/Wong (黃) clan. It owns businesses in Hong Kong and Thailand, including Stelux Holdings, Bangkok Land and BTS Group Holdings.

The family was founded by Mongkol Kanjanapas (Thai: มงคล กาญจนพาสน์) or Wong Chue Meng (Chinese: 黃子明; 1919–2003), who was born in Bangkok to an immigrant Chinese father. He did business in Thailand, and was a shareholder in Siam City Bank, before moving to Hong Kong. There, in 1963, he founded Stelux Holdings, whose business grew from producing Seiko watches.

Mongkol had eleven children, including sons Anant (1941–2020) and Keeree (born 1950). Most of the family settled in Hong Kong under the name Wong, though Anant and Keeree moved back to Thailand during the 1980s–1990s for business opportunities. Anant headed real estate developer Bangkok Land, while Keeree led Tanayong (later known as BTS Group Holdings, BTSG), the developer of Bangkok's first mass transit system, the BTS Skytrain. Both companies suffered heavy losses from the 1997 Asian financial crisis, but the family managed to retain the businesses. Today, Anant's sons Paul and Peter serve as vice chairs in Bangkok Land, while Keeree's son Kavin took over as CEO of BTSG in 2015.

== Notable members ==
- Keeree Kanjanapas
- Anant Kanjanapas
