= Impact Muang Thong Thani MRT station =

Monorail line in Greater Bangkok

Impact Muang Thong Thani อิมแพคเมืองทองธานี
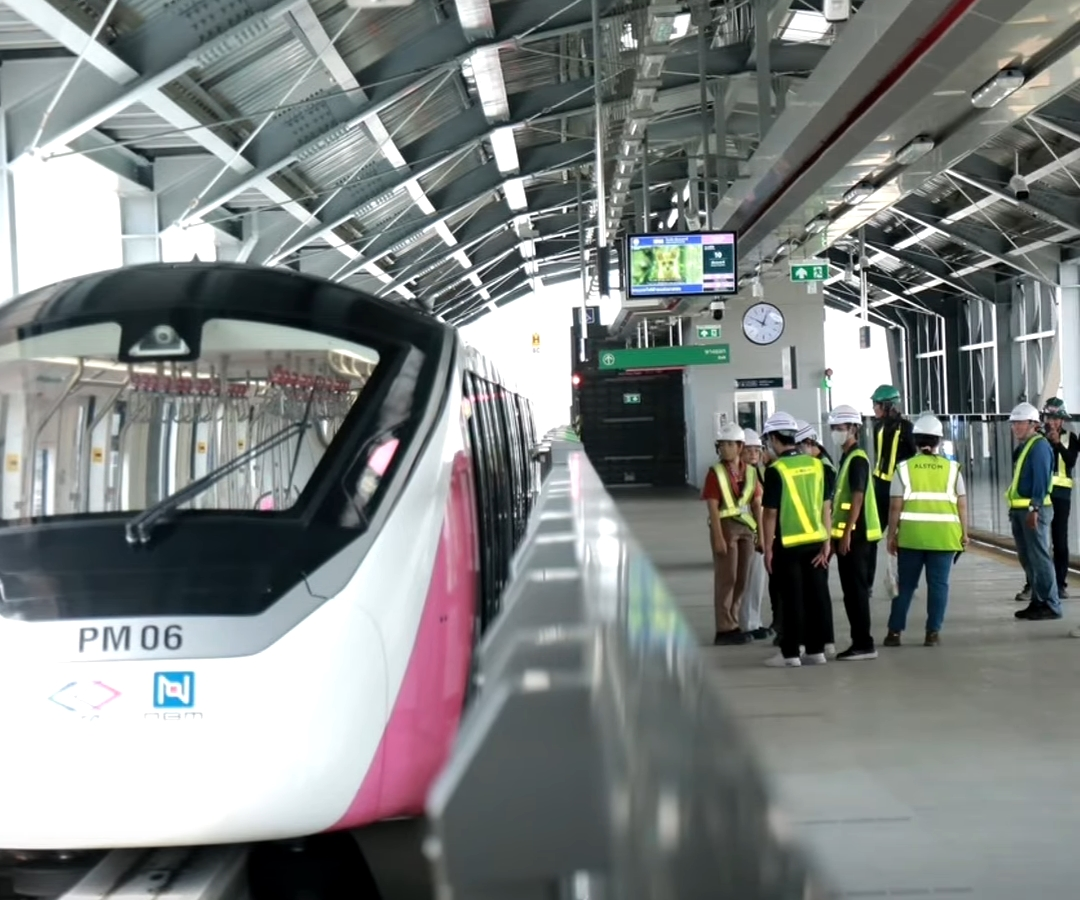
- Pink Line station

General information
- Location: Pak Kret, Nonthaburi, Thailand
- Coordinates: 13.9104°N 100.5443°E
- System: MRT
- Owner: Mass Rapid Transit Authority of Thailand (MRTA)
- Operator: Northern Bangkok Monorail Company Limited
- Line: Pink Line

Other information
- Station code: MT01

History
- Opened: 20 May 2025
Location

Impact Muang Thong Thani station (Note: Thai: สถานีอิมแพคเมืองทองธานี) (station code MT01) is a Bangkok MRT station on the Pink Line extension to Muang Thong Thani, commonly known as Muang Thong Thani Line. It mainly serves Impact, Muang Thong Thani, to which the station is connected via a skybridge; Sukhothai Thammathirat Open University; as well as the surrounding area. The Station has 4 exits.

== History ==
Construction of the station (along with the rest of the extension), which was wholly funded by Northern Bangkok Monorail, the construction and operation concessionaire for the main Pink Line, began in June 2022. It opened to the public for a trial run on 20 May 2025, with full commercial service expected to begin on 17 June 2025."
