= Impact, Muang Thong Thani =

Commercial complex in Pak Kret, Thailand

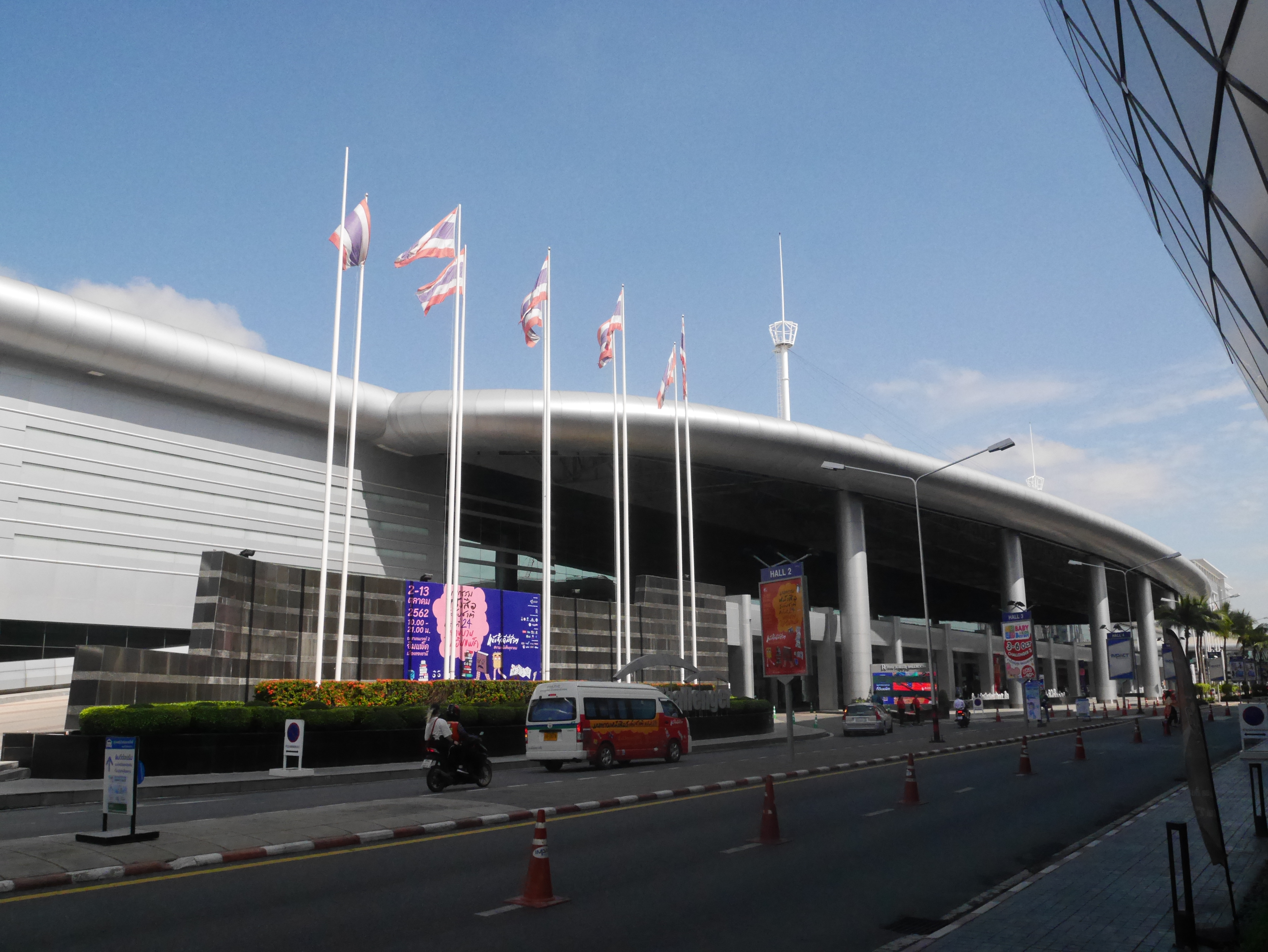
- View of the Impact Challenger Hall, with the Exhibition Center further along the street
- Address: Popular 3 Road, Ban Mai, Pak Kret, Nonthaburi 11120, Thailand
- Location: Muang Thong Thani
- Coordinates: 13.9130°N 100.5478°E
- Operator: Impact Exhibition Management Co., Ltd.
- Public transit: MRT Impact Muang Thong Thani

Construction
- Built: 1996

Website
- Venue website

Impact, Muang Thong Thani (Thai: ศูนย์แสดงสินค้าและการประชุม อิมแพ็ค เมืองทองธานี) is a commercial complex consisting of the Impact Arena, a convention centre, and exhibition halls, located in Muang Thong Thani in Pak Kret District of Nonthaburi Province, a northern suburb of Bangkok, Thailand.

It has been considered as the second largest exhibition and convention venue in Asia with an indoor floor space of over 140,000 m^{2}. Its Challenger Hall is currently the world's largest column-free exhibition hall. The venue hosts over 490 events and welcomes over 15 million visitors each year.

== History ==
Impact, Muang Thong Thani originated as the Muang Thong Thani Sports Complex, built for the 1998 Asian Games by real estate developer Bangkok Land. Bangkok Land is the developer of Muang Thong Thani, a real estate development envisioned in 1989 as a satellite city of Bangkok. It grew rapidly among Thailand's economic boom of the early 1990s, but became ruined financially when the bubble burst in the lead-up to the 1997 Asian financial crisis.

Bangkok Land had been selected as a venue for the games before the crisis, and there were concerns whether it would be able to finish the construction on time. It was completed less than a month before the games began in December 1998. The Muang Thong Thani Sports Complex hosted boxing, weightlifting, billiards & snooker, gymnastics, volleyball, tennis and rugby competitions.

Following the conclusion of the games, Bangkok Land redeveloped part of the sports complex as a convention and exhibition center, renaming it the Impact Exhibition Center in 1999. At the time, the entire venue comprised what is now Impact Arena and the first four halls of Impact Exhibition Center. The weightlifting and rugby venues, now Thunder Dome and Thunderdome Stadium, had their ownership contractually transferred to the Sports Authority of Thailand.

The Impact Convention Center was built in 2000, while the expansion of IMPACT Exhibition Center was completed in 2003. The column-free Impact Challenger exhibition halls were completed in early 2006. Spanning 60,000 sqm, the Impact Challenger Halls are presently the world's biggest column-free exhibition halls.

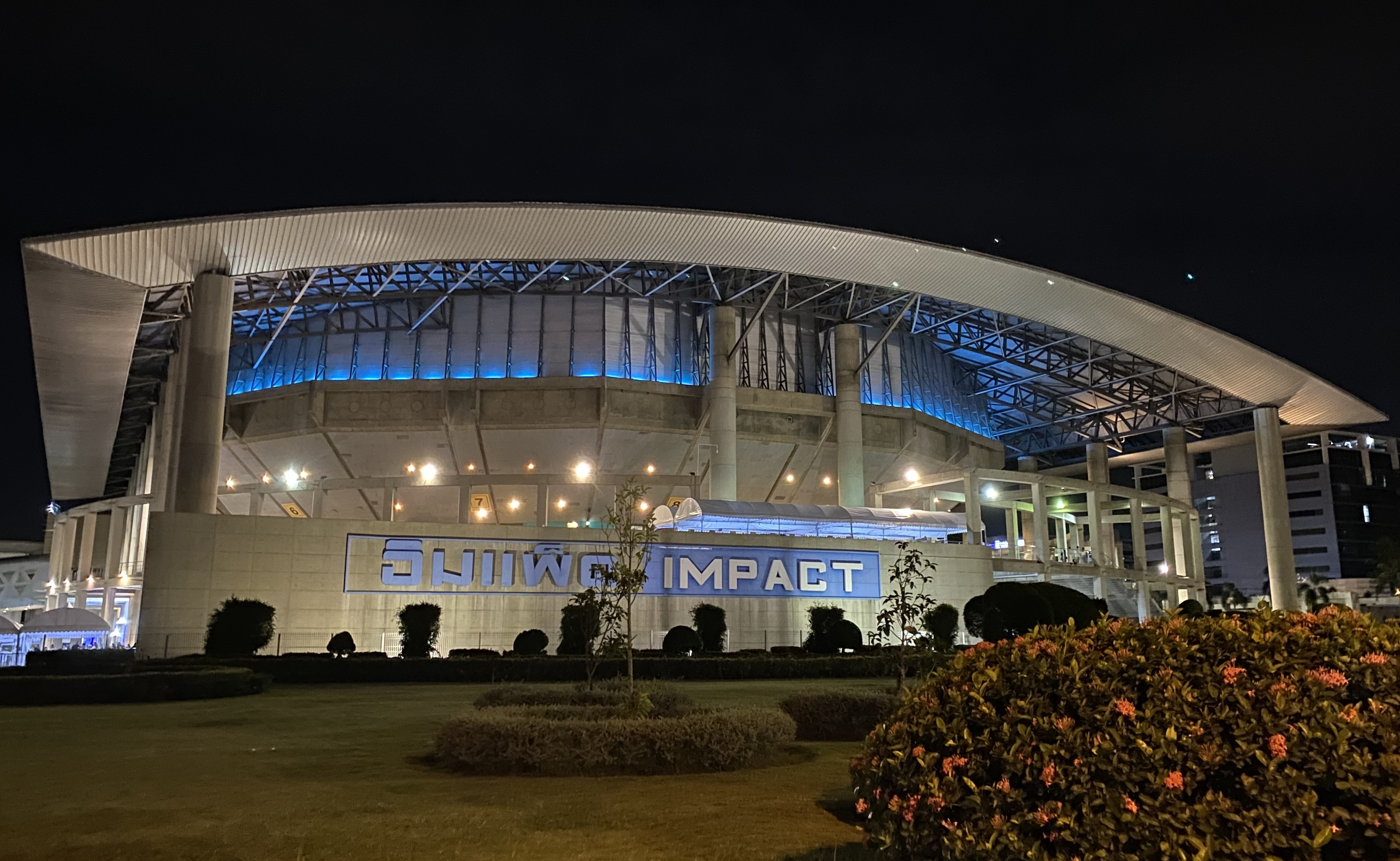
The Impact Arena in 2023

The Miss Universe 2005 and Miss Universe 2018 beauty pageants were held at the Impact Arena. It was originally scheduled to host the Miss Earth 2011 but was relocated back to the Philippines because of the 2011 Thailand floods.

The Impact Arena hosted five ONE Championship mixed martial arts events from 2016 to 2018. It also hosted 2018 Thomas & Uber Cup badminton tournament, which is also the first time Thailand hosted a major badminton event since 1976 Thomas Cup.

The Impact Challenger is set to host the 2025 Miss Universe Pageant on November 21st (Thailand), November 20th (USA). This will be the 3rd time Impact, Muang Thong Thani, will host the pageant.

== Facilities ==
Name	Description	Capacity
Impact Challenger (Hall 1–3)	Column free exhibition hall	Challenger Hall : 14,000 - 20,000 per hall Royal Jubilee Ballroom: 3,500 (reception), 2,000 (banquet)
Impact Exhibition Center (Hall 5–13)	Multi-purpose exhibition halls	—N/a
Impact Forum (Hall 4)	Convention Center	Grand Diamond Ballroom: 2,160; Banquet Hall: 2,891
Impact Arena	Multi-purpose indoor arena	Arena mode: 11,440; Theatre mode: 3,580
Impact Lakeside	Outdoor events venue	—N/a
Impact Lakefront	Outdoor retail center and events venue	—N/a
Impact Speedpark	Outdoor go-kart racing	—N/a
Impact Sports Club	Fitness center and tennis training facility	—N/a
Beehive Lifestyle Mall	Shopping center	—N/a
Cosmo Bazaar	Shopping center	—N/a
Outlet Square	Outlet mall	—N/a
Cosmo Office Park	Commercial and office property	—N/a
Novotel Bangkok Impact	380-room 4-star hotel, managed by AccorHotels	—N/a
Ibis Bangkok Impact	587-room 3-star hotel, managed by AccorHotels	TASTE: 100
Portal Lifestyle Complex	Shopping center	Portal Ballroom: 1,120
AKTIV Square	Outdoor events venue	20,000
Thunder Dome	Indoor music venue	3,500
Thunderdome Stadium	Outdoor sports stadium	15,000

== Entertainment events ==
IMPACT the busiest entertainment venue in Thailand for many regional and international artists over the years when they perform in Thailand, spanning a wide range of musical genres.

Events from local artists
Events from Asian and regional artists
Events from international artists

Entertainment events held at Impact Muang Thong Thani
1996
November 5	Michael Jackson	HIStory World Tour
2002
April 10	Roger Waters	In The Flesh Tour
August 2	Pet Shop Boys	Release Tour
December 10	Red Hot Chili Peppers	By the Way World Tour
2003
March 12	Cliff Richard	Wanted World Tour
July 29	Coldplay	A Rush of Blood to the Head Tour
2004
February 17	Mariah Carey	Charmbracelet World Tour
July 19	Whitney Houston	Soul Divas Tour
September 10	Scorpions	Unbreakable World Tour
2005
March 27	Avril Lavigne	Bonez Tour
May 31	Miss Universe 2005	Miss Universe 2005
May 14	Bodyslam	Bodyslam Believe Concert
July 16–17	Tata Young	Dhoom Dhoom Tour
October 9	Bodyslam & Big Ass	Big Body Concert
2006
January 22	Backstreet Boys	Never Gone Tour
February 19	Snow Patrol	Eyes Open Tour
July 31	Black Eyed Peas	Monkey Business Tour
2007
February 7	Cliff Richard	The Here and Now Tour
June 28	Christina Aguilera	Back to Basics Tour
August 19	Gwen Stefani	Sweet Escape Tour
October 18	Black Eyed Peas	Black Blue & You Tour
October 30	Beyoncé	The Beyoncé Experience
December 15–16	TVXQ	O: The 2nd Asia Tour
2008
March 3	Maroon 5	It Won't Be Soon Before Long Tour
July 5	Bodyslam	Every Bodyslam Concert
July 12	Super Junior	Super Show
November 23	Kylie Minogue	KylieX2008 World Tour
2009
November 28–29	Super Junior	Super Show 2
2010
January 12	Green Day	21st Century Breakdown World Tour
2011
January 15–16	Super Junior	Super Show 3
February 10	Scorpions	Get Your Sting and Blackout World Tour
February 20	Eagles	Long Road Out of Eden Tour
March 10	Slash	Slash 2010–11 World Tour
June 25	Kylie Minogue	Aphrodite: Les Folies Tour
September 23	Linkin Park	A Thousand Suns World Tour
November 28	Pitbull	Rebelution Tour
2012
February 12	Girls' Generation	Girls' Generation Tour
February 16–18	Super Junior	Super Show 4
February 25	CNBLUE	N/A
May 26–27	Beast	Beautiful Show
October 5–6	Big Bang	Alive Galaxy Tour
October 8	Maroon 5	Overexposed Tour
November 2	Chicago	Chicago Live In Bangkok
November 3–4	The Last FaTFEST	
November 5	Hit Man David Foster and Friends Live in Bangkok 2012	
November 17–18	25 Years BABB BIRD BIRD SHOW	
December 12	Sting	Back to Bass Tour
December 13	Elton John	40th Anniversary of the Rocket Man
2013
February 5	Luna Sea	Luna Sea Live 2012–2013 The End of the Dream Bangkok
February 16	Mr.Team Returns	
February 16	Super Junior	2013 Super Junior-M Fan Party [Break Down] in Bangkok
March 2	Fat Live Smallroom	
March 6	Santana	The Sentiment Tour
March 16	Stamp Concert	
May 4	CNBLUE	Blue Moon World Tour
June 7–8	G-Dragon	One of a Kind World Tour
July 10	Ronan Keating	Ronan Keating live in Bangkok 2013
August 3–4	Super Junior	Super Show 5
August 24	Pet Shop Boys	Electric Tour
September 26	Justin Bieber	Believe Tour
2014
January 11	Girls' Generation	Girls & Peace World Tour
February 11	Avril Lavigne	The Avril Lavigne Tour
March 20	Bruno Mars	Moonshine Jungle Tour
August 23	2NE1	All or Nothing World Tour
September 13–14	Exo	Exo from Exoplanet 1 – The Lost Planet
September 21	The Palace	The Palace & Friends
October 30	Mariah Carey	The Elusive Chanteuse Show
December 13	JYP Nation	JYP Nation Live in Bangkok
2015
January 10–11	Super Junior	Super Show 6
January 17	The Palace	The Palace & Friends RESTAGE
January 24	Michael Bublé	To Be Loved Tour
March 26–29	Disney On Ice	Dare To Dream
May 6	Backstreet Boys	In a World Like This Tour
May 8	The Script	No Sound Without Silence Tour
May 14	Katy Perry	Prismatic World Tour
May 24	Boyzone	BZ20 Tour
June 20–21	Exo	Exo Planet 2 – The Exo'luxion
July 11	Ne-Yo, Pitbull	Live in Bangkok 2015
July 11–12	Big Bang	Made World Tour
August 8	BTS	2015 BTS Live Trilogy Episode II: The Red Bullet
August 29	2PM	Take You Home Tonight
August 29	Imagine Dragons	Smoke + Mirrors Tour
September 21–23	Maroon 5	Maroon V Tour
September 27	Shinee	Shinee World IV
November 29	Elton John	All the Hits Tour
2016
January 16	CNBLUE	2016 CNBLUE Live "Come Together" in Bangkok
January 21	One Ok Rock	2016 "35xxxv" Asia Tour Live in Bangkok
January 30–31	Girls' Generation	Girls' Generation's Phantasia
February 9–10	Madonna	Rebel Heart Tour
February 27–28	Thongchai Concert	
February 29	Santana	Luminosity Tour
March 3	Take That	Take That Live in Bangkok 2016
March 6	The Next Venture Concert 2016	
March 8	5 Seconds of Summer	Sounds Live Feels Live World Tour
March 16	David Foster; Natalie Imbruglia; Peter Cetera; Melanie C Richard Marx; Gerphil Flores	Hitman David Foster & Friends – Asia Tour 2016
March 19	Super Junior	Super Camp
March 30 – April 5	Disney On Ice	Magical Ice Festival
June 11–12	Got7	Fly Tour
July 16	iKon	iKoncert 2016: Showtime Tour
July 29	Selena Gomez	Revival Tour
September 10–11	Exo	Exo Planet 3 – The Exo'rdium
September 30	Queen + Adam Lambert	2016 Summer Festival Tour
2017
January 21	Ji Chang-wook	2017 Ji Chang Wook 1st Fan Meeting in Bangkok
February 4	เทยแฟร์ แม่ครองเมือง	
February 11	Park Bo-gum	Park Bogum Asia Tour Fan Meeting in Bangkok
February 25	Lee Jong-suk	2017 Lee Jong Suk Fan Meeting "Variety" in Bangkok
March 4	Dog Chill Out – Charity Concert by the Lake	
March 11	Running Man 2017 Live in Bangkok	
March 18	Modern Dog	Moderndog 22 Concert
March 19	Cho Kyuhyun	Kyuhyun Solo Concert -Reminiscence of a novelist- in Bangkok
March 30 – April 2	The Wonderful World of Disney on Ice	
April 8	Twice	Twice 1st Tour: Twiceland – The Opening
April 22–23	BTS	The Wings Tour
April 29	LOVE IS IN THE AIR: Channel 3 Charity Concert	
May 20	หัวขบวน คอนเสิร์ต เสียงสู่ฟ้า	
May 28	Taeyeon	Persona
June 23–24	Britney Spears	Britney: Live in Concert
July 1	Silly Fools	Leo Presents Silly War II Concert ‘สงครามของคนโง่’
July 7–8	G-Dragon	Act III, M.O.T.T.E World Tour
July 30	Monsta X	Beautiful World Tour
August 13	CNBLUE	CNBLUE Live "BETWEEN US"
August 17	Ariana Grande	Dangerous Woman Tour
August 26	Slot Machine	The Mothership
September 21	OneRepublic	Honda Civic Tour
November 16	Ed Sheeran	÷ Tour
December 11	Shawn Mendes	Illuminate World Tour
2018
January 11	Imagine Dragons	Evolve World Tour
January 28	Super Junior	Super Show 7
March 16–18	Exo	Exo Planet 4 – The EℓyXiOn
March 28 – April 1	Disney On Ice	Everyone's Story
April 10	Katy Perry	Witness: The Tour
April 28	The Script	Freedom Child Tour
April 30 – May 1	Bruno Mars	24K Magic World Tour
May 7	Harry Styles	Harry Styles: Live on Tour
May 11–13	Got7	World Tour "Eyes On You" 2018
June 30	Monsta X	The Connect World Tour
July 7	Yoona	"So Wonderful Day" Fan Meeting Tour
July 23	Celine Dion	Celine Dion Live 2018
August 4–5	Wanna One	One: The World
August 17	TVXQ	Circle Tour
August 18	Twice	Twiceland Zone 2 – Fantasy Park
September 8	B5	B5 NOW 15 CONCERT
September 8	Red Velvet	Redmare Tour
September 15	Day6	Day6 First World Tour "Youth"
September 20	Tiffany Young	Tiffany Young Asia Fan Meeting Tour 2018
September 29–30	KCON 2018 Thailand	
October 6	Mayday	Life Tour
October 19–20	iKon	iKon 2018 Continue Tour
October 21	Winner	Winner 2018 Everywhere Tour
October 28	Sam Smith	The Thrill Of It All Tour
October 29	Charlie Puth	Voicenotes Tour
December 2	The Weeknd	The Weeknd Asia Tour
December 1–2	Taeyeon	's Taeyeon Concert
December 16	IU	2018 IU 10th Anniversary Tour Concert
December 17	Miss Universe	Miss Universe 2018
2019
January 11–13	Blackpink	In Your Area World Tour
January 19	Stray Kids	Unveil Tour "I Am…"
January 26	BNK48	BNK48 Space Mission Concert & BNK48 6th Single Senbatsu Sousenkyo
January 26	Mamamoo	2019 Mamamoo Asia Fan Meeting Tour "Hello Moomoo"
January 27	AKB48 Group	AKB48 Group Asia Festival 2019 in Bangkok
June 1	Monsta X	We Are Here World Tour
June 15	Twice	Twicelights World Tour
June 15	Bae Jin-young	Bae Jinyoung 1st Asia Fanmeeting in Bangkok “Im Young”
June 21–23	NCT 127	Neo City – The Origin
July 12–14	Blackpink	In Your Area World Tour Encore
July 26	Westlife	The Twenty Tour
August 17	Tiffany Young	Tiffany Young Open Hearts Eve Concert
September 28–29	KCON 2019 Thailand	
October 1	Shawn Mendes	Shawn Mendes: The Tour
October 24	Backstreet Boys	DNA World Tour
2020
January 12	K-Joy Music Festival 2020	
January 18	2020 Applewood Festa	
January 25-26	Bodyslam	Bodyslam Nab 1 Teung 7 Concert
February 16	D2B	D2B Infinity Fun+ 2020
October 31–November 1	The Gentlemen Live	
November 7–8	Peck Palitchoke	15th Anniversary The Final Odyssey Concert
November 21–22	Fantopia	
December 19	Asanee–Wasan	คอนเสิร์ต ระริกระรี้ กระดี่คอนเสิร์ต
2022
May 27–29	Mark Tuan	Pull-Up Fan Meeting
July 24–25	KinnPorsche The Series World Tour 2022	
July 30–31	Super Junior	Super Show 9: Road
August 6–7	คอนเสิร์ต ตัน fight ตัน	
August 13–14	Marathon Concert Fest	
August 20	Love Out Loud Fan Fest 2022	
August 20	(G)I-dle	Just Me ( )I-dle World Tour
August 24	Billie Eilish	Happier Than Ever, The World Tour
September 10	Kong Saharat	In My Life Concert
September 17	Num Kala	My Name is Num Kala Concert "First Impact Concert" #อยากจับมือกับฉันเรื่อยไปรึเปล่า
September 24	Stamp Apiwat	แสตมป์ ด้วยรักและแอบดี
October 1	2022 Best of Best Concert	
October 8	The Gentlemen Live 2: Ladies and Gentlemen	
October 15	Kamikaze	Kamikaze Party 2022
October 22	Ink Waruntorn	INKSYLAND ดินแดนขยี้ใจ คอนเสิร์ต
October 22–23	Tomorrow X Together	Act: Lovesick
November 11–13	Bird Thongchai	Singing Bird #2/2022 Lifetime Soundtrack Concert
November 26	Jackson Wang	Magic Man World Tour 2022
December 3–5	NCT 127	Neo City – The Link
December 17	RS Meeting Concert 2022 Dance Marathon ปลายปี...ถึงทีเต้น	
December 24	Bright Vachirawit, Win Metawin	Side By Side Concert
2023
January 21–22	Jay B	JAY B TAPE: PRESS PAUSE
January 28–29	Enhypen	Manifesto World Tour
February 2–3	Stray Kids	Maniac World Tour
February 18	Pu Pongsit	คอนเสิร์ต 35 ปี คำภีร์ ถึงเพื่อน
February 19	รวมมิตร Charity Concert Festival	
February 23–24	KinnPorsche The Series World Tour 2023 (What The Fun)	
February 28	Westlife	The Wild Dreams Tour
March 3	OneRepublic	OneRepublic Presents Live In Concert Tour
March 10–12	NCT Dream	The Dream Show 2: In A Dream
March 18–19	KCON 2023 Thailand	
March 31 – April 2	Treasure	Treasure Tour Hello
April 4	The 1975	At Their Very Best
April 8	Itzy	Checkmate World Tour
April 22	Y2K CONFEST	
April 29–30	Asanee–Wasan	คอนเสิร์ต 37 ปี อัสนีและวสันต์
May 5–7	Mark Tuan	The Other Side Asia Tour
May 20–21	Micro	Micro The Last ร็อค เล็ก เล็ก
May 27	RS HITS JOURNEY CONCERT 2023 #ต้นปีถึงทีฮิต	
June 9–11	Suga	D-Day Tour
June 17	Jennifer Kim	เกินคิ้ม คอนเสิร์ต
June 25	Kun	Kun 2023 World Tour
July 8–9	Ive	The Prom Queens Fan Concert Tour
July 22	Patrick Finkler	Patrick 1st Fan Meeting in Bangkok
July 29–30	GRAMMY X RS : 90's Versary Concert	
July 29–30	Aespa	Synk: Hyper Line
August 5–6	D2B	D2B ETERNITY CONCERT 22 ปีนับตั้งแต่วันที่ฉันรักเธอ
August 12–13	Taeyeon	The Odd of Love Tour
August 13	Proxie	The 1st Concert 'ACCESS'
August 19	Three Man Down	Three Man Down Live At Impact Arena 2023
August 26–27	Gemini Norawit, Fourth Nattawat	Gemini Fourth My Turn Concert
September 17	Trinity	Breath of Desire Concert
September 23–24	Twice	Ready to Be World Tour
September 30–October 1	Nont Tanont	Nont Ep.02 So Serious จริง ๆ จัง ๆ Concert
October 3	Sam Smith	Gloria the Tour
October 6	Charlie Puth	Charlie the Live Experience
October 7–8	Le Sserafim	Flame Rises Tour
October 21	Kamikaze	Kamikaze Party Reunion 2023
October 28–29	Grammy RS Concerts HIT100	
November 4–5	Billkin	Tempo Concert
November 11	Carabao	คอนเสิร์ต 40 ปี
November 17–19, 25–26	Bird Thongchai	คอนเสิร์ตแบบเบิร์ดเบิร์ดโชว์ 2023 ตอน MULTIBIRD จักรวาลธงไชย
December 2	Golf & Mike	Bounce To The Future Concert
December 9	Christina Aguilar	Christina Q Concert
December 12	One Ok Rock	Luxury Disease Asia Tour 2023
December 16	Short Charge Shock Real Rock Return	
December 19	50 Cent	The Final Lap Tour
December 23	GMMTV	STARLYMPIC
2024
January 13	DMD LAND 2 Wonder Show Concert	
January 20–21	Mark Tuan	The Other Side ASIA TOUR 2024
January 27	Ive	Show What I Have World Tour
February 3–4	Tattoo Colour	กาลครั้ง 5 TATTOO COLOUR FEST
February 4	Ado	Wish World Tour
February 10	4Eve	4EVE Concert “NOW OR NEVER“
February 17	RS Meeting Concert 2024: Dance Marathon 2 ยกกำลังเต้น	
February 24	90’s Forever Concert	
March 2–3	Ten	1001 Fan-con Tour
March 16	Itzy	Born to Be World Tour
April 27	Asanee–Wasan	อัสนี-วสันต์ คอนเสิร์ต ฉันเคยบอกกับเธอหรือยัง
May 11–12	Grammy RS Concerts HIT100 Vol.2	
May 18–19	LOVE OUT LOUD FAN FEST 2024 : THE LOVE PIRATES	
May 23–26	Treasure	TREASURE RELAY TOUR REBOOT
June 1–2	THE KINGDOMS CONCERT	
June 21–23	Bodyslam	EveryBodyslam2024 The Sunny Side Up Live at Impact Arena
June 29–30	IU	IU HEREH World Tour
July 6–7	Loso	28 Yrs Loso - We are the rock & roll concert
July 27–28	Riize	Riizing Day Fan-con Tour
August 10–11	NuNew	1st Concert “DREAM CATCHER”
August 17–18	Red Velvet	Red Velvet Fan-con Tour "Happiness : My Dear, ReVe1uv"
August 24–25	GFEST MARATHON CONCERT	
August 31–September 1	Gemini Norawit, Fourth Nattawat	Gemini Fourth Run The World Concert
September 7–8, 11–12	Palmy	มิตร Universe Concert
September 15–16	Olivia Rodrigo	Guts World Tour
September 21	ตัน Fight ตัน Variety Concert 2	
September 28–29	Aespa	Synk: Parallel Line World Tour
October 5	JJ Lin	JJ20 World Tour
October 12–13	Yugyeom	YUGYEOM TOUR [TRUSTY]
October 19	(G)I-dle	I-dol World Tour
October 26	Grammy RS Concerts Dance Arena	
November 2–3	WayV	WayV Concert "On the Way"
November 9–10	Fujii Kaze	Best of Fujii Kaze 2020-2024 Asia Tour
November 16	Proxie	The 2nd Concert 'The Final Fantasy'
November 23–24	Bird Thongchai	คอนเสิร์ต "ขนนกกับดอกไม้" ตอน Dream For Love
November 27	Dua Lipa	Radical Optimism Tour
December 14	Dan Worrawech, Beam Kawee	DAN-BEAM DREAM 2 BE CONCERT 21ST CENTURY DADDY’S CLUB
December 21	GMMTV	STARLYMPICS 2024
December 28	Dylan Wang	D.PARTY CONCERT
2025
January 11–12	Jay B	JAY B CONCERT TAPE: RE LOAD
January 25–26	2NE1	Welcome Back Tour
February 3	Maroon 5	Asia 2025
February 8	Taeyang	2025 TOUR THE LIGHT YEAR
February 12	Green Day	The Saviors Tour
February 14	K-Pop Masterz 2025	
February 22	RABBIT TO THE MOON 2025	
February 26	Keshi	REQUIEM TOUR
March 1	Rock War Festival 2025	
March 8–9	PP Krit	My Pleasure Concert
March 14–16	BUS because of you i shine	The 1st Concert 'LIGHT THE WORLD'
March 22	Lipta	Lipta 20 ปี คอนใหญ่ไฟกระพริบ Live at Impact Arena
April 12	Li Yifeng	Yifeng Li The Covenant of the Green Sea Concert
May 3–4	Jeff Satur	RED GIANT CONCERT
May 10–11	J-Hope	Hope on the Stage Tour
May 17–18	LOVE OUT LOUD FAN FEST 2025 : LOVEMOSPHERE	
May 31–June 1	Taeyeon	Taeyeon Concert - 'The TENSE'
June 7–8	Babymonster	Hello Monsters World Tour
June 28–29	Boyd Kosiyabong, Pod Thanachai	BOYdPOD Our Songs Together Concert
July 12	Groove Riders	RETURN OF THE GROOVE CONCERT
August 9–10	Le Sserafim	Easy Crazy Hot Tour
August 30–31	Gemini Norawit, Fourth Nattawat	Gemini Fourth A.W.A.K.E Concert
September 16	Tyler, the Creator	Chromakopia: The World Tour
November 21	Miss Universe	The 74th Miss Universe
December 5–7	Bakery Music, Sony Music Thailand	B.Day 2025

== See also ==
- List of tennis stadiums by capacity

Preceded by CEMEXPO (Ecuador) Quito	Miss Universe 2005 Venue	Succeeded by Shrine Auditorium (United States) Los Angeles
Preceded by PH Live (United States) Las Vegas	Miss Universe 2018 Venue	Succeeded by Tyler Perry Studios (United States) Atlanta
Preceded by Arena CDMX; Mexico City	Miss Universe 2025 Venue	Succeeded by José Miguel Agrelot Coliseum (Puerto Rico) San Juan
