= Keeree Kanjanapas =

Thai businessman

- คีรี กาญจนพาสน์
- Born: 1950 (age 75–76); Bangkok
- Education: Pui Kiu Middle School
- Children: 2
- Parent: Mongkol Kanjanapas (Father)
- Relatives: Anant Kanjanapas (elder brother)

Keeree Kanjanapas (Thai: คีรี กาญจนพาสน์, RTGS: Khiri Kanchanaphat; born 1950), also known by his Chinese name Wong Chong Shan (Chinese: 黃創山; pinyin: Huáng Chuàngshān; Jyutping: wong4 cong3 saan1) is a Thai entrepreneur with extensive business interests in mass transit and real estate in Thailand. He was born in Bangkok, Thailand in 1950 and has family roots in Chaozhou (Guangdong Province). He is the founder and CEO of the Bangkok Mass Transit System PCL (BTSC) "BTS Skytrain".

He is chairman of the listed Tanayong Public Company Limited, a long-established property developer and hospitality operator in Thailand.

== Seiko S. A. ==
Keeree's father Mongkol Kanjanapas was a businessman born in Bangkok and based in both Thailand and Hong Kong. Mongkol founded Stelux Holdings (寶光實業) and was the importer of Seiko watches. Keeree decided to use football to promote the Seiko brand and founded one of the most famous and successful football teams ever in Hong Kong, Seiko Sports Association (精工), in the 1970s and 1980s. Keeree recruited top local player Wu Kwok Hung from South China AA by offering him a HK$40,000 annual salary. With Wu and a host of foreign players, the team won a total of nine Hong Kong First Division League titles including a record seven consecutive titles.

In 1986, when his plans for a super league was turned down by the Hong Kong Football Association, coupled with a Stelux business downturn, Keeree dissolved the football team after a full house farewell match for Wu Kwok Hung.

== Personal life ==
Keeree is the 13th richest man in Thailand as of 2016, up from 19th in 2012. He is worth US$1.7 billion according to Forbes.
