= Bangkok Land =

Real estate company in Thailand

- Company type: Public
- Traded as: SET: BLAND
- ISIN: TH0285B10Z08
- Industry: Real estate
- Founded: April 19, 1973
- Founder: Mongkol Kanjanapas
- Headquarters: Nonthaburi, Thailand
- Area served: Thailand
- Key people: Anant Kanjanapas (CEO and chairman, 1989–2020)
- Website: www.bangkokland.co.th

Bangkok Land Public Company Limited is a real estate company in Thailand. It is best known as the developer of Muang Thong Thani, a large residential development in Bangkok's northern suburb city of Pak Kret in Nonthaburi Province.

Bangkok Land was founded by Mongkol Kanjanapas of the Kanjanapas family in 1973. Mongkol's son Anant returned from Hong Kong to Thailand and headed the company from 1989, and it enjoyed spectacular growth in the early 1990s amid Thailand's bubble economy, becoming the highest-valued company on the Stock Exchange of Thailand following its listing in 1992. It was then hard hit by the 1997 Asian financial crisis, which saw its market value shrinking a hundred-fold from US$5.2 billion to $36 million, but the family was able to hold on to control of the company following restructuring. Bangkok Land was able to return to profitability through Impact, Muang Thong Thani, one of the largest convention and exhibition centres in Southeast Asia, which is managed by subsidiary Impact Exhibition Management Co., Ltd. It exited debt restructuring in 2012.
