= BTS Group Holdings =

Thai business conglomerate

BTS Group Holdings Public Company Limited
- Type: Public
- Traded as: SET: BTS
- ISIN: TH0221B10Z05
- Industry: Transportation, media, property, services
- Founded: 27 March 1968; 58 years ago
- Headquarters: Bangkok, Thailand
- Area served: Bangkok Metropolitan Region
- Key people: Keeree Kanjanapas (Chairman); Kavin Kanjanapas (CEO)
- Services: Mass transit; Media; Property; Services
- Revenue: ▼25,823 million baht (FY2021/22)
- Net income: ▼2,782 million baht (FY2021/22)
- Total assets: ▲255,867 million baht (FY2021/22)
- Total equity: ▲86,128 million baht (FY2021/22)
- Number of employees: 4,518 (2018-03-31)
- Subsidiaries: BTS Skytrain; Bangkok BRT
- Website: btsgroup.co.th

BTS Group Holdings Public Company Limited (BTSG), formerly known as Tanayong Public Company Limited, is a public company in Thailand. It is the majority share holder of Bangkok Mass Transit System PCL (BTSC), the operator of the BTS Skytrain and the Bangkok BRT.

== Businesses ==
BTSG does business in several areas: mass transit (through the Bangkok Mass Transit System Public Company Limited), media/advertising (through VGI Global Media), property/real estate (through property developer U City and hotel operator U Hotels & Resorts), and associated service businesses. BTSG has holdings in 57 subsidiaries, jointly controlled companies, or associated firms, it groups its operations into three segments "MOVE", "MIX" and "MATCH". But majority segments is human advertising.

=== Monorail Joint venture ===
A BSR Joint Venture between BTSG, Sino-Thai Engineering and Construction PCL and Ratchaburi Electricity Generating Holding PCL also hold the concession to build and operate the Pink Line and Yellow Line via two subsidiaries, Northern Bangkok Monorail Co., Ltd and Eastern Bangkok Monorail Co., Ltd.

== Financials ==
BTSG's fiscal year runs from 1 April to 31 March. For fiscal year 2021-2022 (1 April 2021 – 31 March 2022), BTS Holdings reported 31,195 million baht in total revenues, total assets of 255,867 million baht, net income of 2,782 million baht, and total equity of 86,128 million baht, and it employed 5,357 persons.

In 2017/8 Its 14-person board of directors was remunerated 29 million baht. Its eight executives were given 92 million baht in monetary compensation, not including stock warrants.

BTSG's four business units—mass transit, media, property, and services—contributed 65 percent, 28 percent, four percent, and three percent to group operating revenues respectively.
