= Min Buri subdistrict =

Min Buri มีนบุรี
- Khwaeng
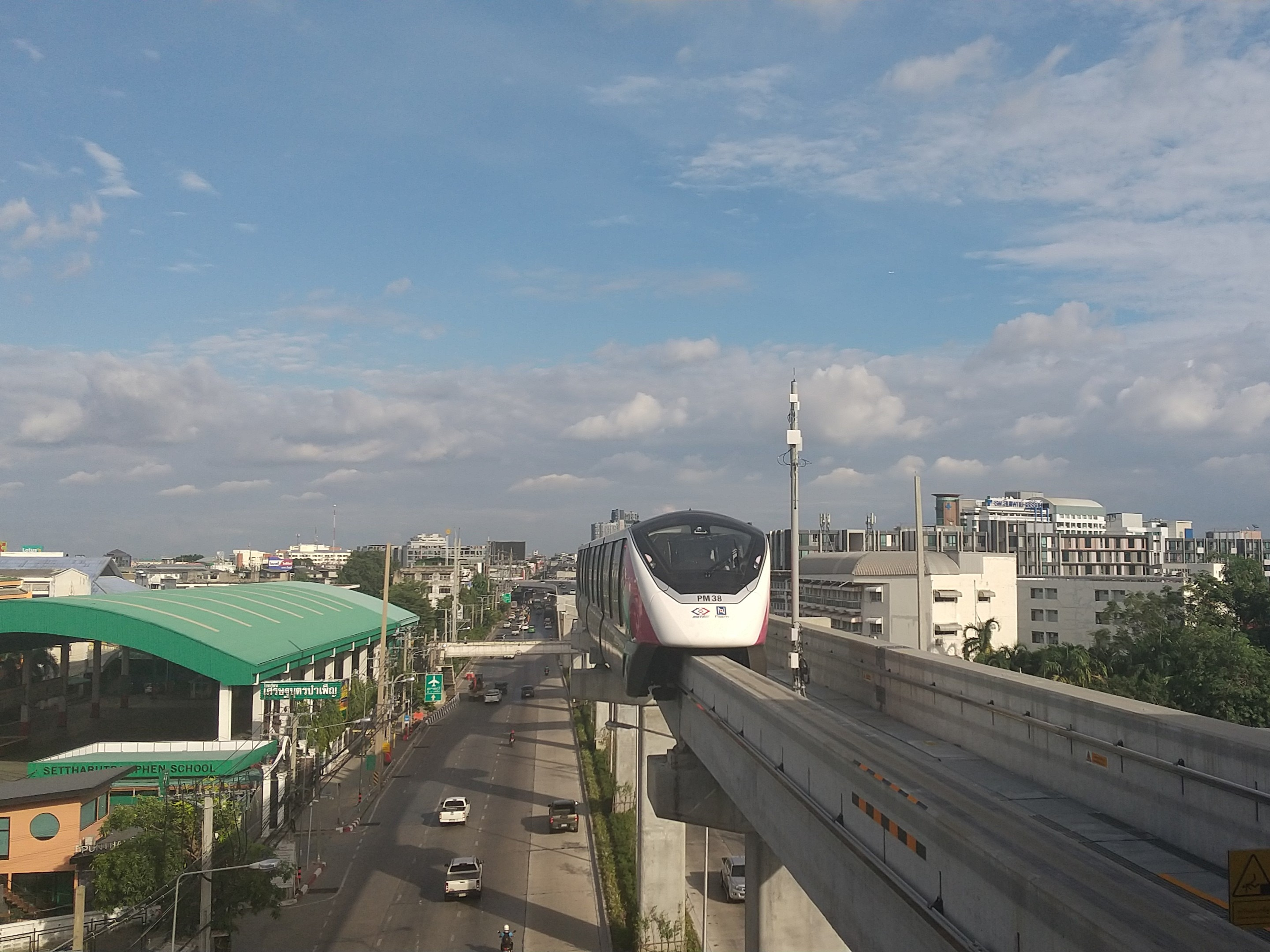
- MRT Pink Line skytrain runs above Ram Inthra road in the Min Buri area
- Etymology: City of Fish
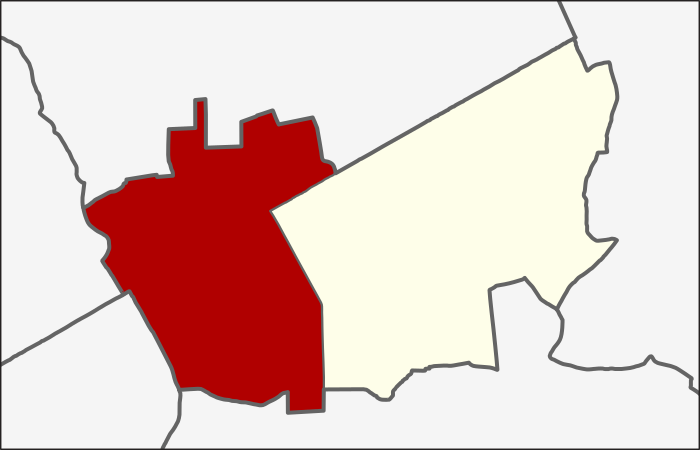
- Location in Min Buri district
- Country: Thailand
- Province: Bangkok
- Khet: Min Buri

Area
  - Total: 28.459 km^{2} (10.988 sq mi)

Population (2022)
  - Total: 95,967
  - Density: 3,751.52/km^{2} (9,716.4/sq mi)
- Time zone: UTC+7 (ICT)
- Postal code: 10510
- TIS 1099: 101001

Min Buri (Note: Often written as Minburi.) (Thai: แขวงมีนบุรี, pronounced [kʰwɛ̌ːŋ mīːn būrīː]) is a khwaeng (subdistrict) of Min Buri district, Bangkok, Thailand.

== Toponymy ==
A suburban area at the eastern fringe of Bangkok, it was named by the royal government in 19th century as Min Buri literally "City of Fish", to go with its neighbouring town, Thanyaburi or "City of Grains". The latter is now a district in Pathum Thani province, Thanyaburi.

== Geography ==
Min Buri is surrounded by other subdistricts (from the north clockwise): Bang Chan, Sai Kong Din and Sai Kong Din Tai in Khlong Sam Wa district, Saen Saep in its district, Khlong Sam Prawet and Khlong Song Ton Nun in Lat Krabang district, Rat Phatthana in Saphan Sung district and Khan Na Yao in Khan Na Yao district.

== Population ==
As of December 2022, the area had a total population of 95,967 people.

== Places ==
- Min Buri District Office
- Setthabut Bamphen School
- Min Buri Market
- Khwan Riam Floating Market
