= Hua Takhe =

Community and marketplace in Thailand

Coordinates: 13°43′28.1″N 100°47′19.6″E

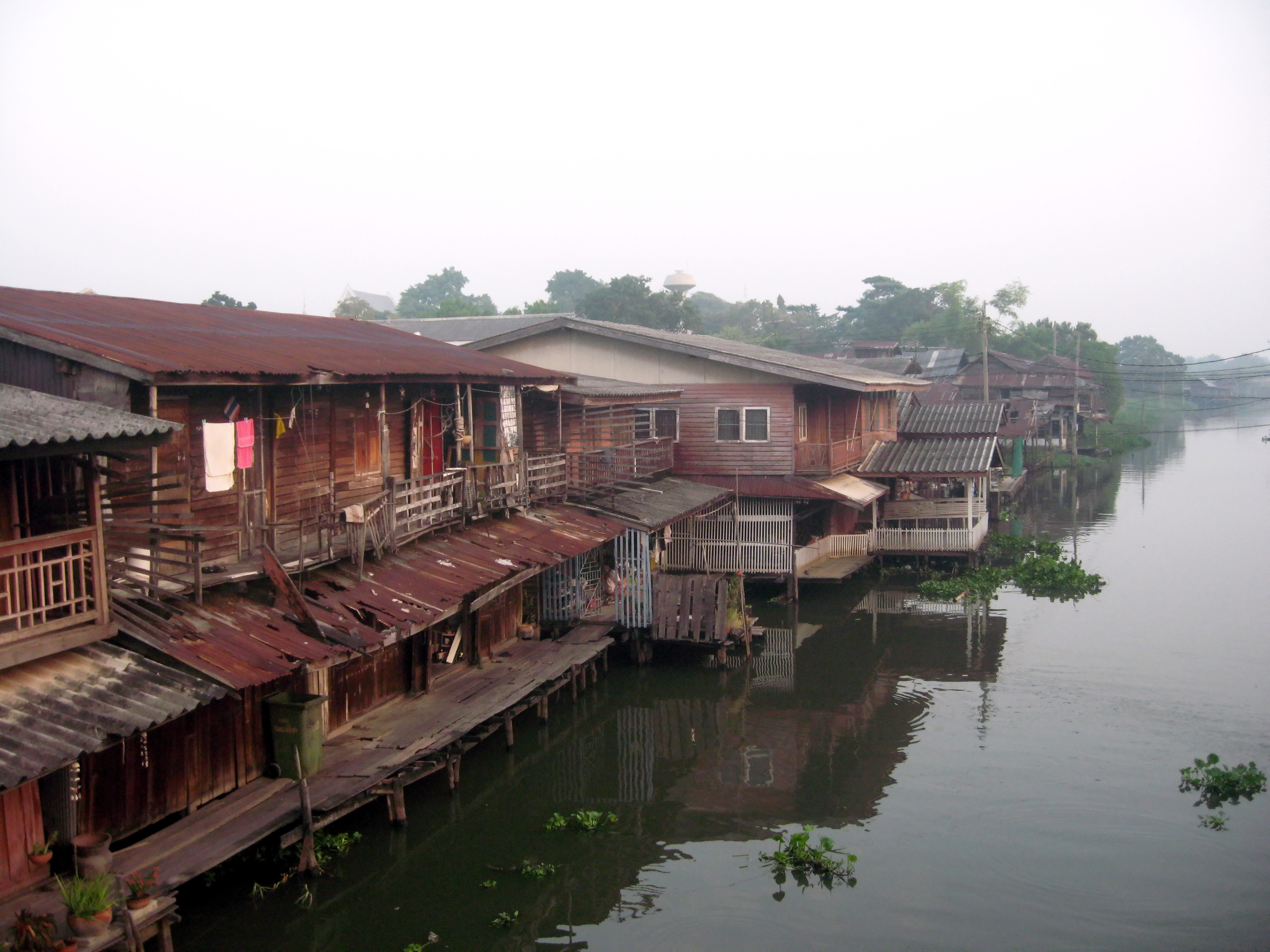
Hua Takhe community in the morning

Hua Takhe (Thai: หัวตะเข้, pronounced [hǔa̯ tā.kʰêː]) is a community and marketplace in Lat Krabang District, and the name of the surrounding its location in eastern Bangkok. It is located on the tripoint between Thap Yao, Lat Krabang and Lam Pla Thio Subdistricts

Hua Takhe is in an old community along the Khlong Prawet Burirom, where is a confluence of three khlongs (canals) Prawet Burirom, Lam Pla Thio, and Hua Takhe. Its name meaning "crocodile's head". Because when the khlong was canalize in this area, there was an excavation to discover a small crocodile skull. It also has become the name of other places around this area were Sisa Chorakhe Noi, Sisa Chorakhe Yai etc.

Presently, the skull of small crocodile and two pieces rostrum of sawfish are enshrined in the local tutelary joss house.

This community dates back to the reign of King Chulalongkorn (Rama V), in those days it was regarded as the center of eastern Bangkok. Hua Takhe consists of old two-story wooden shophouses that has a century-old market with shops selling provisions, dresses, cafés, various types of food (Khanom sai bua is a local delicacy), a TV repair shop, agricultural equipment repair shop, beauty salon, barber, even homestay.

In addition, some house and walls are lathered with chic graffiti in form of photo spot for visitors. Including there are also lanes for cycling around the area as well.

Hua Takhe situated in the Soi Lat Krabang 17, Lat Krabang Rd, flanked by Udomphol Market and Hua Takhe Railway Station, and not far from King Mongkut's Institute of Technology Ladkrabang.
