= Wat Phraya Suren =

Coordinates: 13°52′25″N 100°41′07″E

- วัดพระยาสุเรนทร์
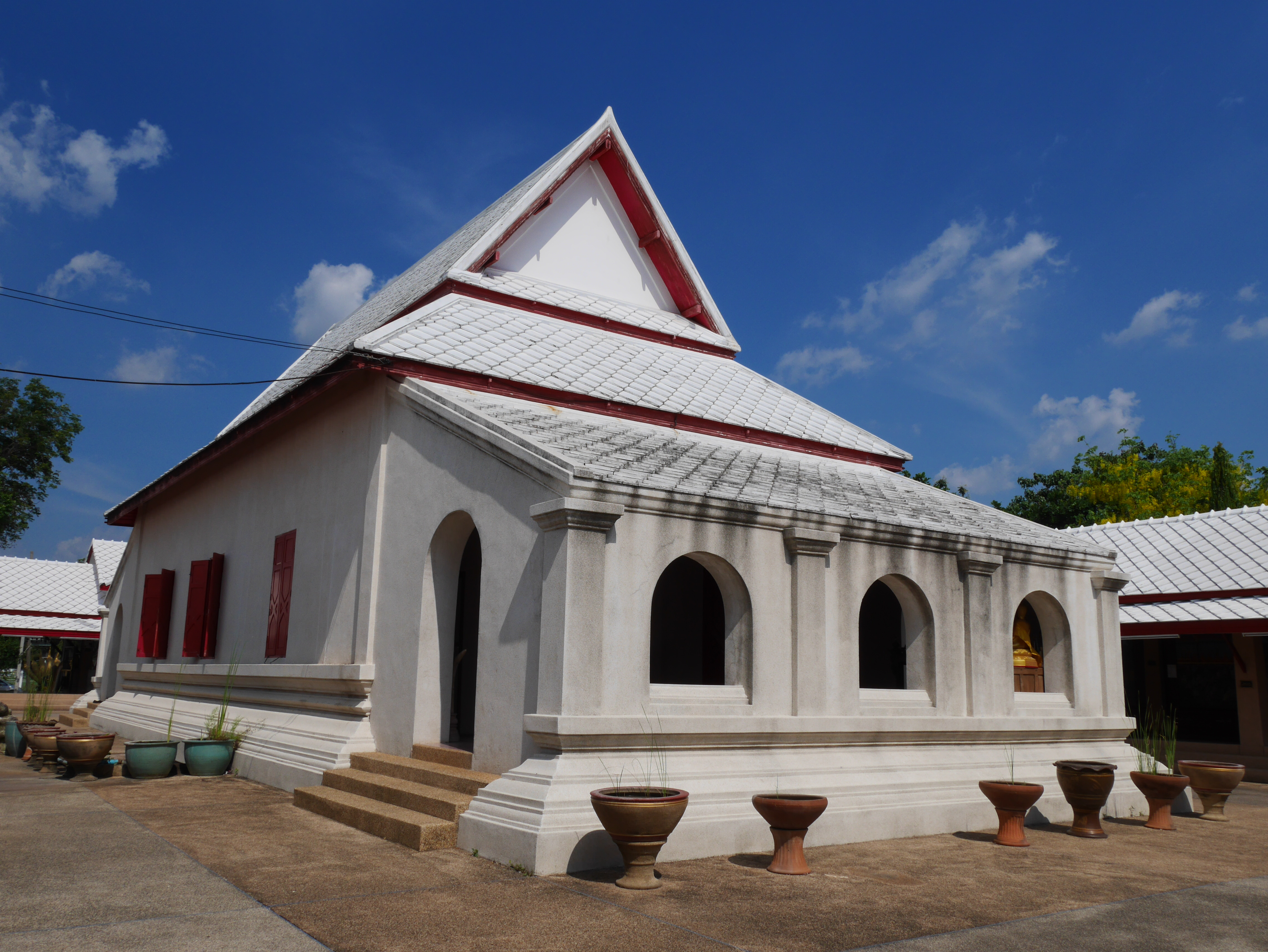
- The ordination hall of the temple

- Location within Thailand

Religion
- Affiliation: Buddhism
- Sect: Theravāda, Mahā Nikāya

Location
- Location: 32 Soi Phraya Suren 50, Sam Wa Tawan Tok Subdistrict, Khlong Sam Wa District, Bangkok
- Country: Thailand
- Interactive map of Wat Phraya Suren

Architecture
- Founder: Praya Suren Rachasena (Phueng Singhaseni)
- Completed: 1882

Website
- https://www.facebook.com/prayasuren54

Wat Phraya Suren (Thai: วัดพระยาสุเรนทร์, RTGS: Wat Phraya Suren, pronounced [wát pʰrá.jāː sùː.rēn]) is a Thai Buddhist temple located on Soi Phraya Suren 50, Phraya Suren Rd, Sam Wa Tawan Tok Subdistrict, Khlong Sam Wa District, eastern Bangkok.

== History ==
It is an important and an old temple over 120 years, built by Phraya Suren Rachasena (Phueng Singhaseni), who was the grandson of Chao Phraya Bodindecha (Sing Sinhaseni). When Praya Suren was 15 years, he was entrusted to a vassal in Krom Phra Ratchawang Bowon Wichaichan. Later, King Chulalongkorn (Rama V) was to give a position to him, to be Praya Suren Rachasena at the age 30 years, to get 4,000 rai (640 ha; 1,600 acres) rice field in feudalism. And on Tuesday, April 25, 1882, he was to build Wat Phraya Suren on an area of 48 rai (7.7 ha; 19 acres) in Minburi District (Khlong Sam Wa in now) as a royal charity to King Chulalongkorn and wisungkhammasima (temple milestone) received from the King. Later he was ordained as a novice, until he died in year 1956 with senility. At present, his shrine is located within the temple area. To allow people to worship and commemorate. Interesting structure of this temple includes Sala 12 Rasi in Thai or 12 Zodiac Hall, is enshrined relics five countries, which invite from Sri Lanka, India, Nepal, Myanmar and Thailand.

Moreover, there is also largest statue of legendary monk, Luang Pu Thuat enshrined at front of the temple, this statue is considered to be the largest statue of him in Bangkok.

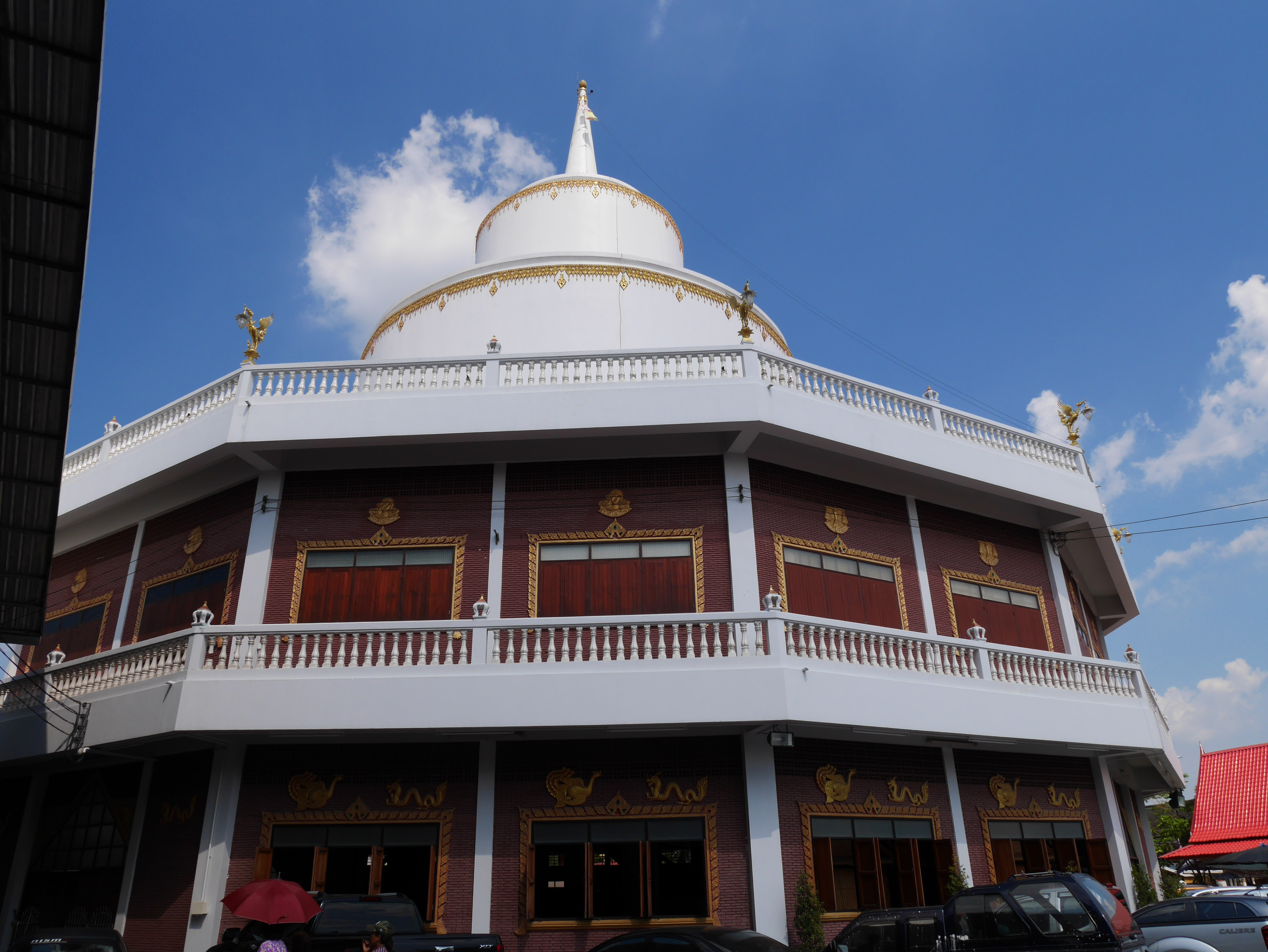
Sala 12 Rasi

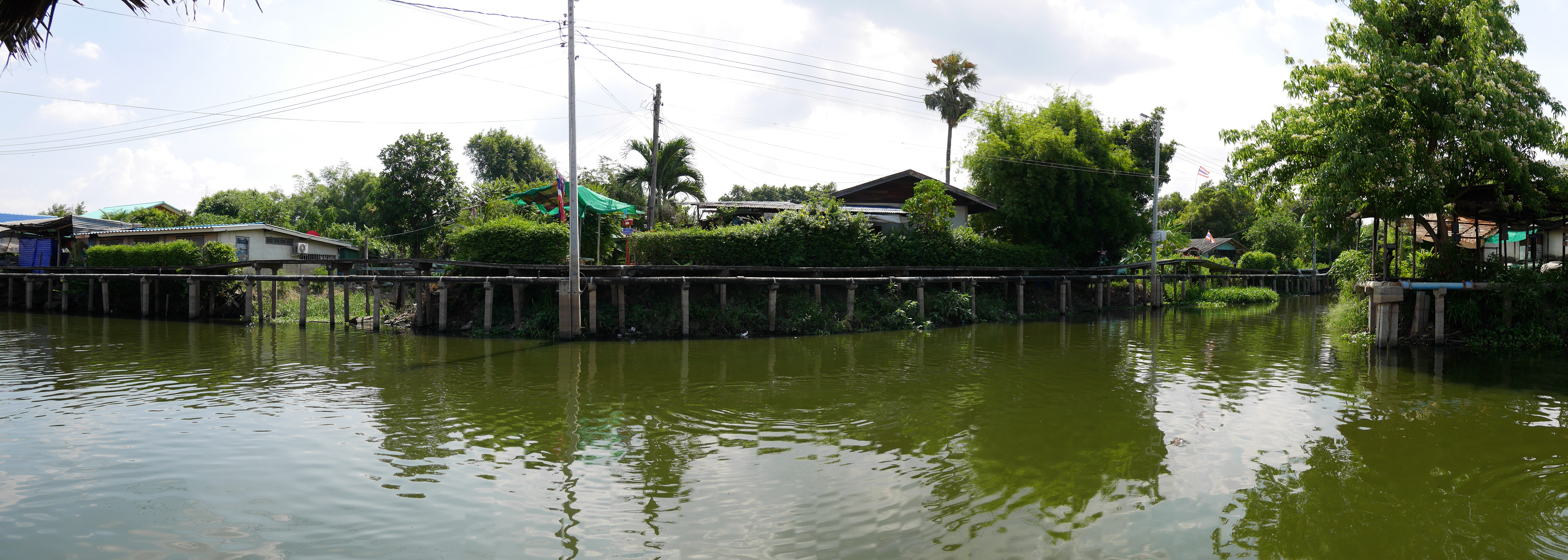
Atmosphere of Khlong Phraya Suren, where the location of the floating market

== Bueng Phraya Floating Market ==
Bueng Phraya Floating Market or familiarly known as Wat Phraya Suren Floating Market, is the floating market within the temple, It is located rim Bueng Phraya, also known as Khlong Phraya Suren canal. This floating market is a market in environment and the lifestyle of the communities along the Khlong Phraya Suren with a long history. Opened for sell in the first day, on August 8, 2014. It is regarded as another floating market in east Bangkok zone apart from Khwan Riam Floating Market in Minburi.

The market has more than 200 stores, consisting of many goods including foods, clothes, kid toys, keepsakes, but mostly is a variety of foods, both sweet and savory. Here are tables and chairs to sit and eat at the waterfront of Khlong Phraya Suren. At the end of the market, only on Sunday, there will be stage performances by students from the Phraya Suren School nearby, for visitors to watch them.

This market is available only on Saturday–Sunday and public holidays from 07.00 am to 05.00 pm.

Wat Phraya Suren and its floating market are not accessible by BMTA bus because they are located in an area that is down the road surrounded by gardens and fields. Visitors can also take a songthaew (Thai style minibus) or six-wheeled truck service from Minburi Market for nine baht fare.
