= Phra Nakhon Park =

Park in Bangkok, Thailand

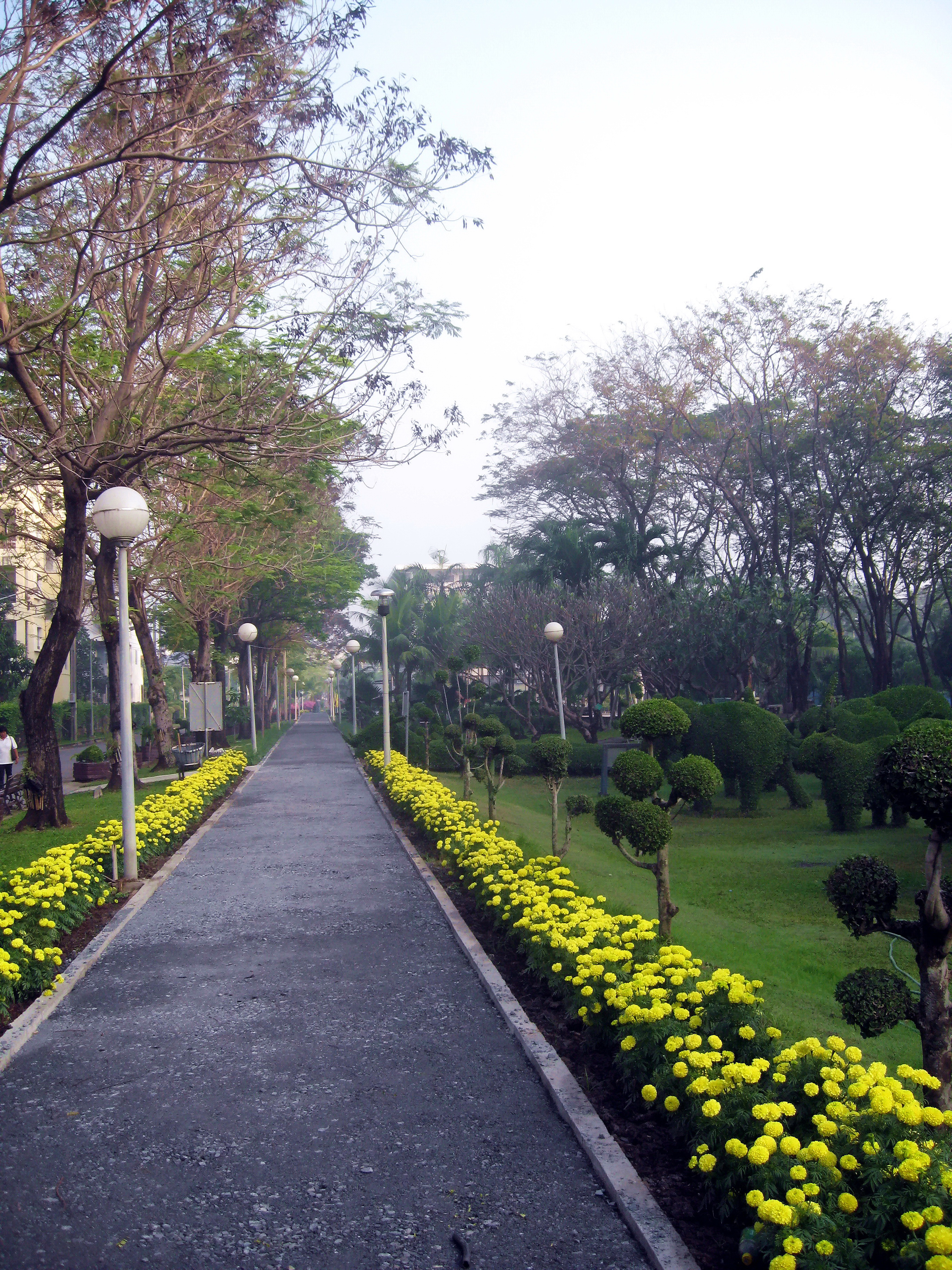
- Walking and jogging trail
- Interactive map of Phra Nakhon Park
- Type: Public park
- Location: 1 Lat Krabang Rd, Lat Krabang, Lat Krabang, Bangkok 10520
- Coordinates: 13°43′11.4″N 100°46′46.7″E
- Area: 19.76 acres (8.00 ha)
- Created: 1974
- Operator: Bangkok Metropolitan Administration (BMA)
- Status: Open year round
- Public transit: BMTA buses no. 143, 151, 517
- Website: http://office.bangkok.go.th/publicpark/park13.asp

Phra Nakhon Park (Thai: สวนพระนคร, pronounced [sǔa̯n pʰráʔ ná(ʔ).kʰɔ̄ːn]) otherwise known as Lat Krabang Park (สวนลาดกระบัง, pronounced [sǔa̯n lâːt krā.bāŋ]) is a public park in Lat Krabang District, Bangkok, Thailand.

== History ==
In the beginning, the park had been the responsibility of the Lat Krabang District Office. In the year 1974, then Bangkok Governor Chamnan Yaovabun assigned the Department of Environment to administer the park instead. The area is originally lowland, leading to flooding problems in rainy seasons every year. It brought difficulties in maintenance; therefore, there was land revitalization to eliminate flooding issues and land development to be a complete public park as a outskirts residents recreational place.

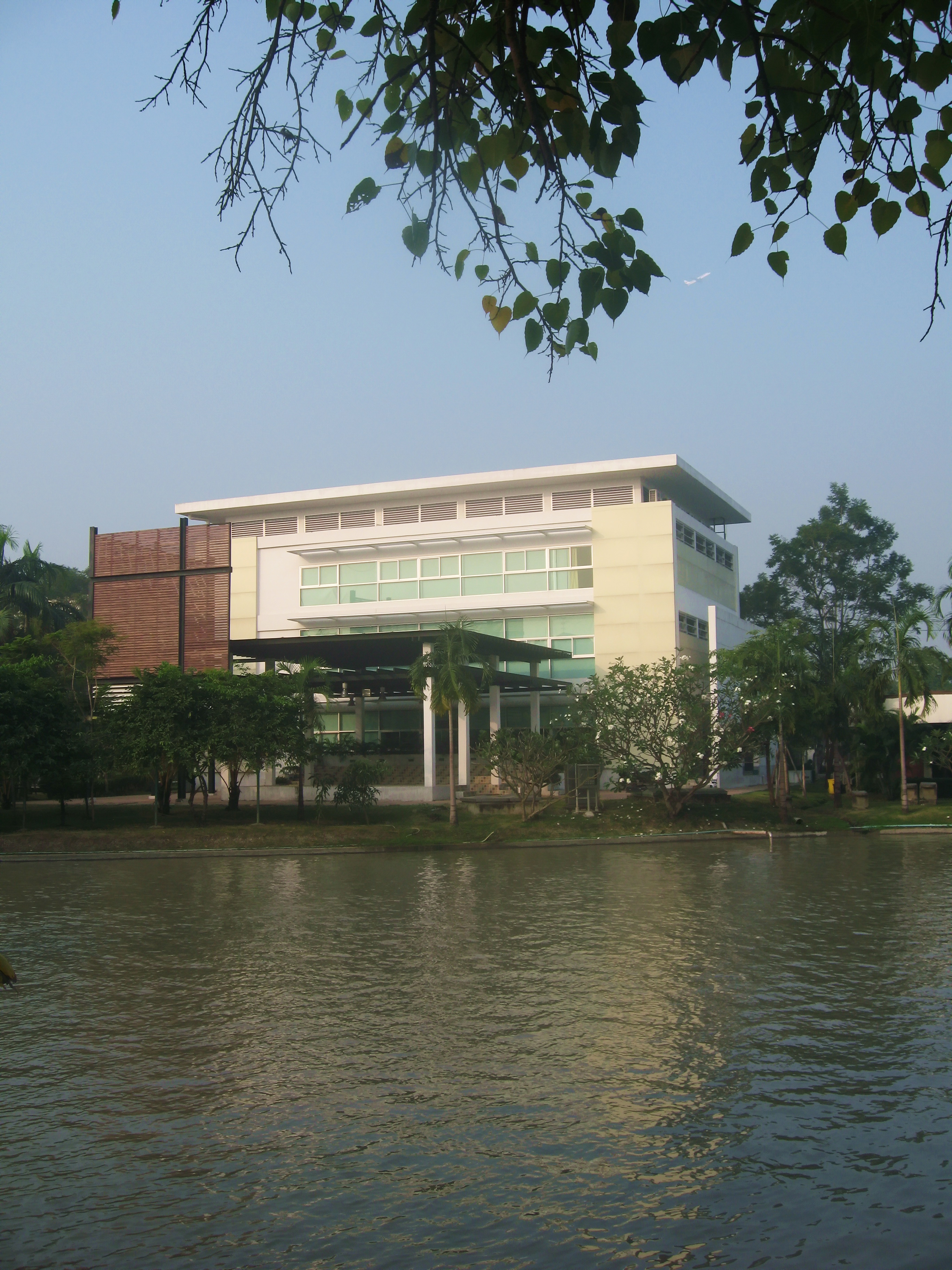
The lake and Lat Krabang Public Library

== Park components ==
The art of garden decoration and tree training on toothbrush trees (Streblus asper) and Fukien tea trees (Ehretia microphylla). To be various animal shapes is spectacular. The decorated and trained trees look like the garden zoo with plenty of animals, which is dazzling and beautiful in combination with the green and freshness of other plants. Inside the park, there are multi-purpose grounds, pavilions, an artificial lake, a swimming pool, Lat Krabang Public Library and Lat Krabang Young Centre.

The park has a total area of 50 rai (about 19.76 acres).

== Location ==
Phra Nakhon Park is on the Lat Krabang Road, (Note: Continuation route of On Nut Road.) Lat Krabang Subdistrict, Lat Krabang District, Bangkok. The opposite side is Chalong Krung Road, that leads to King Mongkut's Institute of Technology Ladkrabang (KMITL) and Phra Chom Klao Railway Halt.
