= 2006 Bangkok local elections =

Local elections in Thailand

Elections for local councils in Bangkok were held in 2006.

The first batch of elections took place on 30 April 2006 for all seats on the district councils of 14 districts in the north and east of the city.

In the second phase of voting held on 23 July 2006, the District Council seats for the remaining 36 districts, along with all 57 seats on the Bangkok Metropolitan Council, were up for election. Local elections follow a four-year cycle, and the 2006 elections are a follow-on from the 2002 elections.

== April elections ==
=== 14 District Council elections ===
Elections for district council in Bang Kapi, Bang Khen, Bueng Kum, Chatuchak, Don Mueang, Khan Na Yao, Khlong Sam Wa, Lak Si, Lat Krabang, Lat Phrao, Min Buri, Sai Mai, Saphan Sung and Wang Thonglang were held on 30 April 2006.

Turnout in the 14 districts was at 35.39 percent, with 482,688 voters exercising their right to vote. The Thai Rak Thai Party won 68 seats along with overall control of nine councils, while candidates from the Democrat Party won 27 seats, taking control of four councils. The Chart Thai Party got seven candidates elected and took control of one council.

==== Detailed results ====
(Democrat (DP) councils in blue, Thai Rak Thai (TRT) in red, Other in yellow, No Overall Control in grey.)

District Council	DP seats	TRT seats	Other seats	Result
Bang Kapi	7	1	0	DP gain from TRT
Bang Khen	0	8	0	TRT hold
Bueng Kum	0	7	0	TRT hold
Chatuchak	0	8	0	TRT hold
Don Mueang	0	1	7	Other hold
Khan Na Yao	0	7	0	TRT hold
Khlong Sam Wa	0	7	0	TRT hold
Lak Si	0	7	0	TRT hold
Lat Krabang	0	7	0	TRT hold
Lat Phrao	0	7	0	TRT hold
Min Buri	7	0	0	DP gain from TRT
Sai Mai	0	8	0	TRT hold
Saphan Sung	7	0	0	DP gain from TRT
Wang Thonglang	7	0	0	DP hold

== July elections ==
The second batch of elections took place on 23 July 2006. At stake were all 57 Bangkok Metropolitan Council seats as well as all district council seats in the 36 districts that did not hold polls in April.

Out of a total of 3,996,881 eligible voters, 1,676,373 voters came to vote, resulting in a voter turnout rate of 41.94 percent. This figure was up from the previous elections held in 2002, when only 35.53 percent of eligible voters turned out to vote.

=== Bangkok Metropolitan Council ===
The number of seats on the Bangkok Metropolitan Council was reduced from 61 to 57 for the 2006 election. In the last elections, held on 16 June 2002, the Democrats won 28 constituencies and Thai Rak Thai took 25, while the Prachakorn Thai Party, the Chart Thai Party and the Mod Ngarn Group each won two seats. The remaining seat went to an independent candidate.

The Democrats made big gains in the 2006 poll, winning 35 seats, giving them an absolute majority on the council for the first time ever. Thai Rak Thai managed to pull in only 18 seats, while the remaining four seats went to independent candidates.

=== 36 district council elections ===
Elections for 36 district councils were held concurrently with the elections for the BMA council.
