= RIS Swiss Section =

Swiss and German international school in Bangkok, Thailand

- Deutschsprachige Schule Bangkok โรงเรียนนานาชาติร่วมฤดีวิเทศศึกษา แผนกสวิส
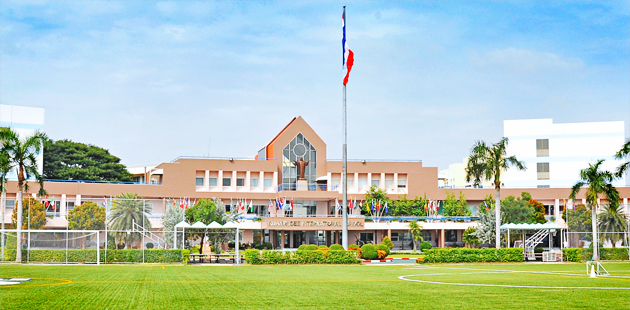
- Ruamrudee International School

Location
- 6/1 Ramkamhaeng 184 Road Minburi, Bangkok 10510
- Coordinates: 13.7830°N 100.7282°E

Information
- Type: Private school
- Established: 1963
- President: Fabian Reber
- Gender: Co-educational
- Website: ris-swiss-section.org

Ruamrudee International School Swiss Section (Thai: โรงเรียนนานาชาติร่วมฤดีวิเทศศึกษา แผนกสวิส, RTGS: Rong Rian Nana Chat Ruam Ruedi Withet Sueksa Phanaek Sawit), also known as Swiss School Bangkok (German: Schweizerschule Bangkok) or Deutschsprachige Schule Bangkok (DsSB), is a private not-for-profit international school operating under Ruamrudee International School in Minburi, Bangkok, Thailand. It offers grades from pre-kindergarten to grade 12 with a combined Swiss and German curriculum. The school currently has about 310 students. It is recognized by Germany and Switzerland as an official School Abroad, and it is subsidized by both countries’ governments.

== History ==
It was established in 1963. The school was founded that year by a Swiss teacher couple to facilitate the re-entry into the Swiss school system of the children of Swiss expatriates after their return to Switzerland.

In 1963 it was not possible to officially establish a foreign private school in Thailand. However, the Thai authorities considered the lessons private, and so allowed the school to operate. In 1972, the school's growth required it to relocate to a larger building at Sukumvit Soi 19/21, funded by grant money from Switzerland. Thai authorities began to pressure the school after 1977 media accounts about illegal foreign schools in Thailand. With the help of the Thai Ministry of Education, a sustainable solution was found in 1982: The Swiss school became part of Ruamrudee International School (RIS). As part of the merger, the school was required to move onto the campus of RIS, which it did in 1983, adopt a school uniform policy for students, and add the Thai language as a compulsory study subject.

The school began allowing students from other German-speaking countries to enroll in the 1980s. In the middle of the decade the school's decision-making committee began having members who were not Swiss, and representatives from the embassies of Austria and Germany began holding observer statuses in committee meetings. In 1991, the RIS (and with it the Swiss Section – Deutschsprachige Schule Bangkok) relocated to its current location. In 1993 the high school program opened after receiving approval from authorities in Lucerne. The English-language section opened in 2011.

== Facilities ==
RIS includes a boarding facility, "The Residence" or "Seelos Hall" for students in grades 7–12, catering to people living outside of the Bangkok area.
