= Mayhem! (film) =

- French film poster
- Directed by: Xavier Gens
- Screenplay by: Magali Rossitto; Xavier Gens
- Starring: Nassim Lyes
- Cinematography: Riwanon Le Beller
- Music by: Jean-Pierre Thaïeb
- Production companies: Same Player; WTFilms; StudioCanal
- Distributed by: StudioCanal
- Release date: June 28, 2023 (France)
- Country: France
- Language: French

Mayhem! (French: Farang) is a 2023 French action film directed by Xavier Gens. The film stars Nassim Lyes as Samir Barda who is serving his sentence for drug trafficking in a French prison. On his release at a trial work placement, he struggles to escape his criminal past as former clients track him down and accidentally kills one of them in self-defense. Five years later, going by the name of Sam, he rebuilt his life in Bang Chan, Bangkok. After his new wife is killed and their child is kidnapped, Sam goes out for revenge.

Gens partnered was the British action designer Jude Poyer to work on the film as they had both met on the set of the television series Gangs of London. Working on the film inspired him to develop an action film, which led to the development of Mayhem!. It was shot in France and Thailand.

Mayhem! was released in France during a period of rioting in France, following the killing of Nahel Merzouk by a policeman on June 27. Reviews compared the film as an equal to or unfavorable to Gareth Evans' earlier film The Raid (2011).

== Plot ==
Samir Barda, a former drug dealer, tries to put his criminal past behind him as he serves his sentence at the Fresnes Correctional Facility. Upon his parole, Samir is ambushed by his former accomplices when he refuses to help them. They leave, but not before threatening him that trouble may arrive when his former boss finds out. The next day, he received a job offer, the drug dealers return. Barda flees to a construction site, where one of the gang members dies accidentally after Samir pushes him off a building in self-defense.

Five years later, Barda has started a new life in Bang Chan, Bangkok, where he goes by the name Sam. He lives with Mia, a French-Thai woman, and her daughter from a previous relationship named Dara. Mia is pregnant with Sam's child, and the two are planning to buy a plot of land to build a restaurant. To make this happen, Sam works as a bellhop at a hotel and participates in rigged Muay Thai fights. The authorities refuse to grant the couple the plot of land after a man named Narong makes a higher offer. Hoping to save the project, Sam asks Sombat, his friend who works with Mia, to set him up with Narong, despite his reputation as a criminal. Narong turns out to be a French expat and agrees to give up the land in exchange for a favor: smuggling drugs through the airport where Sam greets tourists. Sam agrees, but on the day of the operation, Narong's accomplice is discovered, and Sam flees, pursued by the police. Back at home, Sam tries to save his family, but is seriously injured by Narong's men leaving Mia dead, and Dara kidnapped.

Rescued at the last minute from his burning house by his boxing coach Hansa, Sam plots his revenge. Sombat tries to talk him out of it, but Sam tracks down the henchmen and kills them. He learns that Dara is still alive but has been taken to Bangkok. Sombat, meanwhile, chooses to flee, while Hansa agrees to help Sam. Upon arriving in the capital, Sam uncovers new information at a brothel that harbors child prostitution. The two men head to a frozen food factory where Narong is smuggling drugs. Numerous fights ensue, and Sam frees the employees, who tell him that the children have already been taken away by boat. Battered after further clashes, Sam makes his way to Narong's office. The drug lord laughs as he explains that Nara was never sold, but entrusted to Sombat. He learns that Narong is a friend of the leader of Sam's former gang, who wants to kill him following the death of his brother, who Sam had pushed off a building earlier to his death earlier. On the verge of being strangled to death, Samir kills Narong and finds Hansa.

== Cast ==
- Nassim Lyes as Sam
- Loryn Nounay
- Olivier Gourmet as Narong
- Chananticha Chaipa
- Vithaya Pansringarm as Hansa
- Yothin Udomsanti as Kasem

== Development ==
Melanie Goodfellow of Deadline Hollywood described Mayhem! as a departure for Gens who had previously focused on horror films and comedies. The directors Xavier Gens said the film had "rebooted my cinema" and that he was "reinventing myself" with Mayhem!.

Among the film's crew was the British action designer Jude Poyer, who both initially met with Gens on the set of the television series Gangs of London. This is where the inspiration for Mayhem! came to him and while producing the film Papicha (2019) by his wife Mounia Meddour. Gens said that his work on Gangs of London along with Gareth Evans, the director of The Raid (2011) led him to wanting to make "a truly, big mainstream French action movie, that was badass and loved for that and could hold its own against international productions."

Mayhem! was shot in France and Thailand.

== Release ==
Producer Dimitri Stephanides of the French sales and production company WTFilms secured StudioCanal for international sales and French distribution, with Canal+ for the pay television and France Télévisions picking up the free-to-air rights. Prior to the premiere of Mayhem! at the Fantasia Film Festival, IFC Films acquired the rights for North America, Australia and New Zealand. Further rights were purchased to Japan by Klockworx, Latin America by Gussi, Germany by StudioCanal, Benelux by Dutch FilmWorks and Korea by Challen Film. The film had its North American premiere at Fantasia International Film Festival in Montreal on August 8, 2023, as Farang.

Mayhem! was released in France as Farang on June 28, 2023, where it was distributed by StudioCanal. By July 25, the film had drawn about 200,000 admissions in France, which gave it a rough gross of $1.5 million. Stephanides said that he and StudioCanal were pleased with the film's box office, especially as it coincided with a period of rioting in France, following the killing of Nahel Merzouk by a policeman on June 27. IFC Films released Mayhem! in theatres and on video on demand on January 5, 2024.

== Reception ==
On Metacritic, which uses a weighted average, Mayhem! was assigned a score of 55 out of 100, based on nine reviews from critics which indicatied "mixed or average" reviews.

English-language reviewers commented on the plot. Nick Allen of RogerEbert.com said the filmmakers were did not care too much about originality or constructs of the plot. Jeanette Catsoulis of The New York Times said that there was some consolation for a plot that "smothers its immigrant heart beneath a blanket of blood and sweat."

Other English-language reviewers commented on the action in the film, often comparing it to Gareth Evans' The Raid (2011). David Ehrlich of IndieWire found it "never approaches the operatic scale that made the fight scenes in those movies feel larger than life". Steven Scaife of Slant Magazine said that Evans' films he made in Indonesia were "notable for their elaborate choreography, Gens's action is less cleanly cut." Pete Volk of Polygon declared it the best action film of the year, saying it "once Mayhem! turns into a revenge story, it hits hard, emotionally and physically." with "The grounded approach to the movie's action design, combined with a steady ramping-up of gore, makes the fight scenes feel genuinely dangerous."
