= Pailin Chongchitnant =

Thai Canadian chef and cookbook author

- ไพลิน จงจิตรนันท์
- Born: March 4, 1983 (age 43); Hat Yai, Thailand
- Education: University of British Columbia (BS); Le Cordon Bleu
- Culinary career
- Cooking style: Thai cuisine
- Television shows: Pailin's Kitchen (2009–present) via YouTube; One World Kitchen (2015–2017) via Gusto
- Website: hot-thai-kitchen.com

Pailin Chongchitnant (Thai: ไพลิน จงจิตรนันท์) is a Thai-born Canadian Chef, YouTuber, and cookbook author based in Vancouver. Pailin hosts the website Hot Thai Kitchen, and a YouTube channel named Pailin's Kitchen featuring recipes that focus on Thai cuisine. Pailin’s recipes are frequently featured on Serious Eats and the Canadian Broadcasting Corporation.

== Early life and education ==
Born in Hat Yai, Pailin attended Ruamrudee International School in Bangkok. She moved to Vancouver in 2003 to attend the University of British Columbia, studying nutritional science. She later worked in professional kitchens and attended Le Cordon Bleu in San Francisco.

== Career ==
On 11 September 2009, Pailin launched a cooking show Hot Thai Kitchen (later renamed Pailin's Kitchen) on YouTube. As of 2024, the channel has over 2 million subscribers.

From 2015 to 2017, Chongchitnant was co-host on several episodes of Gusto TV's One World Kitchen, which is still available on various streaming platforms across the globe.

She has been the author of two cookbooks. Her first cookbook is Hot Thai Kitchen: Demystifying Thai Cuisine with Authentic Recipes to Make at Home (ISBN 978-0-449-01705-0) and was published in 2016 by Random House. This book received the 2017 silver award for Regional/Cultural Cookbooks in the Taste Canada Awards. Hot Thai Kitchen also received the 2018 Gourmand Awards in the category of Best Asian Cuisine Book that was published in Canada. Her second book is Sabai: 100 Simple Thai Recipes for Any Day of the Week (ISBN 978-0-525-61171-4) and was published in 2023 by Random House.

In May 2024, Pailin and Thai-American chef Hong Thaimee launched the Sabai Talk Podcast which focuses on Thai cuisine.

== Publications ==
- Hot Thai Kitchen: Demystifying Thai Cuisine with Authentic Recipes to Make at Home: A Cookbook (2016)
- Sabai: 100 Simple Thai Recipes for Any Day of the Week (2023)
