= Khanom sai bua =

Thai dessert

- Type: Thai dessert
- Place of origin: Thailand
- Region or state: central Thailand
- Created by: Thai people
- Main ingredients: Stem lotuses, rice flour, tapioca flour, thick coconut milk, shredded ripe coconut, white sugar (or palm sugar), salt, pure water and banana leaves

Khanom sai bua (Thai: ขนมสายบัว, pronounced [kʰā.nǒm sǎːj būa̯]; lit. 'lotus-stem snack') is a type of Thai dessert. It is regarded as another type of traditional Thai dessert that is hard to find and few people know.

Khanom sai bua is a steamed dessert similar to khanom fak thong (pumpkin cake), khanom man (steamed sweet potato cake), and khanom kluai (steamed banana cake). Main ingredient is young stem lotus (Nymphaea ampla or N. lotus) which has a unique texture and flavor.

Khanom sai bua is made of rice and tapioca flours mixed with coarsely sliced dried stem lotus (or pounded stem lotus) and coconut milk, and sprinkled with shredded coconut, and wrapped in banana leaves (or scoop into small ceramic cups like khanom thuai), before steaming for about 25 minutes is the last step.

This type of dessert is originated from a community that is adjacent to the waterway in the past. During the rainy season, lotuses flourish. These are used to worship the Buddha and are also an important ingredient in many recipes. Especially lotus stem also has aroma of rain which go well with coconut milk.

Khanom sai bua has a taste that is not the same as any type of Thai dessert, but is similar to a khao tom mat.

Currently, Khanom sai bua is produced and sold in a few places such as Bang Phut of Pathum Thani and Hua Takhe in east suburb Bangkok etc.

== See also ==
- List of Thai desserts and snacks
- List of steamed foods
