= Hong Thaimee =

Ngamprom "Hong" Thaimee (Thai: งามพร้อม "หงส์" ไทยมี) is a Thai-American chef.

== Early life and education ==
Born in Chiang Mai, Thailand, Thaimee was scouted as a model prior to her career at global pharmaceutical company Merck.

== Career ==
Hong opened Ngam in the East Village, New York City in 2012, serving modern Thai comfort food until 2019. In 2015, Thaimee published her first cookbook, True Thai: Real Flavors for Every Table. In 2020, Hong opened Thaimee Love, a pop-up that acquired a permanent restaurant space in SoHo in 2021. In 2024, Hong and fellow chef Pailin Chongchitnant launched the Sabai Talk Podcast, focusing on Thai cuisine.
