= Sam Wa Tawan Tok =

Sam Wa Tawan Tok สามวาตะวันตก
- Khwaeng
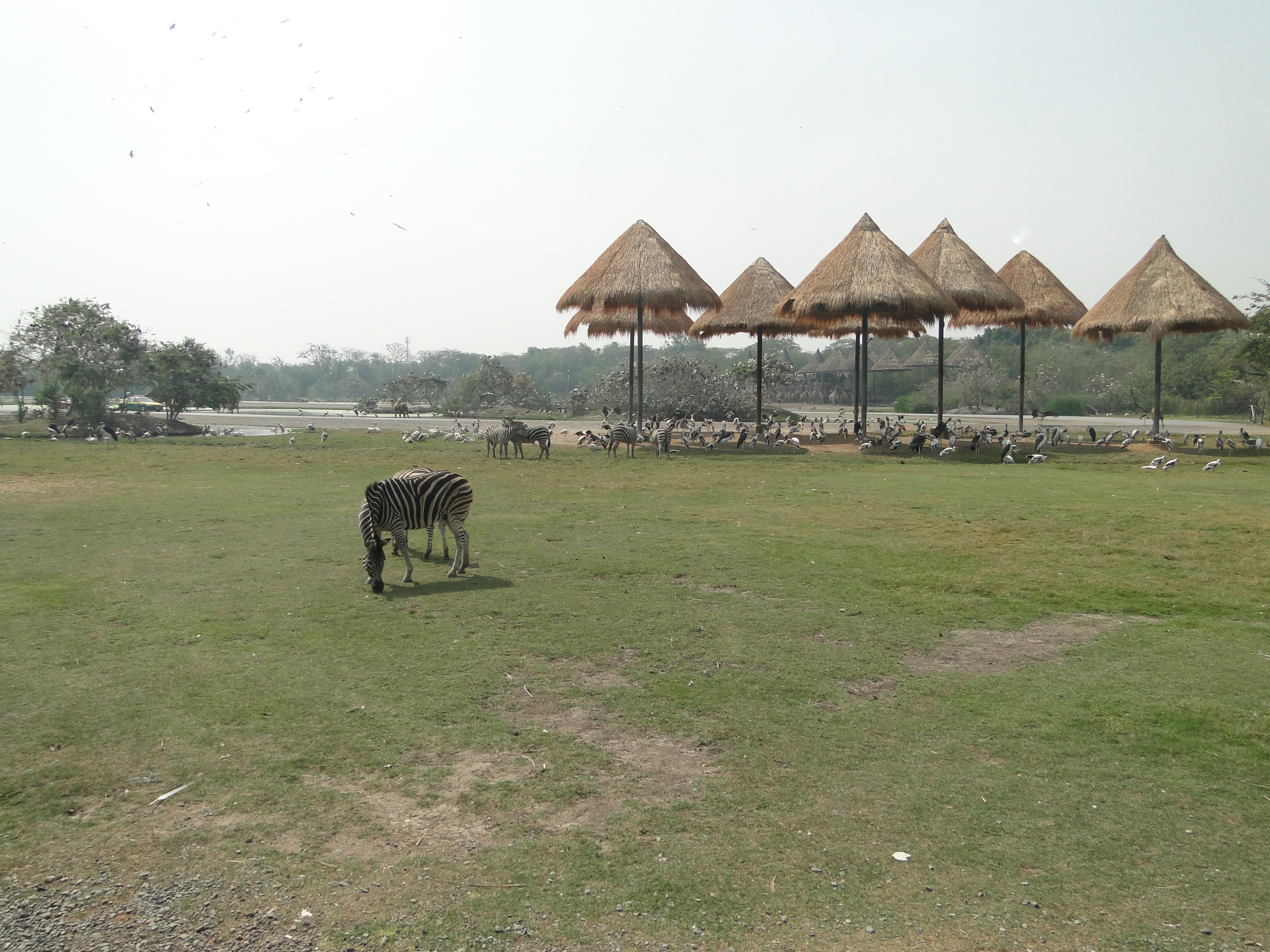
- Safari World

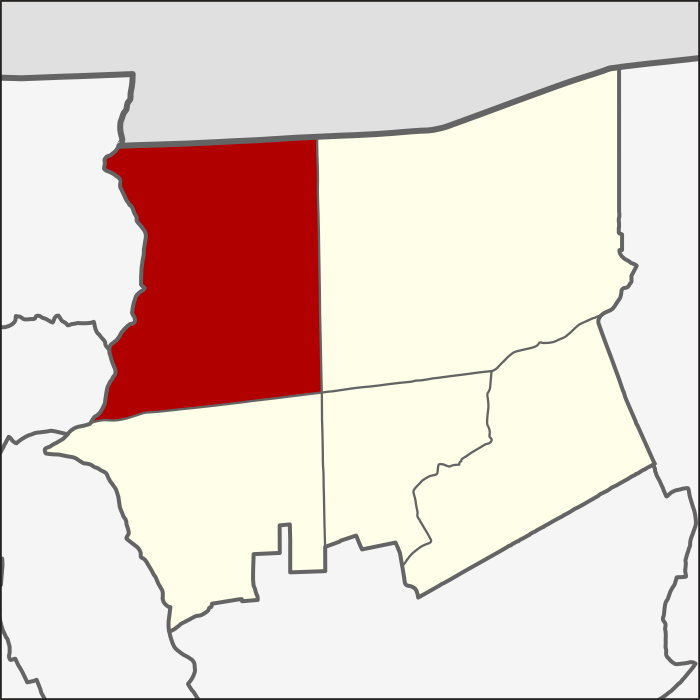
- Location in Khlong Sam Wa district
- Country: Thailand
- Province: Bangkok
- Khet: Khlong Sam Wa

Area
  - Total: 24.249 km^{2} (9.363 sq mi)

Population (2023)
  - Total: 62,864
- Time zone: UTC+7 (ICT)
- Postal code: 10510
- TIS 1099: 104601

Sam Wa Tawan Tok (Thai: สามวาตะวันตก, pronounced [sǎːm wâː tá.wan tòk]) is a khwaeng (subdistrict) of Khlong Sam Wa district, in Bangkok, Thailand. In 2023, it had a total population of 62,864 people.
