= Protpittayapayat School =

Coordinates: 13.7265°N 100.7845°E

Protpittayapayat school

Location
- Lat Krabang District, Bangkok, 10520; Thailand

Information
- Motto: Behaviour as the symbol, Knowledge as the treasure
- Established: 4 August 1949
- Founder: Loung Protpittayapaya /Sir. Leam Bunnark
- School board: Bangkok Education Service Area Office 2
- Authority: Office of the Basic Education Commission
- Teaching staff: 134
- Grades: 7–12 (mathayom 1–6)
- Enrollment: 3,217 (2008 academic year)
- Classes: 70
- Average class size: 45
- Student to teacher ratio: 21.89
- Colours: Purple and yellow
- Song: March P.Y. (Thai: มาร์ช พ.ย.)
- Website: www.prot.ac.th

The Protpittayapayat School is a public high school in Bangkok, Thailand.

== History ==
On 1 August 1949, Protpittayapayat School was established as a public high school in Lat Krabang District. The first building on the grounds was a house belonging to Lady Liam, who donated the land for educational purposes. The other buildings consist of two primary schools, a high school, and two universities. The school was named in honour of Lady Liam's late husband, Professor Propittayapayat.

== Programs ==
1. Science – Math (Gifted)
2. IEP (Intensive english program)
3. Health Sciences
4. Engineering and Architecture
5. Computer Technology
6. Modern Business Commerce
7. Tourism and Hospitality
8. Creative Communication Arts
9. Humanities for Thai Communication (Arts-Thai)
10. Humanities for Japanese Communication (日本語学科)
11. Humanities for Chinese Communication (Arts-Chinese)
12. Humanities for French Communication (Arts-French)
13. Law and Governance
14. Economics and Commercial Management
15. Sports and Recreation for Careers
16. Food Production Innovation and Management

== Gallery ==
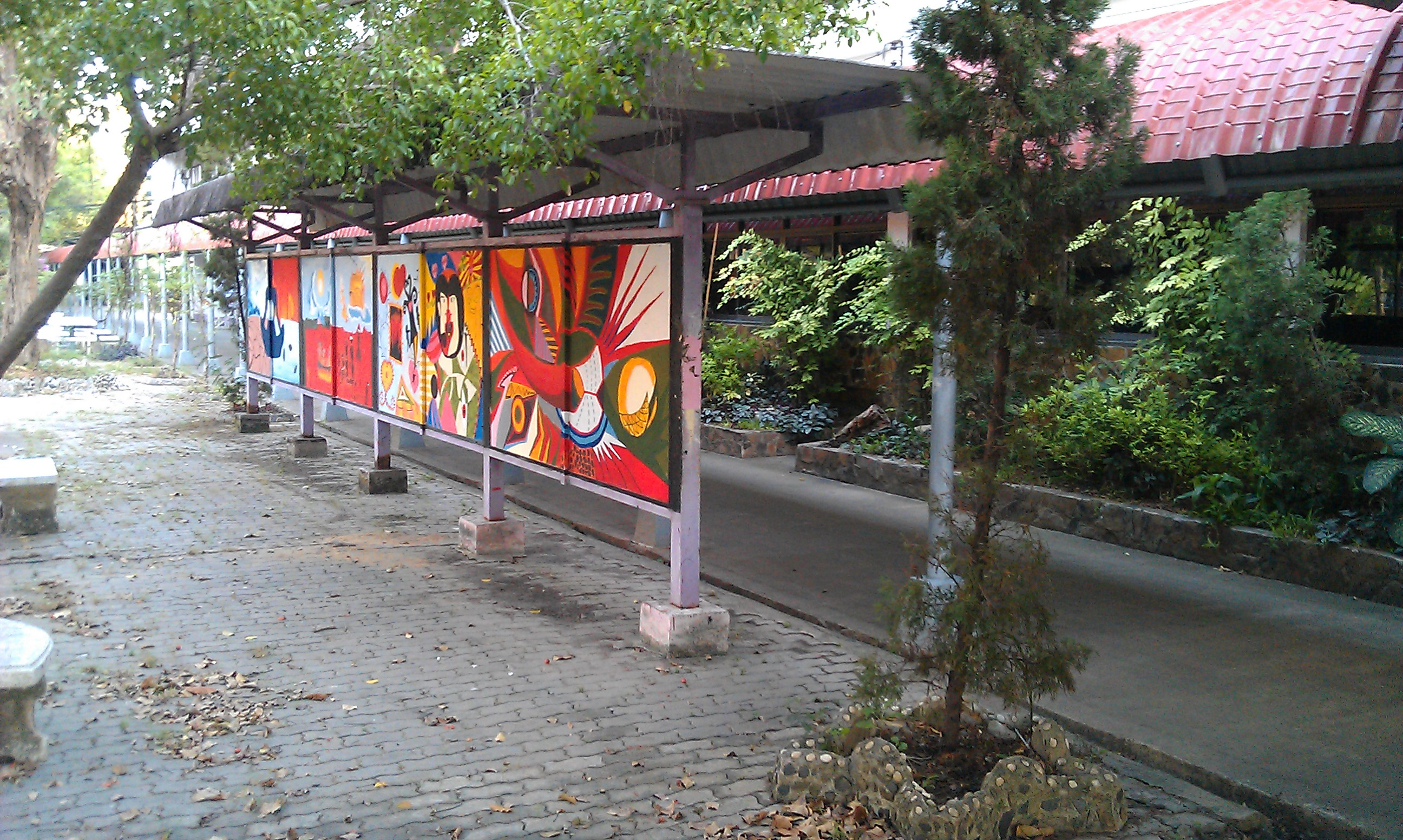
Protpittayapayat school

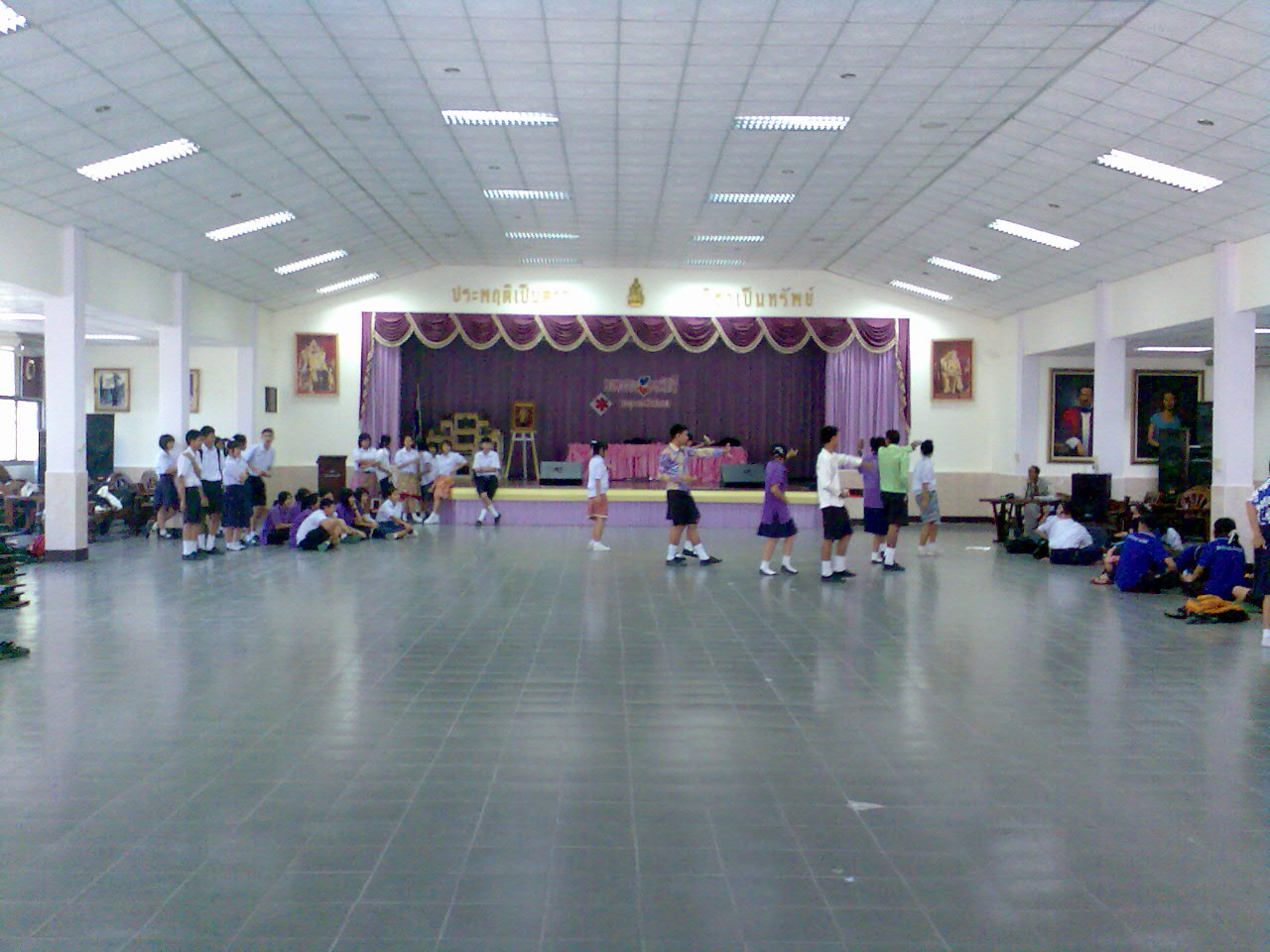
Auditorium

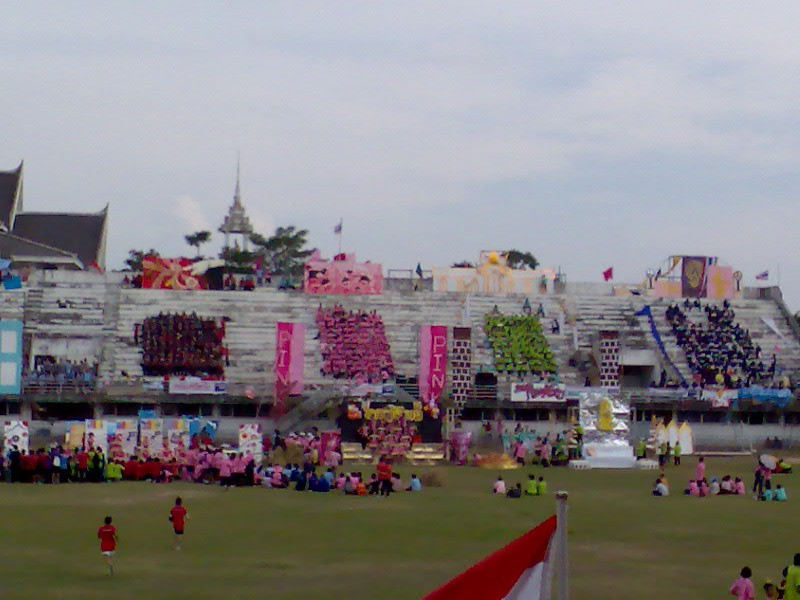
Stadium primary school

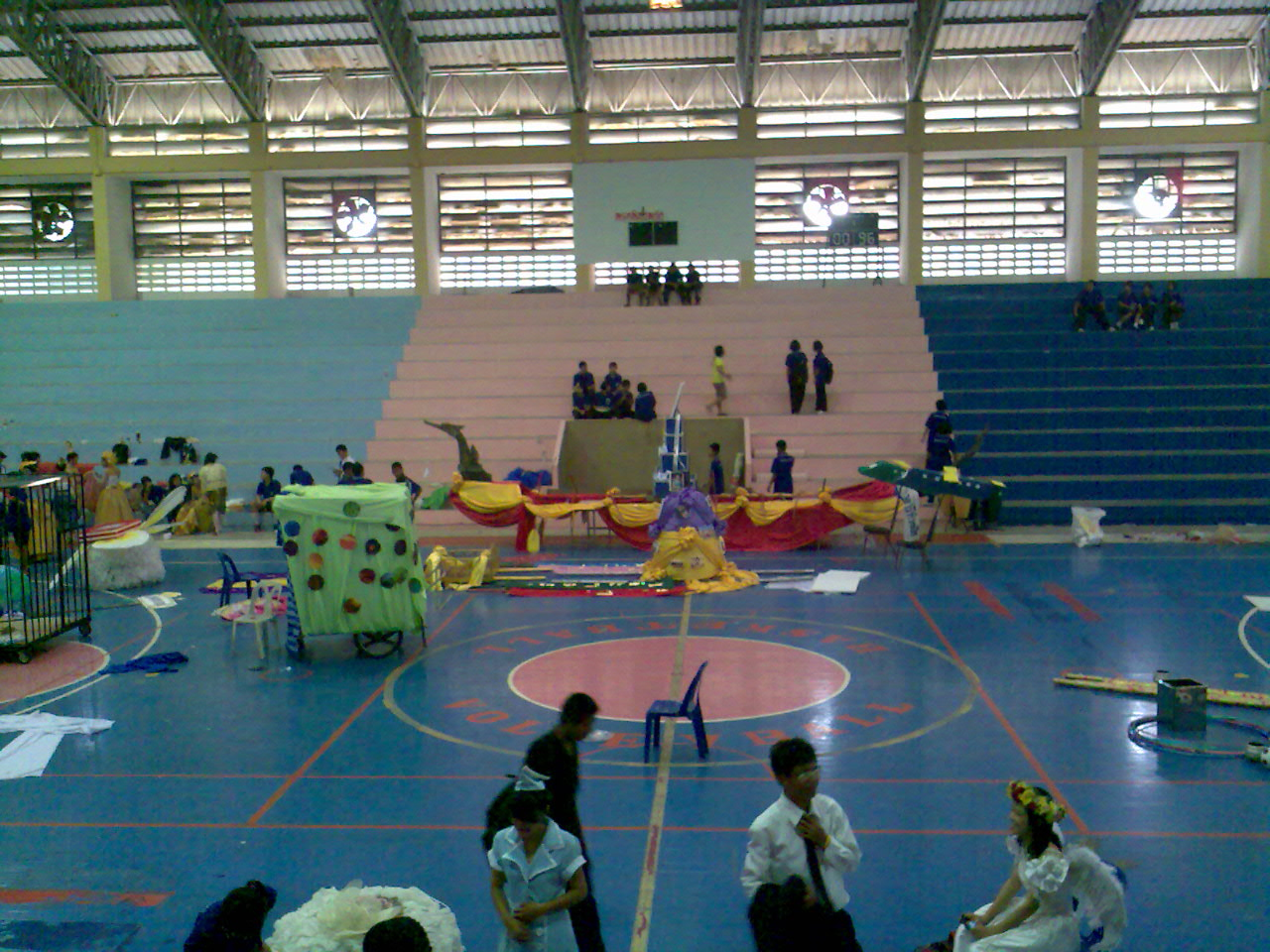
50 years Protpittayapayat Indoor Stadium.

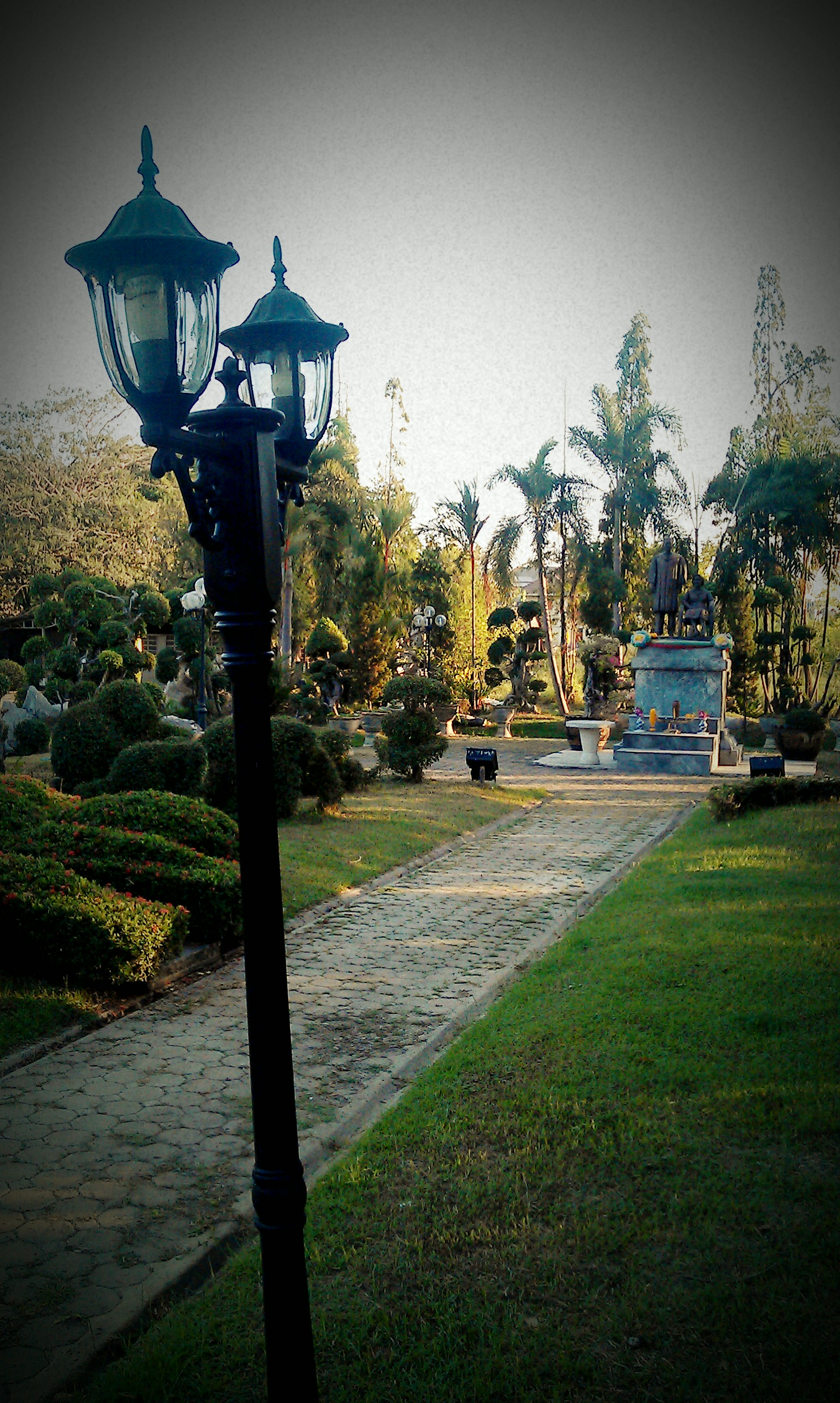
Loung Protpittayapaya /Sir Leam Bunnark Park

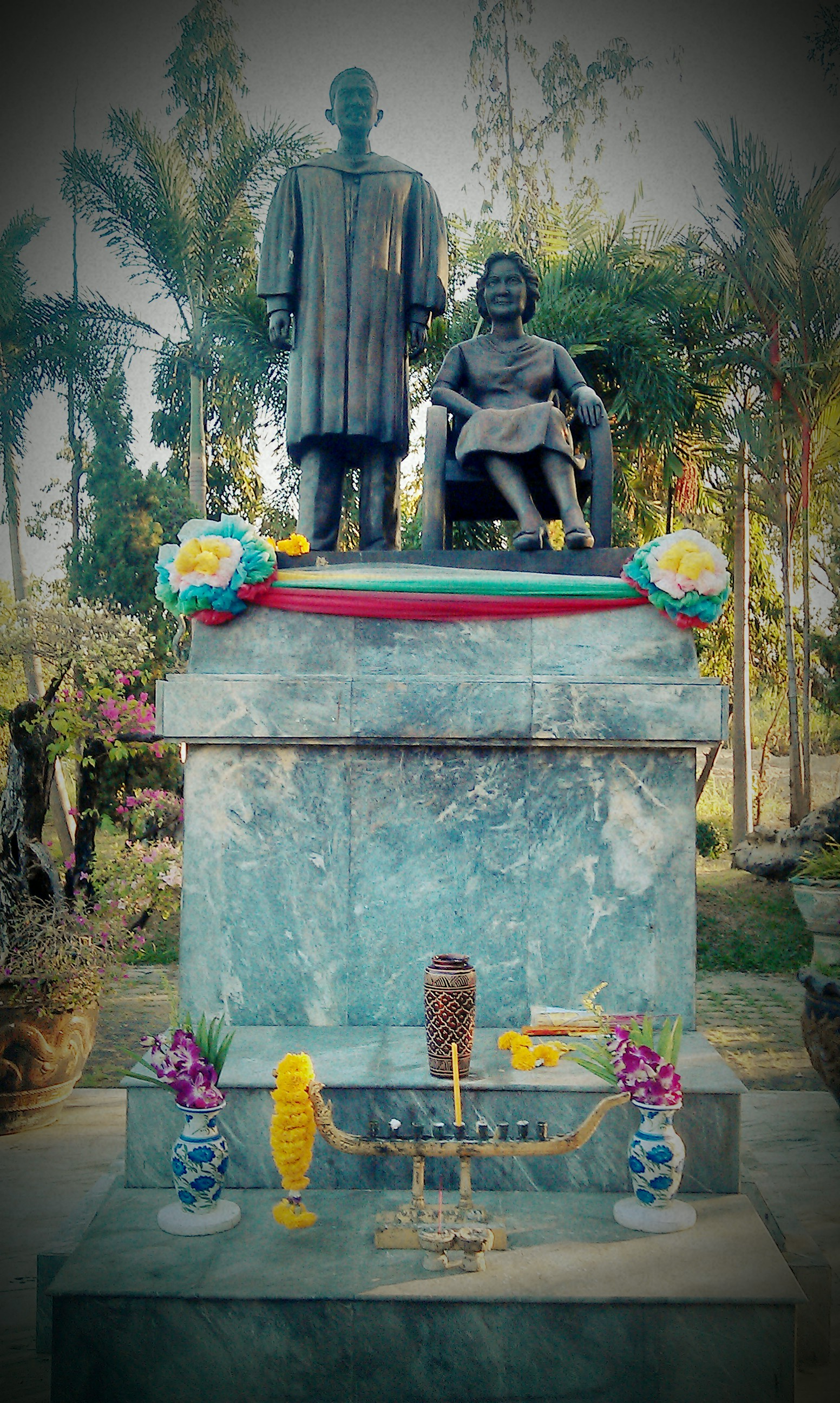
Loung Protpittayapaya /Sir Leam Bunnark Monument
