= Sam Wa Tawan Ok =

Sam Wa Tawan Ok สามวาตะวันออก
- Khwaeng
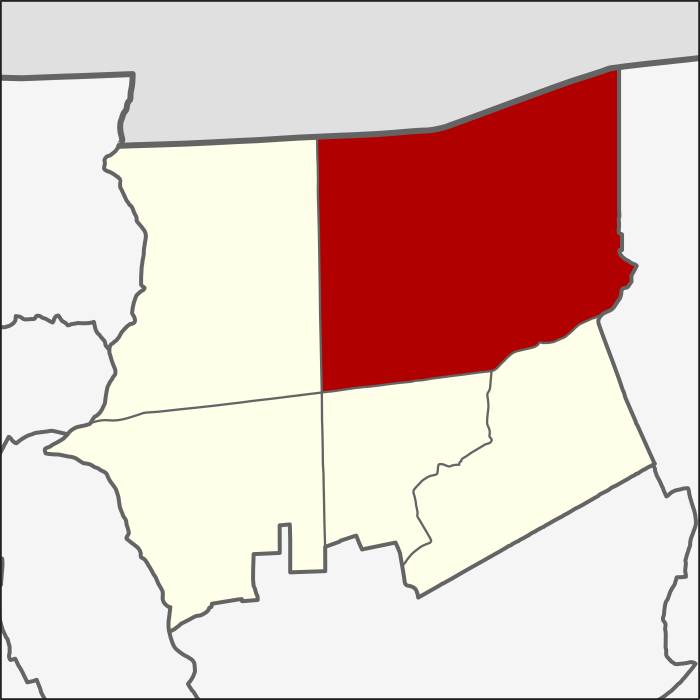
- Location in Khlong Sam Wa district
- Country: Thailand
- Province: Bangkok
- Khet: Khlong Sam Wa

Area
  - Total: 40.574 km^{2} (15.666 sq mi)

Population (2023)
  - Total: 27,025
- Time zone: UTC+7 (ICT)
- Postal code: 10510
- TIS 1099: 104602

Sam Wa Tawan Ok (Thai: สามวาตะวันออก, pronounced [sǎːm wâː tá.wan òk]) is a khwaeng (subdistrict) of Khlong Sam Wa district, in Bangkok, Thailand. In 2023, it had a total population of 27,025 people.
