= Aliza Napartivaumnuay =

Thai social innovator and businesswoman (born c. 1983)

Aliza "Alice" Napartivaumnuay (Thai: อลิสา นภาทิวาอำนวย; born c. 1983) is a Thai Obama Fellow social entrepreneur and community leader who founded Socialgiver in 2018. SocialGiver a worldwide organization and a Fellow of the Edmund Hillary Fellowship, a board member for both the JUMP! Foundation, SATI Foundation, and the Big Trees Foundation. She also led a COVID-19 relief effort through her Mysocialmotion movement.

== Early life and education ==
Napartivaumnuay was born in Bangkok to a Thai-Chinese family. She lived in Kolkata, Rome, Seattle, as a child and then the United Kingdom before moving back to Thailand permanently. She graduated from Ruamrudee International School in 2000. She went on to graduate with a Bachelor of Business Administration from Chulalongkorn University in 2004 and with a master's in supply chain management from the University of Warwick in 2005.

== Career ==
After finishing her master's degree, Napartivaumnuay worked for 10 years managing systems and supply chains. Napartivaumnuay is the co-founder, in 2015, and head of operations of SocialGiver, a worldwide group of lobal community of giving partners, social projects, and conscious consumers with a primary focus on integrating lifestyle shopping with increasing social positive social impact through the use of spare business capacity. Napartivaumnuay got the idea for SocialGiver while working at a children's center. SocialGiver's methodology is considered "groundbreaking" by the way it changes fundraising and how it connects customers with giving. SocialGiver donates 70 percent of its total revenue, 100 percent of profites, to charity. She is also the founder of Mysocialmotion, through which she led a COVID-19 relief effort.

One of Napartivaumnuay's inspirations for doing the type of work she does was the late king of Thailand, Bhumibol Adulyadej. Napartivaumnuay serves on the boards of the JUMP! Foundation, SATI Foundation, and the Big Trees Foundation, all focused on social change.

== Recognition ==
Napartivaumnuay has been recognized by being named a Fellow by the Obama Fellow in 2019 and the Edmund Hillary Fellowship in 2022. In 2022 Top 10 Thailand named her one of the top 10 businesswomen in Thailand.
