= Ruamrudee International School =

- โรงเรียนร่วมฤดีวิเทศศึกษา
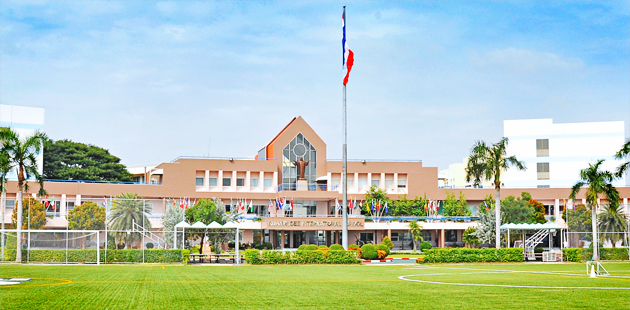

Location
- 6 Ramkhamhaeng 184; Minburi, Bangkok; Thailand; 13.782846°N 100.72813900000006°E

Information
- Type: International school, day and boarding
- Founded: 1957
- Founder: Redemptorist Fathers of Thailand
- CEEB code: 695300
- Director: Fr.Jittapol Plangklang, C.Ss.R
- Grades: P-12
- Gender: Coeducational
- Enrollment: c. 1,100
- Language: English
- Athletics: Basketball, soccer, volleyball, badminton, cross country, swimming, rugby sevens, touch rugby, softball, water polo
- Accreditation: Western Association of Schools and Colleges (WASC) (USA), Thai Ministry of Education
- Affiliations: IBO, CIS, ISAT, SEASAC
- Website: www.rism.ac.th

Ruamrudee International School (RIS, Thai: โรงเรียนร่วมฤดีวิเทศศึกษา, RTGS: Rong Rian Ruam Ruedi Withet Sueksa) is an international school in Min Buri District, Bangkok, Thailand for students from pre-school up to grade 12. It is incorporated under the laws of the Kingdom of Thailand as a non-profit organization. Founded in 1957 by the Redemptorist Fathers of Thailand, RIS serves a population of 1,400 students from around the world. Other campuses include Ruamrudee International School Early Years Campus (Phraya Suren Road, Ramintra-Kanchanapisek area), Ruamrudee International School Ratchapruek Campus (Bang Kruai-Sai Noi Road, Bang Krang, Nonthaburi) and Ruamrudee International School, Phuket.

== History ==
Ruamrudee International School (RIS) was founded in 1957 by a group of Redemptorist priests of Holy Redeemer Church with help from expatriate parishioners and a handful of local Thai students after a request by the Thailand Ministry of Foreign Affairs. The school began as the two classrooms for children of expatriates in the Holy Redeemer School and was given its current name when it moved into its own building in 1963. In 1966, it changed from the British to the American system. In August 1992, the school moved to a 14-acre (5.7 ha) campus in the suburban district of Minburi. The school has been ranked among the top five international schools in Thailand.

RIS was one of the first schools in Asia to be accredited by the Western Association of Schools and Colleges (WASC) and the Thai Ministry of Education. RIS is also a member of the East Asia Regional Council of Overseas Schools (EARCOS) and the Council of International Schools (CIS).

== Curriculum ==
RIS offers a college preparatory American curriculum. It is accredited by the Western Association of Schools and Colleges (WASC), the Thai Ministry of Education, and the Association of Indian Universities. RIS is also a member of the East Asia Regional Council of Overseas Schools (EARCOS) and the Council of International Schools (CIS). It is certified to award the International Baccalaureate diploma since May 1998, and the traditional US high school diploma. It also offers advanced placement credits. Being a Catholic school, Ruamrudee offers monthly mass on the first Thursday of each month from 7:30–8:00, as well a religion course in Middle and High school.

== Facilities ==
RIS is equipped with a 100-meters by 50-meters FIFA-certified artificial turf football pitch, an Olympic sized swimming pool and a normal pool, multiple gymnasiums, two libraries, a performing arts center, multiple mini-theaters, an art gallery, and computer and science labs.

=== Libraries ===
RIS features two main libraries, Elizabeth and Griffith. The two libraries contain more than 100,000 print, electronic, and audiovisual materials.

The Elizabeth library caters to PreK–grade 5 students.

The Griffith Library serves students in grades 6–12 and holds more than 50,000 books, 70 periodicals, and a range of online resources covering fiction, nonfiction, and reference materials..

=== Performing Arts Center (PAC) ===
The 300-seat, tiered Performing Arts Center (PAC) is where students present their band, choir, drama, and musical productions. The PAC is a space for showcasing student and faculty talent shows, the annual Easter and Christmas performances, and the TEDxYouth talks. The theater features a proscenium stage with mirrored practice rooms and two dressing rooms. The PAC has been used for the school's adaptation of musicals such as Bye Bye Birdie, Legally Blonde, and Once on This Island. Seasonal choirs showings are hosted throughout the year. Band performances are hosted throughout the year to present the progression band classes in school.

=== Mini-Theater (Redeemer) ===
The Mini-Theater, located on the 6th floor of Redeemer building, is a small movie theater used for showing of movies or videos. The theater capacity of 20 people limits it for in-class use rather than school-wide use.

=== School Location ===
Bangkok: Main Campus in Minburi Campus: (RIS)
RUAMRUDEE INTERNATIONAL SCHOOL EARLY YEARS CAMPUS: Ramintra-Kanchanapisek: (RISE)
RIS Ratchapruek: (RISR)
RIS Phuket: (RISP)

RIS has a total of four Campus during 2022

== Notable students or alumni ==
- Jensen Huang — founder and former CEO of Nvidia
- Golf & Mike — singer and actor
- Nicole Theriault — singer
- Cris Horwang — actress
- Pailin Chongchitnant — chef and YouTuber
- Aliza Napartivaumnuay — social and business innovator
- Rirkrit Tiravanija — artist
- Phuwin Tangsakyuen — actor
- Pharita Boonpakdeethaveeyod — singer, model, and member of South Korean girl group BabyMonster
