= Sai Kong Din =

Sai Kong Din ทรายกองดิน
- Khwaeng
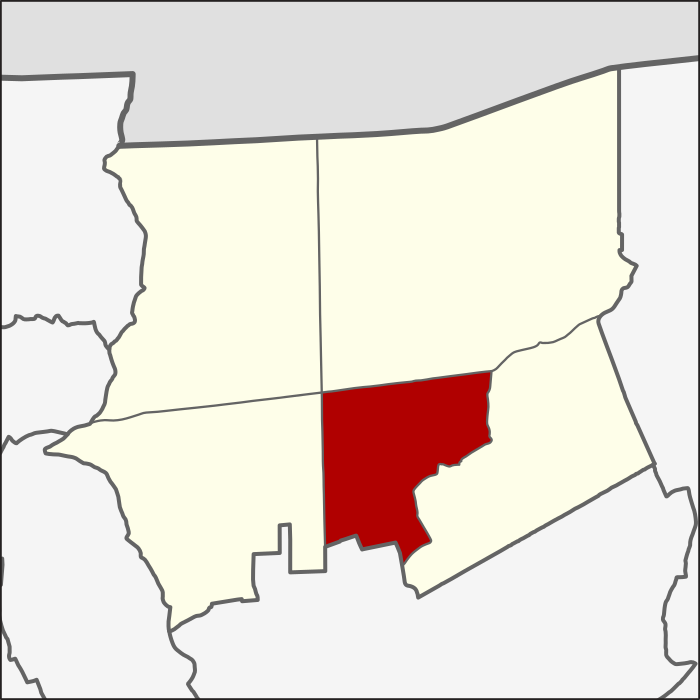
- Location in Khlong Sam Wa District
- Country: Thailand
- Province: Bangkok
- Khet: Khlong Sam Wa

Area
  - Total: 11.396 km^{2} (4.400 sq mi)

Population (2020)
  - Total: 13,117
- Time zone: UTC+7 (ICT)
- Postal code: 10510
- TIS 1099: 104604

Sai Kong Din (Thai: ทรายกองดิน, pronounced [sāːj kɔ̄ːŋ dīn]) is a khwaeng (subdistrict) of Khlong Sam Wa District, in Bangkok, Thailand. In 2020, it had a total population of 13,117 people.
