= Min Buri district =

Min Buri เขตมีนบุรี
- Khet
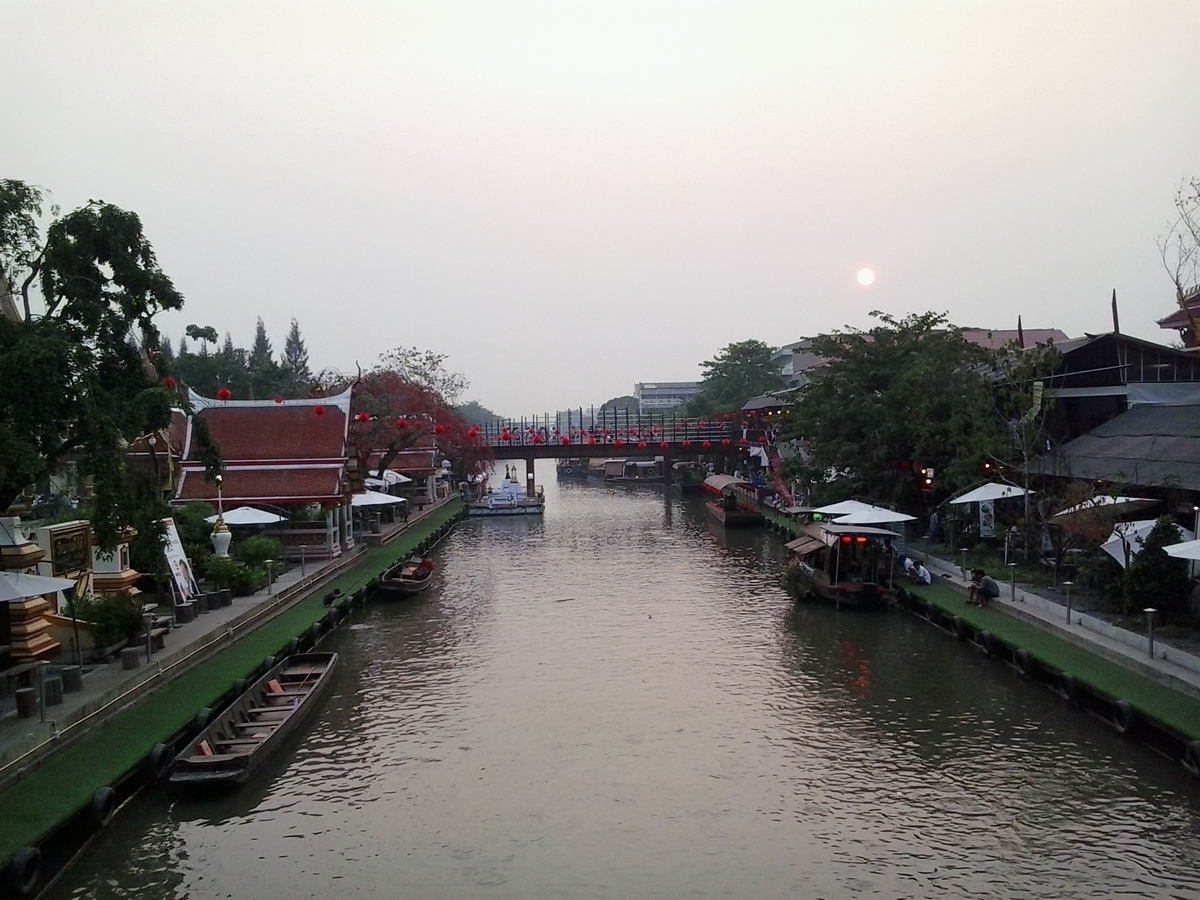
- Khlong Saen Saep in the area of Khwan Riam Floating Market at sundown

- Khet location in Bangkok
- Coordinates: 13°48′50″N 100°44′53″E
- Country: Thailand
- Province: Bangkok
- Seat: Min Buri
- Khwaeng: 2

Area
  - Total: 63.645 km^{2} (24.573 sq mi)

Population (2017)
  - Total: 141,750
  - Density: 2,227.19/km^{2} (5,768.4/sq mi)
- Time zone: UTC+7 (ICT)
- Postal code: 10510
- Geocode: 1010

Min Buri (Thai: มีนบุรี, pronounced [mīːn būrīː]) is one of the 50 districts (khet) of Bangkok, Thailand. It is bounded by other Bangkok districts (from north clockwise): Khlong Sam Wa, Nong Chok, Lat Krabang, Saphan Sung, and Khan Na Yao. Min Buri is the fifth largest district in Bangkok.

== History ==
The district was once a province established in 1901 during the reign of King Chulalongkorn. It consisted of Khlong Sam Wa district, Saen Saep district, Nong Chok district, and Chia Radap District (เจียรดับ). The name Min Buri (meaning 'city of fish') was chosen to go with the existing Thanyaburi province (meaning 'city of rice'). Economic problems during 1930-1931 caused the government to disband various organizations to reduce expenses. Min Buri Province was eliminated and turned into amphoe (district) Min Buri and Lat Krabang district of Bangkok, and Nong Chok district of Chachoengsao province. In 1957 part of Saen Saep subdistrict of Lat Krabang was transferred to Min Buri. In 1997, the northern part of Min Buri was split off to form the new Khlong Sam Wa District.

== Administration ==
The district is divided into two sub-districts (khwaeng).

No.	Name	Thai	Area (km^{2})	Map
1.	Min Buri	มีนบุรี	28.459	Map
2.	Saen Saep	แสนแสบ	35.186	Map
Total			63.645	Map

== District council ==
The district council for Min Buri has seven members, who each serve four-year terms. Elections were last held on 30 April 2006. The results were as follows:

- Democrat Party: seven seats

== Places ==
=== Museums ===
- Min Buri Local Museum (Formerly Min Buri City Hall)
- Small Barge Museum

=== Markets ===
- Min Buri Old Market
- Chatuchak Weekend Market 2, Min Buri
- Khwan Riam Floating Market

=== Public Park ===
- Rama IX Commemoration Park (สวนเฉลิมพระเกียรติ ร.9 มีนบุรี)

=== Temples ===
- Wat Bang Pheng Tai (วัดบางเพ็งใต้)
- Wat Bamphen Nuea (วัดบำเพ็ญเหนือ)
- Wat Saen Suk (วัดแสนสุข)

=== Education ===
- Kasem Bundit University Romklao Campus
- Minburi Discovery Learning Library
- Setthabutbamphen School
- Satrisetthabutbamphen School
- Minburi Technical College
- Kanchanaphisek Technical College Mahanakorn
- Minprasatwittaya School
- Bromsgrove International School Thailand (early years campus and primary and secondary campus)
- RIS Swiss Section-Deutschsprachige Schule Bangkok
- Ruamrudee International School

Former schools

- Josuikan Bangkok International School – Closed in 2024

=== Sports ===
- 72nd Anniversary Stadium

=== Industrial estate ===
- Bangchan Industrial Estate
