= Saen Saep subdistrict =

Saen Saep แสนแสบ
- Khwaeng
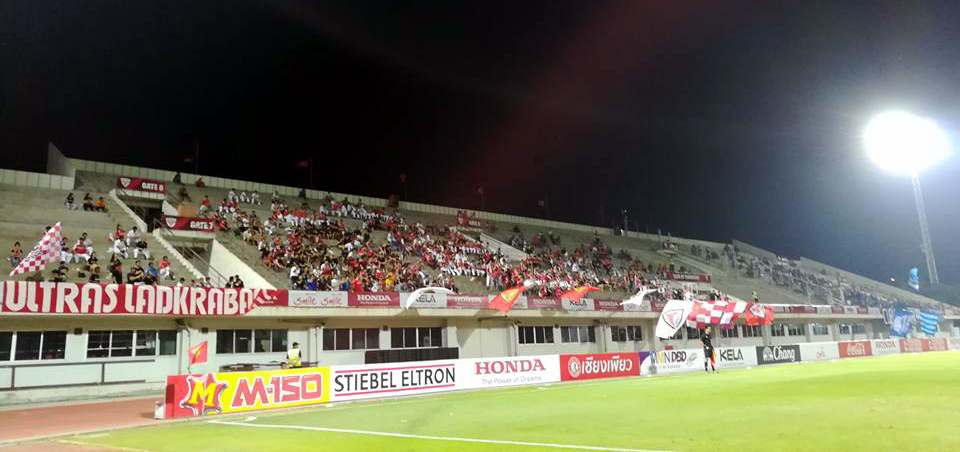
- 72nd Anniversary Stadium

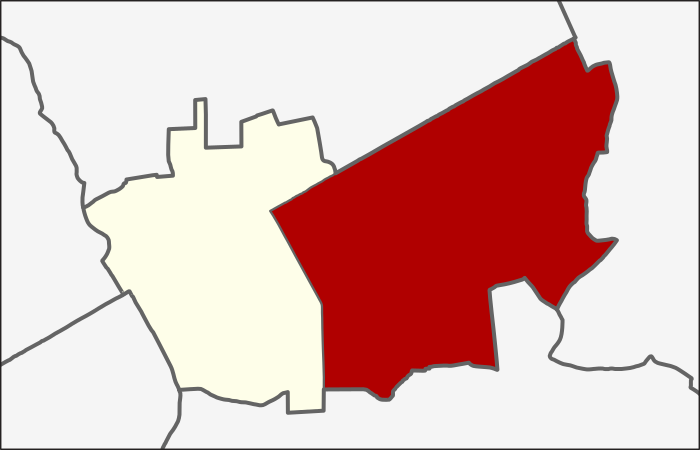
- Location in Min Buri District
- Country: Thailand
- Province: Bangkok
- Khet: Min Buri

Area
  - Total: 35.186 km^{2} (13.585 sq mi)

Population (2020)
  - Total: 45,185
- Time zone: UTC+7 (ICT)
- Postal code: 10510
- TIS 1099: 101002

Saen Saep (Thai: แสนแสบ, pronounced [sɛ̌ːn sɛ̀ːp]) is a khwaeng (subdistrict) of Min Buri District, in Bangkok, Thailand. In 2020, it had a total population of 45,185 people.
