= Khlong Sam Prawet subdistrict =

Khlong Sam Prawet คลองสามประเวศ
- Khwaeng
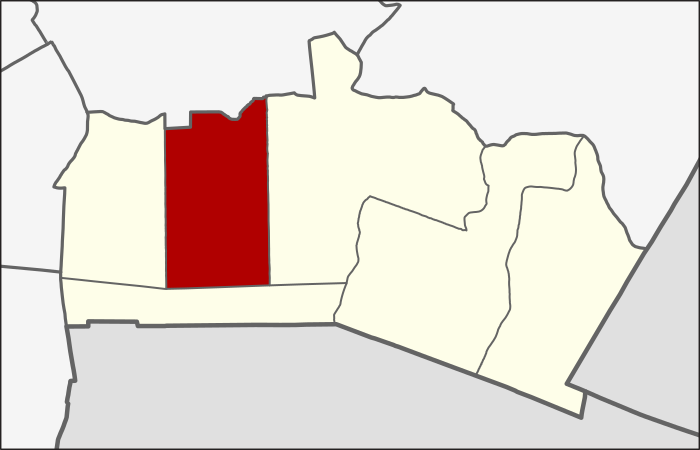
- Location in Lat Krabang District
- Country: Thailand
- Province: Bangkok
- Khet: Lat Krabang

Area
  - Total: 17.458 km^{2} (6.741 sq mi)

Population (2019)
  - Total: 15,915
- Time zone: UTC+7 (ICT)
- Postal code: 10520
- TIS 1099: 101103

Khlong Sam Prawet (Thai: คลองสามประเวศ, pronounced [kʰlɔ̄ːŋ sǎːm prā.wêːt]) is a khwaeng (subdistrict) of Lat Krabang District, in Bangkok, Thailand. In 2019, it had a total population of 15,915 people.
