= Khlong Song Ton Nun subdistrict =

Coordinates: 13.729726°N 100.718417°E

Khlong Song Ton Nun คลองสองต้นนุ่น
- Khwaeng
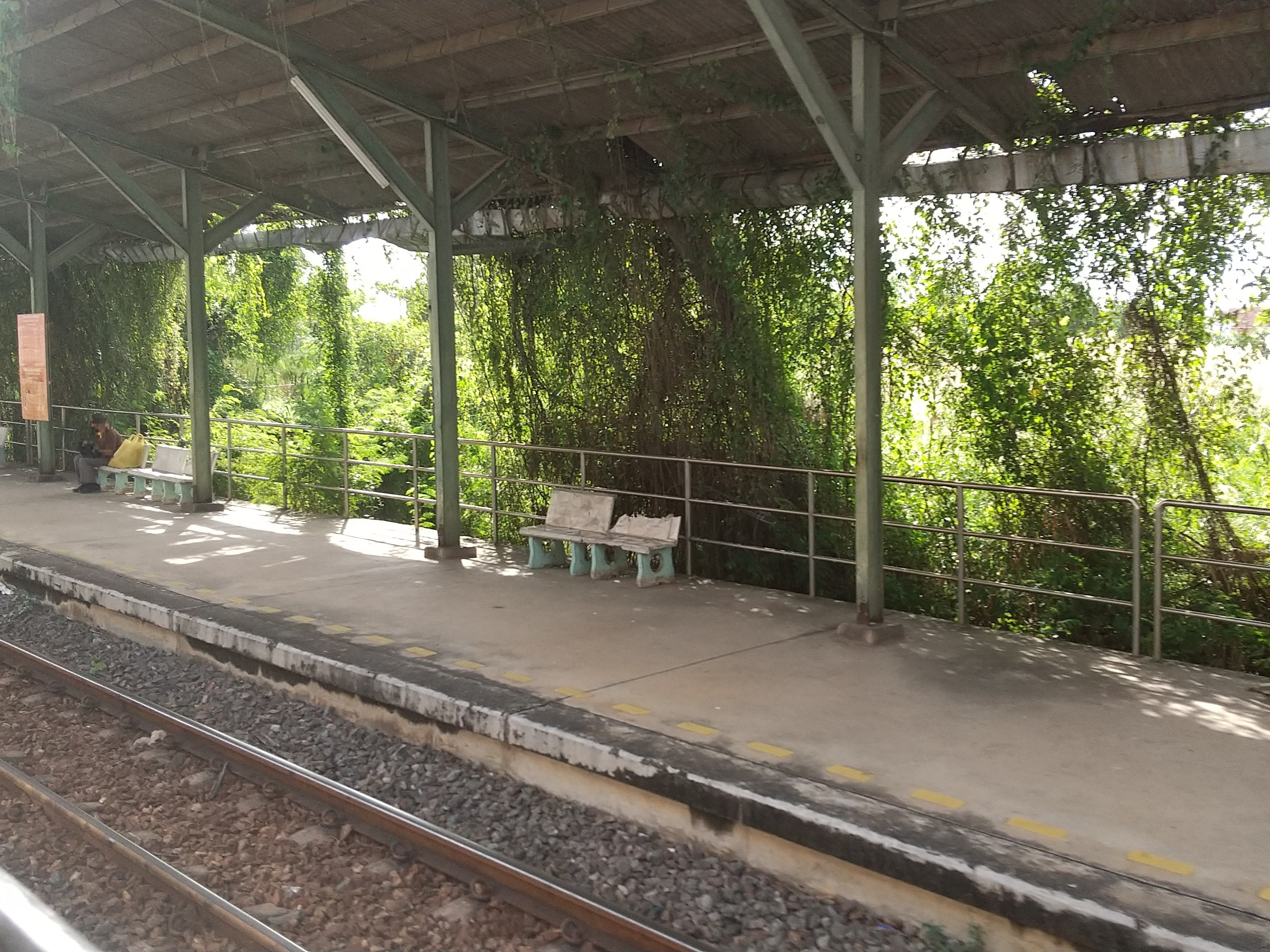
- Soi Wat Lan Boon railway halt, Khlong Song Ton Nun in late 2022

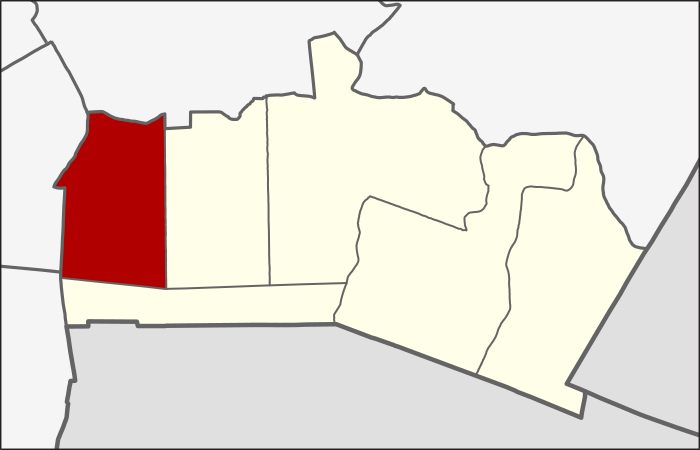
- Location in Lat Krabang District
- Country: Thailand
- Province: Bangkok
- Khet: Lat Krabang

Area
  - Total: 14.297 km^{2} (5.520 sq mi)

Population (2019)
  - Total: 68,026
- Time zone: UTC+7 (ICT)
- Postal code: 10520
- TIS 1099: 101102

Khlong Song Ton Nun (Thai: คลองสองต้นนุ่น, pronounced [kʰlɔ̄ːŋ sɔ̌ːŋ tôn nûn]) is a khwaeng (subdistrict) of Lat Krabang District, in Bangkok, Thailand. In 2019, it had a total population of 68,026 people.
