= Lam Pla Thio subdistrict =

Lam Pla Thio ลำปลาทิว
- Khwaeng
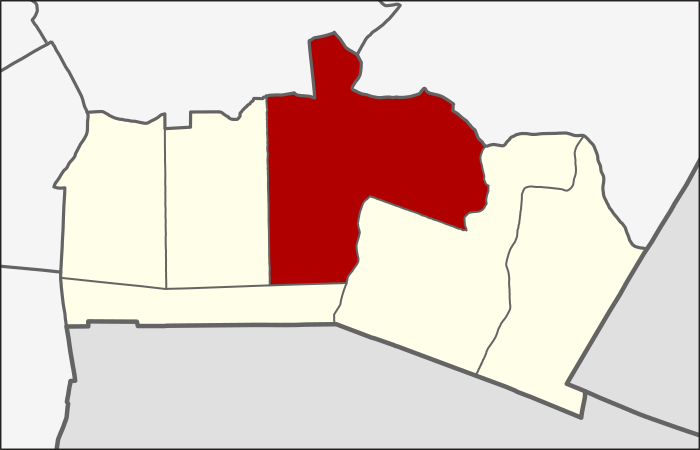
- Location in Lat Krabang District
- Country: Thailand
- Province: Bangkok
- Khet: Lat Krabang

Area
  - Total: 33.752 km^{2} (13.032 sq mi)

Population (2019)
  - Total: 24,878
- Time zone: UTC+7 (ICT)
- Postal code: 10520
- TIS 1099: 101104

Lam Pla Thio (Thai: ลำปลาทิว, pronounced [lām plāː tʰīw]) is a khwaeng (subdistrict) of Lat Krabang District, in Bangkok, Thailand. In 2019, it had a total population of 24,878 people.
