= Khlong Sam Wa district =

Khlong Sam Wa คลองสามวา
- Khet
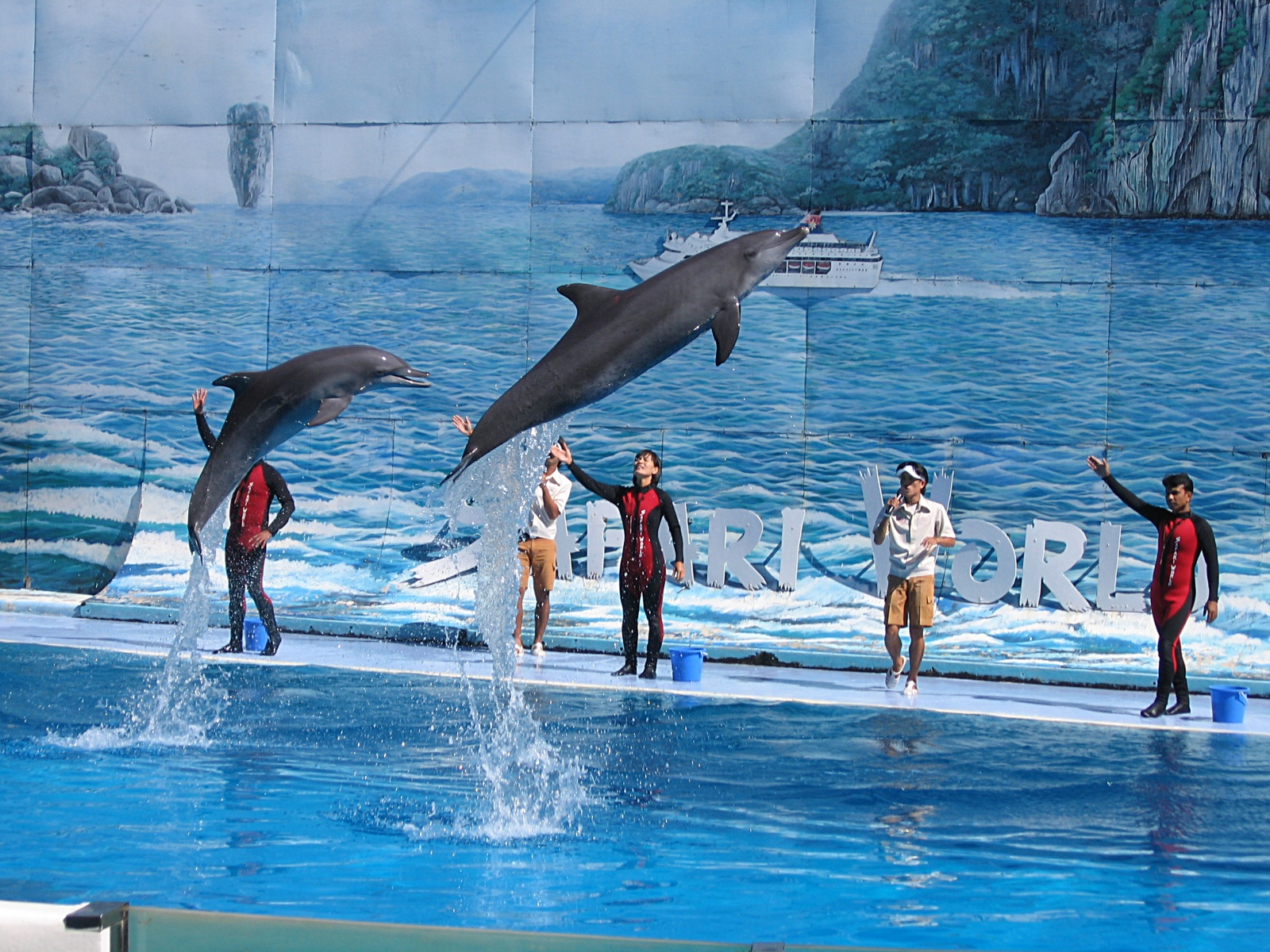
- Dolphin show at Safari World

- Khet location in Bangkok
- Coordinates: 13°51′35″N 100°42′15″E
- Country: Thailand
- Province: Bangkok
- Seat: Bang Chan
- Khwaeng: 5
- Khet established: 21 November 1997

Area
  - Total: 110.686 km^{2} (42.736 sq mi)

Population (2022)
  - Total: 209,120
  - Density: 1,889.31/km^{2} (4,893.3/sq mi)
- Time zone: UTC+7 (ICT)
- Postal code: 10510
- Geocode: 1046

Khlong Sam Wa (Thai: คลองสามวา, pronounced [kʰlɔ̄ːŋ sǎːm wāː]) is one of the 50 districts (khet) of Bangkok, Thailand. It is bounded by other districts (from north clockwise): Lam Luk Ka district of Pathum Thani province, Nong Chok, Min Buri, Khan Na Yao, Bang Khen, and Sai Mai of Bangkok. As of 2022, it had the highest population of all districts in Bangkok.

== History ==
Khlong Sam Wa was established as a district on 21 November 1997 by splitting from Min Buri. Khlong Sam Wa was the name of an amphoe (district) in Min Buri and hence the name is used as the district name. In 1947 when the area was still rural, the farming community of Bang Chan was chosen as a centre for Thai studies.

The name "Khlong Sam Wa" literally means "a khlong (canal) with a width of three wa" (about 5.94 m (19.5 ft). The name comes from a legal classification issued during the reign of King Rama V in 1891. At that time, any canal with a width of three wa or more was officially referred to as "Khlong Sam Wa." This legal designation later became the origin of the district's name.

== Administration ==
The district is divided into five sub-districts (khwaeng).

| No. | Name | Thai | Area (km^{2}) | Map |
|---|---|---|---|---|
| 1. | Sam Wa Tawan Tok | สามวาตะวันตก | 24.249 | Map |
| 2. | Sam Wa Tawan Ok | สามวาตะวันออก | 40.574 | Map |
| 3. | Bang Chan | บางชัน | 18.644 | Map |
| 4. | Sai Kong Din | ทรายกองดิน | 11.396 | Map |
| 5. | Sai Kong Din Tai | ทรายกองดินใต้ | 15.823 | Map |
| Total | | | 110.686 | Map |

== District council ==
The district council for Khlong Sam Wa has seven members, who each serve four-year terms. Elections were last held on 30 April 2006. The Thai Rak Thai Party won seven seats.

== Places ==
- Safari World
- Wari Phirom Park
- Wat Phraya Suren and Wat Phraya Suren Floating Market

=== Kip Mu ===
Kip Mu (กีบหมู [kìːp mǔː], lit. 'pig's hoof') is a neighbourhood in Bang Chan sub-district, widely known as a "labour market" because it serves as a gathering place for day labourers. Every morning, from around 5:00 a.m. until no later than 9:00 a.m., employers and contractors drive pickup trucks here to hire workers. The workers are available in various trades according to their skills, such as carpenters, painters, plumbers, welders, plasterers, or unskilled labourers. They line up along both sides of the road for almost 1 km (0.6 mi) to be chosen.
