= Thap Yao subdistrict =

Thap Yao ทับยาว
- Khwaeng
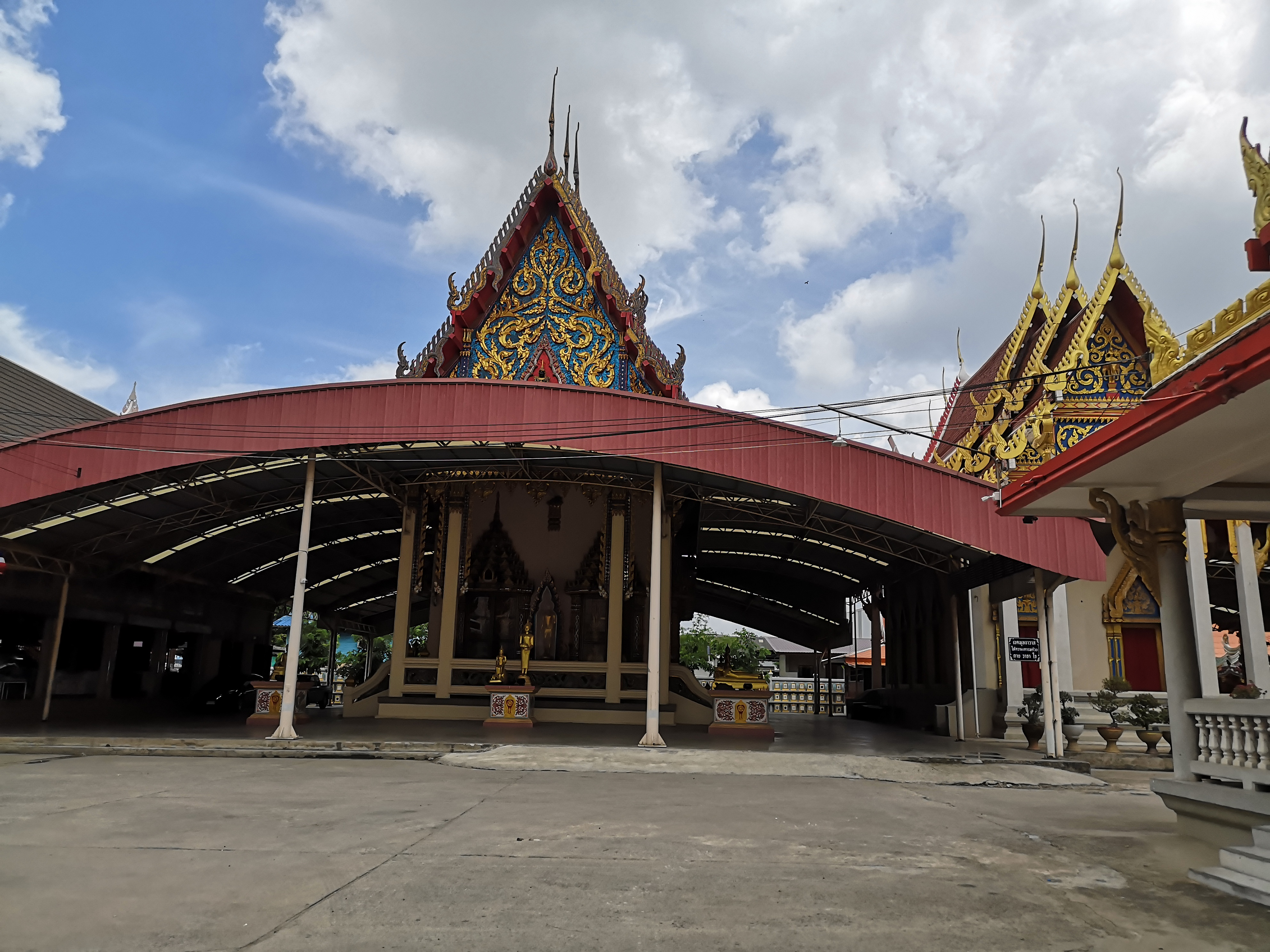
- Wat Phon Mani a prominent local temple

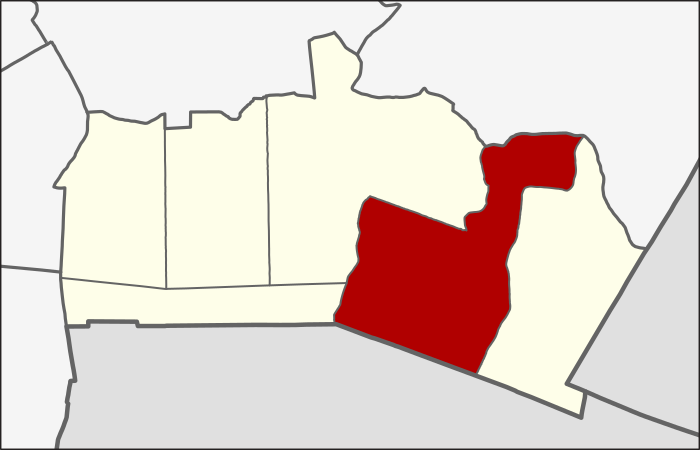
- Location in Lat Krabang District
- Country: Thailand
- Province: Bangkok
- Khet: Lat Krabang

Area
  - Total: 25.834 km^{2} (9.975 sq mi)

Population (2019)
  - Total: 30,426
- Time zone: UTC+7 (ICT)
- Postal code: 10520
- TIS 1099: 101105

Thap Yao (Thai: ทับยาว, pronounced [tʰáp jāːw]) is a khwaeng (subdistrict) of Lat Krabang District, in Bangkok, Thailand. In 2019, it had a total population of 30,426 people.
