= Bang Chan, Bangkok =

Bang Chan บางชัน
- Khwaeng
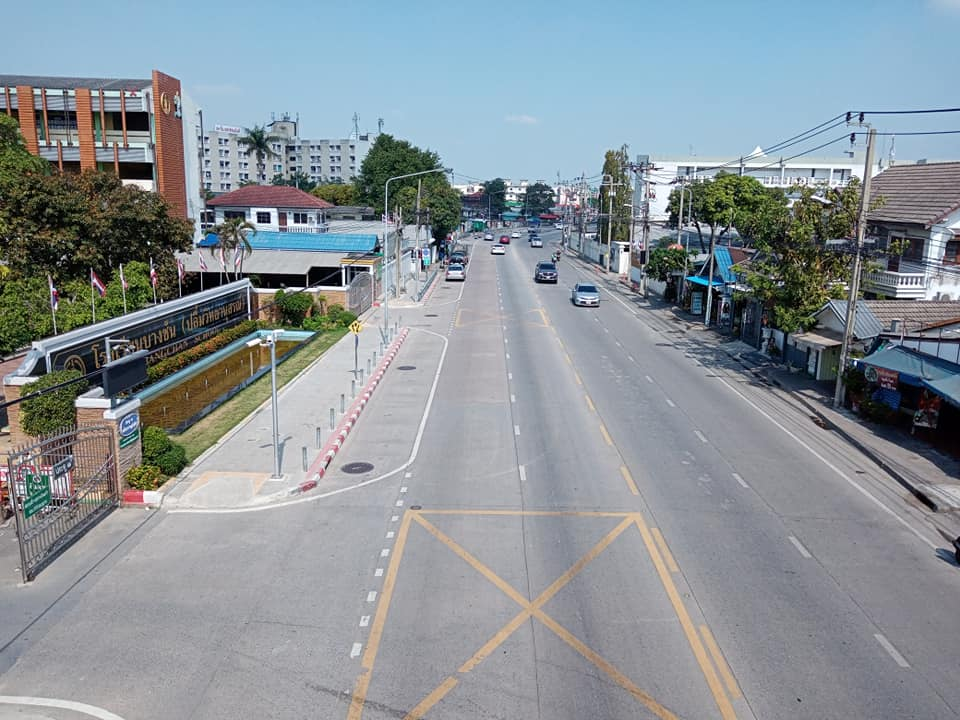
- Phraya Suren rd in the area of Bang Chan, late 2023

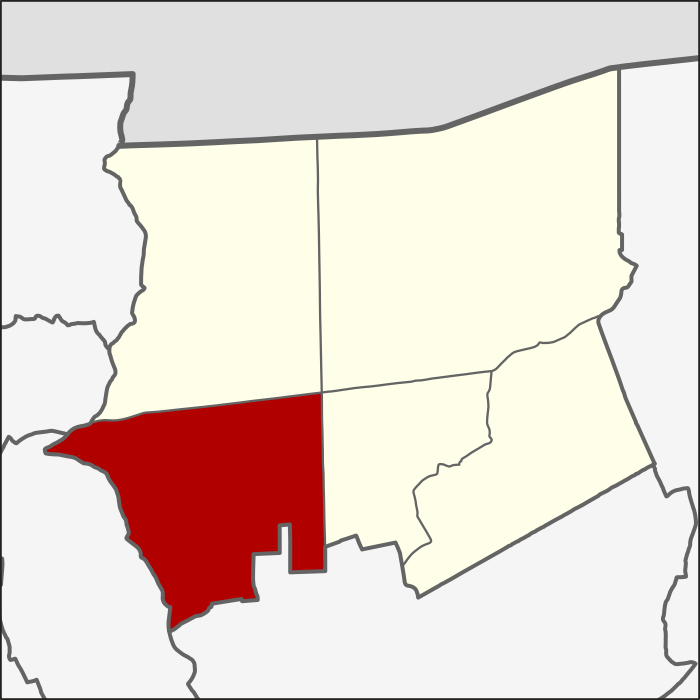
- Location in Khlong Sam Wa district
- Country: Thailand
- Province: Bangkok
- Khet: Khlong Sam Wa

Area
  - Total: 18.644 km^{2} (7.198 sq mi)

Population (2020)
  - Total: 88,936
- Time zone: UTC+7 (ICT)
- Postal code: 10510
- TIS 1099: 104603

Bang Chan (Thai: บางชัน, pronounced [bāːŋ t͡ɕʰān]) is a khwaeng (subdistrict) of Khlong Sam Wa district, in Bangkok, Thailand. In 2020, it had a total population of 88,936 people.
