= Khwan Riam Floating Market =

Floating market in Bangkok, Thailand

Coordinates: 13.8001°N 100.7100°E

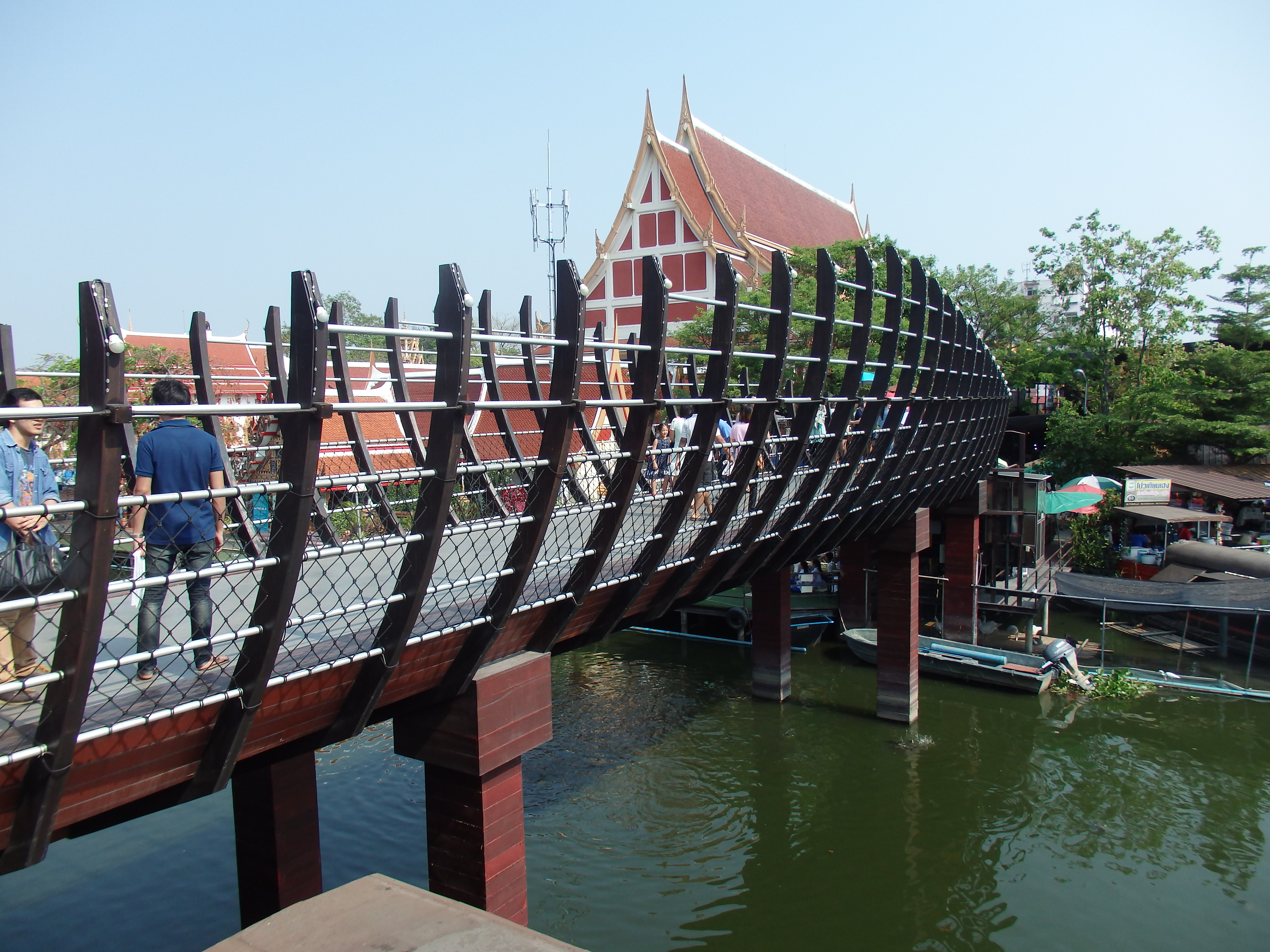
Thuss bridge of Khwan Riam Floating Market, it is regarded as a symbol and landmark of the market

Khwan Riam Floating Market (Thai: ตลาดน้ำขวัญเรียม, pronounced [tā.làːt náːm kʰwǎn rīam]) is one of the central floating markets of Bangkok, Thailand. It located between Soi Seri Thai 60 and Soi Ramkhamhaeng 187 in Min Buri District, eastern Bangkok.

The name of the market "Khwan Riam" comes from the name of main characters in Thai romance-drama novel titled Phlae Kao. Khwan and Riam are tragic lovers who are obstructed by their parents. Khwan Riam Floating Market is one of the newest floating markets in Bangkok. It opened in May 2012. It is open Saturday and Sunday and on public holidays from 7 a.m. – 6 p.m. It is divided into two parts by two temples, Wat Bamphen Nuea and Wat Bang Pheng Tai. Both were connected by concrete bridges and truss bridge (in picture).

There is a wide range of traditional food available, such as classic Boat noodles, Thai desserts and Isan food. Market women cook food in the little boats. There is also a water buffalo and rice farmer. People often photograph and ride the water buffalo. The market has good views of Khlong Saen Saep. Merit offering alms giving to monk procession on boat is a regular activity every morning weekend.
