= Lat Krabang district =

Lat Krabang ลาดกระบัง
- Khet
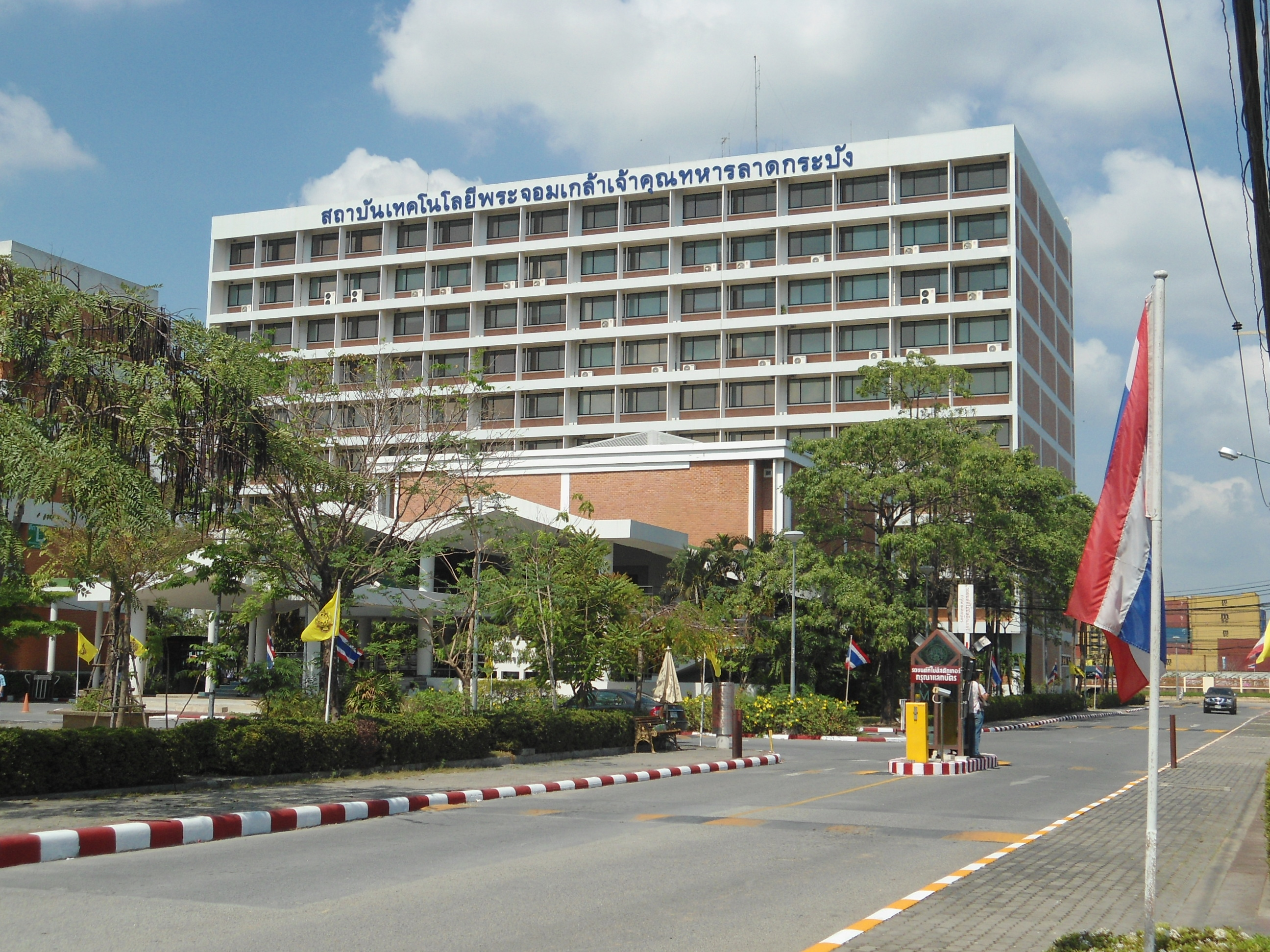
- King Mongkut's Institute of Technology Ladkrabang (KMITL)

- District location in Bangkok
- Coordinates: 13°43′20.34″N 100°45′34.81″E
- Country: Thailand
- Province: Bangkok
- Seat: Lat Krabang
- Khwaeng: 6

Area
  - Total: 123.859 km^{2} (47.822 sq mi)

Population (2017)
  - Total: 173,987
  - Density: 1,404.71/km^{2} (3,638.2/sq mi)
- Time zone: UTC+7 (ICT)
- Postal code: 10520
- Geocode: 1011

Lat Krabang (Thai: ลาดกระบัง, pronounced [lâːt krā.bāŋ]) is one of the eastern districts of Bangkok.

== Geography & history ==
Lat Krabang (lit. 'slope of shield') is the second largest district of Bangkok (the largest being its neighbour, Nong Chok). The meaning of the name is uncertain. One hypothesis suggests that it refers to a "field of krabang". The word krabang can also mean a type of fishing device once used by local people.

Neighbouring districts are (from the south clockwise): Bang Bo, Bang Sao Thong and Bang Phli (Samut Prakan province); Prawet, Saphan Sung, Min Buri and Nong Chok (Bangkok) and Mueang Chachoengsao (Chachoengsao province).

About two-thirds of the district is farmland. Other areas include industrial parks and residential neighbourhoods. As a result, the landscape is dotted with ditches and canals. One of the main waterways is Khlong Prawet Burirom. The district is known for its strong local identity and a way of life shaped by canal culture, especially in areas that remain inaccessible by road. In some places, people still use boats and walkways along the canal banks.

Today, Lat Krabang continues to be one of the few districts in Bangkok where rice farming is still practiced, alongside nearby areas such as Min Buri and Nong Chok. In the past, rice was commonly traded by boat. Farmers would use large baskets to manually load and unload the rice at mills. With limited tools and labour, they could only grow rice once a year. Harvest typically began in late November or December, and without machinery, the process was labour-intensive. After harvesting, farmers had to carry the rice home, which could take six, seven, or even ten days of hard work, often with help from their buffaloes. The rice fields in Lat Krabang are known for their wide range of rice varieties.

Before 1992, the rowboat was a key mode of local transportation. It was commonly used not only for daily travel but also for important ceremonies. When someone died, rowboats were used to transport the coffin to the temple. They also played a significant role in religious events such as monk ordinations.

In October 2005, the plan to create the special administrative area Nakhon Suvarnabhumi around Suvarnabhumi Airport became public. Lat Krabang was among the five districts that were to be included in this new administrative area.

== Administration ==
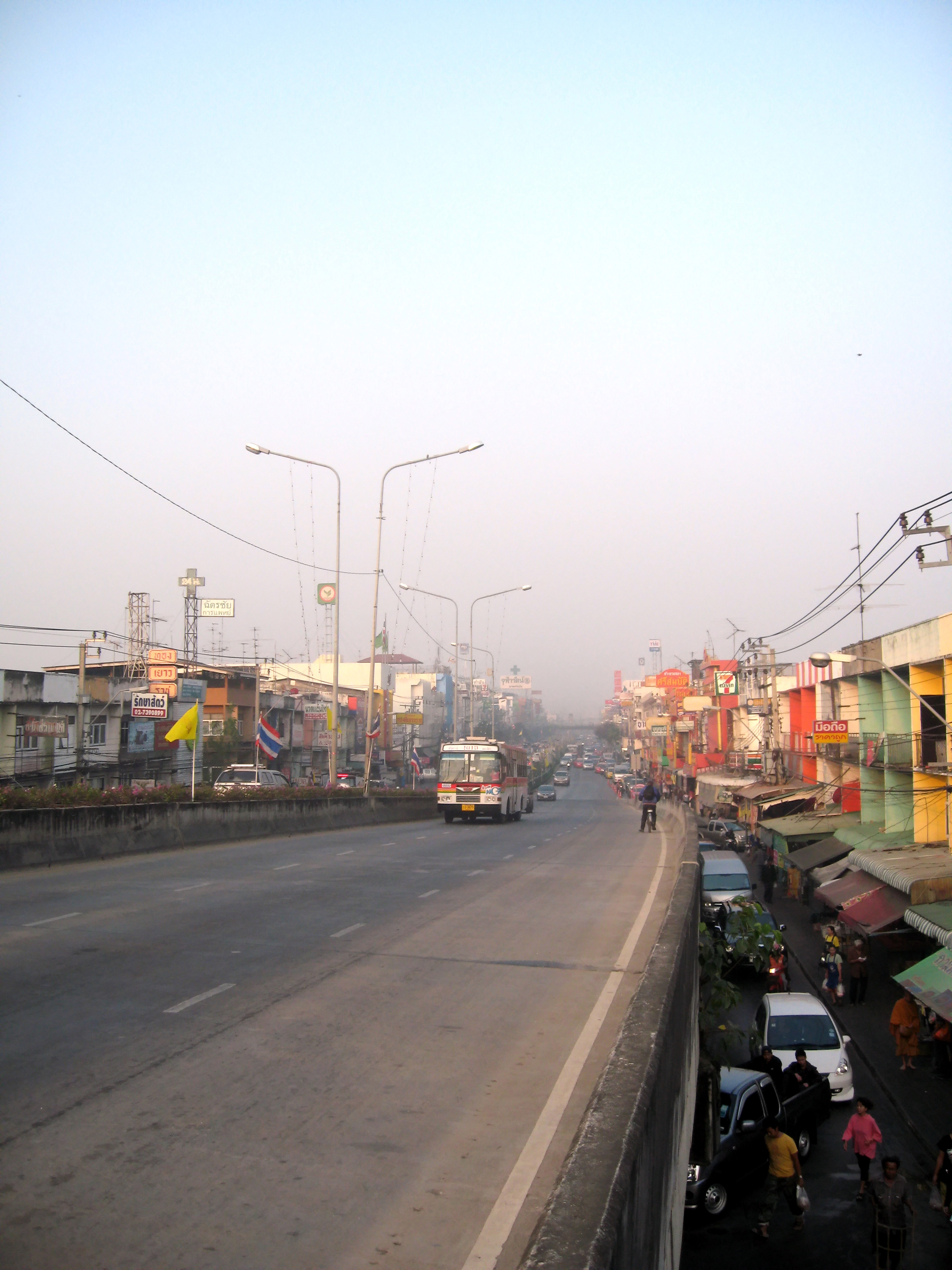
A bridge crossing Hua Takhe

The district is divided into six sub-districts (khwaeng).

No.	Name	Thai	Area (km^{2})	Map
1.	Lat Krabang	ลาดกระบัง	10.823	Map
2.	Khlong Song Ton Nun	คลองสองต้นนุ่น	14.297	Map
3.	Khlong Sam Prawet	คลองสามประเวศ	17.458	Map
4.	Lam Pla Thio	ลำปลาทิว	33.752	Map
5.	Thap Yao	ทับยาว	25.834	Map
6.	Khum Thong	ขุมทอง	21.695	Map
Total			123.859	Map

== Politics ==
Lat Krabang is considered another district in which the Pheu Thai Party (and its predecessors, Thai Rak Thai Party and People's Power Party) has traditionally enjoyed strong and stable support. In the 2023 general election, it was the only constituency in Bangkok where a Pheu Thai candidate defeated the Move Forward Party candidate, doing so by a very narrow margin of just four votes. However, in the 2026 general election, the constituency was won by the People's Party, which continued the political movement of the Move Forward Party following the latter's dissolution earlier.

== Places ==
- King Mongkut's Institute of Technology Lat Krabang (KMITL)
- Phra Nakhon Park
- Protpittayapayat School
- Lat Krabang Industrial Estate
- Hua Takhe
