= Lat Krabang subdistrict =

Coordinates: 13.715953°N 100.752059°E

Lat Krabang ลาดกระบัง
- Khwaeng
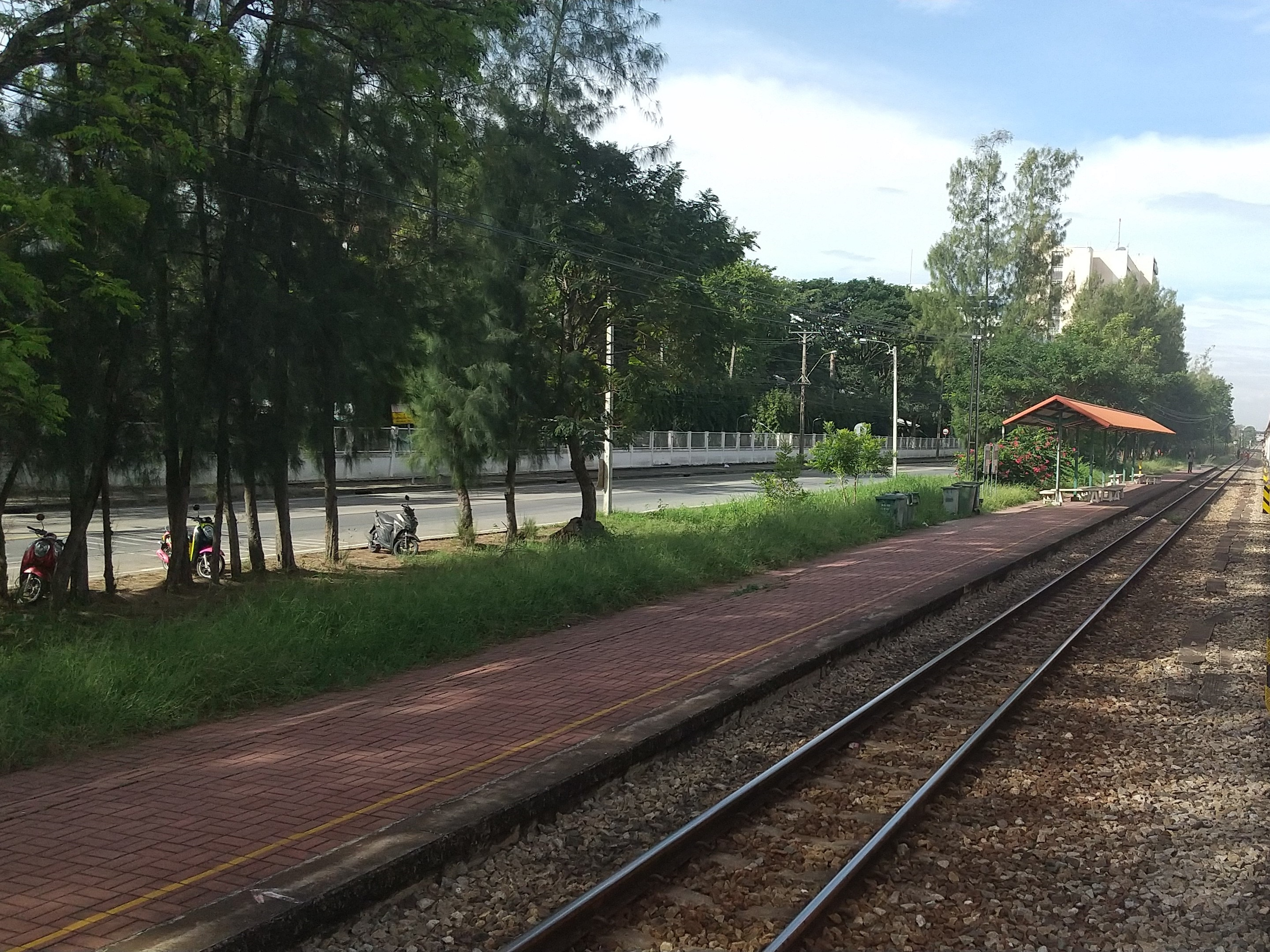
- Phra Chom Klao railway halt, Lat Krabang in late 2022

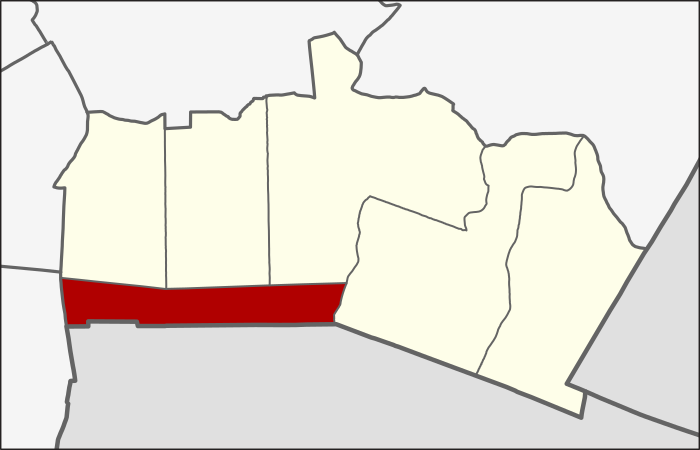
- Location in Lat Krabang District
- Country: Thailand
- Province: Bangkok
- Khet: Lat Krabang

Area
  - Total: 10.823 km^{2} (4.179 sq mi)

Population (2019)
  - Total: 30,353
- Time zone: UTC+7 (ICT)
- Postal code: 10520
- TIS 1099: 101101

Lat Krabang (Thai: ลาดกระบัง, pronounced [lâːt krā.bāŋ]) is a khwaeng (subdistrict) of Lat Krabang District, in Bangkok, Thailand. In 2019, it had a total population of 30,353 people.
