= Wari Phirom Park =

Park in Bangkok, Thailand

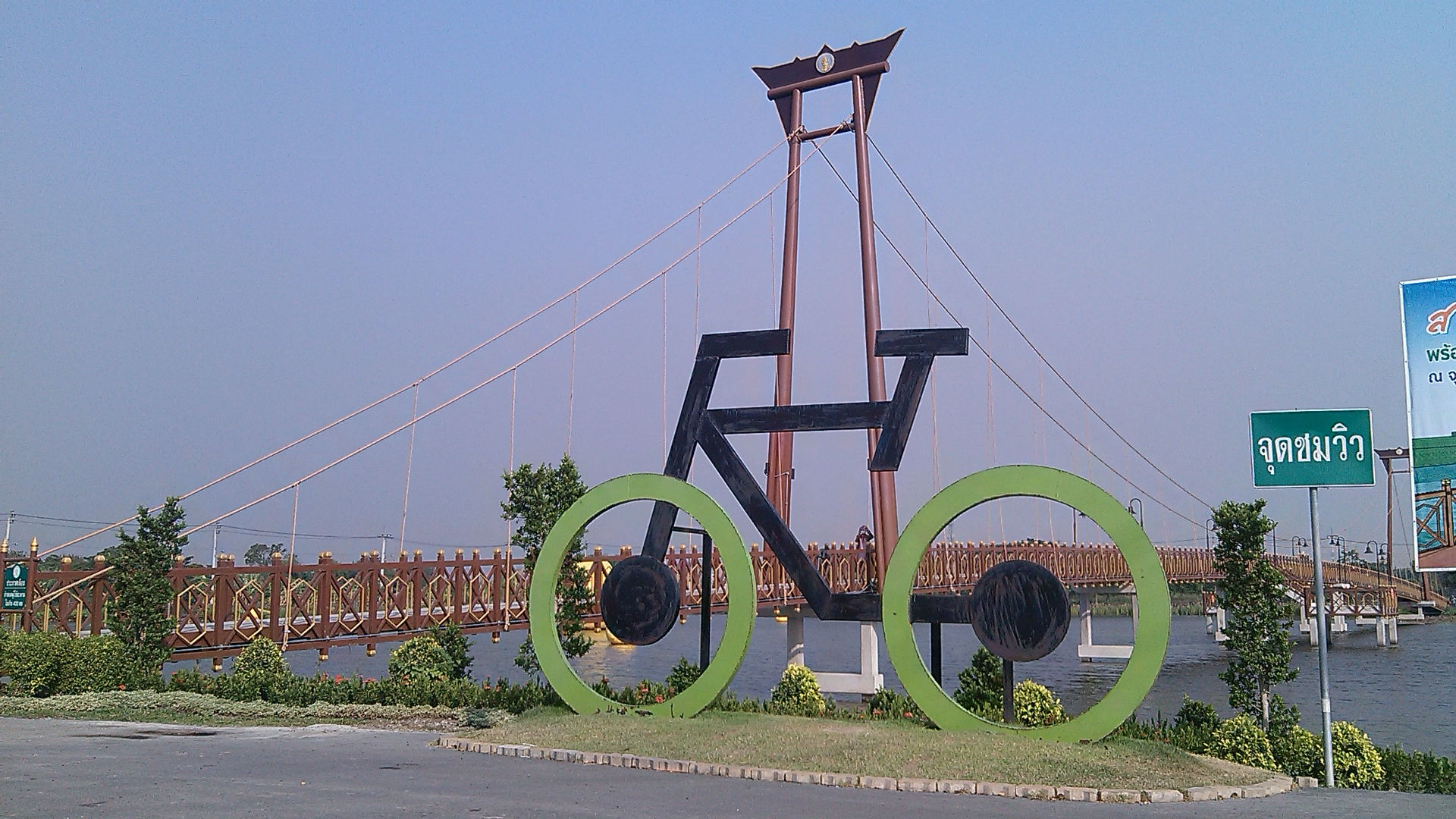
- Wrought iron bike shaped sculpture
- Interactive map of Wari Phirom Park
- Type: Public park
- Location: Soi Pracha Ruamchai 47, Sai Kong Din Tai, Khlong Sam Wa, Bangkok
- Coordinates: 13°50′59.88″N 100°46′27.72″E
- Area: 47 acres (19 ha)
- Created: 2014
- Operator: Bangkok Metropolitan Administration (BMA)
- Status: Open daily from 05:00 am to 08:00 pm
- Public transit: BMTA bus line 1-58

Wari Phirom Park or alternatively spelled Waree Phirom Park (Thai: สวนวารีภิรมย์) is a public park in Khlong Sam Wa district on the northeast outskirts of Bangkok.

The park originally known as Beung Makham Tet (บึงมะขามเทศ) and Beung Sakae Ngam Sam Duen (บึงสะแกงามสามเดือน). They were all reservoirs that receive water from canals Khlong Saen Saep and Khlong Hok Wa to prevent flooding in Bangkok. It first opened as a public park in August 2014.

Later, Bangkok Metropolitan Administration (BMA) took steps to improve the landscape of the park by planting perennials, ornamental plants, and aquatic plants to increase shady conditions, and created a bike and walking-jogging tracks, 4.2 km (2.6 mi) in length, around the two reservoirs to honour Queen Sirikit on the occasion of her 82nd birthday on August 12, 2014.

Its name literally means pleasantly water park. The bike track takes around 30 minutes to complete. It has a large wrought iron bike shaped at the foot of the suspension bridge as a landmark.

There is still a rural atmosphere around the park. Surrounded by rice fields and herds of cows or buffaloes of local farmers.

Park components include a bike track, walking-jogging track, public restroom and public service buildings, aerobic ground, bike track for toddlers.
