= Kempinski Shekinah Palace Douala =

Hotel and business complex under construction in Douala, Cameroon

General information
- Status: Under construction
- Type: Hotel, serviced apartments, offices, conference centre
- Location: Bonanjo, Douala, Cameroon
- Groundbreaking: 25 September 2026
- Estimated completion: 2029
- Cost: 220 billion FCFA (about €339 million)
- Owner: All Luxury Suites Group (ALS Group)

Design and construction
- Main contractor: China Machinery Engineering Corporation

Other information
- Number of rooms: 214
- Parking: 600 spaces

The Kempinski Shekinah Palace Douala (also Kempinski Shekinah Palace Douala Bonanjo) is a hotel and business complex under construction in the Bonanjo district of Douala, Cameroon. Developed by All Luxury Suites Group (ALS Group), a company headed by Cameroonian businessman Rodolphe Simo Kam, it is to be operated by Kempinski and is valued at about 220 billion CFA francs (around €339 million).

The foundation stone was laid on 25 September 2026 by Prime Minister Joseph Dion Ngute, and the opening is planned for 2029. The scale of the investment has been questioned in the Cameroonian press in view of the country's limited tourist numbers and transport infrastructure.

== Project ==
The complex occupies a site of about two hectares in Bonanjo, the administrative district of Douala near the port. The programme comprises 214 rooms and suites, 35 serviced apartments, about 17,000 square metres (180,000 sq ft) of offices, a 2,000-seat multipurpose hall, about 2,000 square metres (22,000 sq ft) of retail space, a 500 square metres (5,400 sq ft) art gallery, five restaurants, five bars, two swimming pools, a fitness centre and about 600 parking spaces.

The project is promoted by Rodolphe Simo Kam, chairman and CEO of ALS Group and managing director of the Société financière de tourisme et de loisirs (Sofitoul), who presents it as part of a vision of Cameroon as a "tourist goldmine".

== History ==
Feasibility studies began in June 2019. Kempinski was selected as operator in August 2020, and the building permit was issued in December 2022. After a tender launched in April 2024, the construction contract was awarded to China Machinery Engineering Corporation (CMEC) in November 2025.

The foundation stone was laid on 25 September 2026 at a ceremony presided over by Prime Minister Joseph Dion Ngute as personal representative of the head of state. Works are scheduled to last 36 months, including five months of fit-out, with completion expected around September 2029.

== Financing ==
Of the total value of about 220 billion FCFA, which includes tax and customs incentives, 207.62 billion is to be financed by investors: 92.30 billion in senior debt (44.5%) repayable over 13 years, 60.29 billion from investors, 43.03 billion in equity and land from the developer, and 12 billion expected from apartment sales. The Development Bank of Central African States (BDEAC) approved a loan of 30 billion FCFA in December 2024; Afreximbank and BGFIBank are also involved, BGFIBank Cameroun acting as arranger. The developer projects about 3,000 jobs during construction and 4,000 direct and indirect jobs once in operation.

== Reception ==
A column in Camer.be questioned the relevance of a luxury hotel of this size in a country receiving about 912,000 international tourists a year, with poor road, rail and air links, and contrasted the investment with needs in health and education. Investir au Cameroun noted that the related public works on roads and drainage, attributed to the state, were not costed, and that the bank financing was not confirmed as fully secured.
