= GINAF =

Dutch truck manufacturer

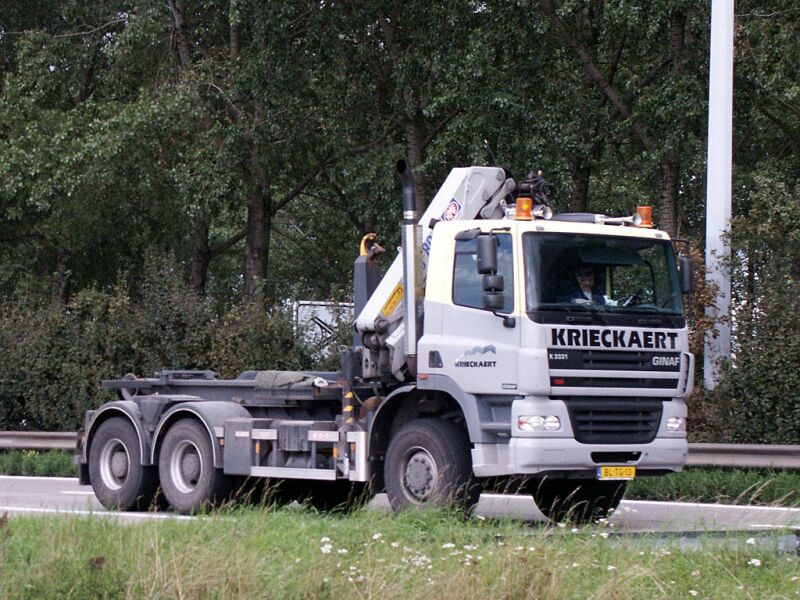
GINAF X3331 truck with a crane

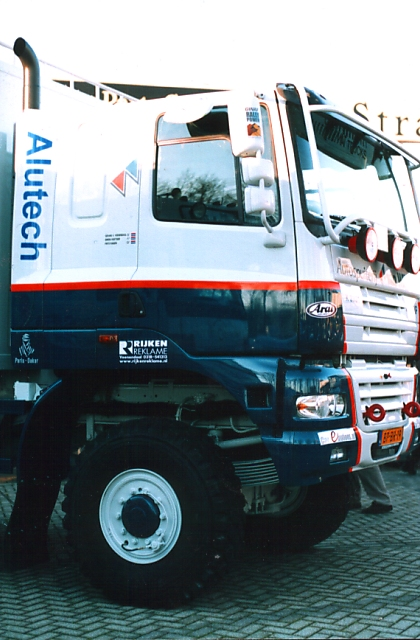
GINAF X3331 Dakar rally service truck

GINAF (legally GINAF Trucks Nederland BV) is a Dutch truck manufacturer which produces trucks mainly for heavy duty off-road transport, construction and agricultural work. About 250 trucks are made each year in the company's factory in Veenendaal in the Netherlands. The company also has a service center for their trucks in the small Dutch town Ederveen.

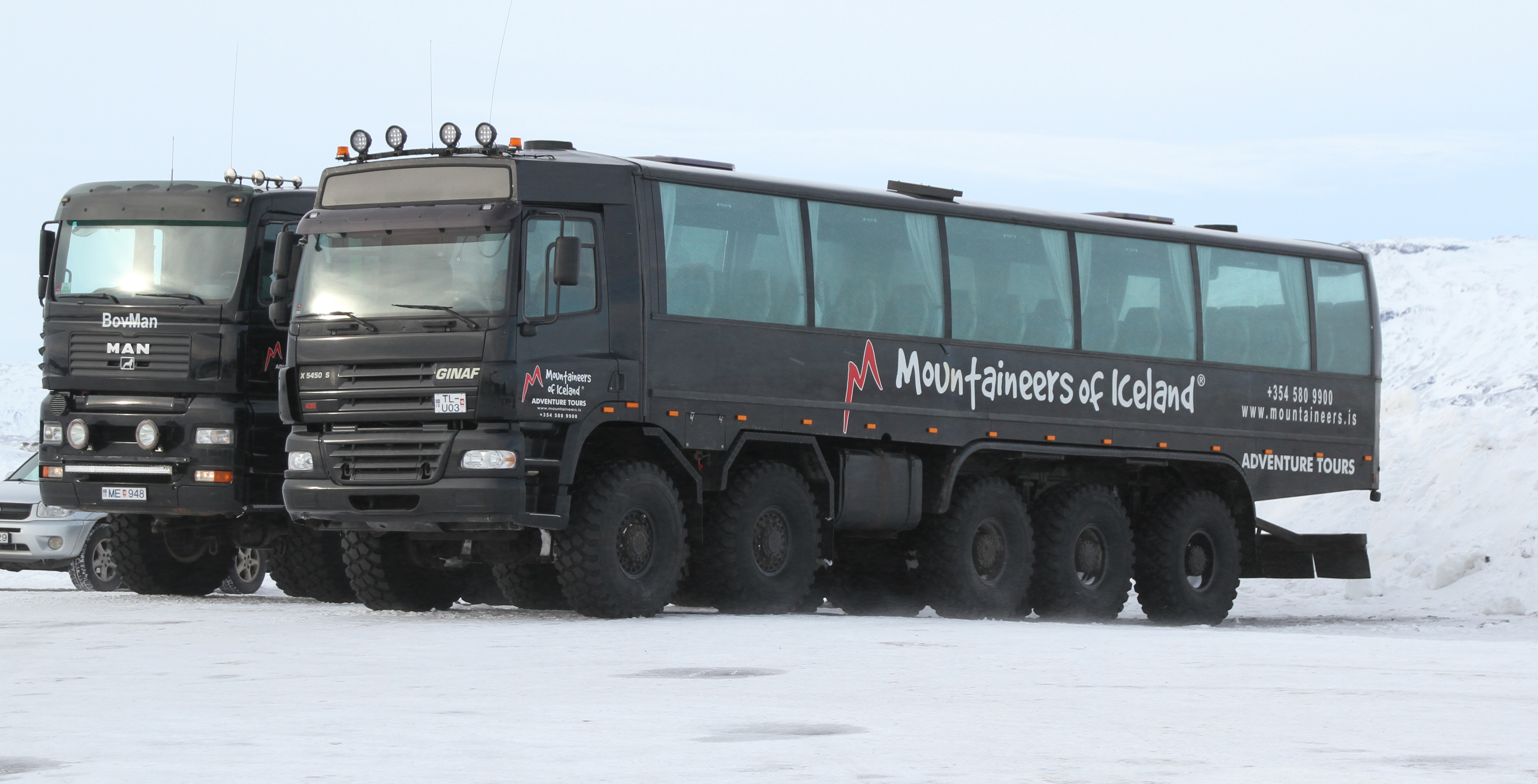
GINAF 10 Wheel Drive

== History ==
The company was founded in 1948 by Wuf and Adrie van Ginkel and started out as a truck dealer. Modifications to trucks left over from the US Army such as the GMC Diamond were also done and these trucks were then sold. In the early 1960s the company became a true truck manufacturer and changed name to Van Ginkels Automobiel Fabriek, or GINAF for short. The company started producing their own trucks using mainly DAF components. Because of this GINAF trucks often look similar to DAF trucks as the cabin used is usually the same as the ones used by DAF.

Since 1986 GINAF uses a hydropneumatic suspension system for many of its trucks, which functions better under heavy loads and rough terrain compared to conventional suspension systems and also has a longer lifespan.

GINAF was declared bankrupt in December 2011; it was then taken over by Chinese CHTC. In October 2020, CHTC divested itself from the company through a management buy-out. However, the truck and bus retrofitter Clean Logistics has taken over GINAF's activities.

== Special trucks ==
Special custom made trucks include firetrucks, riot control trucks, military trucks, garbage trucks and airport fuel bowsers. Several GINAF trucks also participate in the annual Dakar Rally as both rally and service trucks, having done so since 1987, though the first GINAF to participate in the rally was labelled as being a DAF for marketing purposes. The number of GINAF trucks participating in the rally has been on the rise since Dutch driver Hans Bekx entered a newly constructed GINAF truck in 2000.
