= Bonluck =

Chinese bus manufacturer

CHTC Bonluck Bus Co., Ltd
- Trade name: Bonluck Bus
- Type: Subsidiary
- Headquarters: Nanchang, Jiangxi, China
- Products: buses
- Parent: Hengtian Group

Chinese name
- Simplified Chinese: 中国恒天·江西凯马百路佳客车有限公司
- Traditional Chinese: 中國恆天·江西凱馬百路佳客車有限公司
Transcriptions
Standard Mandarin
- Hanyu Pinyin: Zhōngguó Héngtiān Jiāngxī Kǎimǎ Bǎilùjiā Kèchē Yǒuxiàn Gōngsī

Bonluck Bus
- Simplified Chinese: 百路佳客车
Transcriptions
Standard Mandarin
- Hanyu Pinyin: Bǎilùjiā Kèchē
- Website: Bonluckbus.com

CHTC Bonluck Bus Co., Ltd., trading as Bonluck Bus, is a bus manufacturer based in Nanchang, Jiangxi, China. It is a government-owned enterprise, and since 2010 has been part of the CHTC conglomerate. Bonluck can build up to 5,000 buses and coaches a year. Bonluck had total area of 150,000 m2 and built-up area of 70,000m2. The buses have been sold around the world including Australia, Europe and the Americas.

== Models ==
- Bonluck JXK6840 bus
- Bonluck JXK6145XR Coach
- Bonluck JXK6128CR Coach
- Bonluck JXK6960CR Coach
- Bonluck JXK6850CR Coach
- Bonluck JXK6790CR Coach
- Bonluck JXK6137 Coach
- Bonluck JXK6850DR Coach
- Bonluck JXK6105DR Coach
- Bonluck JXK6127DR Coach
- Bonluck JXK6126XR Coach
- Bonluck JXK6960G City bus
- Bonluck JXK6116 City bus
- Bonluck JXK6120 City bus
- Bonluck JXK6601 Electric bus
- Bonluck Luxury Motorhome
- Bonluck JXK6105 Motorhome

=== Thailand ===
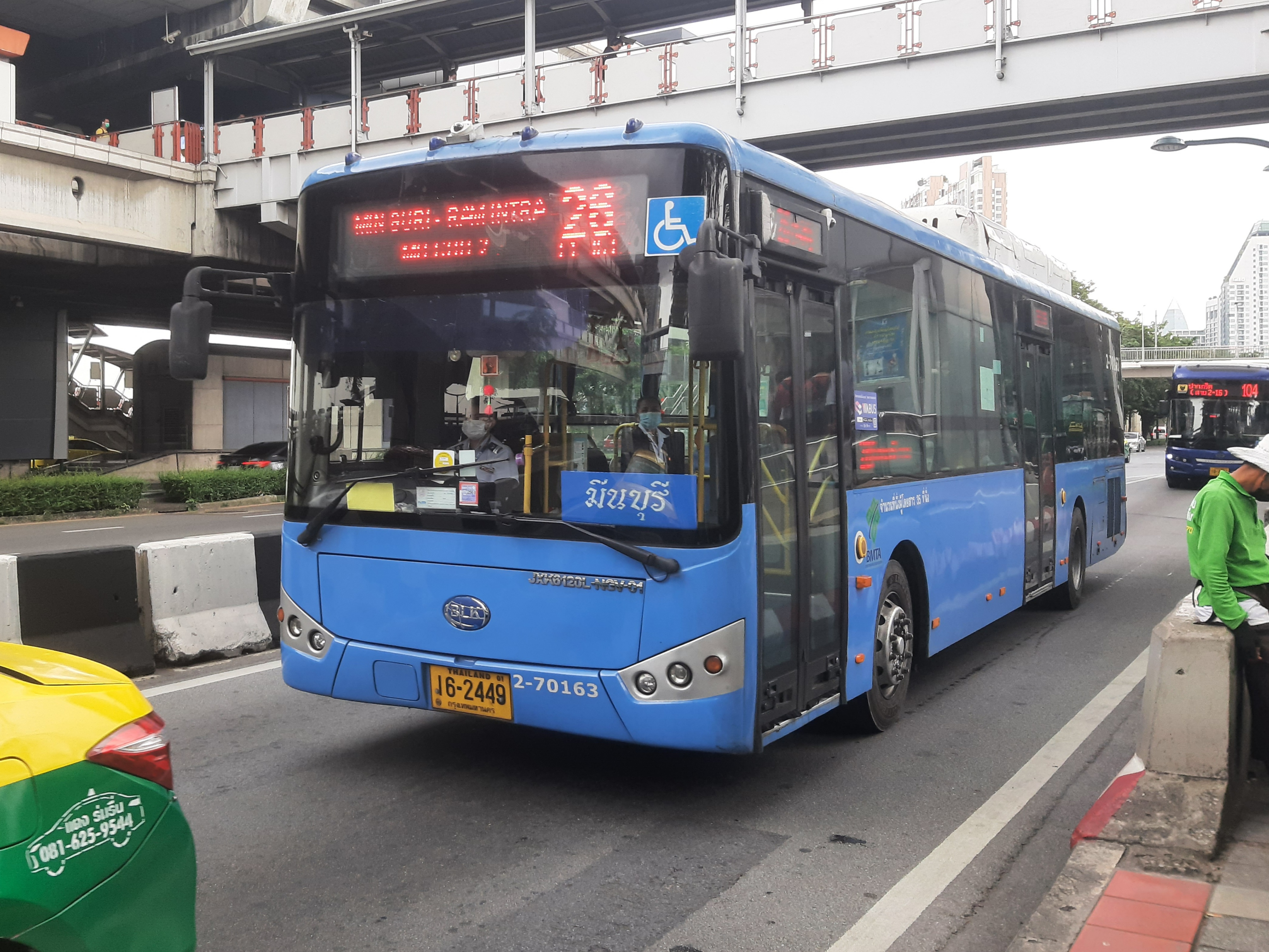
Bonluck JXK6120L-NGV-01
- Bonluck JXK6120L-NGV-01

== Gallery ==
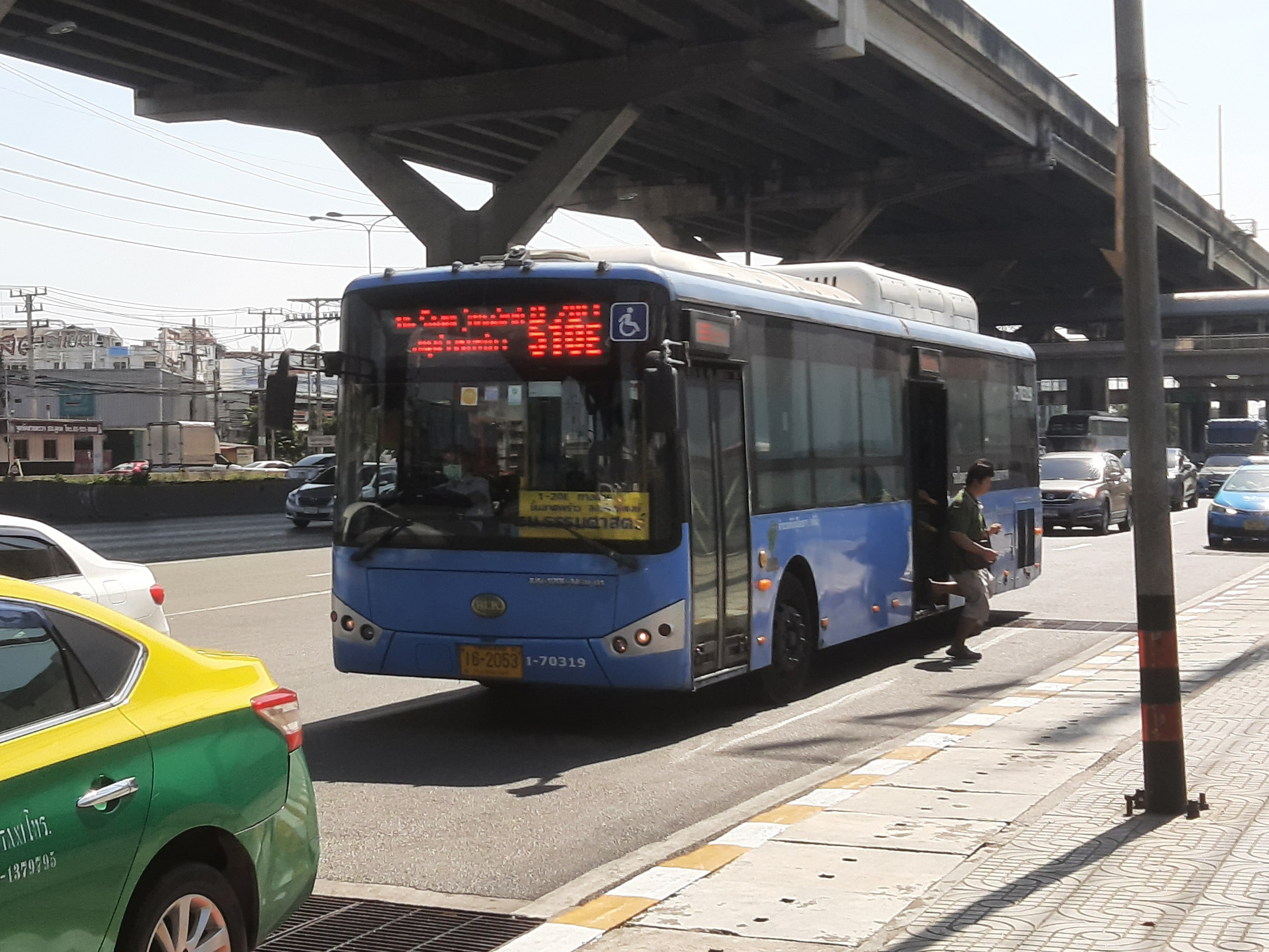
Bonluck JXK6120L-NGV-01 (BMTA)

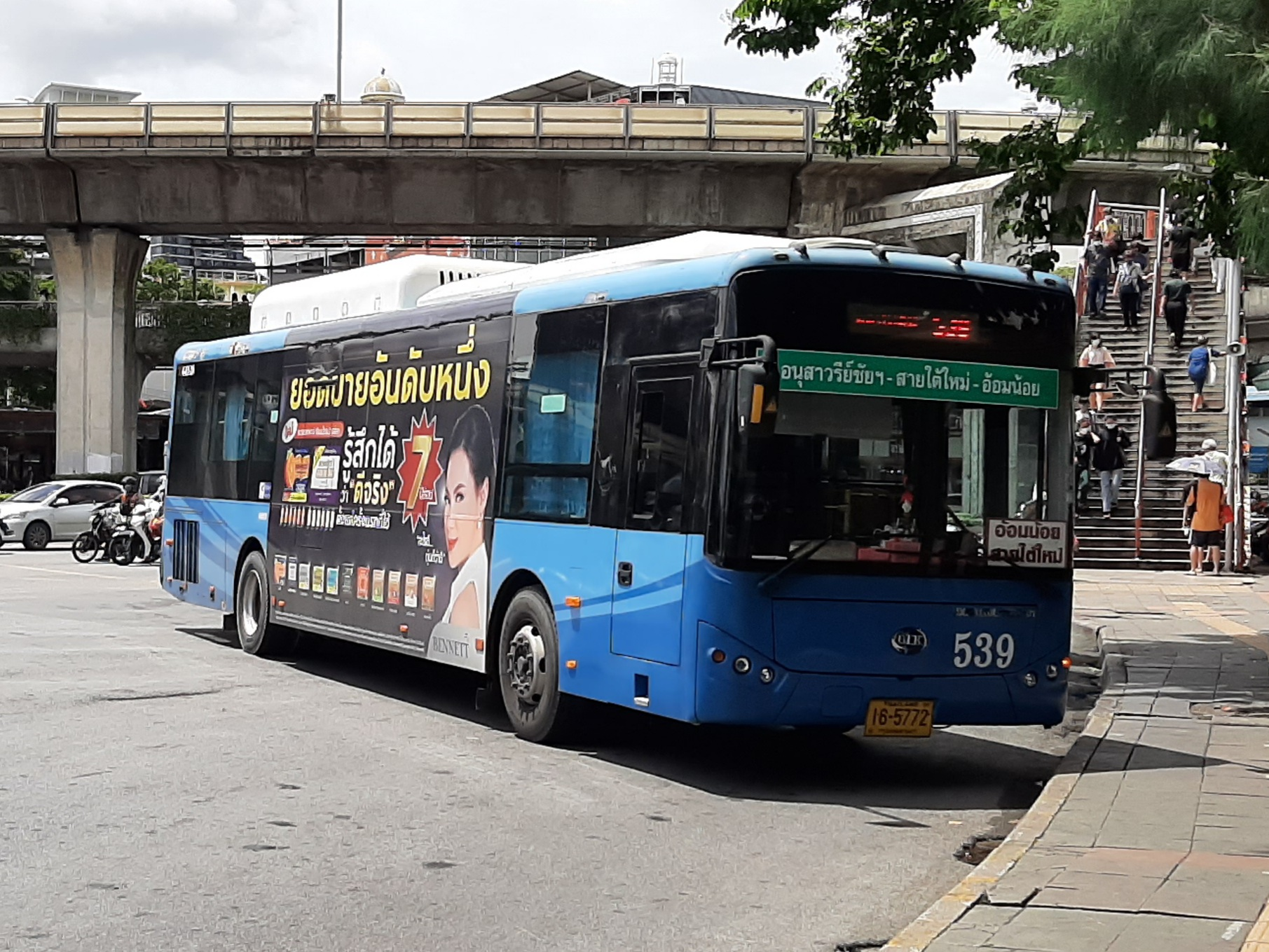
Bonluck JXK6120L-NGV-01 (Boonmongkolkarn CO., LTD.)
