= CHTC Fong's Industries =

CHTC Fong's Industries Co., Ltd.
- Formerly: Fong's Industries Co., Ltd.
- Type: public
- Traded as: SEHK: 641
- Industry: Textile machinery
- Founded: 1963; 1990 (re-incorporated)
- Founder: Fong Sou Lam
- Headquarters: Hong Kong (general office); Bermuda (registered office)
- Area served: China, exported worldwide
- Key people: Ye Maoxin (Chairman); Ji Xin (CEO)
- Owner: Chinese Government via CHTC (55.80%); Fong Sou Lam and spouse (16.77%)
- Parent: China Hi-Tech Group Corporation
- Website: http://www.fongs.com

CHTC Fong's Industries Co., Ltd.
- Traditional Chinese: 恒天立信工業有限公司
Transcriptions

CHTC Fong's Industries Co., Ltd. is a company founded by Fong Sou Lam in 1963. Fong's Industries has principally focused on the business of designing, developing, manufacturing and selling of textile dyeing and finishing machinery. Starting in 1969, the business has been carried on under the name of Fong's National Engineering Co., Ltd. and becomes one of the first Hong Kong companies to explore the giant textile dyeing finishing market in China—a key turning point for the Group's future development.

In 1990, Fong's Industries Co., Ltd. was the first company of its kind publicly listed on the Hong Kong Stock Exchange. To accommodate the need of major raw materials for its manufacturing business, the Group also set up the stainless steel trading and stainless steel castings manufacturing businesses. Today the group has a workforce of approximately 4,700 employees serving over 5,700 customers worldwide.

== Portfolio ==
Fong's Industries Group was founded in 1963 and was the first Chinese textile machinery manufacturer to acquire European companies such as Switzerland-based Xorella and German companies Then Maschinen-und Apparatebau GmbH and GTM Goller Textilemaschinen GmbH. It has also found Fong's Water Technology Co. Ltd. to provide water treatment and reuse systems with comprehensive services. The group consists of the following brands:

- FONG'S NATIONAL
- THEN
- GOLLER
- MONFORTS
- XORELLA
- FWT
- FONG'S STEEL
- TYCON ALLOY
