= Hanma Technology =

Publicly traded Chinese vehicle manufacturing company

Hanma Technology Group Co., Ltd.
- Trade name: CAMC
- Formerly: Anhui Xingma Automobile Co., Ltd., Hualing Xingma Automobile (Group) Co., Ltd.
- Type: Public
- Traded as: SSE: 600375
- Industry: Automotive
- Founded: 12 December 1999
- Headquarters: Ma'anshan, China
- Area served: Worldwide
- Key people: Liu Hanru (Chairman)
- Products: Trucks, engines
- Production output: ▲5,313 vehicles (2018)
- Revenue: ▲CN¥5.9 billion (2017)
- Net income: CN¥55.9 million (2017)
- Total assets: ▲CN¥11 billion (2017)
- Total equity: ▲CN¥3 billion (2017)

Chinese name
- Simplified Chinese: 华菱星马汽车（集团）股份有限公司
- Traditional Chinese: 華菱星馬汽車（集團）股份有限公司
Transcriptions
Standard Mandarin
- Hanyu Pinyin: Huálíng Xīngmǎ Qìchē (Jítuán) Gǔfèn Yǒuxiàn Gōngsī

Hualing Xingma
- Simplified Chinese: 华菱星马
- Traditional Chinese: 華菱星馬
Transcriptions
Standard Mandarin
- Hanyu Pinyin: Huálíng Xīngmǎ
- Wade–Giles: Hua^{2}-ling^{2} Hsing^{1}-ma^{3}
- IPA: [xwǎlǐŋ ɕíŋmà]
Wu
- Romanization: Gho^{平}lin^{平} Sin^{平}ma^{上}
Yue: Cantonese
- Yale Romanization: Wàhlìhng Sīngmáh
- Jyutping: waa4 ling4 sing1 maa5
- IPA: [wa˩lɪŋ˩ sɪŋ˥ma˩˧]
- Website: www.camc.cc

Hanma Technology Group Co., Ltd., formerly known as Hualing Xingma Automobile (Group) Co., Ltd. is a publicly traded Chinese manufacturer of trucks and truck-based special vehicles established in 1999. The company traces its origins back to a Ma'anshan manufacturer established in 1970. As a marque and as the company name in markets outside China, Hualing Xingma uses the designation CAMC. The current controlling shareholder of the company is Geely, who owns 28.01% through Geely New Energy Commercial Vehicle Group.

== History ==
=== Early years and expansion ===
A predecessor of Hualing Xingma built its plant in 1970 and initially produced building materials machinery. From the 1980s onwards, it mainly produced cement trucks and mixer trucks. In 1999, the company was incorporated as Anhui Xingma Automobile Co., Ltd. and was listed on the Shanghai Stock Exchange in April 2003. In the same year of its listing, it signed a long-term technical cooperation agreement with Mitsubishi Fuso of Japan, entering into the heavy truck production. In 2004, the first heavy-duty vehicle chassis was off the assembly line. In 2005, the company started exporting its heavy trucks to overseas markets. In 2008, the second-generation heavy trucks from the company were launched. In March 2011, Anhui Hualing Automobile Co., Ltd. became a company's subsidiary through an asset restructuring. In 2012, after a reincorporation, the company adopted its present name. That same year, it started to produce and sell diesel engines.

=== Financial difficulties and failed acquisition by CHTC ===
The company was affected by the 2008 financial crisis. It had a net loss in 2014 and 2015, as demand for its products was low. It made a profit in 2016 through investments from the shareholders, to avoid a market rule that delisted companies having loses for three years in a row. In late 2015, the company was part of a failed asset reorganisation through Anliang Xiushan Construction Corporation. In June 2017, it was announced that the Chinese state-owned conglomerate CHTC would take control of a 15.24% stake in Hualing Xingma from the Xingma Group, becoming the largest shareholder. The ultimate owner of the stake would change from the Ma'anshan Municipal People's Government to the SASAC. As part of the deal, Hualing Xingma would acquire CHTC's Hubei Xinchufeng in exchange of shares. In August 2017, Hualing Xingma announced that various complexities would stop Hubei Xinchufeng acquisition, but the agreement for CHTC taking a stake was still in place. In October 2017, CHTC announced the agreement was cancelled, as there were not enough safeguards for the investment.

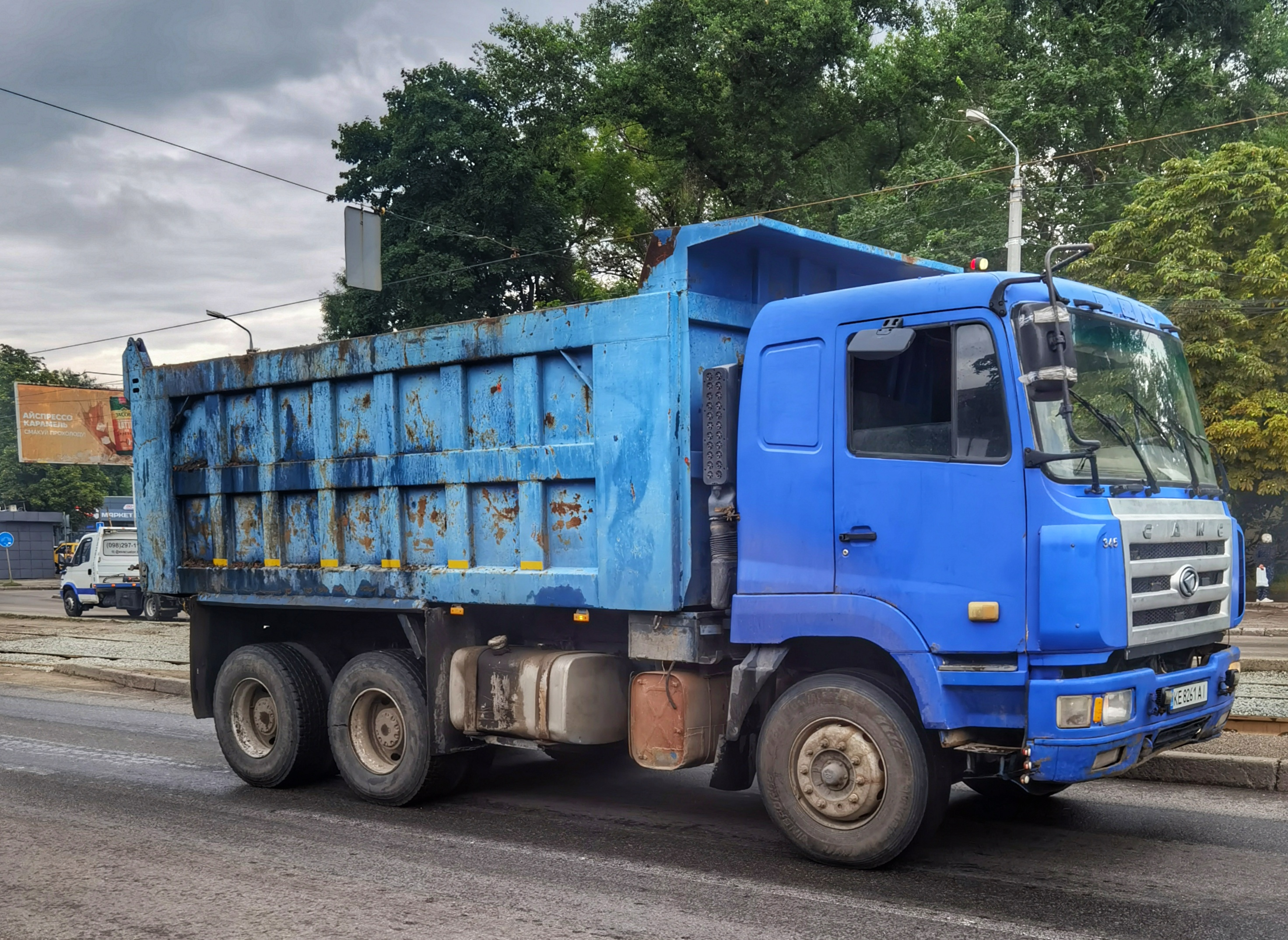
CAMC HN3250 in Dnipro, Ukraine

=== Acquisition by Geely ===
In late July 2020, it was announced that the Xingma Group had agreed to transfer a 15.24% stake of its shares to Geely New Energy Commercial Vehicle Group, a wholly owned subsidiary of Geely Holdings. After the transaction, Geely New Energy would become the de facto controlling shareholder of Hualing Xingma.

== Operations ==
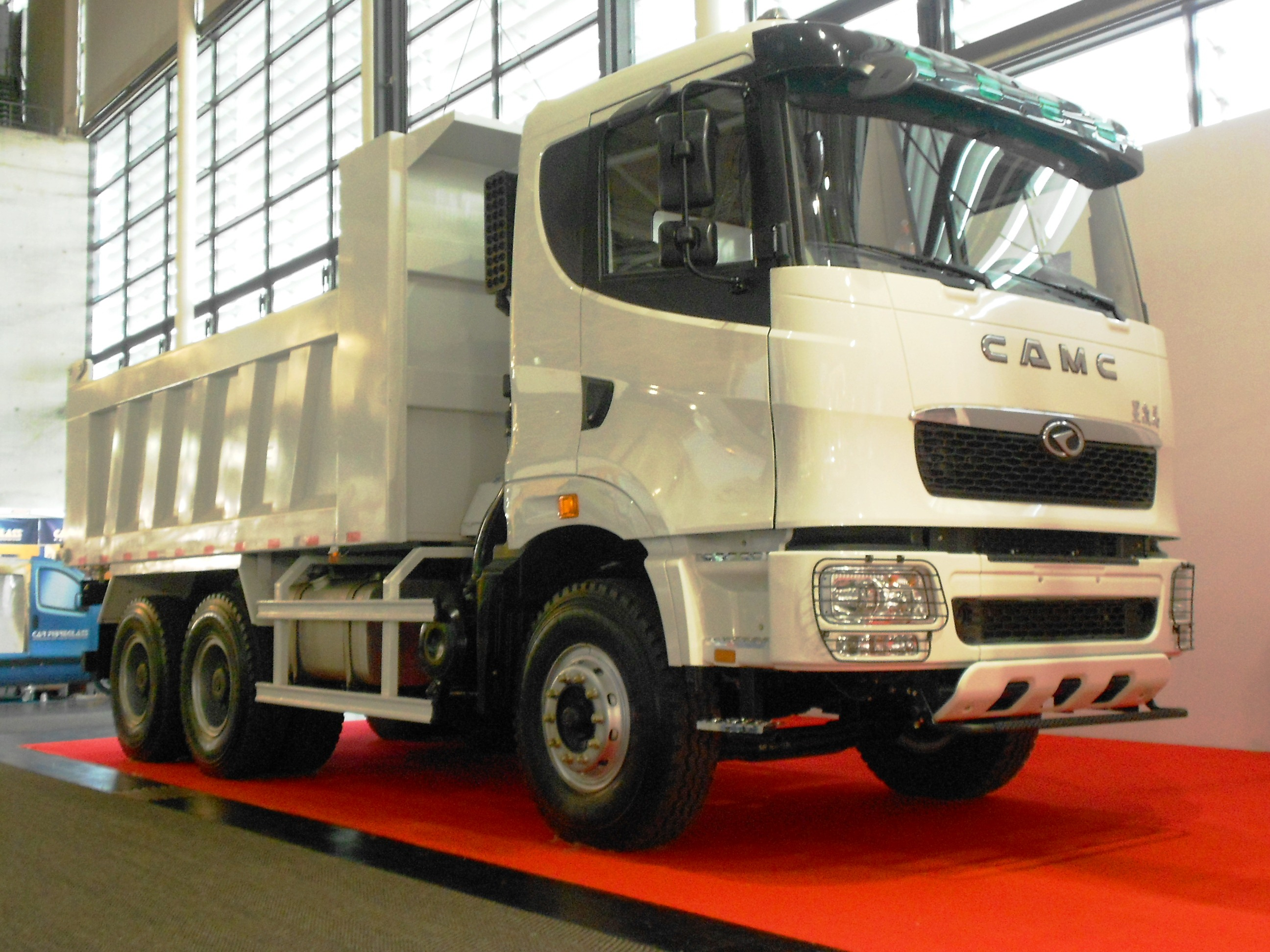
A CAMC truck, pictured in 2012

The company has five production subsidiaries: Anhui Hualing Automobile Co., Ltd., Anhui Xingma Automobile Co., Ltd., Anhui Xingkaima Power Co., Ltd., Anhui Hualing Axle Co., Ltd. and Anhui Forma Automobile Parts (Group) Co., Ltd. The company's main plant has 400,000 m^{2} and the capacity to assemble 100,000 heavy trucks, 50,000 heavy special vehicles and 50,000 engines per year. The company has a research and development operation. CAMC-bagded products are exported to Eastern Europe, North Africa, Southeast Asia and South America, among other markets.

Hualing Xingma maintains technical partnerships with Mitsubishi Fuso and Isuzu of Japan.
