= China National Machinery Industry Corporation =

Chinese conglomerate

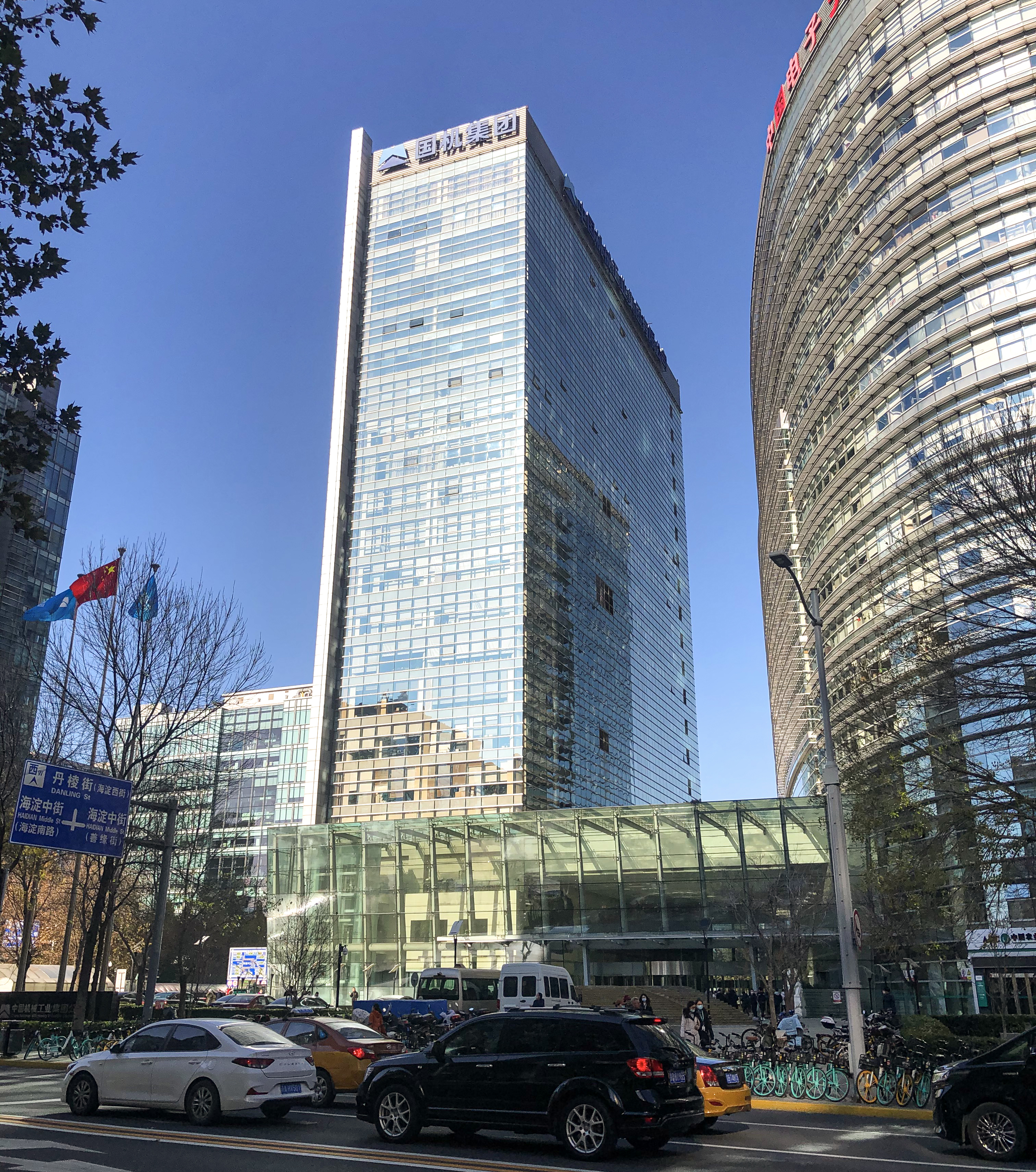
- Sinomach headquarters in Zhongguancun, Beijing
- Native name: 中国机械工业集团（国机集团）
- Company type: State owned enterprise
- Industry: Heavy machinery, construction
- Founded: 1997; 29 years ago
- Headquarters: Beijing, China
- Area served: Worldwide
- Key people: Ren Hongbin (Chairman)
- Products: Tractors, machinery
- Revenue: 300,465,460,000 renminbi (2018)
- Number of employees: 80,000
- Subsidiaries: China Hi-Tech Group Corporation (CHTC); YTO Group; China Machinery Engineering Corporation (CMEC)
- Website: Sinomach Global (in English)

China National Machinery Industry Corporation (also known as Sinomach) is a Chinese conglomerate with businesses in tool making, construction equipment, agricultural equipment, and infrastructure construction. In two particular areas of construction engineering, the company is among the top in terms of revenue from international projects. Based on 2013 rankings compiled by the Engineering News-Record, the company is the third largest contractor of power projects and 8th largest contractor of industrial projects.

A major subsidiary is the YTO Group, primarily a manufacturer of agriculture equipment. In March 2011, YTO Group acquired McCormick France SAS, a French manufacturer of tractors, as part of strategy for entering the European tractor market.

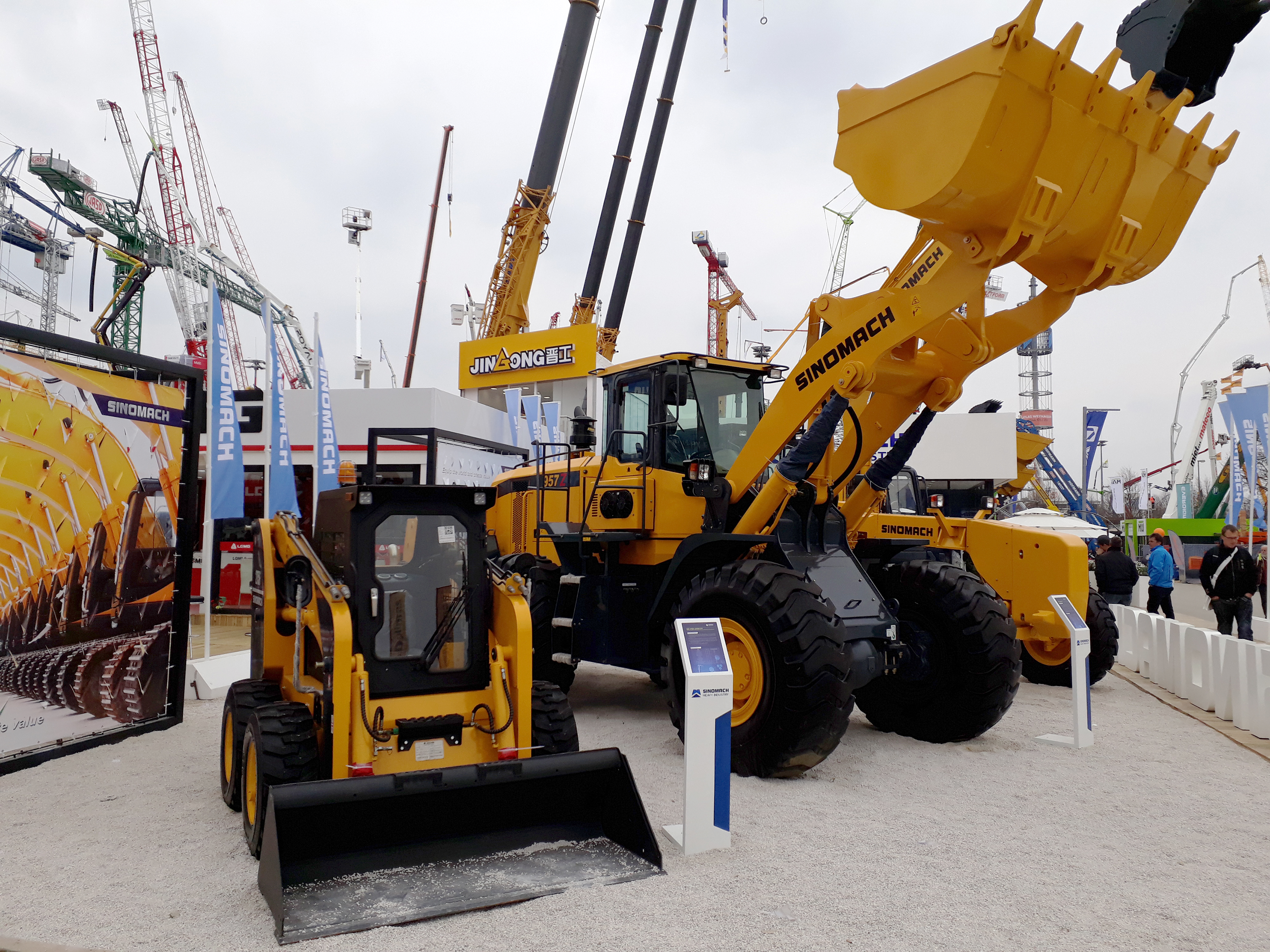
Sinomach wheel loaders exhibited at BAUMA 2019

Another major subsidiary of the company is the China Machinery Engineering Corporation (CMEC), a provider of engineering and construction services. The company expressed interest in building a 10,000 to 30,000 acre complex of industry, retail, and residential properties in the Boise area. The plan is billed as a collaboration "on the reinvigoration of the American industrial base."

In June 2017, a sister SASAC-controlled conglomerate, China Hi-Tech Group Corporation (CHTC), became a wholly owned subsidiary of Sinomach through a restructuring, as part of a plan to reduce the number of SASAC directly controlled companies.

== Automotive subsidiaries ==
=== Kama Automobile ===
The SINOMACH owned Kama Automobile was founded in 1993. It is a state-owned enterprise producing light commercial vehicles under the Kama brand.

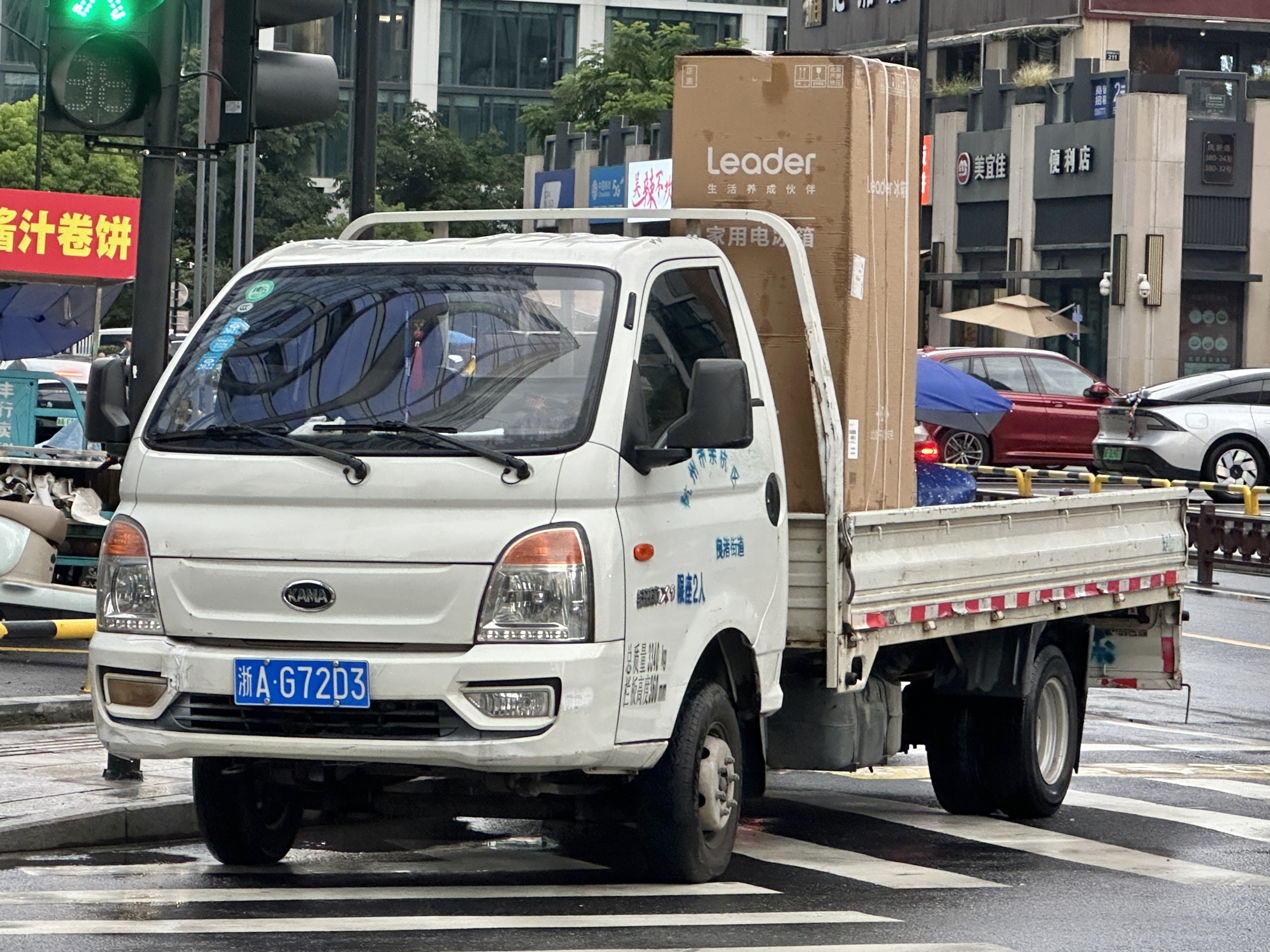
Kama 1750 X (Ruihang X3)

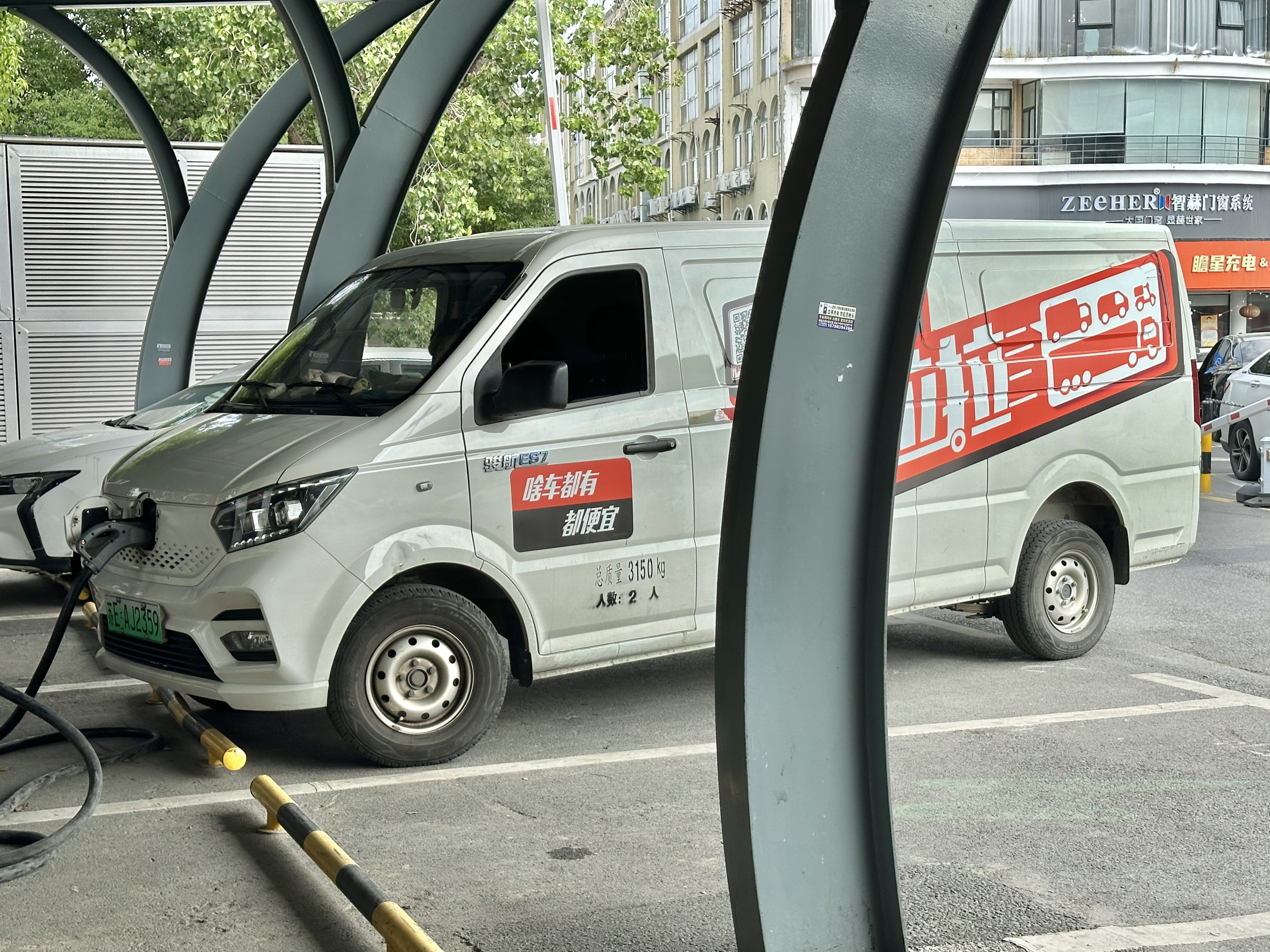
Kama 1715 ES (Ruijie)

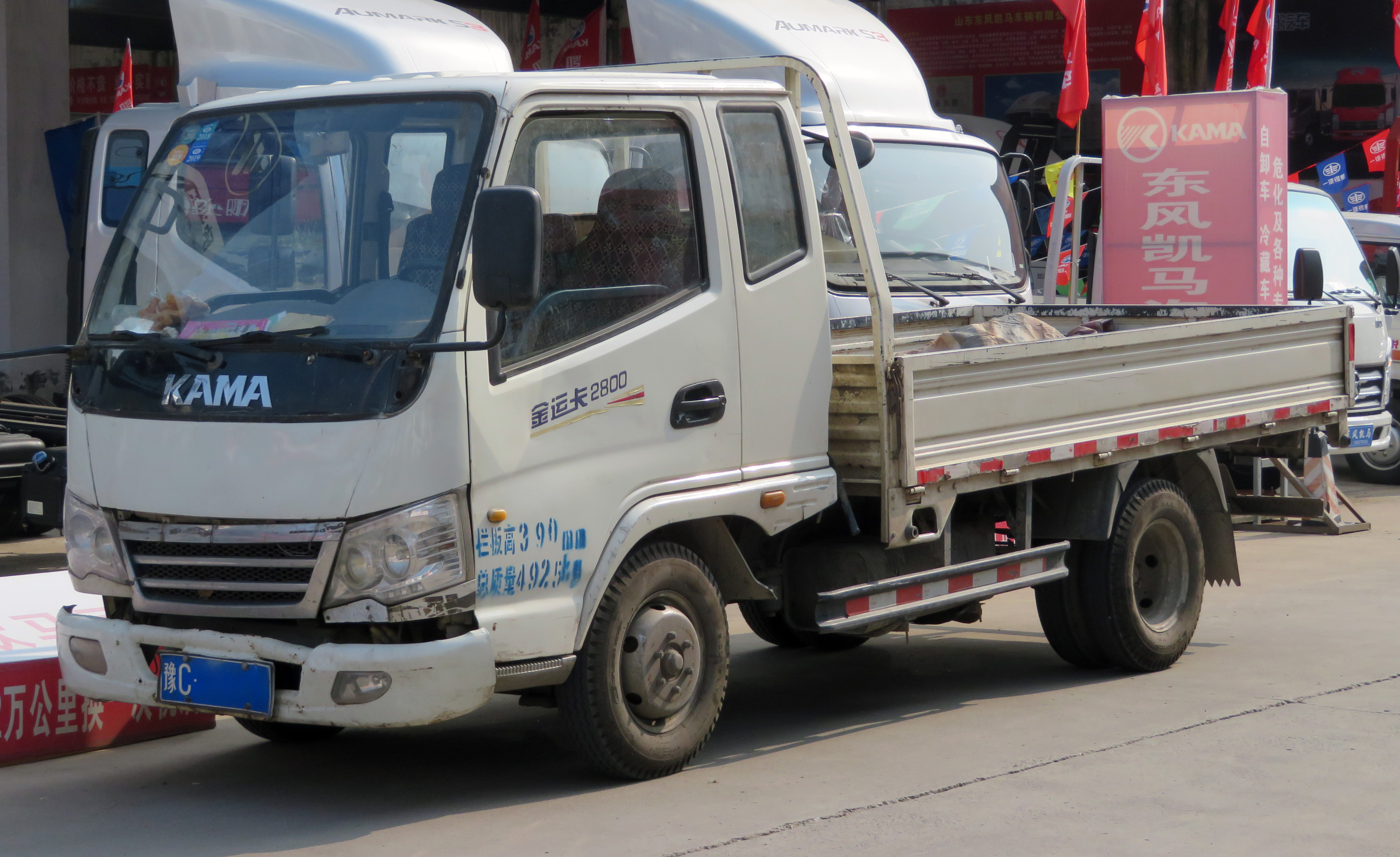
Dongfeng-Kama Jinyunka 2800

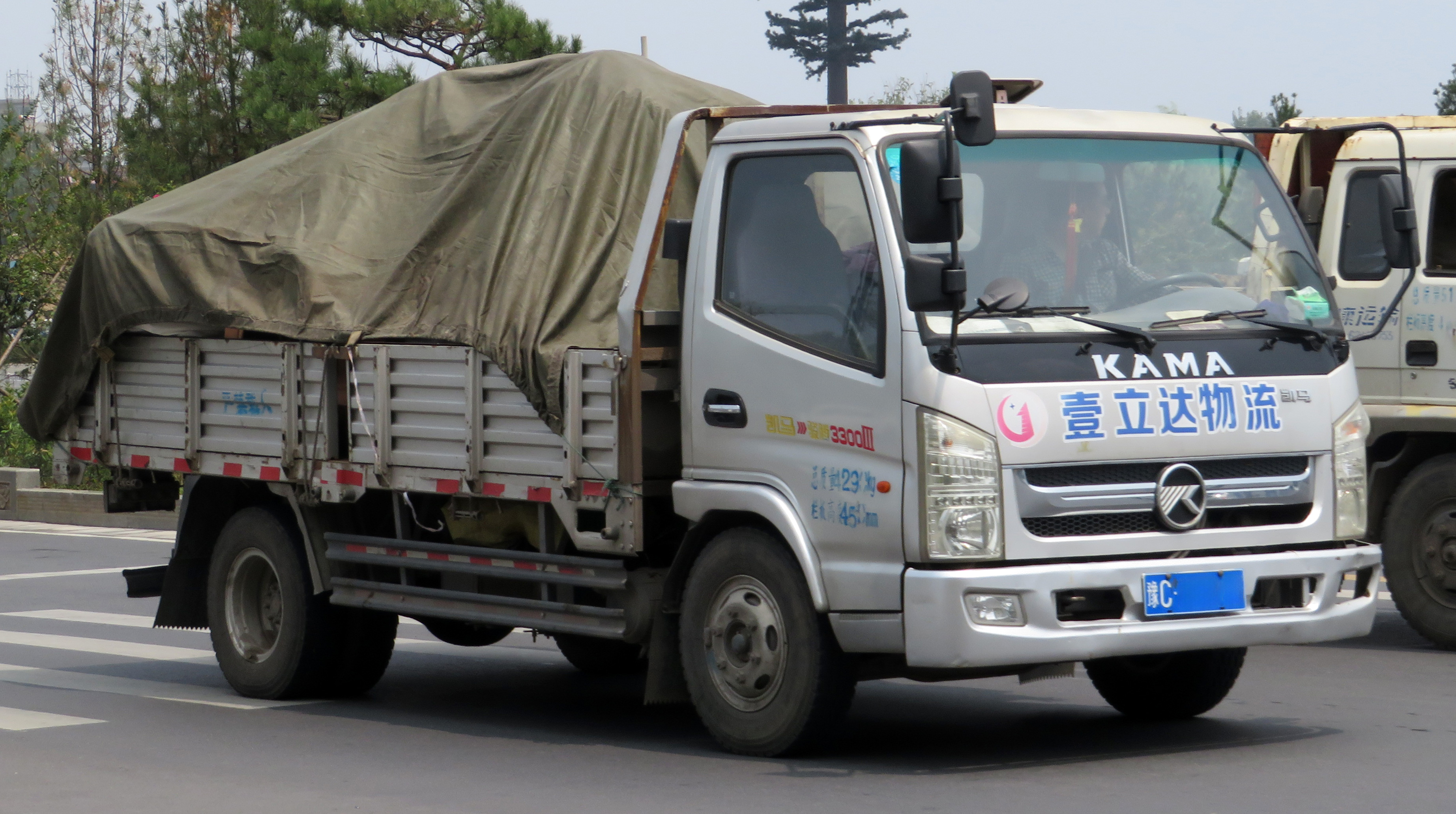
Dongfeng-Kama Junteng 3300

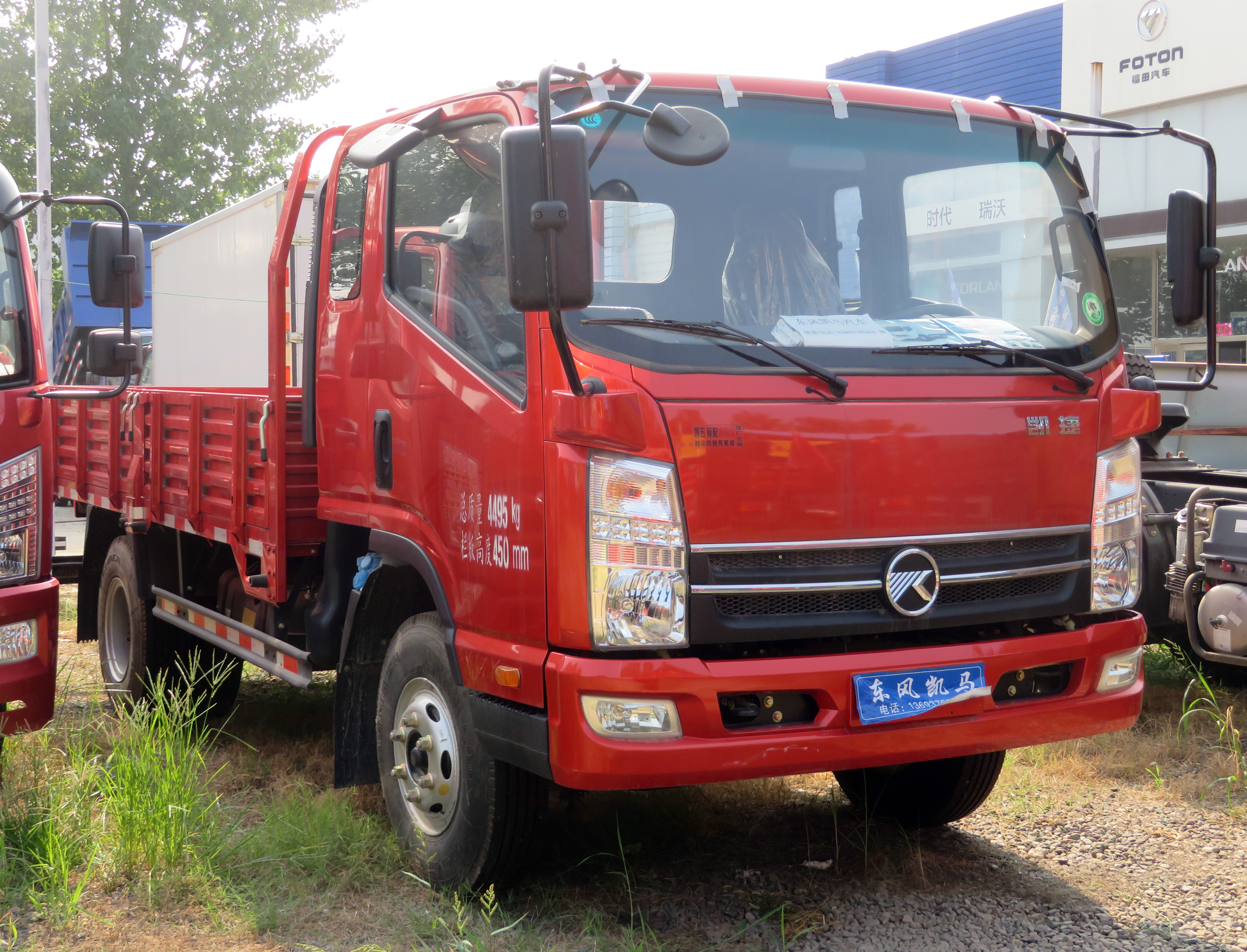
Dongfeng-Kama Kaijie 1900

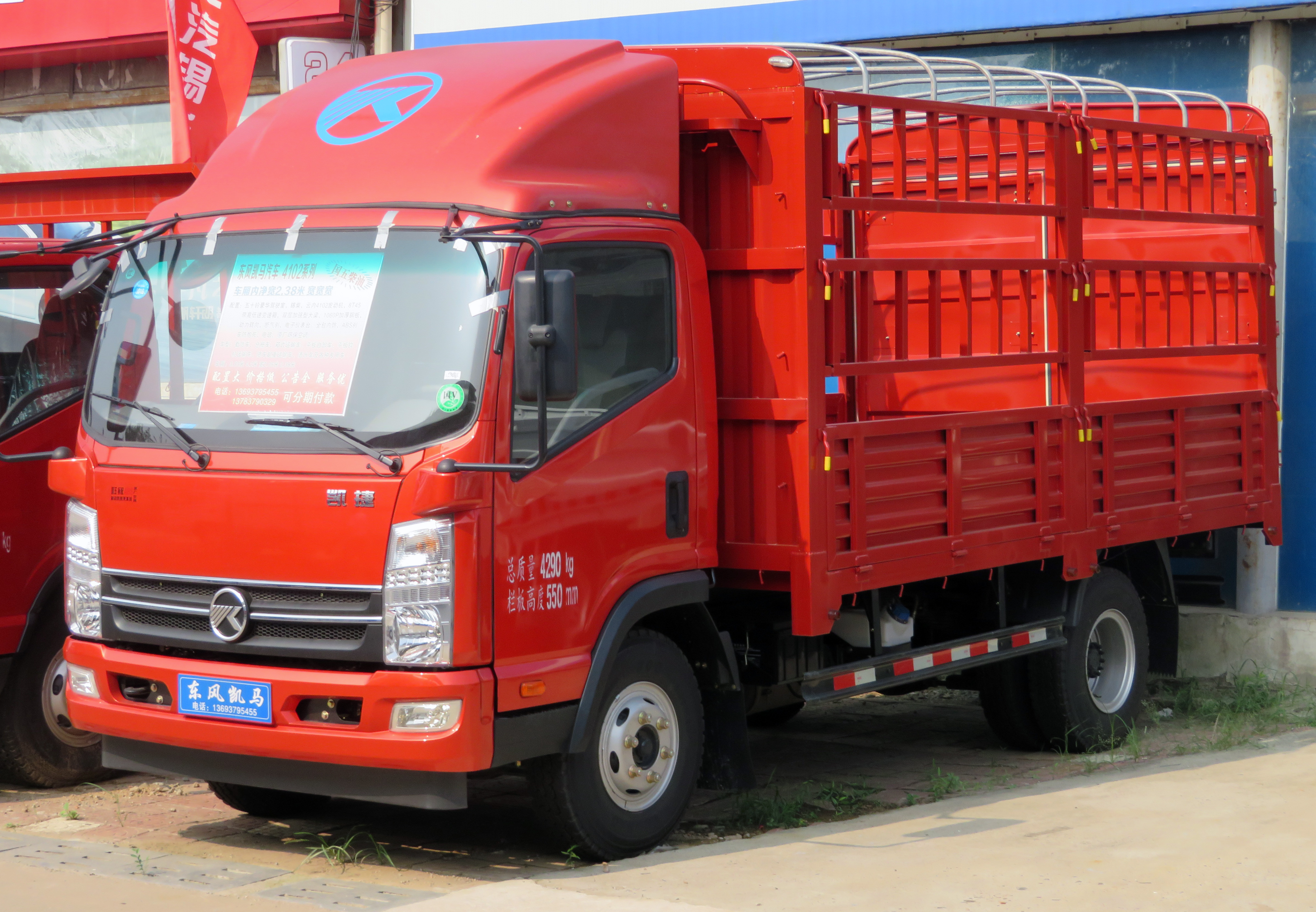
Dongfeng-Kama Kaijie 4102

=== Zedriv EV ===
On 6 April 2017, Sinomach founded automotive company Zedriv. Zedriv plans to make 4 electric vehicles before going bankrupt.
