= Sai Kong Din Tai =

Sai Kong Din Tai ทรายกองดินใต้
- Khwaeng
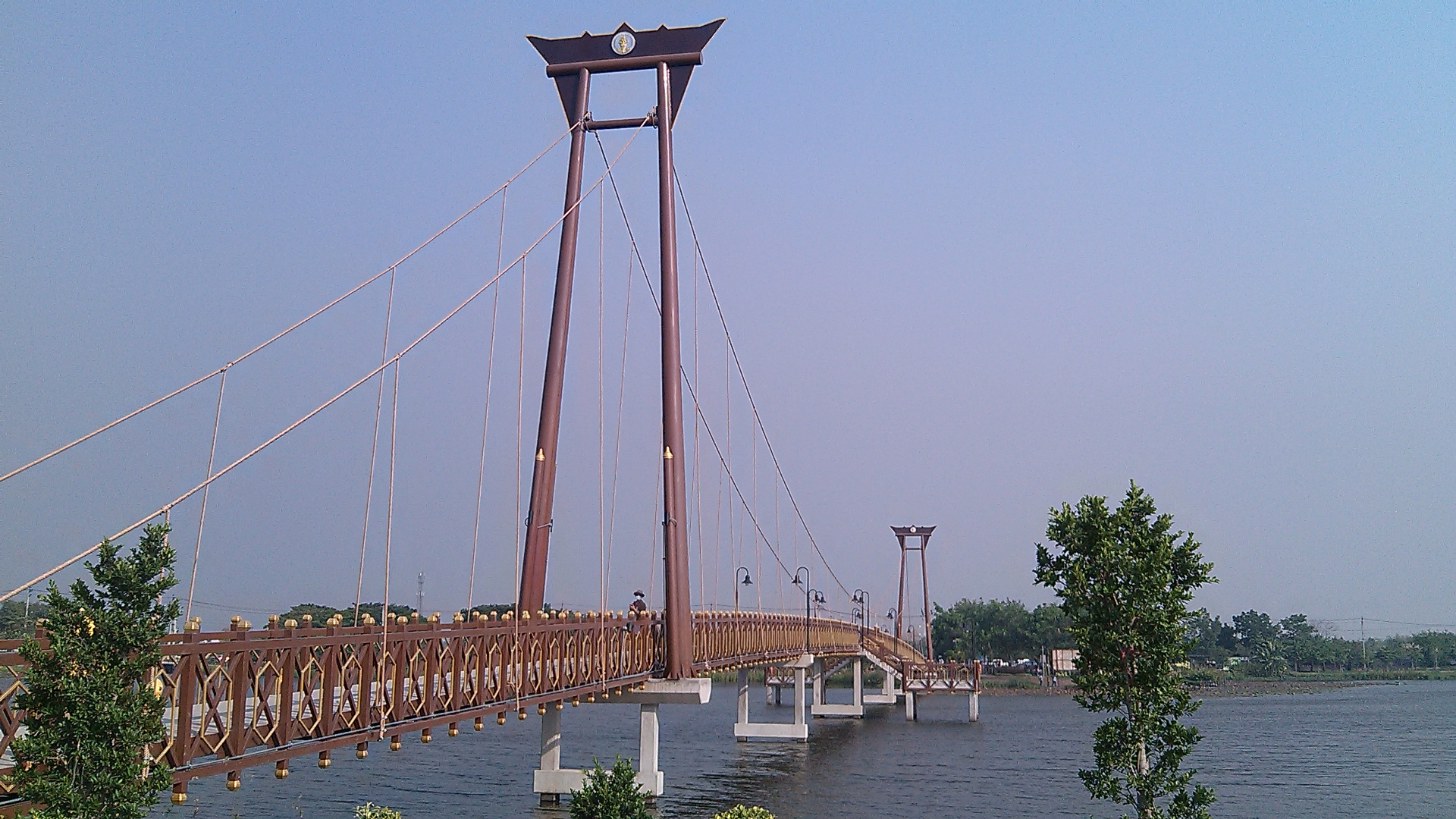
- Wari Phirom Park

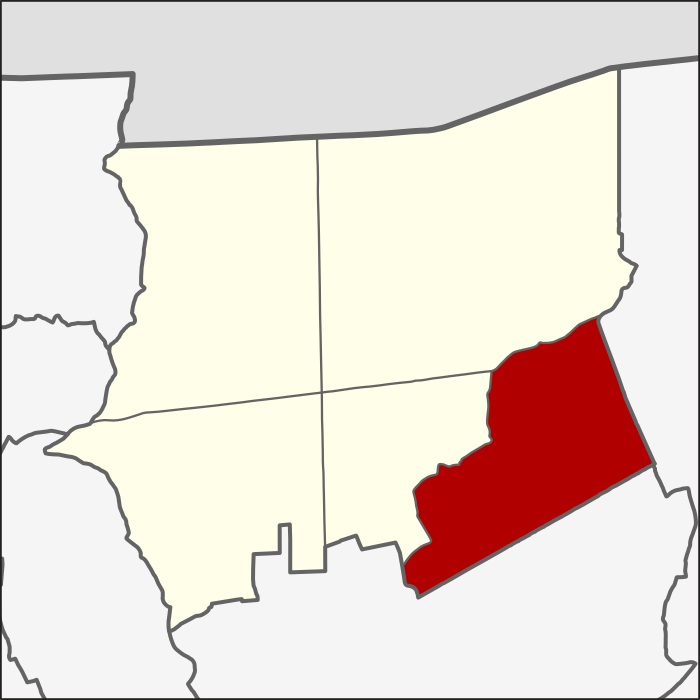
- Location in Khlong Sam Wa District
- Country: Thailand
- Province: Bangkok
- Khet: Khlong Sam Wa

Area
  - Total: 15.823 km^{2} (6.109 sq mi)

Population (2020)
  - Total: 17,164
- Time zone: UTC+7 (ICT)
- Postal code: 10510
- TIS 1099: 104605

Sai Kong Din Tai (Thai: ทรายกองดินใต้, pronounced [sāːj kɔ̄ːŋ dīn tâːj]) is a khwaeng (subdistrict) of Khlong Sam Wa District, in Bangkok, Thailand. In 2020, it had a total population of 17,164 people.
