= Bangkok Mass Transit Authority =

Main operator of public transit buses in Greater Bangkok, Thailand

Bangkok Mass Transit Authority (BMTA)

Overview
- Native name: องค์การขนส่งมวลชนกรุงเทพ
- Owner: Ministry of Transport
- Area served: Bangkok Metropolitan Region
- Locale: Bangkok; Nakhon Pathom; Nonthaburi; Pathum Thani; Samut Prakan; Samut Sakhon
- Transit type: Public transit buses within the Greater Bangkok area
- Number of lines: 118 Routes
- Daily ridership: 3 million people per day
- Key people: Kittikan Chomdoung Charuworapolkul (Director & CEO); Yuthana Yupparit (Chairman & President)
- Headquarters: Huai Khwang, Bangkok, Thailand

Operation
- Began operation: 1 October 1976
- Number of vehicles: 3,005 buses

Bangkok Mass Transit Authority (Thai: องค์การขนส่งมวลชนกรุงเทพ, RTGS: Ongkan Khonsong Muanchon Krung Thep pronounced [ʔōŋ.kāːn kʰǒn.sòŋ mūan.tɕʰōn krūŋ.tʰêːp]), also known as BMTA (ขสมก. pronounced [kʰɔ̌ː sɔ̌ː mɔː kɔː]), is the main operator of public transit buses within the Greater Bangkok area. It is the largest city bus system in Thailand. The Bangkok Mass Transit Authority offers bus and van routes throughout the city and its suburban provinces.

The BMTA is a state enterprise under Ministry of Transport that started operations on 1 October 1976 upon the purchase and combination of the transportation assets of private bus companies, most of which had faced crises due to sharply rising oil prices since 1973. The government, in 1975, addressed the crisis by setting up a public-private joint venture called the Metropolitan Transit Company, Limited (Thai: บริษัทมหานครขนส่ง จำกัด), but the effort failed to materialize. It tried again in 1976 by setting up BMTA as a fully state-owned enterprise under the control of the transport ministry.

Since then, the organization has been the main operator of city buses. However, some private bus companies opted to continue their service on certain routes under joint service contracts with BMTA instead of selling their assets to the state. Despite government subsidies, BMTA has posted losses from day one, resulting in deteriorating quality of service. During the 2020s, bus routes have been progressively transferred to Thai Smile Bus, operated by Thai Smile Group, which runs electric buses.

== About ==
The BMTA service area covers the Bangkok metropolis and its suburban areas in the adjacent provinces of Nonthaburi, Samut Prakan, Pathum Thani, Nakhon Pathom, and Samut Sakhon. It serves approximately three million passengers per day. The service hours are 05:00-23:00, except for a 24-hr night-owl service on some routes. As of March 2021, BMTA owned a fleet of 3,005 buses—1,520 ordinary buses and 1,485 air-conditioned buses. In addition to BMTA-owned buses, there are 3,485 privately owned contract buses, 1,113 contracted minibuses, 2,161 side-street songthaews, and 5,519 vans. In total, there were 15,857 buses and vans for 427 routes across eight zones.

- Zone 1: North (Hubs: Rangsit, Don Mueang, Bang Khen, Lam Luk Ka, Pathum Thani)
- Zone 2: Northeast (Hubs: Min Buri, Siam Park, Bang Kapi, Lat Krabang, Nong Jok, Prawet)
- Zone 3: Southeast (Hubs: Pak Nam, Samrong, Bangna, Bang Phli, Mega Bangna, Samut Prakan Crocodile Farm and Zoo)
- Zone 4: South and Central (Hubs: Khlong Toei, Thanon Tok, Sathu Pradit Pier, Rama III Rd, Rama IX Rd, Huai Khwang, Ratchadaphisek)
- Zone 5: Southwest (Hubs: Dao Khanong, Phra Pradaeng, Phra Samut Chedi, Samae Dam, Samut Sakhon, Chaeng Ron, Maha Chai Muang Mai)
- Zone 6: West (Hubs: Bangkhae, Thonburi, Wat Rai Khing & Samphran, Nakorn Pathom, Phasi Charoen, Sala Ya, Taling Chan)
- Zone 7: Northwest (Hubs: Nonthaburi, Pak Kret, Tha-it, Bang Yai, Bang Bua Thong, Nakhon In, Muang Thong Thani, Lak Si)
- Zone 8: Northeast and Central (Hubs: Siam Park, Bang Kapi, Ram Inthra, Lat Phrao, Huai Khwang, Chatuchak, Mo Chit, Bang Sue, Din Daeng, Ratchathewi)

== Financials ==
For fiscal year 2017 ending 30 September 2017, the BMTA reported revenues of 8,114 million baht, total assets of 8,127 million baht, and a net profit of minus 110,550 million baht.

BMTA's poor financial performance has prompted the State Enterprise Policy Office (SEPO) to step in with a plan for "business rehabilitation". Its central strategies are the purchase of 3,000 new buses to halve fuel costs and lower maintenance costs, and the adoption of automated ticketing to make 5,000 ticket-takers redundant. The Finance Ministry may help defray the hundreds of billions of BMTA debt when the BMTA reaches profitability.

== Fare collection ==
The BMTA allows riders to board a bus and pay with cash or coupons. In 2017, the government planned to implement a common ticketing system across all mass transit modes, allowing passengers to pay with a single smart card known as the Mangmoom Card.

In December 2017, the BMTA abandoned a plan to install automated cash collection boxes as impractical, after having installed 800 of the devices. It halted the planned installation of the remaining 1,800 machines. The move prompted a Bangkok Post editorial to note that, "The fiasco reminds Bangkok commuters of just how poorly served they are and how inefficient and incompetent the agency [BMTA] is. Similar to its ageing bus fleet, the BMTA itself has reached a stage where its management desperately needs a revamp."

The cash box plan was part of the agency's 1.6 billion baht automated bus fare collection project that also covers the installation of e-ticket reading machines on all 2,600 buses serving Bangkok routes. Since October 2017, 800 buses has installed the cash boxes, which required passengers to feed in coins one-by-one. The "improvement" proved far too slow to be practicable.

The change would have resulted in the "replacement" of 2,600 bus conductors, according to the chairman of the Bangkok Mass Transit Authority. The chairman originally stated that he expected workers would take up early retirement packages once all the buses were equipped with cashless card readers.

== Bus fleet ==
BMTA operates air-conditioned and ordinary buses from various makers, most of which are Japanese. The air-conditioned bus fleet consists of buses from Hino, Isuzu, Daewoo, and Mercedes-Benz (standard and articulated). The ordinary bus fleet consists of buses from Hino, Isuzu, and Mitsubishi Fuso. Ordinary buses are being phased out. Most buses are diesel powered, but they are being converted to cleaner and cheaper natural gas (NGV). It operates new routes of NGV-powered vans, shuttling people between city center and suburban communities.

The BMTA has been working for 11 years to procure 489 natural gas-powered buses to replace its ageing fleet and is expected to complete the task in 2018. It plans to buy 35 electric buses and 2,476 hybrid buses in the future.

As of March 2021, the BMTA fleet consists of the following bus

=== Air-Conditioned Buses ===
BMTA Current Air-Conditioned Bus Fleet

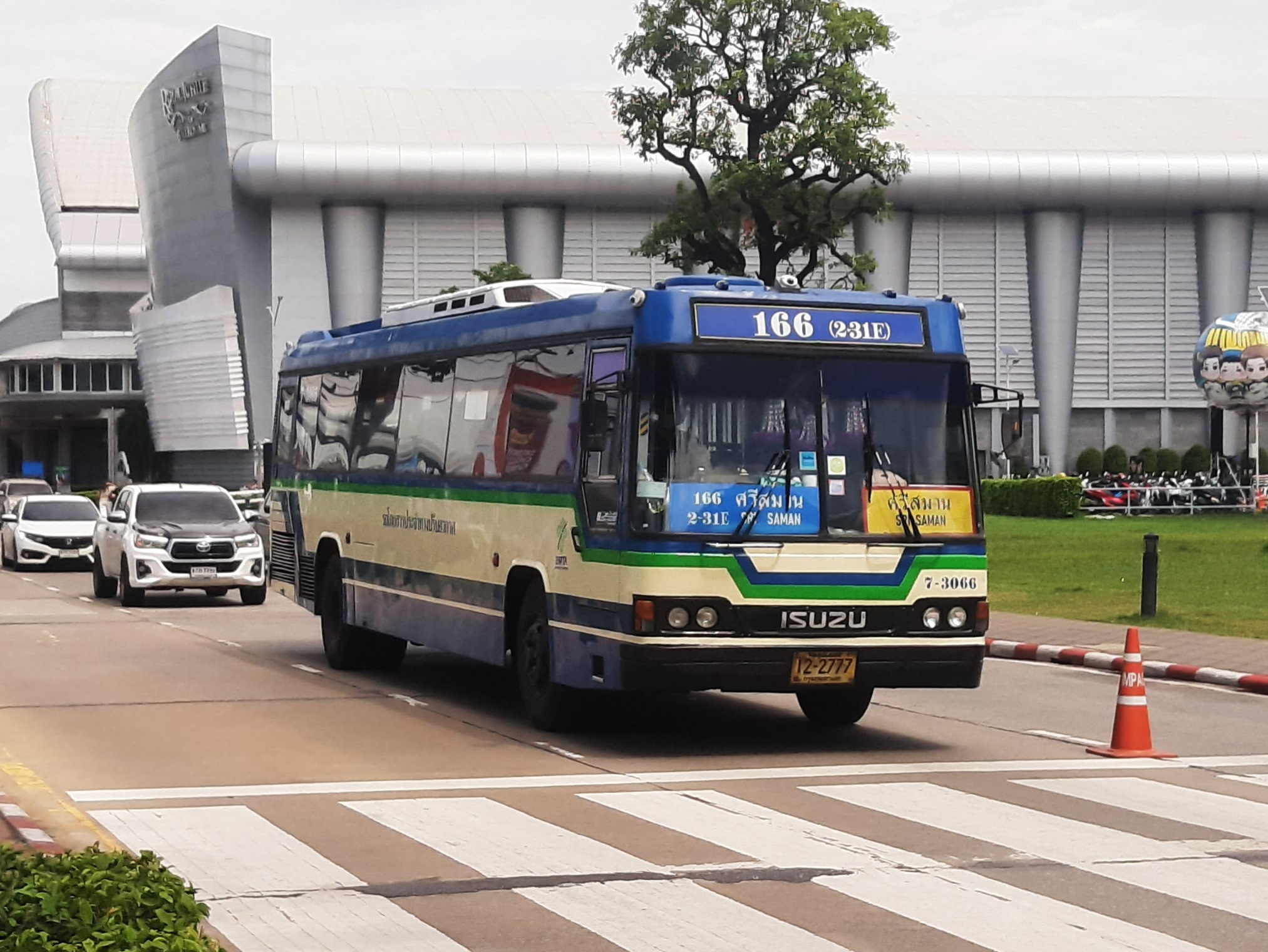
Isuzu CQA650A/T

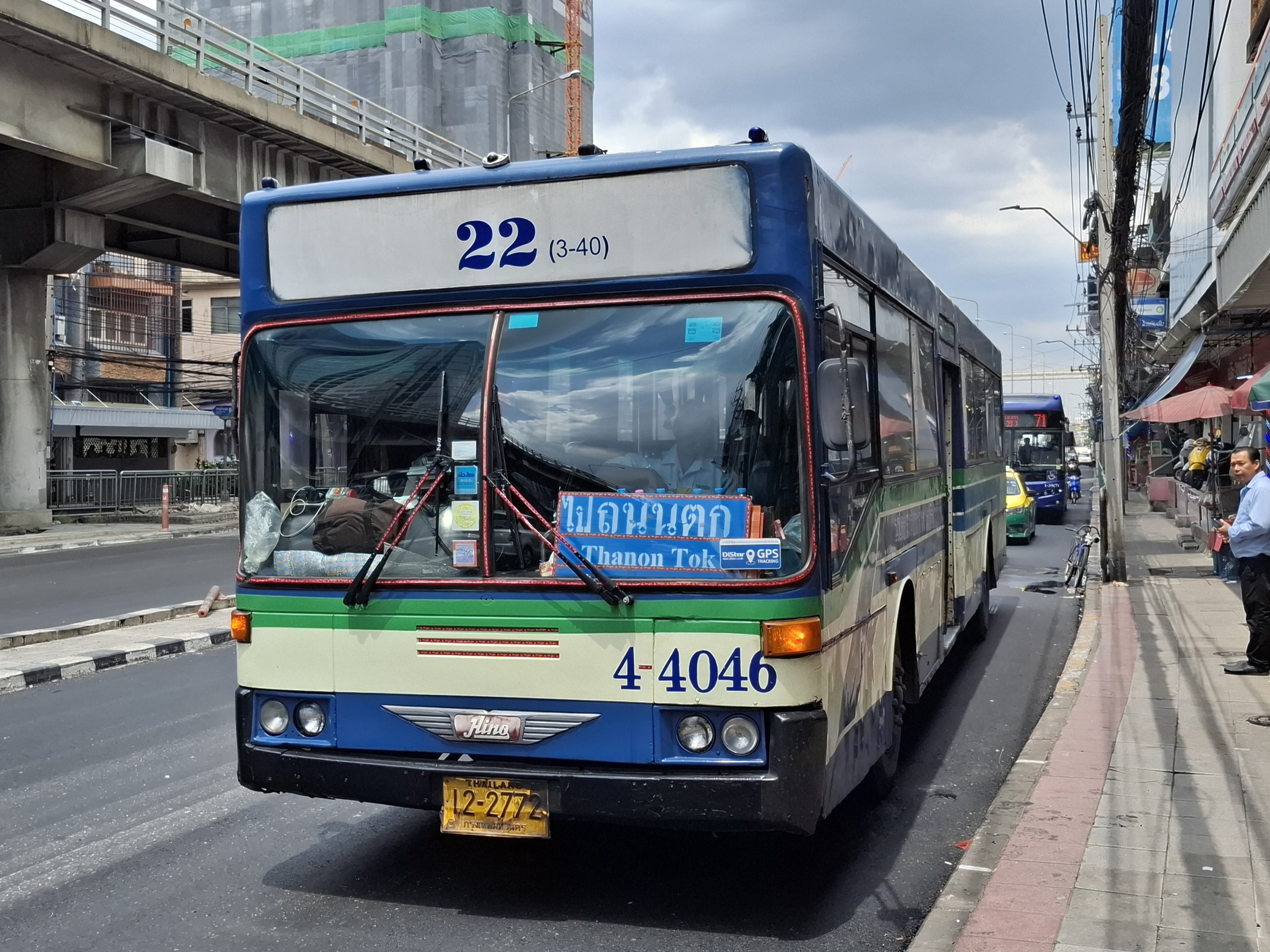
Hino HU3KSKL

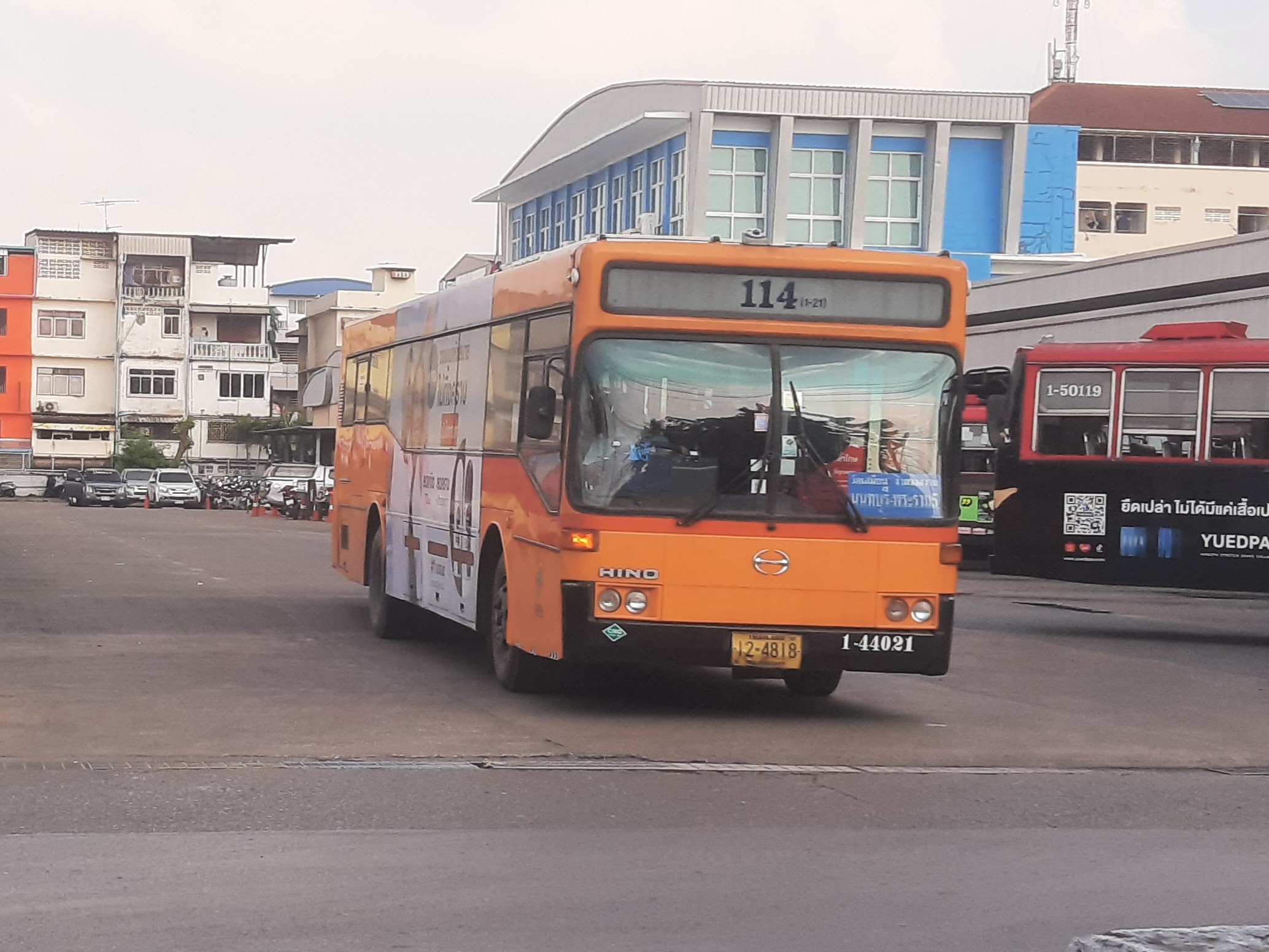
Hino RU1JSSL

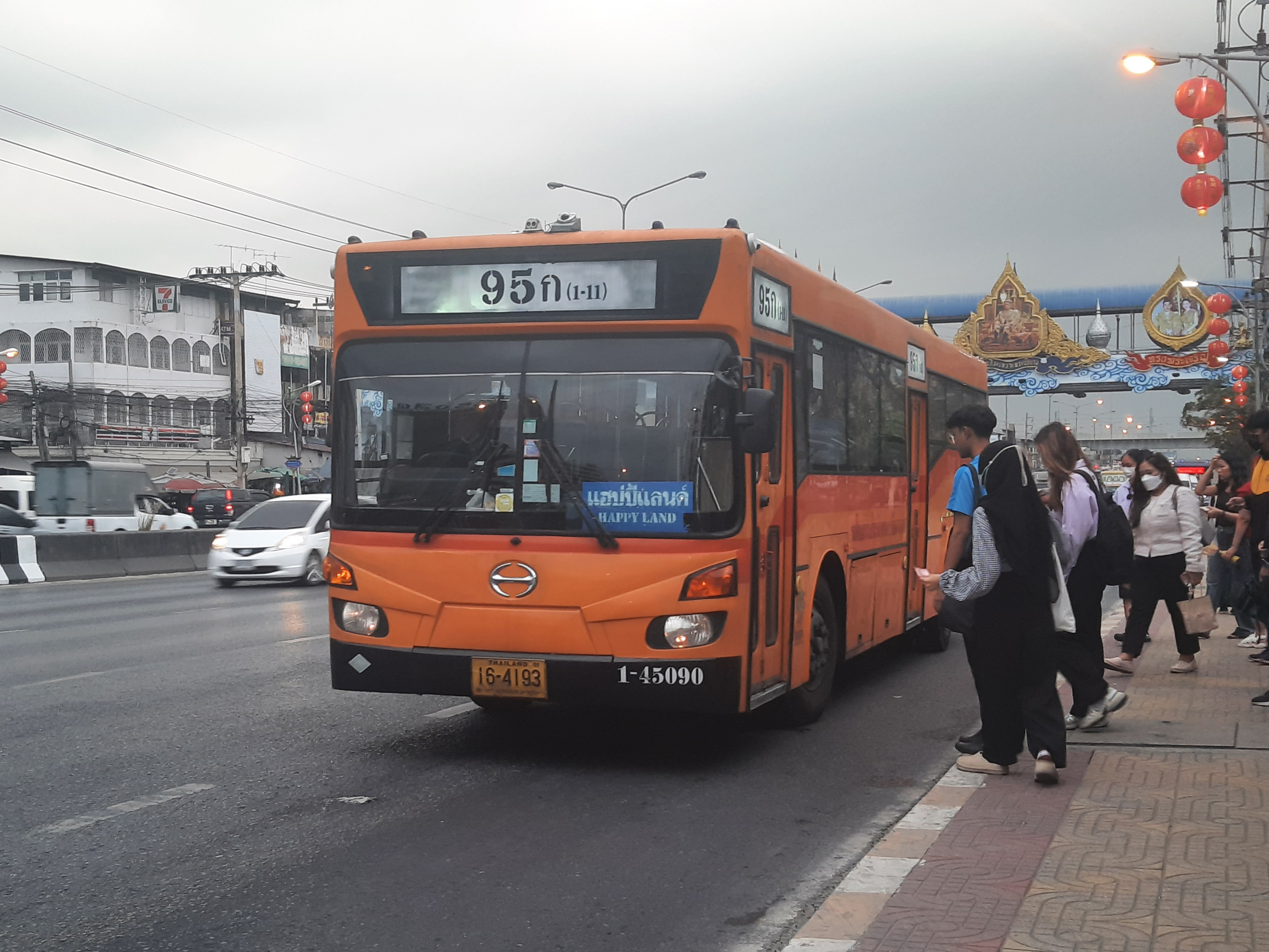
Hino RUJSSL (Renovated)

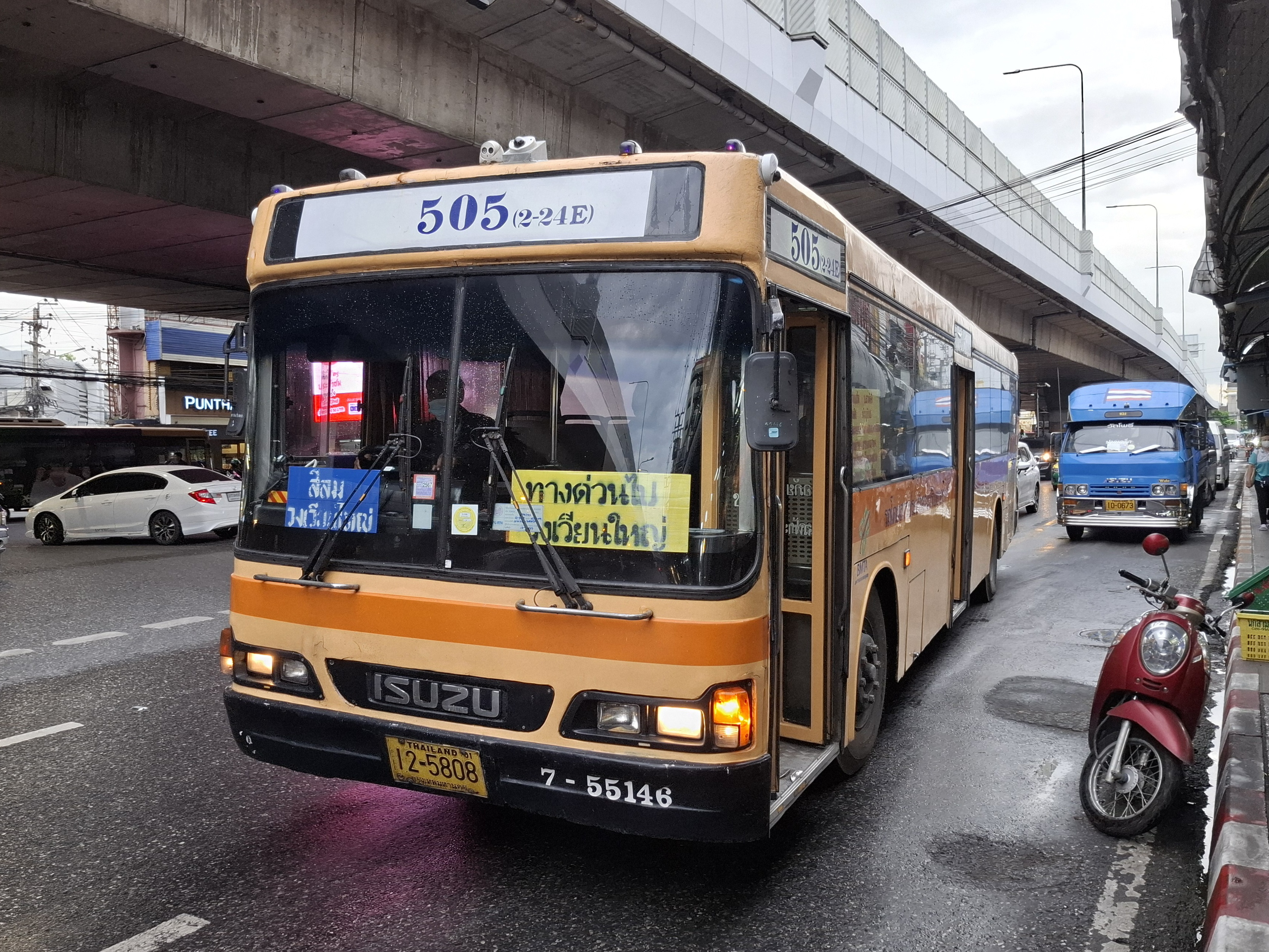
Isuzu LV223S

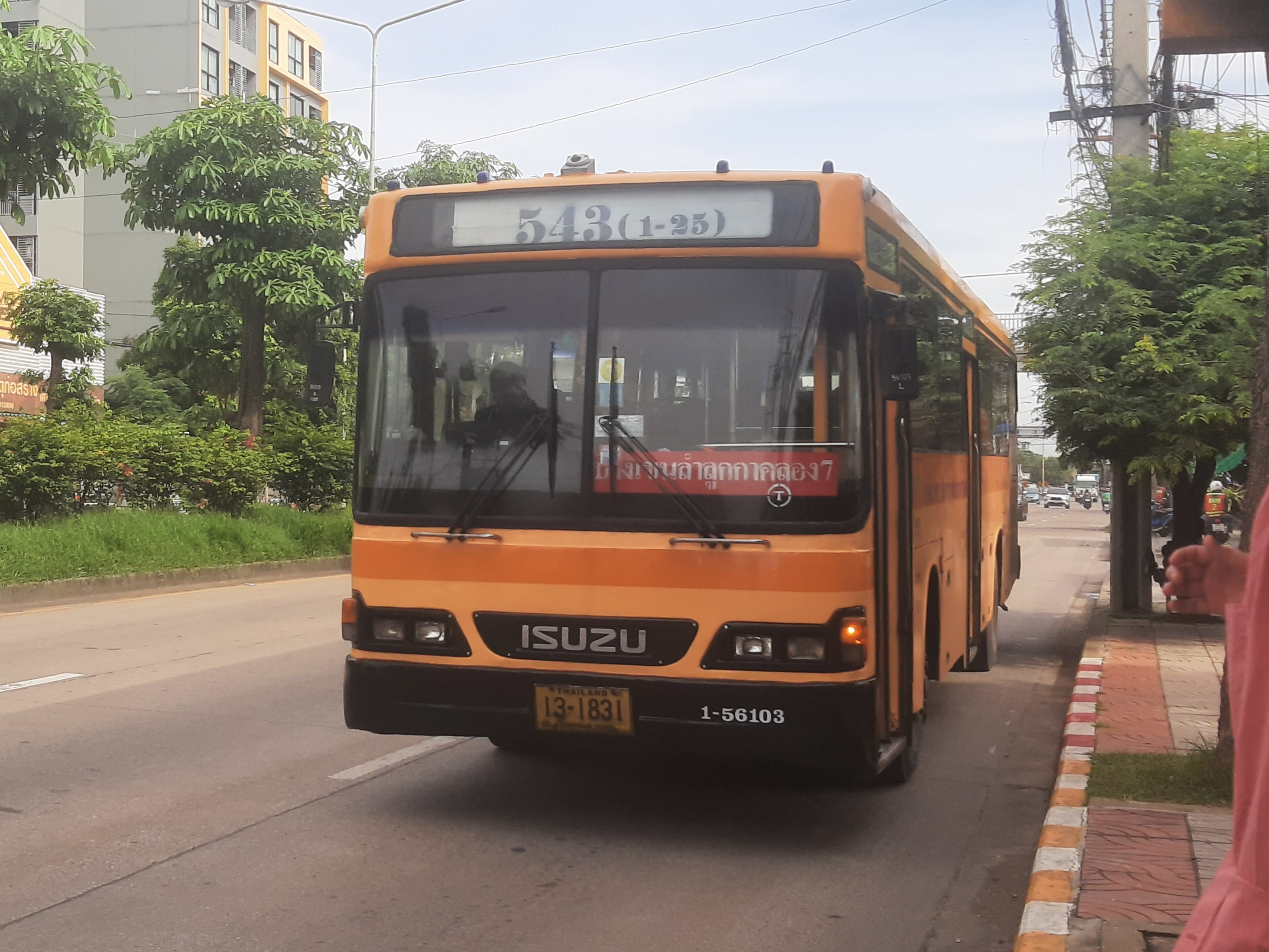
Isuzu LV423R

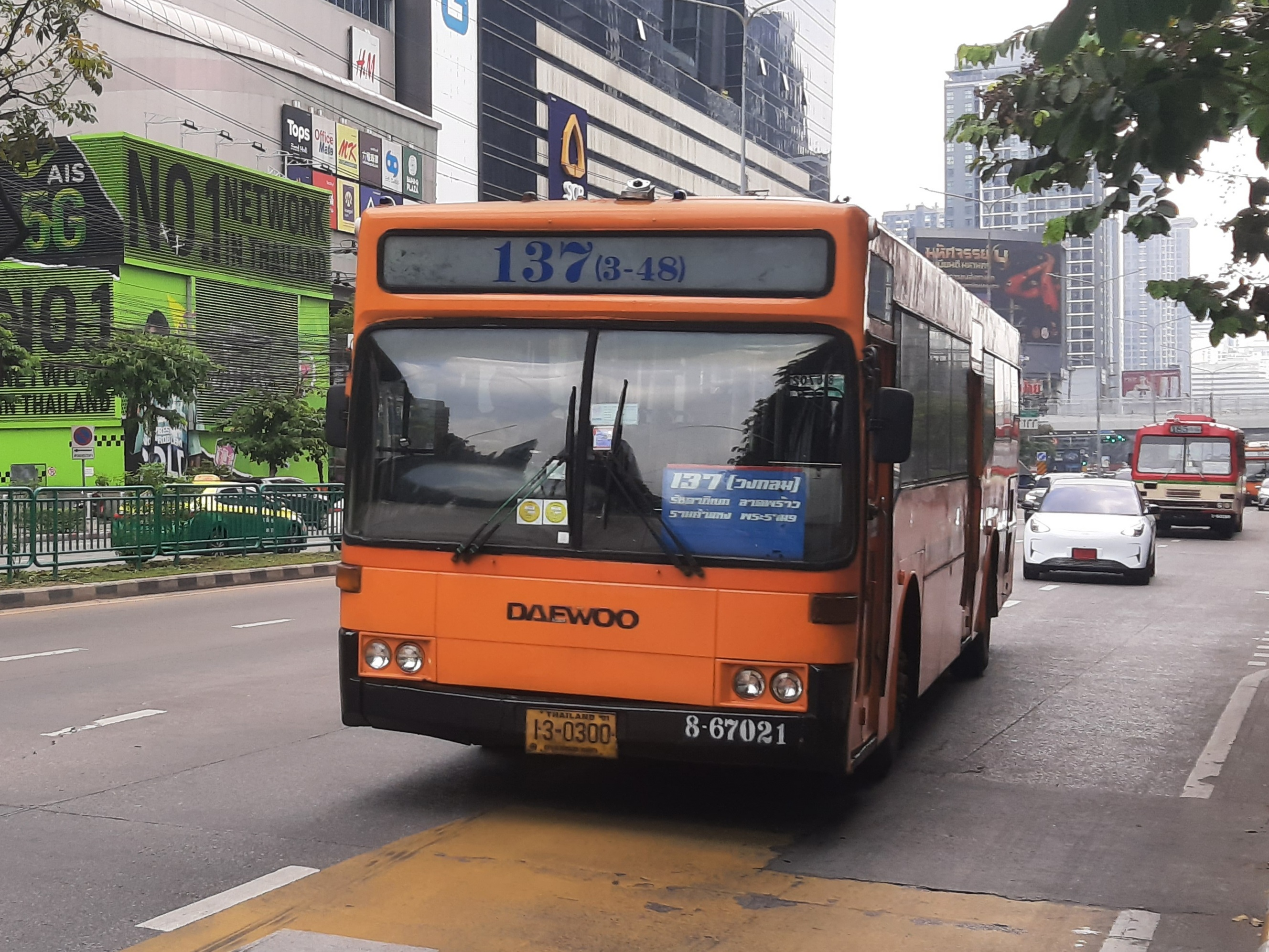
Daewoo BH115H

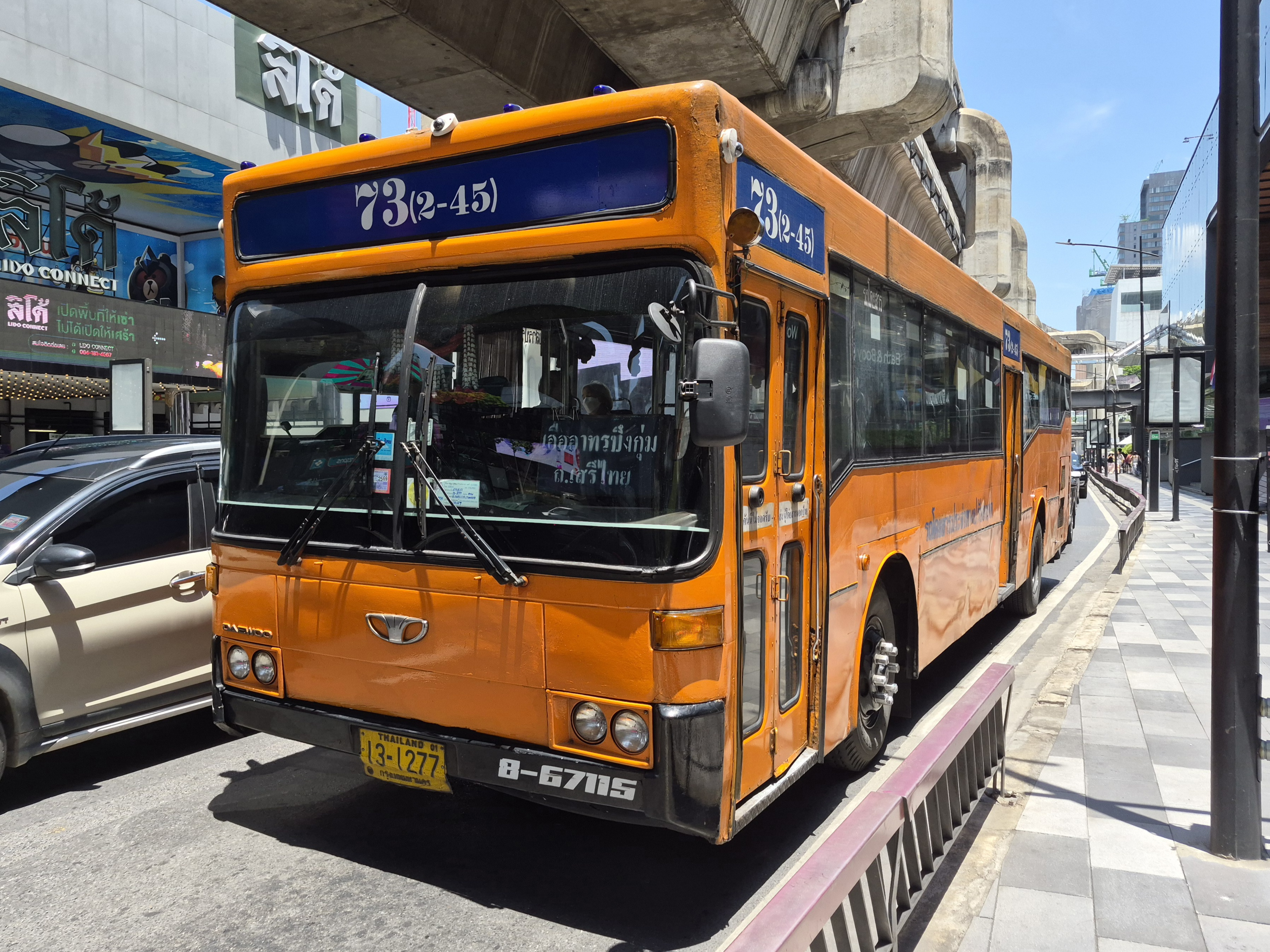
Daewoo BH115

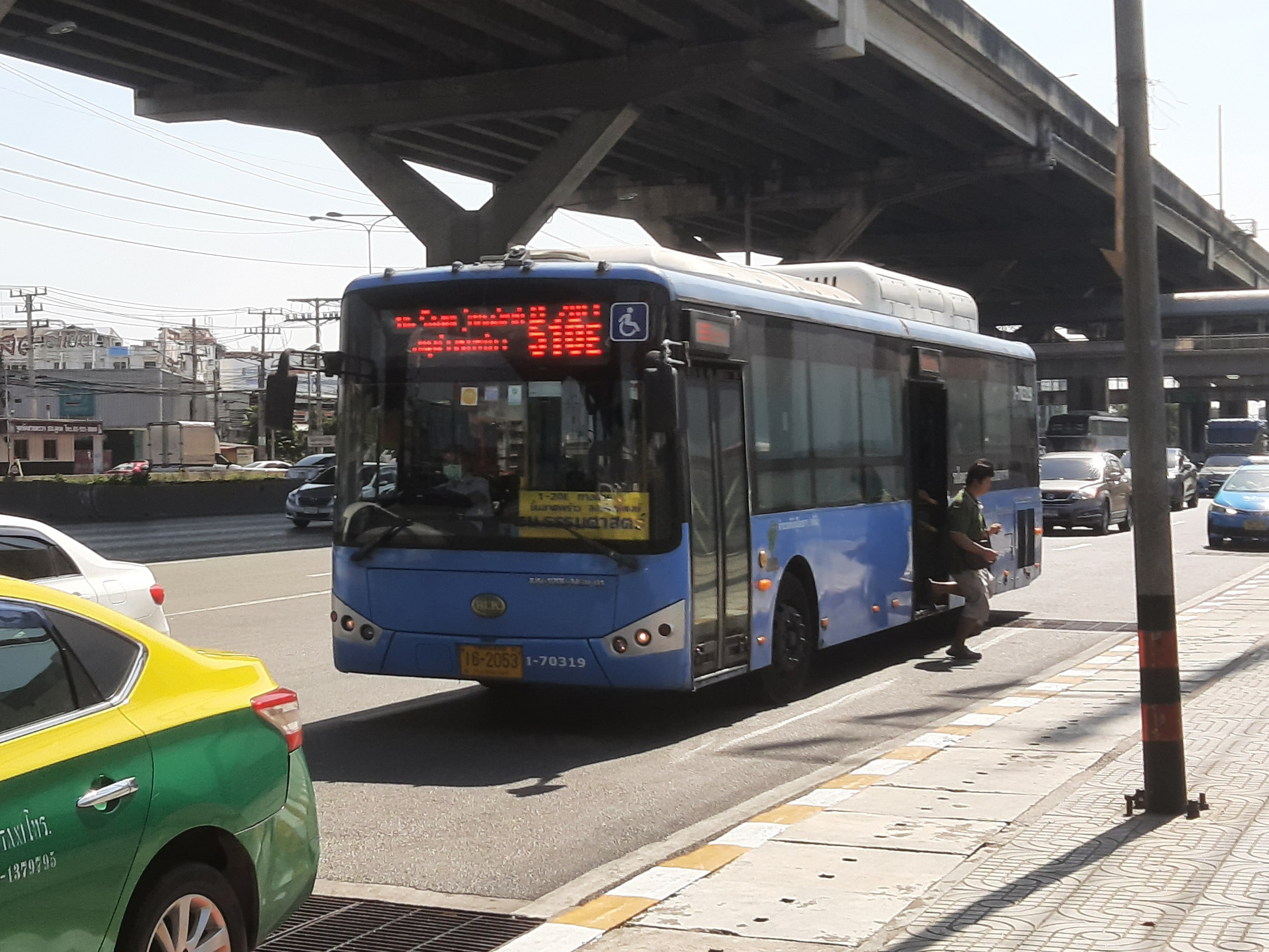
Bonluck JXK6120L-NGV-01

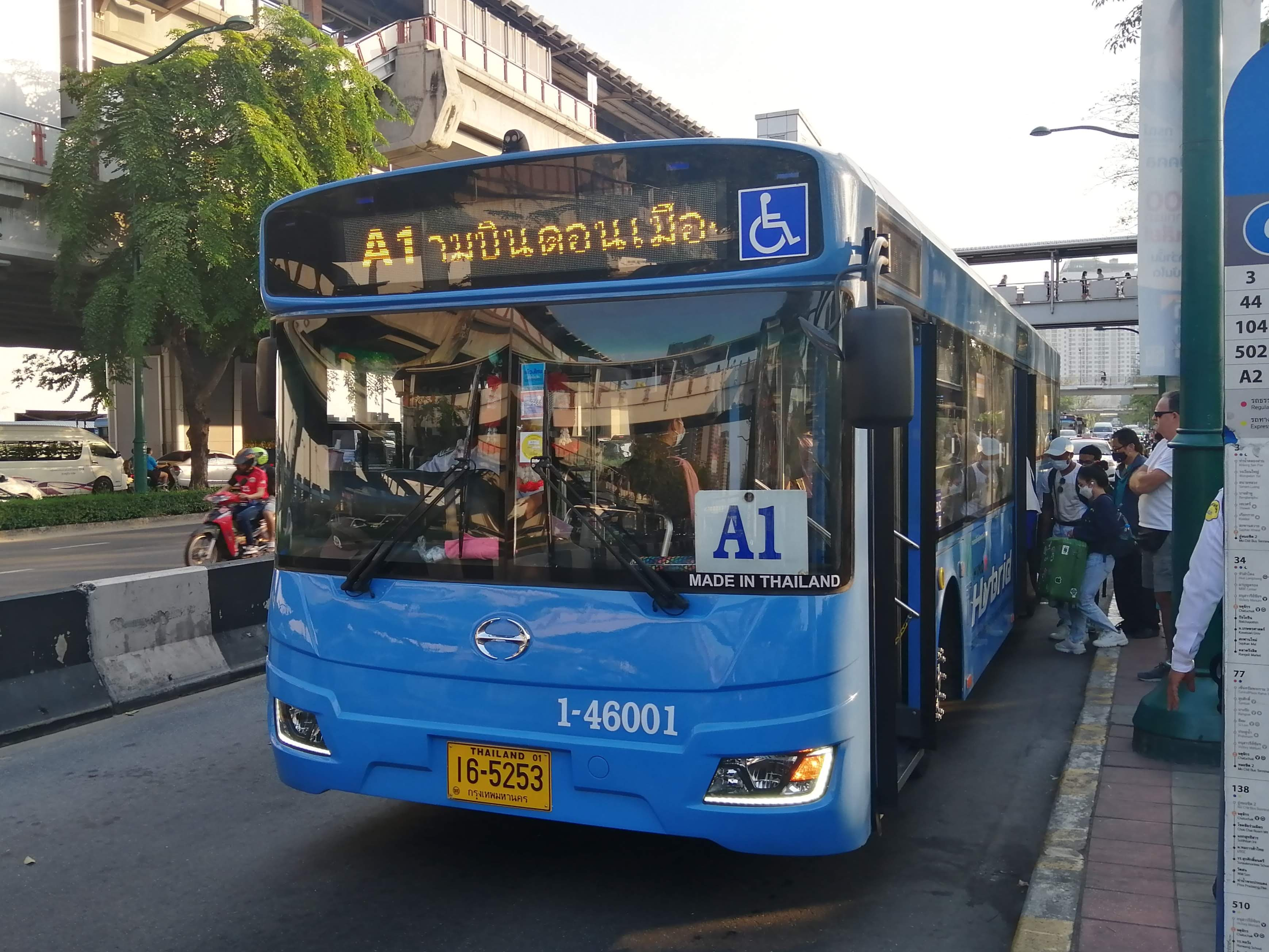
Hino HU2ASKP-VJT

Model	Year Introduced	In Service	Quantity by Zone								No Number.	Status	Notes
Model	Year Introduced	In Service	1	2	3	4	5	6	7	8	No Number.	Status	Notes
Hino HU3KSKL	1995	79	—	24	—	55	—				40xx	In Service	
Isuzu CQA650 A/T	1995	100	15	—					85	—	30xx	In Service	
Hino RU1JSSL	1998	197	13	34	60	40	50	—			44xxx	In Service	
Isuzu LV223S	1998	200	18	—				55	69	58	55xxx	In Service	
Hino RU1JSSL	2001	125	41	12	47	7	18	—			45xxx	In Service	
Isuzu LV423R	2001	123	5	—				100	12	6	56xxx	In Service	
Daewoo BH115H	2001	16	—							16	67001-67060	In Service	
Daewoo BH115	2001	35	—							35	67061-67250	In Service	
Bonluck JXK6120L-NGV-01	2018	489	123	105	108	—	150	—			70xxx	In Service	
Hino HU2ASKP-VJT	2020	1	1	—							46001	Not In Service	Donated from JICA
Total		1,363	216	175	215	102	218	155	166	115			

=== Ordinary Buses ===
BMTA Current Ordinary Bus Fleet

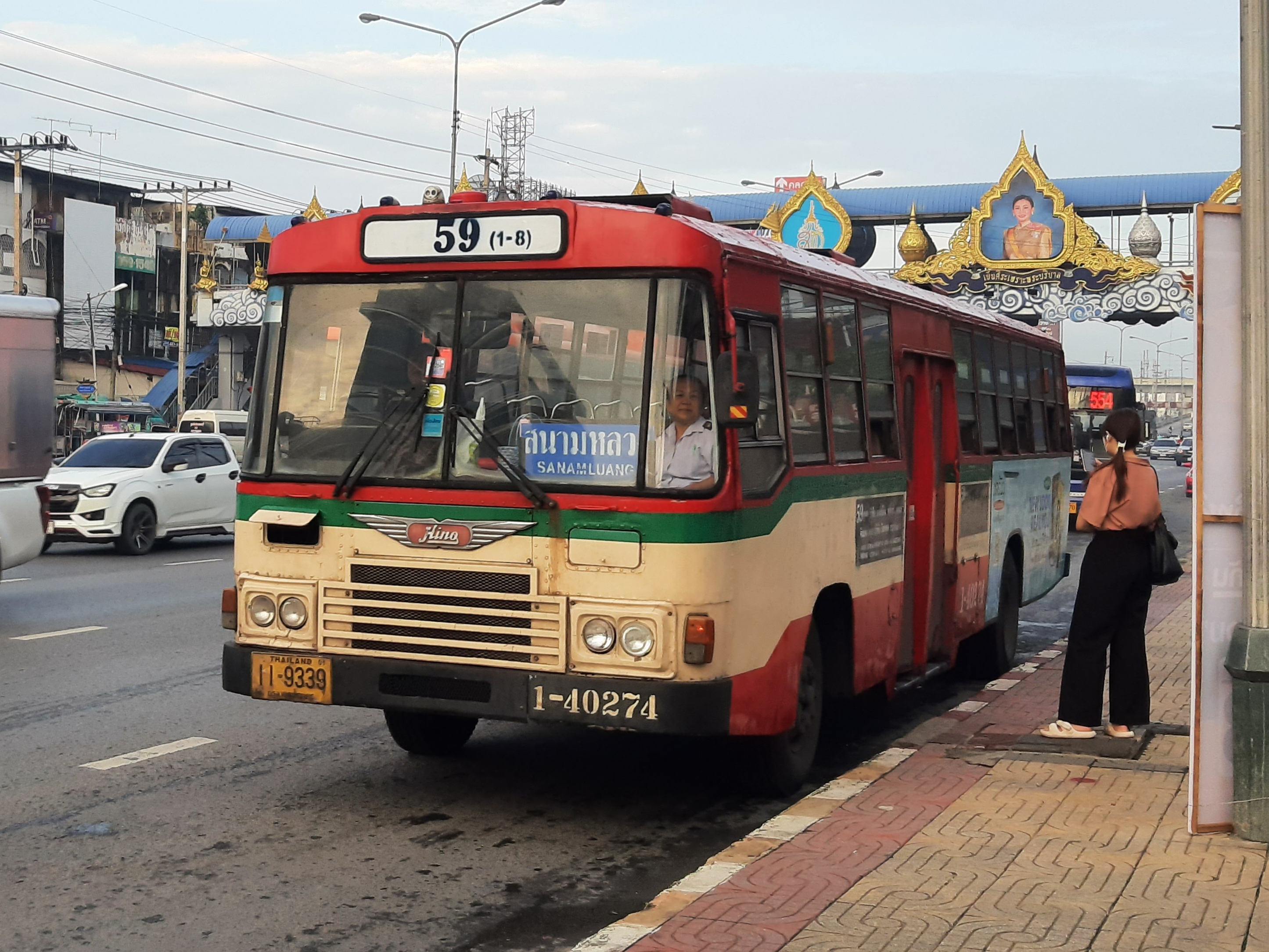
Hino AK176

Isuzu MT111QB

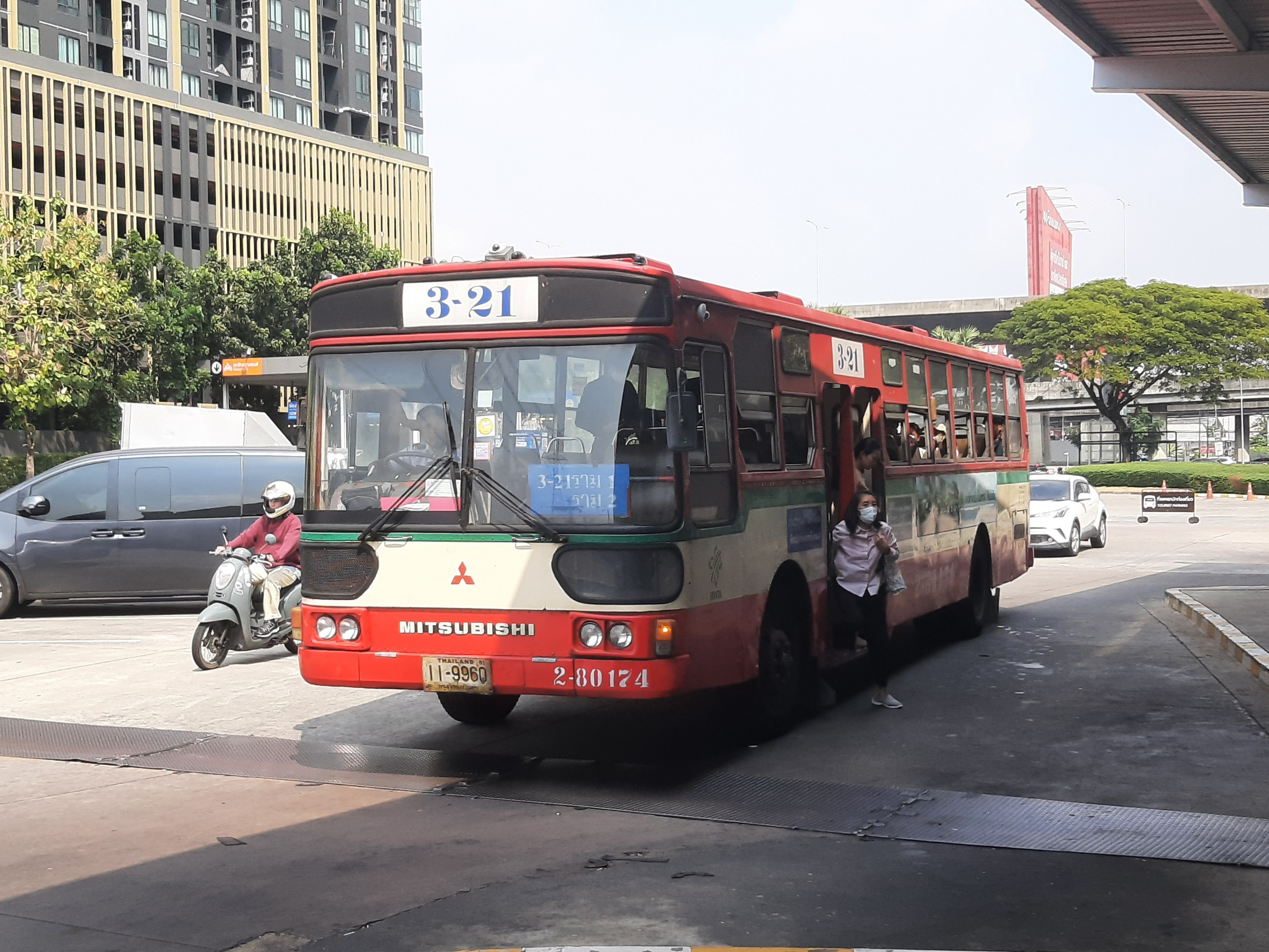
Mitsubishi Fuso RP118

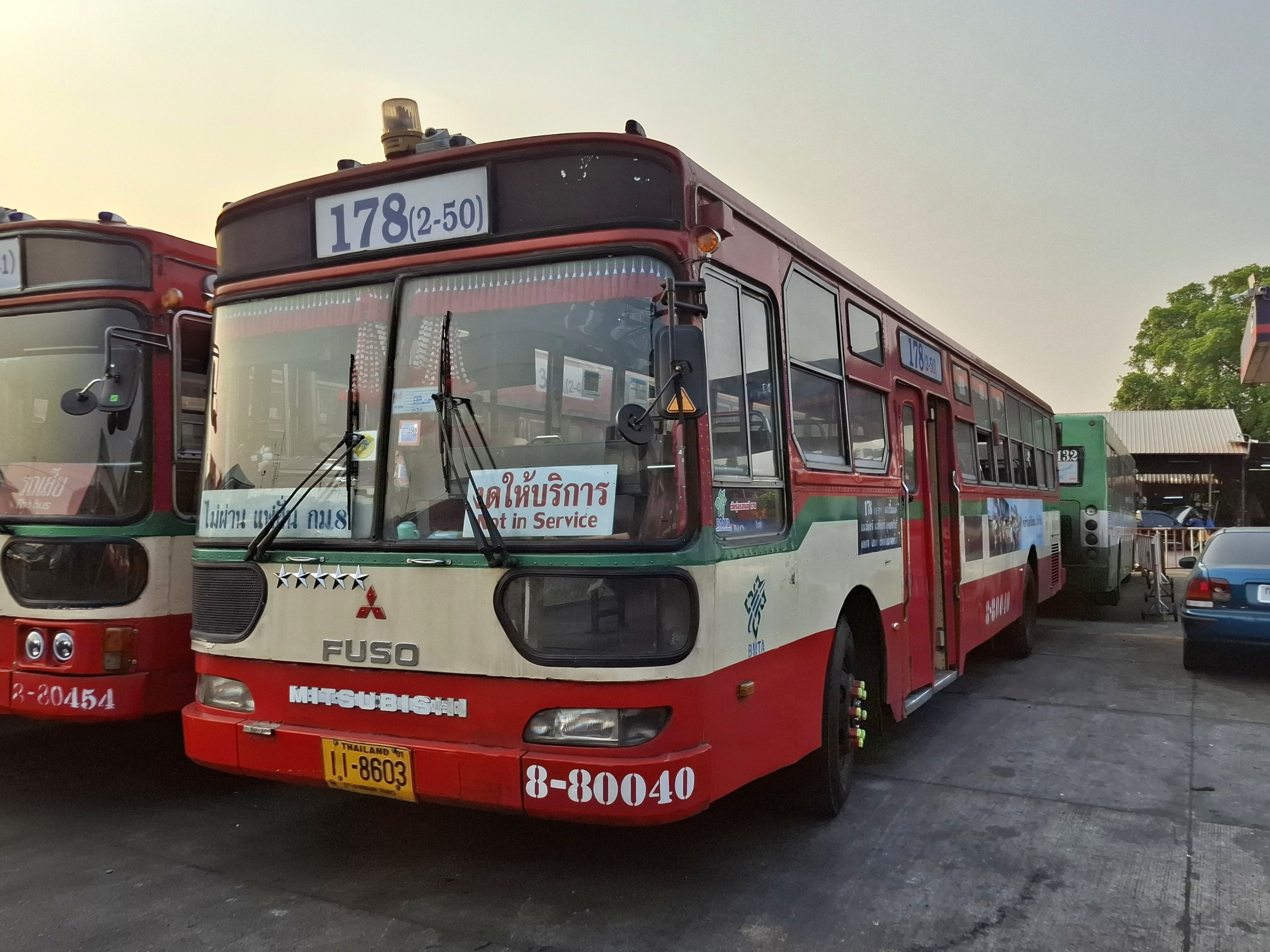
Mitsubishi Fuso RP118 (Renovated 1)

Model	Year Introduced	In Service	Quantity by Zone								No Number.	Status	Notes
Model	Year Introduced	In Service	1	2	3	4	5	6	7	8	No Number.	Status	Notes
Hino AK176	1991	490	58	—	156	105	171	—			40xxx	In Service	
Isuzu MT111QB	1991	529	123	—				171	205	30	50xxx	In Service	
Mitsubishi Fuso RP118	1991	500	—	214	—	111	—			175	80xxx	In Service	1 were renovated in 2016 (8-80040)
Total		1,519	181	214	156	216	171	171	205	205			

== See also ==
- Buses in Bangkok
- BRT (Bangkok)
- MRT
- Bus Line 8 (Bangkok)
- List of rapid transit systems
