= China Machinery Engineering Corporation =

Construction and engineering company

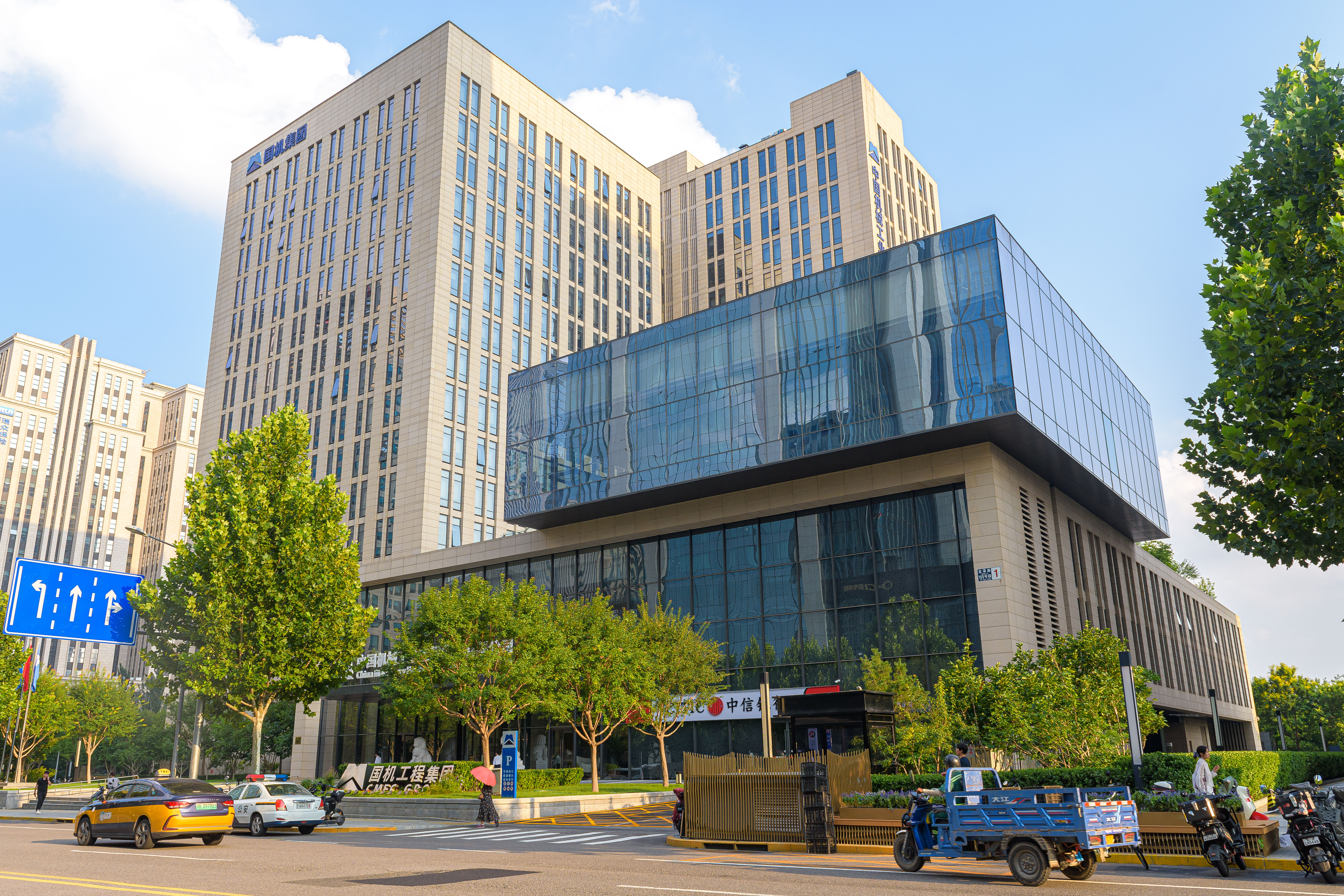
- Headquarters of CMEC
- Native name: 中国机械设备工程股份有限公司
- Type: Subsidiary
- Founded: 1978
- Headquarters: Xicheng District, Beijing, China
- Area served: Worldwide
- Key people: Sun Bai (Chairman and Executive Director)
- Parent: China National Machinery Industry Corporation (Sinomach)
- Website: cmec.com

China Machinery Engineering Corporation (CMEC) is a construction and engineering company, forming one part of the China National Machinery Industry Corporation (Sinomach) group of companies. A specialization of CMEC is the construction of power projects in generation, transmission, and distribution.

The company is present in Turkey with representative offices in Istanbul and Ankara. CMEC has operated in Turkey since the mid-1980s, and operations in the country accounted for 5% of global revenue by 2013. The total value of projects in Turkey amounted to 3 billion US dollars as reported in mid-2013 by the company with another 1 billion US dollars in project revenue set to be added to the total by the end of 2013. The work it takes on in Turkey includes the construction of a 600 MW supercritical thermal power plant, a project signed in 2007. Moving into investment, the company announced in 2013 the creation of an investment fund, based on its own equity capital and lines of credit from Chinese financial institutions, for power projects in Turkey.

It signed a deal with Argentina in 2010 to rehabilitate the Belgrano Cargas freight network, part of a series of railways that cross the central and northern parts of the country. In 2013, financing was announced for the project with a loan of 2.47 billion US dollars from China Development Bank to finance the bulk of the costs. A second deal was signed in September 2015, doubling the original investment to 4.8 billion dollars.

CMEC also built and partially owns two power plants in Nigeria, Omotosho Power Plants in Ondo State

In January 2016, the company signed a 150 million euro deal with the city, Tomislavgrad, in Herzegovina, to build a wind farm. The project will be finished in 2017.
