= Seri Thai Park =

Park in Khlong Kum, Thailand

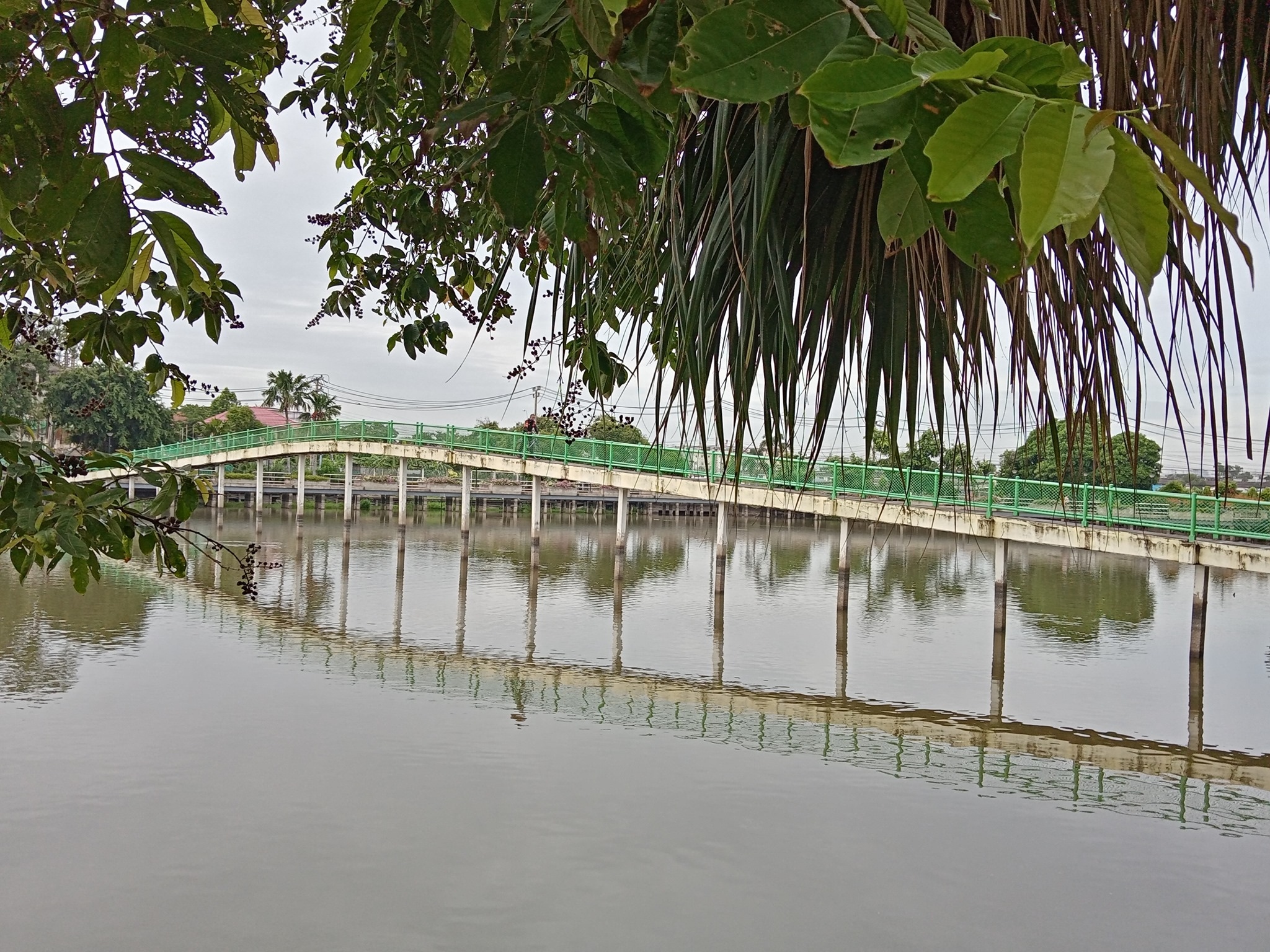
- White bridge in the park
- Interactive map of Seri Thai Park
- Type: Urban park
- Location: Soi Seri Thai 57, Seri Thai rd, Khlong Kum, Bueng Kum, Bangkok
- Coordinates: 13°47′13.53″N 100°40′25.55″E
- Area: 138 acres (56 ha)
- Created: 1997
- Operator: Bangkok Metropolitan Administration (BMA)
- Status: Open year round
- Public transit: BMTA buses

Seri Thai Park (Thai: สวนเสรีไทย, RTGS: Suan Seri Thai, pronounced [sǔan sěː.rīː tʰāj]), previously known as Bueng Khum (บึงกุ่ม) or Bueng Ta Thong (บึงตาทอง), is a public park in Bangkok, Thailand. Originally a large pond, it was redeveloped into a reservoir to combat flooding in Bangkok and renamed to honour the Seri Thai (Free Thai Movement) of World War II in 1997.

== History ==
The park was developed from the pond which covered the area along Seri Thai road. The former name was Bueng Khum (บึงกุ่ม) or Bueng Ta Thong (บึงตาทอง). Later on, Bang Kapi District Office had revised and developed the park following H.M. King Bhumibol Adulyadej (Rama IX)'s Initiation Project to be a large rainwater reservoir from the eastern part of Bangkok to prevent inundation issue.

Also, the 14.4 hectares of surrounding area was simultaneously developed.

On November 12, 1987, the park was transferred to be under Department of Environment's responsibility. In year 1996, it was extended to cover the rest 41.6 hectares of land area and created one of nine forest park according to the "Forest Park Development Project of BMA in order to commemorate the Fiftieth Anniversary (Golden Jubilee) Celebrations of His Majesty's Accession to the Throne".

It was named Bueng Khum Water Park (สวนน้ำบึงกุ่ม) and changed to be Seri Thai Park to honour Seri Thai or Free Thai Movement.

It was officially opened on August 16, 1997, which was the 52nd Anniversary Day of Thai Peace Day.

== Park components ==
Seri Thai park is unique and different from other parks by its natural characteristic due to the well adaptation to the former pond which maintained the previous condition; however, there were additions of more facilities synchronized with existing environment. The park atmosphere comprises plenty of large shady trees allocating along with water stream; that gives the natural feeling for the visitors. Besides, the park also provides playgrounds, outdoor weight training ground, pavilions, fruit orchard, and the Free Thai Memorial Library and Museum.
