= Krathum Rai, Bangkok =

Krathum Rai กระทุ่มราย
- Khwaeng
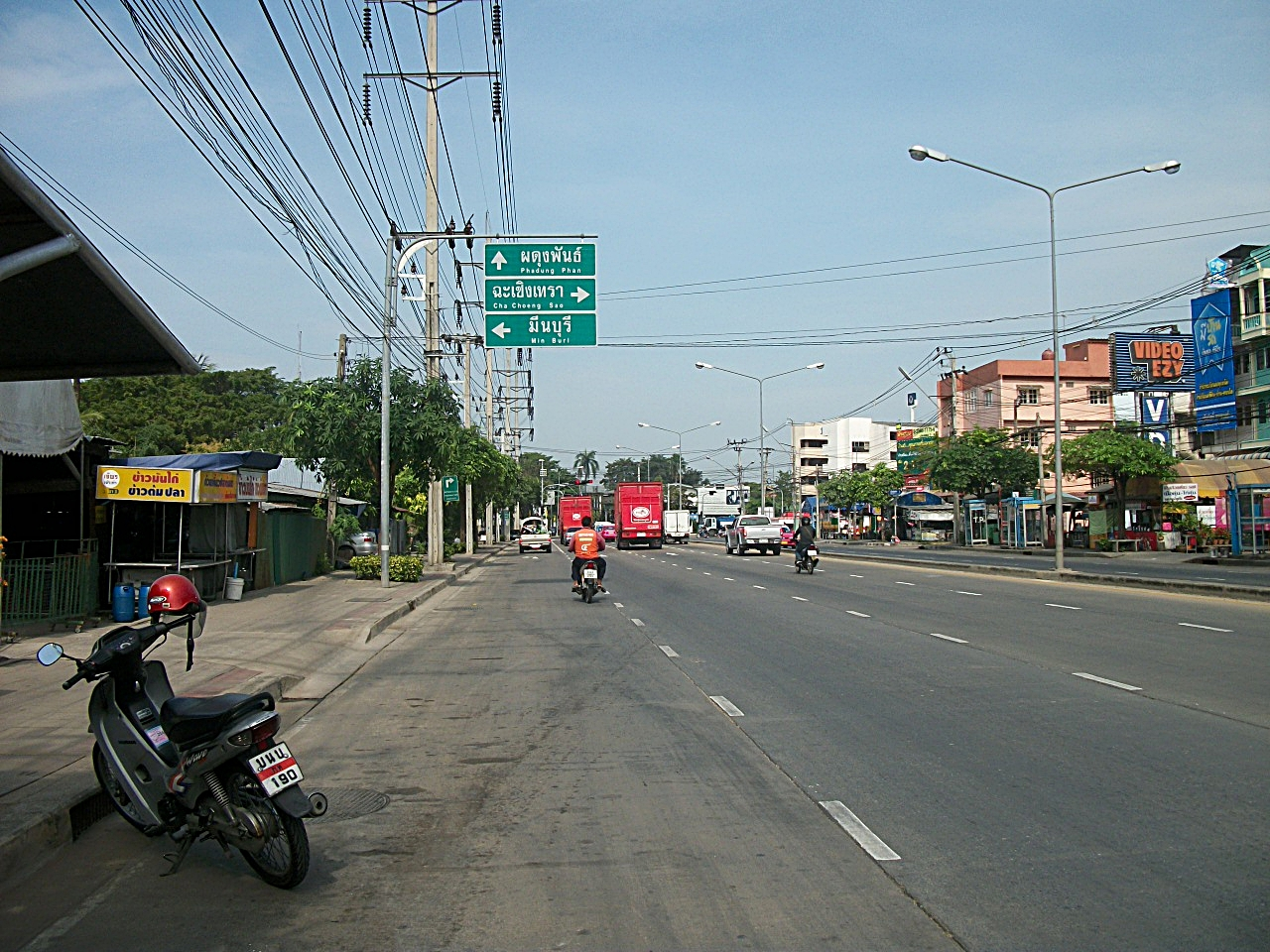
- Nong Chok Intersection, where Liap Wari meets Chueam Samphan and Sangkha Santi Suk Roads

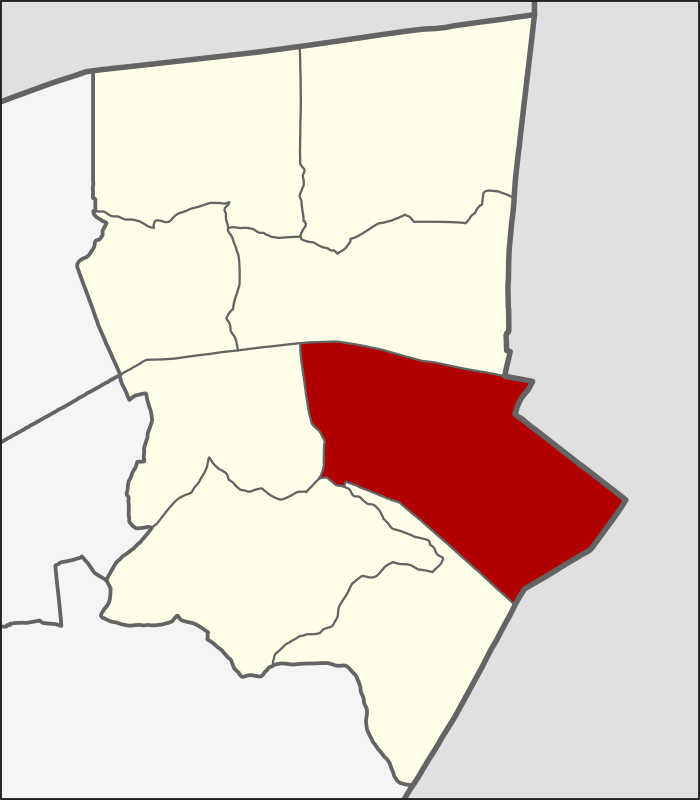
- Location in Nong Chok District
- Country: Thailand
- Province: Bangkok
- Khet: Nong Chok

Area
  - Total: 38.132 km^{2} (14.723 sq mi)

Population (2020)
  - Total: 40,146
- Time zone: UTC+7 (ICT)
- Postal code: 10530
- TIS 1099: 100301

Krathum Rai (Thai: กระทุ่มราย, pronounced [krā.tʰûm rāːj]) is a khwaeng (subdistrict) of Nong Chok District, in Bangkok, Thailand. In 2020, it had a total population of 40,146 people.

Its name Krathum Rai literally meaning "surrounded by burflower-trees" (Krathum in Thai). The area is considered the centre of the district. Where the important utilities and buildings are located, such as Nong Chok District Office, Wetchakarunrasm Hospital (Nong Chok Hospital), Nong Chok Park, Nong Chok Public Library, etc.

Krathum Rai is served by BMTA bus no. 131 and affiliated bus no. 1-59 (526).
