= Piper PA-31 Navajo =

Family of twin engine aircraft built 1967–1984

PA-31
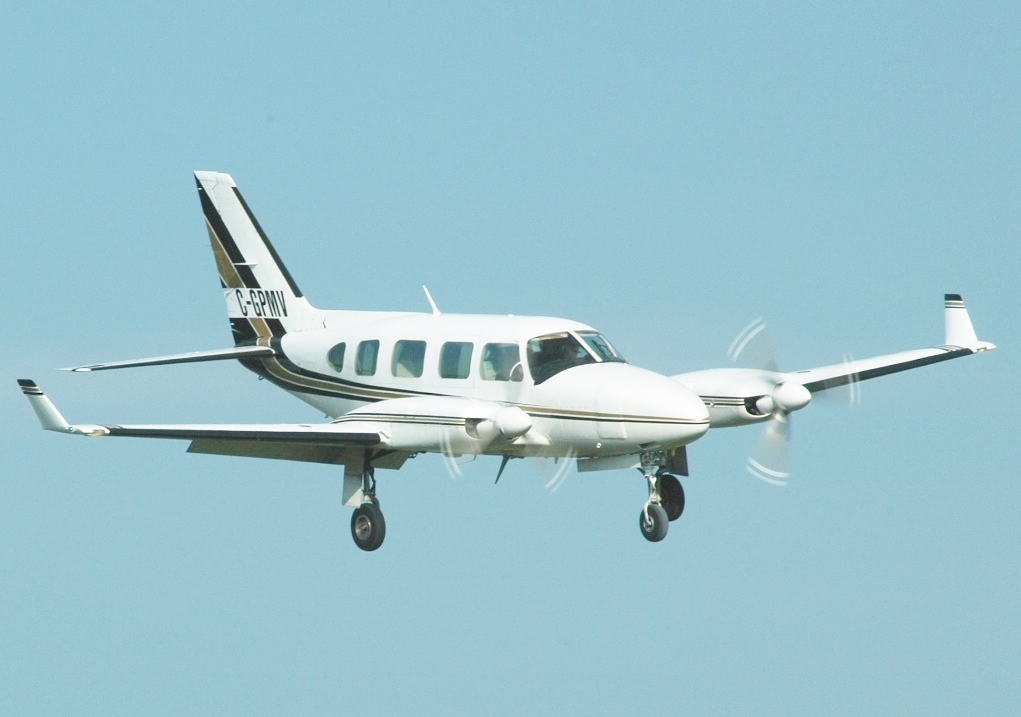
- Piper PA-31 Navajo, with aftermarket winglets installed

General information
- Type: Utility aircraft
- Manufacturer: Piper Aircraft
- Status: Active service
- Number built: 3,942

History
- Manufactured: 1967–1984
- Introduction date: 30 March 1967
- First flight: 30 September 1964
- Developed into: Piper PA-31T Cheyenne

The Piper PA-31 Navajo is a family of twin-engined low-wing tricycle gear utility aircraft designed and built by Piper Aircraft for small cargo and feeder airlines, and as a corporate aircraft. Production ran from 1967 to 1984. It was license-built in a number of Latin American countries.

== Development ==
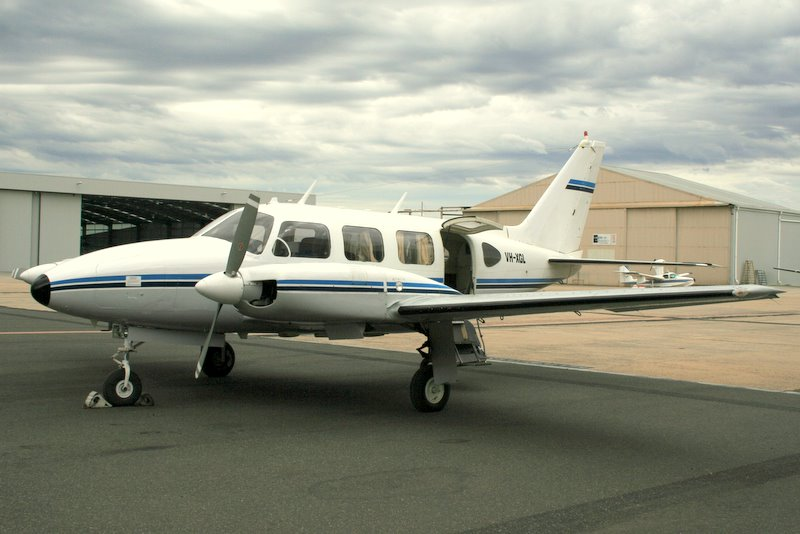
Early Navajo with two-bladed propellers and two-part entry door

In 1962, Piper began developing a six- to eight-seat twin-engined corporate and commuter transport aircraft under the project name Inca, at the request of company founder William T. Piper. Looking like a scaled-up PA-30 Twin Comanche, the PA-31 made its first flight on 30 September 1964, and was announced later that year. It is a low-wing monoplane with a conventional tail, powered by two 310 hp (231 kW) Lycoming TIO-540-A turbocharged engines in "tiger shark" cowlings, a feature shared with the Twin Comanche and the PA-23 Aztec.

As testing proceeded, two cabin windows were added to each fuselage side and the engines were moved further forward. The PA-31, named "Navajo" after the native American tribe, was certified by the FAA on 24 February 1966, again in mid-1966 with an increase in maximum takeoff weight (MTOW) from 6,200 to 6,500 lb (2,812 to 2,948 kg), and deliveries began in 1967.

The PA-31-300 was certified by the FAA in June 1967, the only variant without turbocharged engines: 300 hp (224 kW) Lycoming IO-540-M1A5 engines driving two-bladed propellers. Unofficially, the initial model was referred to as the PA-31-310. Only 14 PA-31-300 were built in 1968 and 1969: the smallest variant production.

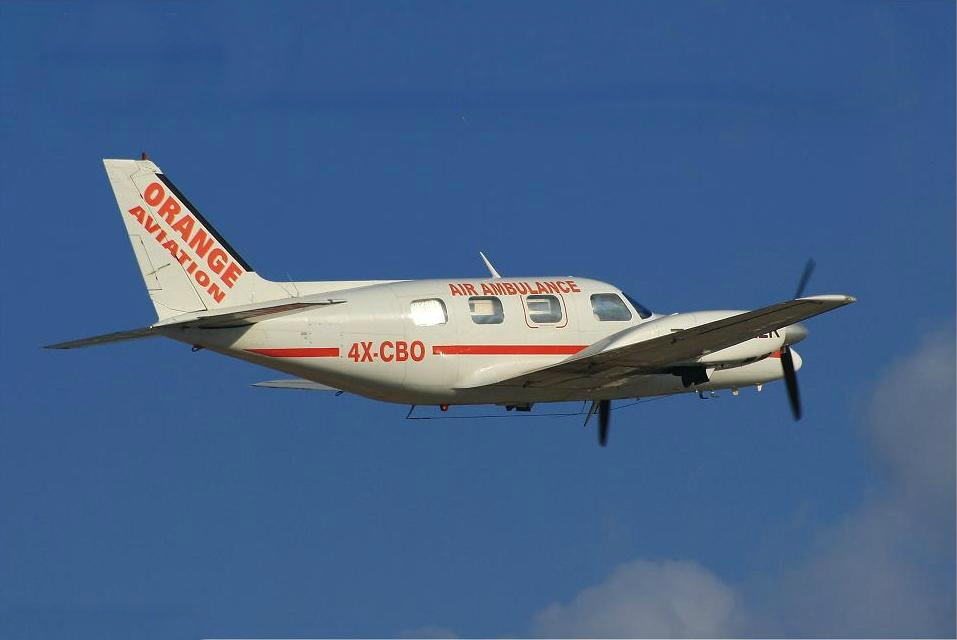
Pressurized PA-31P with fewer and smaller windows

In January 1966, development of the PA-31P Pressurized Navajo had begun : Piper's first pressurized aircraft. The PA-31P (or PA-31P-425 unofficially) was certified in late 1969. It was powered by 425 hp (317 kW) Lycoming TIGO-541-E engines, had a longer nose, fewer and smaller windows, 25 US gal (95 L; 21 imp gal) fuel tanks in the engine nacelles and a one-piece airstair cabin entry door instead of the split pair of doors. MTOW was increased to 7,800 lb (3,538 kg). The PA-31P was produced from 1970 to 1977.

The 1971 Navajo B featured air conditioning, new storage lockers in the rear of the engine nacelles, increased baggage space, a third door next to the cabin doors for easier baggage loading, and an optional separate door for the pilot to enter the cockpit.

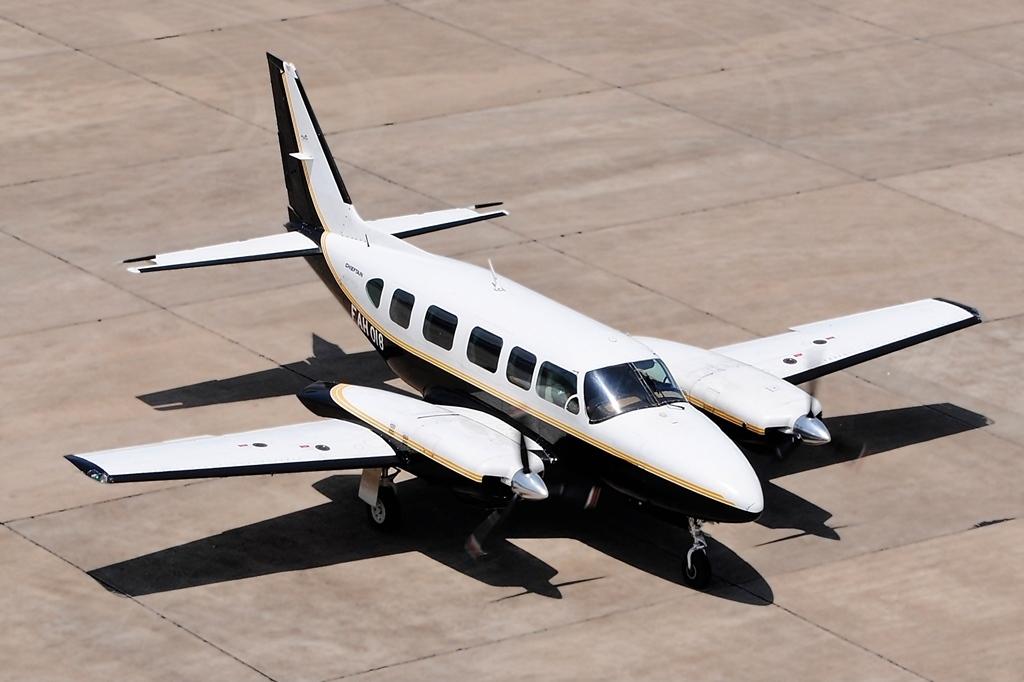
The PA-31-350 Chieftain, stretched by 2 ft (61 cm)

In September 1972, Piper unveiled the PA-31-350 Navajo Chieftain, a Navajo B stretched by 2 ft (61 cm) for up to ten seats, with more powerful engines and counter-rotating propellers to prevent critical engine handling problems. The Chieftain was powered by 350 hp (261 kW) Lycoming TIO-540 variants, with an opposite-rotation LTIO-540 on the right-hand wing, and MTOW was increased to 7,000 lb (3,175 kg). Deliveries started in 1973, after a delay due to a flood caused by Hurricane Agnes at Piper's factory in Lock Haven, Pennsylvania.

The 1974 PA-31-325 Navajo C/R was based on the Navajo B. The Navajo C/R had 325 hp (242 kW), lower rated versions of the Chieftain's counter-rotating engines. It was certified in May 1974, and production commenced in the 1975 model year. The Navajo B was also superseded in 1975 by the Navajo C.

In May 1981, Piper established its T1000 Airliner Division at its Lakeland, Florida, factory. The PA-31-350T1020 (or T1020) was a PA-31-350 Chieftain optimized for and marketed for the commuter airline market, without the 40 US gal (151 L; 33 imp gal) auxiliary fuel tanks in each wing. Up to eleven seats could be fitted, and baggage capacity was reduced from 700 to 600 lb (318 to 272 kg) maximum. The first T1020 was delivered in December 1981.

The PA-31T3 (T1040) was a hybrid with the PA-31-350T1020 main fuselage, and the nose and tail of the PA-31T1 Cheyenne I. The wings were similar to the Cheyenne I's, but with reduced fuel capacity and baggage lockers in the engine nacelles similar to those of the Chieftain. An optional underbelly cargo pod was also available. The Pratt & Whitney Canada PT6A-11 turboprop engines were the same as those of the Cheyenne I. Deliveries began in July 1982. A T1050 variant was proposed, with a fuselage stretch of 11 ft 6 in (3.51 m) and seating capacity for 17, but did not proceed.

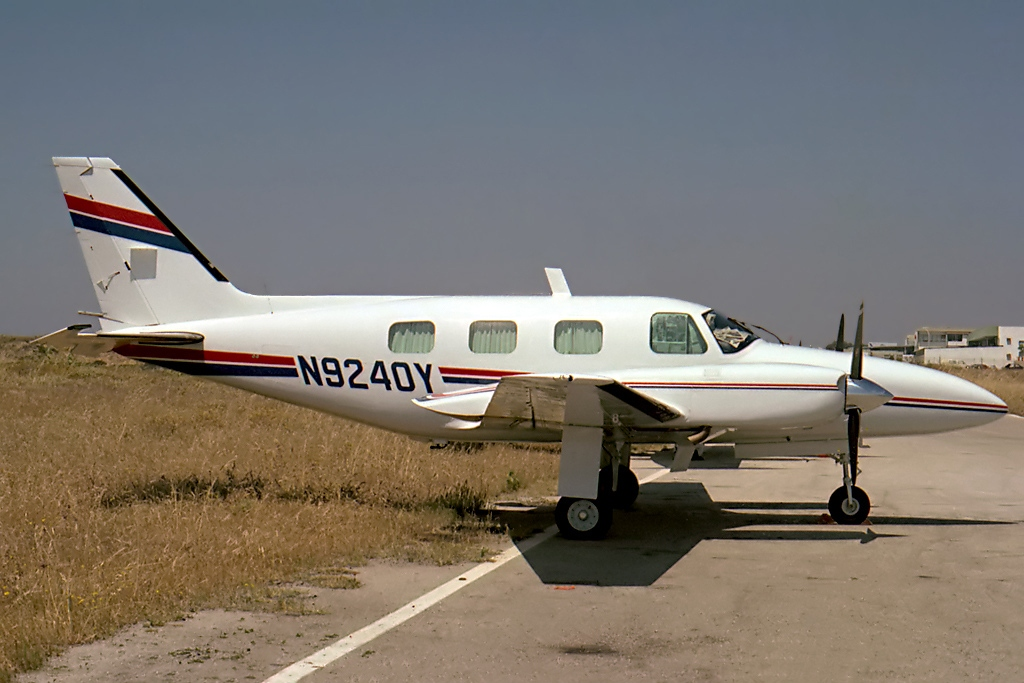
Pressurized PA-31P-350 Mojave

The PA-31P-350 Mojave was also a hybrid, a piston-engined Cheyenne. The Mojave combined the Cheyenne I fuselage with the Chieftain tail. The Chieftain's wings were strengthened, their span was 4 ft (1.2 m) wider and the fuel capacity was enlarged to 243 US gal (920 L; 202 imp gal). The engines variants had intercoolers, and the rear part of the nacelles were baggage lockers. The Mojave's MTOW rose by 200 lb (91 kg) to 7,200 lb (3,266 kg). Certified in 1983, like the T1020 and T1040, the Mojave was produced in 1983 and 1984; combined production with the T1020 and T1040 was below 100 aircraft. Two experimental PA-31-353s were also built in the mid-1980s.

=== Licensed manufacture ===
The PA-31 series was manufactured under licence in several countries from kits of parts supplied by Piper. Chincul SACAIFI in Argentina assembled most of the series as the PA-A-31, PA-A-31-325, PA-A-31P and PA-A-31-350 and Aero Industrial Colombiana SA (AICSA) in Colombia assembled PA-31, PA-31-325 and PA-31-350 aircraft. The PA-31-350 Chieftain was also assembled under licence in Brazil by Embraer as the EMB 820C Navajo. In 1984, Embraer subsidiary company Indústria Aeronáutica Neiva began converting Embraer EMB 820Cs by installing Pratt & Whitney Canada PT6 turboprop engines; Neiva called the converted aircraft the Carajá.

== Variants ==
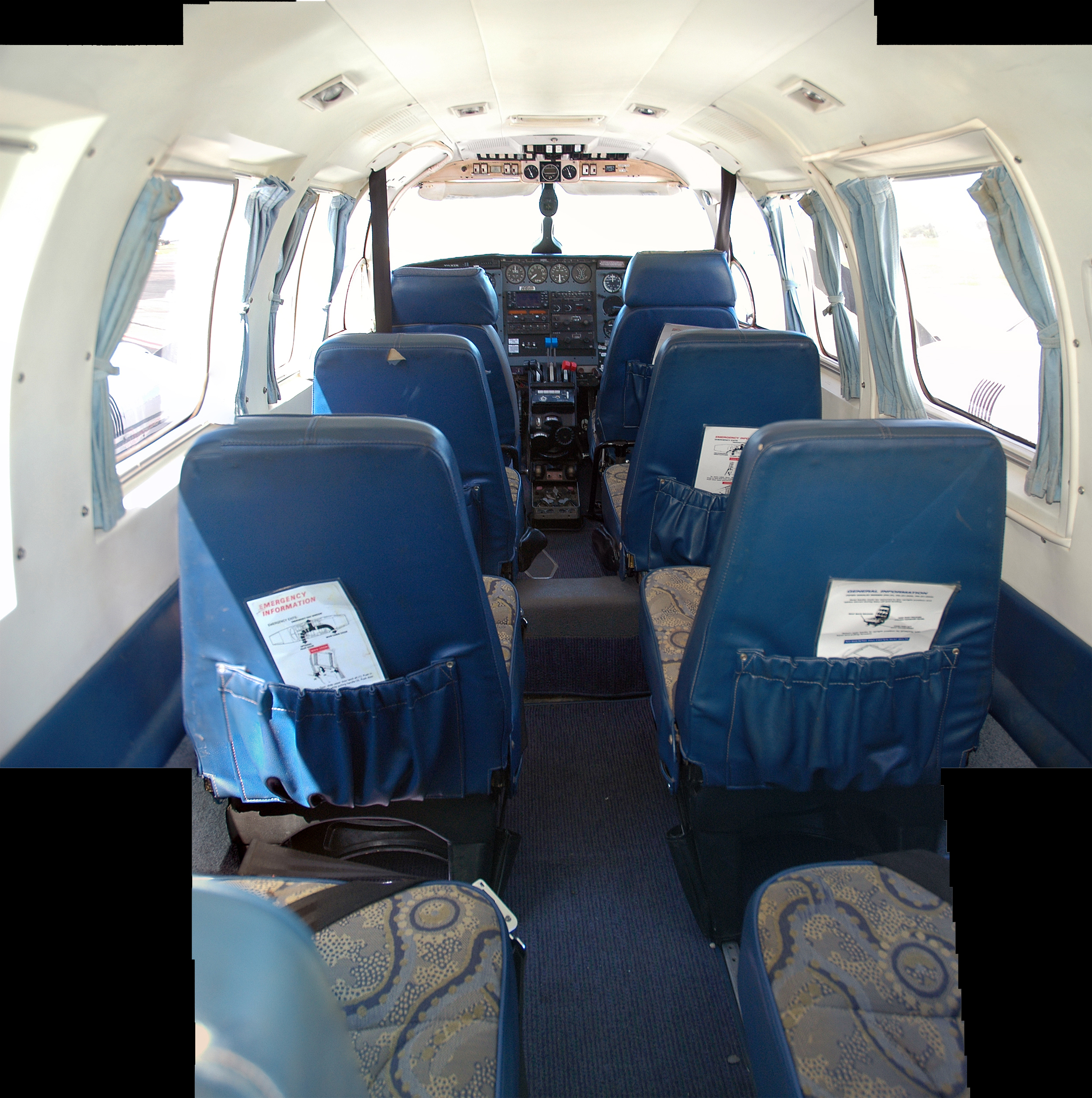
Commuter cabin

PA-31 Navajo
Initial production version, also known unofficially as the PA-31-310.
PA-31-300 Navajo
Variant of the Navajo with normally aspirated engines; 14 built.
PA-31 Navajo B
Marketing name for 1971 improved variant with 310 hp (231 kW) Lycoming TIO-540-E turbo-charged piston engines, new airconditioning and optional pilot access door and optional wide utility door.
PA-31 Navajo C
Marketing name for 1974 improved variant with 310 hp (231 kW) Lycoming TIO-540-A2C engines and other minor improvements.
PA-31P Pressurized Navajo
Pressurized version of the PA-31 Navajo, powered by two 425-hp (317-kW) Lycoming TIGO-541-E1A piston engines.
PA-31-325 Navajo
Referred to as the "Navajo C/R" for Counter-rotating; variant of Navajo with counter-rotating engines introduced with the PA-31-350 Chieftain. 325 hp (242 kW) Lycoming TIO-540 / LTIO-540 engines
PA-31-350 Chieftain
Stretched version of the Navajo with more powerful 350-hp (261-kW) counter-rotating engines (a Lycoming TIO-540 and a Lycoming LTIO-540) to eliminate critical engine issues.
PA-31P-350 Mojave
Piston-engined variant of the PA-31T1 Cheyenne I; 50 aircraft built.
PA-31-350T1020
Also known as the T1020/T-1020; variant of the PA-31-350 Chieftain optimised for commuter airline use, with less baggage and fuel capacity and increased seating capacity (nine passengers). First flight September 25, 1981. 21 built.
PA-31T3
Also known as the T1040/T-1040; turboprop-powered airliner with fuselage of the PA-31-350T1020, and wings, tail and Pratt & Whitney Canada PT6A-11 engines of PA-31T Cheyenne. First flight July 17, 1981. 24 built.
PA-31-353
Experimental version of PA-31-350; two built.

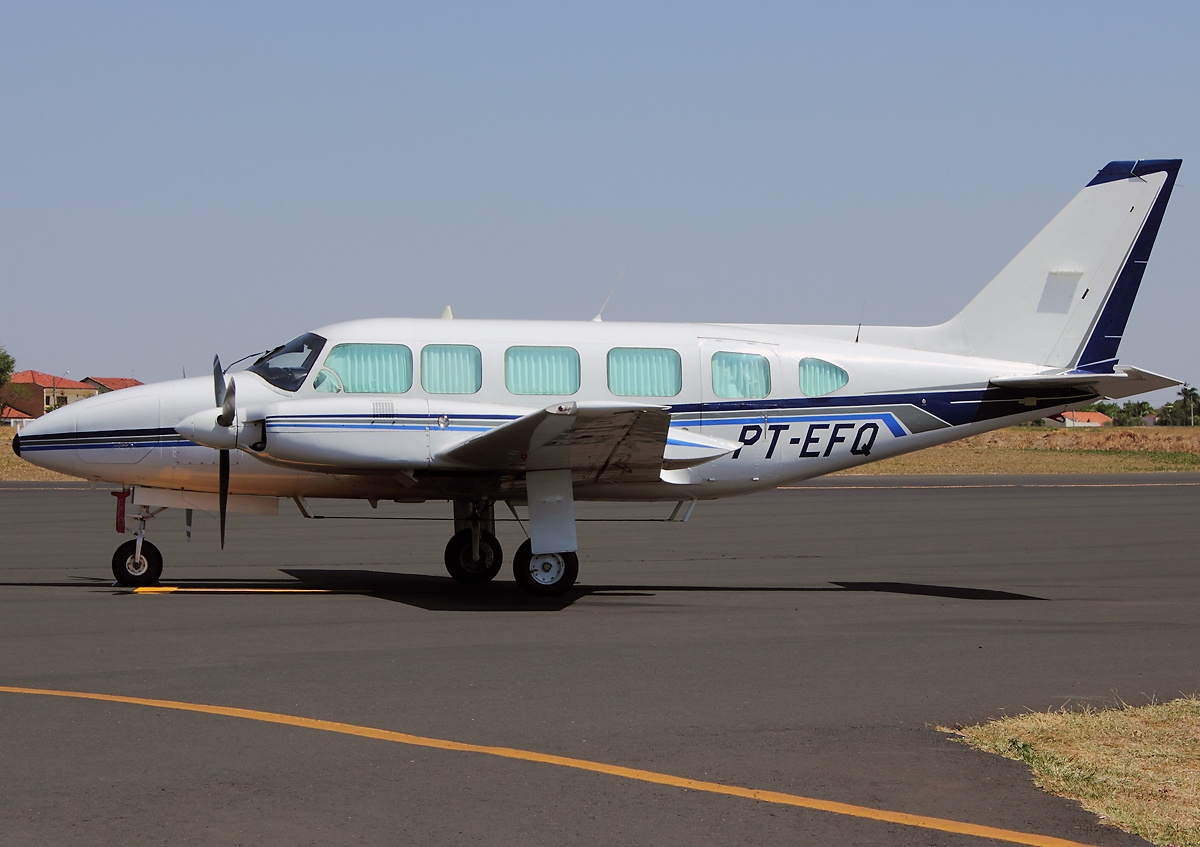
License-built EMB 820C

T1050
Unbuilt airliner variant with fuselage lengthened by 11 ft 6 in (3.51 m) compared to the PA-31-350.
EMB 820C
Version of Chieftain built under license by Embraer in Brazil.
Neiva Carajá
Turboprop conversion of EMB 820C, fitted with two Pratt & Whitney Canada PT6A-27 engines flat-rated to 550shp. The Carajá's MTOW of 8,003 pounds (3,630 kg) was 1,000 pounds (454 kg) more than that of the Chieftain.

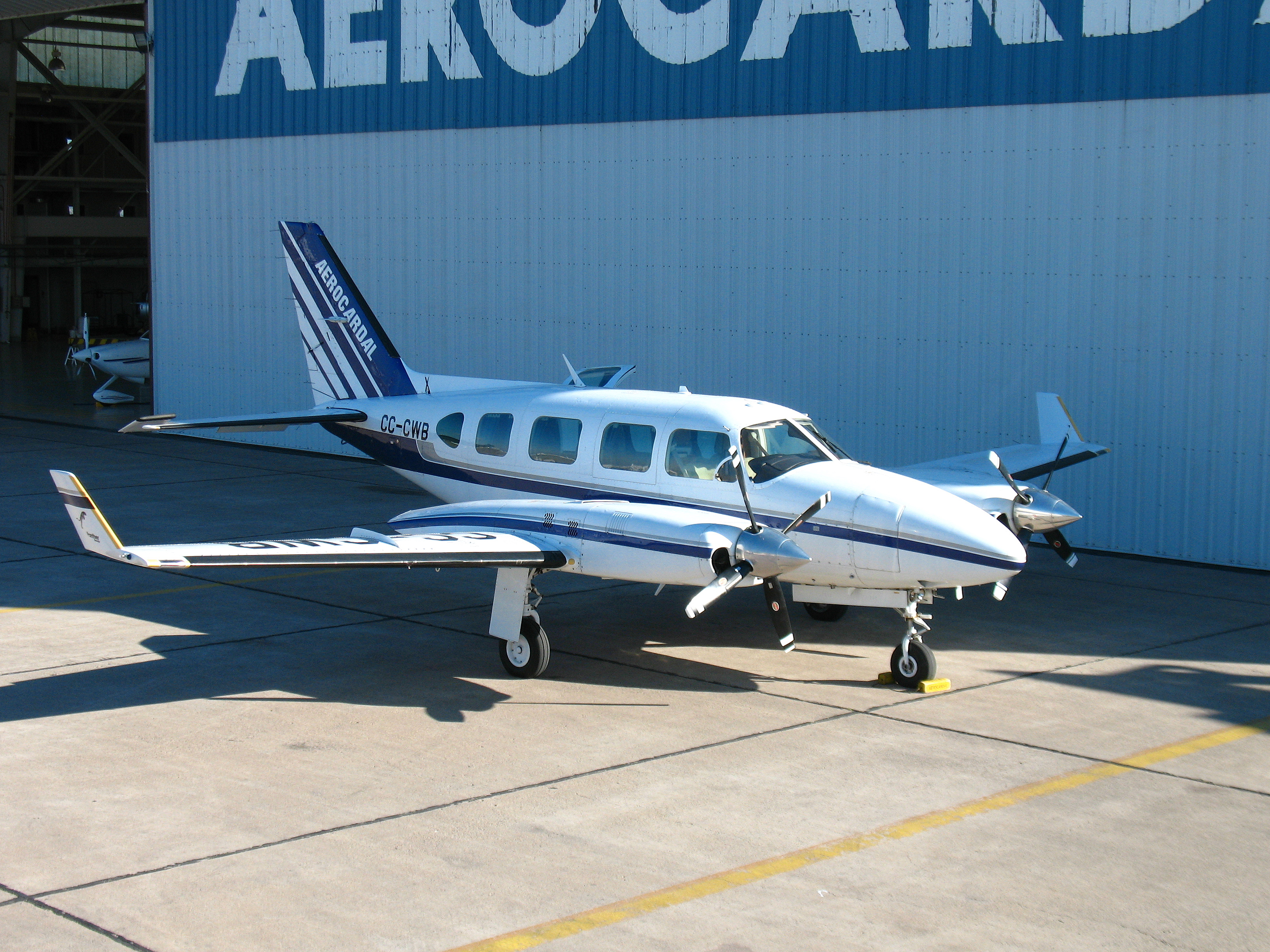
Panther conversion with four-blade propellers

Colemill Panther
Re-engined Navajo with 350 hp (261 kW) Lycoming TIO-540-J2B engines, four-blade Hartzell "Q-Tip" propellers and optional winglets. Conversion designed by Colemill Enterprises of Nashville, Tennessee. The supplemental type certificates (STCs) were subsequently sold to Mike Jones Aircraft Sales, which continues to convert PA-31, PA-31-325 and PA-31-350 variants with Colemill-developed features.

Number built
Type	Built	Location
PA-31	1785	Lock Haven; Lakeland
PA-31-350	1825	Lock Haven; Lakeland
T-1020	21	Lakeland
PA-31-353	2	Lakeland
PA-31P	259	Lock Haven
PA-31P-350	50	Lock Haven
Total	3942	

== Operators ==
=== Civil ===
Philippines

- Philippine Coast Guard: 1 Unit of PA-31-325 serial PCG-221 entered service August 2025.

Portugal

- Sevenair Air Services

United Kingdom

- HM Coastguard (2Excel Aviation)

The Navajo family is popular with air charter companies, small feeder airlines and commuter air carriers in many countries, and is also operated by private individuals and companies.

The PA-31 Navajo was also formerly operated in scheduled passenger airline service in the U.S. in 1968 by Air West, the predecessor of Hughes Airwest which in turn subsequently became an all-jet airline. West Coast Airlines, the predecessor of Air West, began operating the PA-31 Navajo in passenger service in 1967 and called the aircraft the "MiniLiner". West Coast, which was also operating Douglas DC-9-10 jets and Fairchild F-27 turboprops at the time, claimed to be the first "regular airline" to operate the PA-31 Navajo in scheduled service.

=== Military ===
Antigua and Barbuda

- Antigua and Barbuda Defence Force Air Wing operates (2023) one PA-31 with one more "unserviceable" aircraft in store.

Chile

- Chilean Navy purchased a single PA-31 in 1971.

Colombia

- Colombian Air Force
- Colombian Navy

Dominican Republic

- Dominican Republic Air Force operates two PA-31s as of December 2018.

Finland

- Finnish Air Force operated the PA-31-350 Chieftain in the liaison and light transport role.

France

- French Navy former operator

Honduras

- Honduran Air Force operates one PA-31 as of December 2018.

Kenya

- Kenya Air Force operated a Navajo Chieftain in the VIP role.

Spain

- Spanish Air Force

United Kingdom

- Aeroplane and Armament Experimental Establishment former operator

== Accidents and incidents ==
- July 13, 1972: An Ansett Australia Piper PA-31 Navajo aircraft, registered as VH-CIZ, crashed near Golden Grove shortly after departing Adelaide for a charter flight to Moomba Airport. All eight people on board, including the pilot and seven passengers, were killed.
- December 18, 1979: A Piper PA-31 Navajo light plane working a courier service crashed at Halifax airport, killing two and destroying many documents detailing transactions from 59 banks in Prince Edward Island and Cape Breton.
- December 3, 1983: SouthCentral Air Flight 59, a PA-31-350 registered N35206, carrying eight passengers and one pilot, was on the takeoff roll at Anchorage International Airport when it collided head-on with Korean Air Lines Flight 084, a McDonnell Douglas DC-10-30 freighter HL7339. The Piper struck the DC-10's left and center main landing gear and three passengers sustained minor injuries; the DC-10 overran the runway and the three crew suffered serious injuries. Investigators determined that the Korean Air Lines pilot had become disoriented taxiing in fog, failed to follow correct procedures and confirm his position, and accidentally initiated takeoff from the wrong runway. Both aircraft were severely damaged and were written off.
- October 14, 1984: Wapiti Aviation Flight 402 collided with terrain while landing at High Prairie Airport killing six of the 10 occupants onboard including Canadian politician Grant Notley.
- January 11, 1987: An Eagle Air Piper Chieftain with registration TF-ORN, crashed in the ocean outside of Skutulsfjörður while on approach to Ísafjörður Airport, in bad weather, killing the pilot.
- April 27, 1994: A Piper PA-31-350 Navajo Chieftain, registration N990RA, operated by Action Air Charters, overshot the 6-24 runway at Sikorsky Memorial Airport, Stratford, Connecticut, and struck a fence, killing eight of the nine aboard.
- October 8, 1998: A Castle Aviation owned and operated Piper Chieftain (N3453A) was flying from Detroit Metropolitan Airport to Portage County Airport when it was destroyed after a forced landing in a wooded area near Ravenna, Ohio, approximately 5 miles from the destination airport due to fuel starvation. The airplane had been suffering issues with the landing gear status lights during the trip which caused a circuit breaker to open. The pilot flew four more legs with the airplane in this condition, not realizing the fuel gauges were also disabled by that circuit breaker.
- May 31, 2000: Whyalla Airlines Flight 904 was a scheduled commuter flight, operated by a Piper PA-31 Navajo which crashed while attempting to ditch in the Spencer Gulf, South Australia after suffering failures of both engines on the evening of 31 May 2000. All 8 people on board the aircraft were killed as a result of the accident. The findings of a subsequent investigation by the Australian Transport Safety Bureau highlighting the airline's operating procedures as a key factor leading to the accident were later overturned after they were contradicted by evidence presented at a coronial inquiry into the deaths of those on board the flight. The accident led to a recall by engine manufacturer Textron Lycoming which saw close to 1000 aircraft grounded worldwide while defects were rectified at an estimated cost of $A66 million. Australia's aviation regulator, the Civil Aviation Safety Authority also mandated life jackets be carried on all aircraft operating over water after the crash.
- 6 June 2003: An Air Adventures New Zealand Ltd Piper PA-31 Chieftain (registered ZK-NCA) crashed into trees and terrain 1.2 nmi (2.2 km; 1.4 mi) short of runway 20, killing the pilot and seven of the nine passengers on board. The aircraft was flying too low during an ILS approach in foggy weather.
- July 9, 2009: At approximately 10:08 pm, a Piper PA-31 Navajo airplane originating from Victoria crashed into an industrial area in Richmond, British Columbia. The two pilots were killed. It was owned and operated by Canadian Air Charters and was carrying units of blood for Canadian Blood Services at the time. Officials say that wake turbulence was the main cause of the crash. Fatigue, along with diminished depth perception in darkness, was also a factor.
- March 15, 2013: Three people were killed when a Piper PA-31 Navajo aircraft crashed shortly after takeoff into a parking lot of a business near the departure end of the runway 9. All three occupants of the aircraft were killed, and the cause of the crash was listed as pilot error.
- August 1, 2016: Thai Regional Airline Flight 106, a Piper PA-31 Navajo (HS-FGB) arriving from Nakhon Ratchasima Airport with two passengers, crashed at Lam Phak Chi, Nong Chok district, Bangkok. In the incident, there was one fatality (the captain in command) and four injuries.
- February 13, 2023: A Piper PA-31 Navajo aircraft owned by Murowa (Private) Limited force-landed near Beatrice. The aircraft was transporting diamonds under armed guard from the Murowa mine to Harare when it developed an apparent engine fault. Five people were injured in the crash, including the pilot and security personnel. The diamond consignment was secured following the incident.
- July 26, 2025: A Piper PA-31-310 Navajo C registered C-GYYP, operated by Kîsik Aerial Survey crashed approximately three minutes after takeoff from Deer Lake Regional Airport, the pilot who was the sole occupant onboard was killed.
- January 10, 2026: A Piper PA-31-310 (N325FA) crashed after takeoff from Juan José Rondón Airport in Paipa, Colombia, the pilot and five passengers, including Colombian singer Yeison Jiménez, were killed.

== Aircraft on display ==
Spain

- A PA-31P Pressurized Navajo formerly operated by the Spanish Air Force is on display at the Museo del Aire in Madrid.

== Specifications (PA-31 Navajo) ==
PA-31-350 Navajo Chieftain

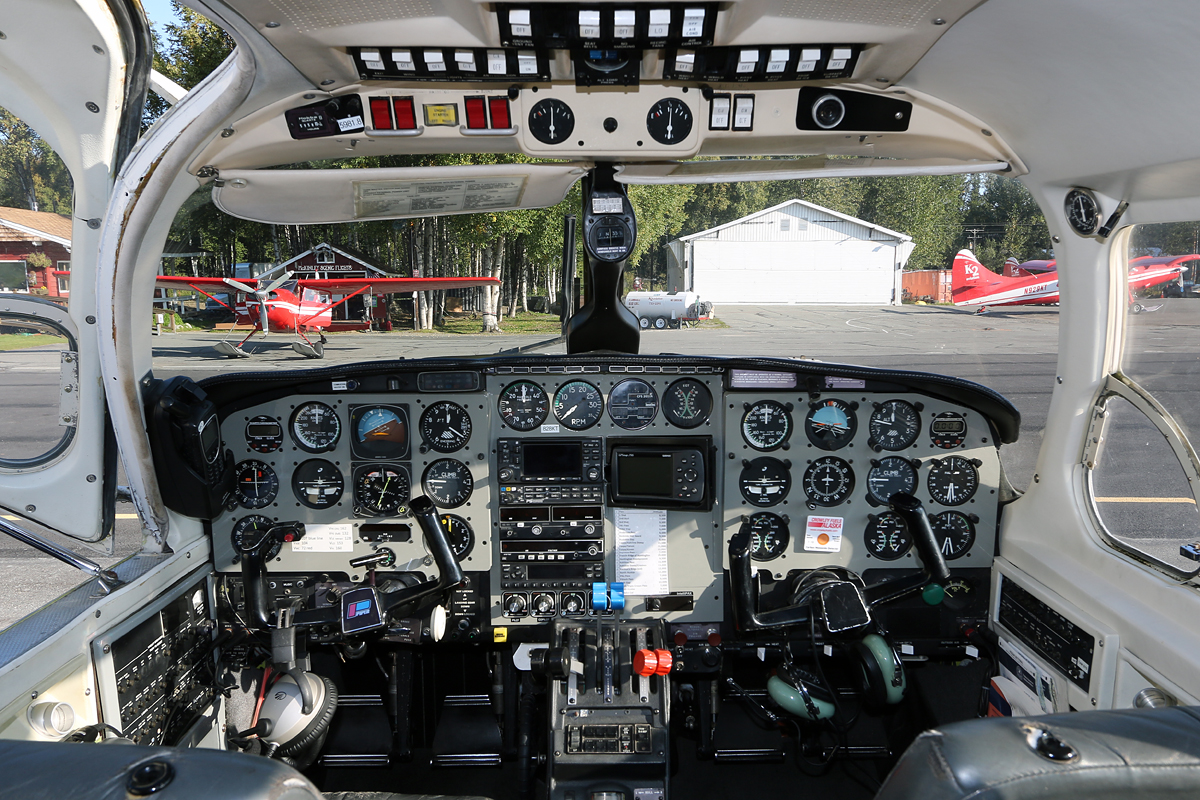
cockpit

Data from Jane's All The World's Aircraft 1976–77

General characteristics

- Crew: 1 or 2
- Capacity: 5 to 7 passengers
- Length: 32 ft 7 1/2 in (9.94 m)
- Wingspan: 40 ft 8 in (12.40 m)
- Height: 13 ft 0 in (3.96 m)
- Wing area: 229 sq ft (21.3 m^{2})
- Airfoil: NACA 63_{4}415 at root, 63_{1}212
- Empty weight: 3,930 lb (1,783 kg)
- Max takeoff weight: 6,500 lb (2,948 kg)
- Fuel capacity: 190 US gal (160 imp gal; 720 L) total, 187 US gal (156 imp gal; 710 L) useable
- Powerplant: 2 × Lycoming TIO-540-A air-cooled six-cylinder horizontally opposed piston engine, 310 hp (230 kW) each
- Propellers: 3-bladed Hartzell metal, fully feathering propellers, 6 ft 8 in (2.03 m) diameter

Performance

- Maximum speed: 261 mph (420 km/h, 227 kn) at 15,000 ft (4,600 m)
- Cruise speed: 238 mph (383 km/h, 207 kn) at 20,000 ft (6,100 m) (econ. cruise)
- Stall speed: 73 mph (117 km/h, 63 kn) (flaps down)
- Never exceed speed: 272 mph (438 km/h, 236 kn)
- Range: 1,165 mi (1,875 km, 1,012 nmi) at 20,000 ft (6,100 m) (econ. cruise speed)
- Service ceiling: 26,300 ft (8,000 m)
- Rate of climb: 1,445 ft/min (7.34 m/s)

== See also ==
Related development

- Piper PA-31T Cheyenne

Aircraft of comparable role, configuration, and era

- Beechcraft Queen Air
- Cessna 402
- Cessna 414
- Aero Commander 500
