= Khlong Sip subdistrict =

Khlong Sip คลองสิบ
- Khwaeng
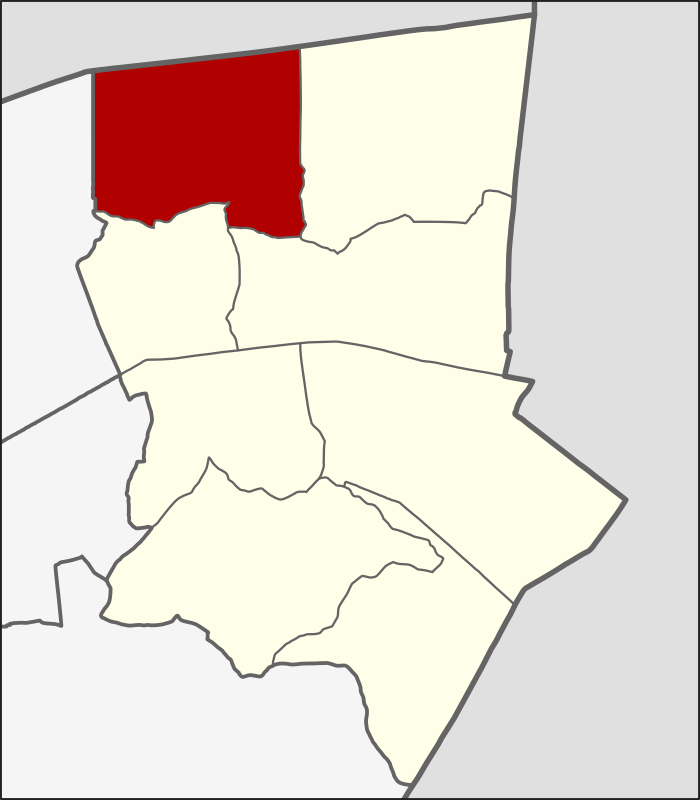
- Location in Nong Chok District
- Country: Thailand
- Province: Bangkok
- Khet: Nong Chok

Area
  - Total: 30.849 km^{2} (11.911 sq mi)

Population (2020)
  - Total: 9,186
- Time zone: UTC+7 (ICT)
- Postal code: 10530
- TIS 1099: 100303

Khlong Sip (Thai: คลองสิบ, pronounced [kʰlɔ̄ːŋ sìp]) is a khwaeng (subdistrict) of Nong Chok District, in Bangkok, Thailand. In 2020, it had a total population of 9,186 people.
