= Triam Udom Suksa Pattanakarn School =

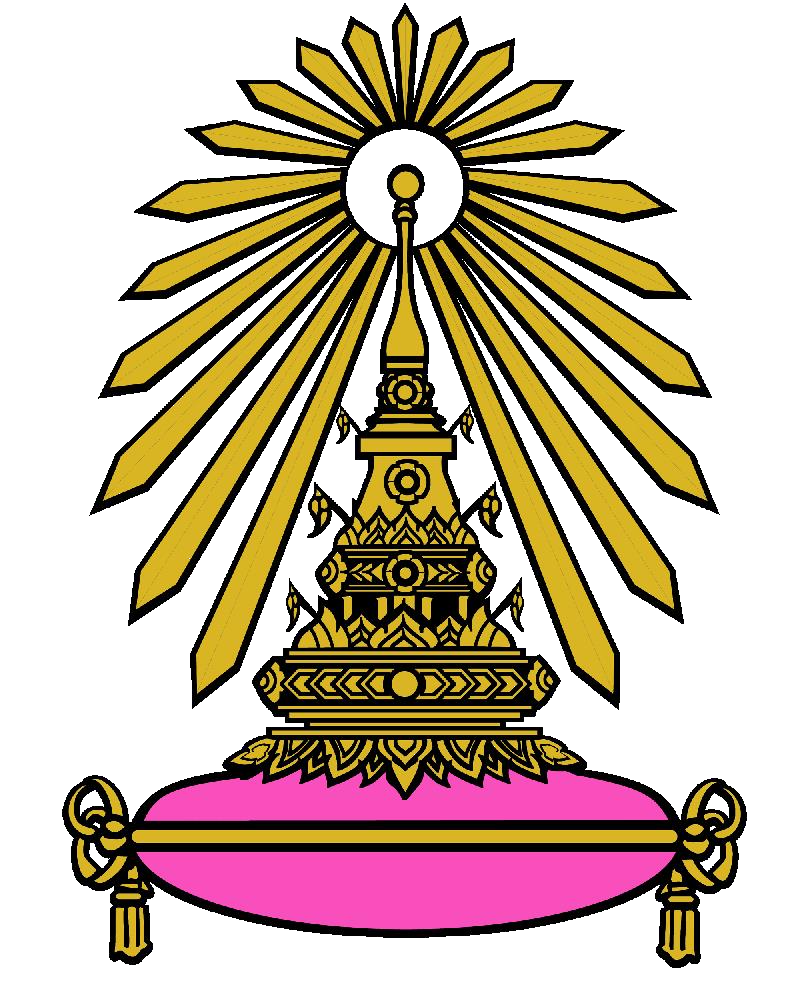

Location
- 499 Pattanakarn Rd., Suan Luang; Bangkok, 10250; Thailand
- Coordinates: 13°43′45″N 100°38′51″E

Information
- Type: Public School
- Motto: Integrity and Wisdom Lead to Prosperity
- Established: 21 February 1978
- Founder: Lady Boonluen Krue-Trachoo
- School board: The Secondary Educational Service Area Office 2
- Authority: Office of the Basic Education Commission (OBEC)
- Director: Jintana Srisarakham
- Grades: 7–12 (mathayom 1–6)
- Enrollment: ~ 4000
- Classes: 102
- Language: Thai English Japanese Chinese French German
- Campus type: Urban
- Colours: Pink & Blue
- Slogan: “Academic and Ethical Excellence”
- Song: Triampat’s March
- Nickname: Triampat
- Website: www.tup.ac.th

Triam Udom Suksa Pattanakarn School (Thai: โรงเรียนเตรียมอุดมศึกษาพัฒนาการ, commonly abbreviated as Triampat, is a high school located in Bangkok, Thailand. It admits lower-secondary and upper-secondary students (mathayom 1–6, equivalent to grades 7–12). Founded in 1978 as a campus school of Triam Udom Suksa School, Bangkok, Thailand which is preparatory school for Chulalongkorn University. Triam Udom Suksa Pattanakarn School has among the top 3 highest university entry rates for Thai high-schools, and its students consistently score among the top in national standardized tests.
