= Khwaeng =

Administrative subdivision in Thai cities

Map showing the subdistricts of Bangkok

A khwaeng (Thai: แขวง, pronounced [kʰwɛ̌ːŋ]) is an administrative subdivision used in the fifty districts of Bangkok and a few other city municipalities in Thailand. Currently, there are 180 khwaeng in Bangkok. A khwaeng is roughly equivalent to a tambon in other provinces of Thailand, smaller than an amphoe (district). With the creation of the special administrative area of Bangkok in 1972, the tambon within the area of the new administrative entity was converted into khwaeng. The common English translation for khwaeng is subdistrict.

Historically, in some regions of the country khwaeng referred to subdivisions of a province (then known as mueang, predating the modern term changwat), while in others they were called amphoe. Administrative reforms at the beginning of the 20th century standardized them to the term amphoe.

== Khwaeng of Bangkok ==
District (khet)			Subdistrict (khwaeng)			Notes
Code	Name	Name (Thai)	Code	Name	Name (Thai)	Notes
01	Phra Nakhon	พระนคร	01	Phra Borom Maha Ratchawang	พระบรมมหาราชวัง	
01	Phra Nakhon	พระนคร	02	Wang Burapha Phirom	วังบูรพาภิรมย์	
01	Phra Nakhon	พระนคร	03	Wat Ratchabophit	วัดราชบพิธ	
01	Phra Nakhon	พระนคร	04	Samran Rat	สำราญราษฎร์	
01	Phra Nakhon	พระนคร	05	San Chaopho Suea	ศาลเจ้าพ่อเสือ	
01	Phra Nakhon	พระนคร	06	Sao Chingcha	เสาชิงช้า	Seat of BMA office
01	Phra Nakhon	พระนคร	07	Bowon Niwet	บวรนิเวศ	
01	Phra Nakhon	พระนคร	08	Talat Yot	ตลาดยอด	
01	Phra Nakhon	พระนคร	09	Chana Songkhram	ชนะสงคราม	
01	Phra Nakhon	พระนคร	10	Ban Phan Thom	บ้านพานถม	
01	Phra Nakhon	พระนคร	11	Bang Khun Phrom	บางขุนพรหม	
01	Phra Nakhon	พระนคร	12	Wat Sam Phraya	วัดสามพระยา	District seat
02	Dusit	ดุสิต	01	Dusit	ดุสิต	District seat
02	Dusit	ดุสิต	02	Wachiraphayaban	วชิรพยาบาล	
02	Dusit	ดุสิต	03	Suan Chitlada	สวนจิตรลดา	
02	Dusit	ดุสิต	04	Si Yaek Maha Nak	สี่แยกมหานาค	
02	Dusit	ดุสิต	06	Thanon Nakhon Chai Si	ถนนนครไชยศรี	
03	Nong Chok	หนองจอก	01	Krathum Rai	กระทุ่มราย	District seat
03	Nong Chok	หนองจอก	02	Nong Chok	หนองจอก	
03	Nong Chok	หนองจอก	03	Khlong Sip	คลองสิบ	
03	Nong Chok	หนองจอก	04	Khlong Sip Song	คลองสิบสอง	
03	Nong Chok	หนองจอก	05	Khok Faet	โคกแฝด	
03	Nong Chok	หนองจอก	06	Khu Fang Nuea	คู้ฝั่งเหนือ	
03	Nong Chok	หนองจอก	07	Lam Phak Chi	ลำผักชี	
03	Nong Chok	หนองจอก	08	Lam Toiting	ลำต้อยติ่ง	
04	Bang Rak	บางรัก	01	Maha Phruettharam	มหาพฤฒาราม	
04	Bang Rak	บางรัก	02	Si Lom	สีลม	
04	Bang Rak	บางรัก	03	Suriyawong	สุริยวงศ์	
04	Bang Rak	บางรัก	04	Bang Rak	บางรัก	
04	Bang Rak	บางรัก	05	Si Phraya	สี่พระยา	District seat
05	Bang Khen	บางเขน	02	Anusawari	อนุสาวรีย์	District seat
05	Bang Khen	บางเขน	08	Tha Raeng	ท่าแร้ง	
06	Bang Kapi	บางกะปิ	01	Khlong Chan	คลองจั่น	District seat
06	Bang Kapi	บางกะปิ	08	Hua Mak	หัวหมาก	
07	Pathum Wan	ปทุมวัน	01	Rong Mueang	รองเมือง	District seat
07	Pathum Wan	ปทุมวัน	02	Wang Mai	วังใหม่	
07	Pathum Wan	ปทุมวัน	03	Pathum Wan	ปทุมวัน	
07	Pathum Wan	ปทุมวัน	04	Lumphini	ลุมพินี	
08	Pom Prap Sattru Phai	ป้อมปราบศัตรูพ่าย	01	Pom Prap	ป้อมปราบ	
08	Pom Prap Sattru Phai	ป้อมปราบศัตรูพ่าย	02	Wat Thep Sirin	วัดเทพศิรินทร์	
08	Pom Prap Sattru Phai	ป้อมปราบศัตรูพ่าย	03	Khlong Maha Nak	คลองมหานาค	
08	Pom Prap Sattru Phai	ป้อมปราบศัตรูพ่าย	04	Ban Bat	บ้านบาตร	
08	Pom Prap Sattru Phai	ป้อมปราบศัตรูพ่าย	05	Wat Sommanat	วัดโสมนัส	District seat
09	Phra Khanong	พระโขนง	05	Bang Chak	บางจาก	
09	Phra Khanong	พระโขนง	10	Phra Khanong Tai	พระโขนงใต้	District seat
10	Min Buri	มีนบุรี	01	Min Buri	มีนบุรี	District seat
10	Min Buri	มีนบุรี	02	Saen Saep	แสนแสบ	
11	Lat Krabang	ลาดกระบัง	01	Lat Krabang	ลาดกระบัง	District seat
11	Lat Krabang	ลาดกระบัง	02	Khlong Song Ton Nun	คลองสองต้นนุ่น	
11	Lat Krabang	ลาดกระบัง	03	Khlong Sam Prawet	คลองสามประเวศ	
11	Lat Krabang	ลาดกระบัง	04	Lam Pla Thio	ลำปลาทิว	
11	Lat Krabang	ลาดกระบัง	05	Thap Yao	ทับยาว	
11	Lat Krabang	ลาดกระบัง	06	Khum Thong	ขุมทอง	
12	Yan Nawa	ยานนาวา	03	Chong Nonsi	ช่องนนทรี	District seat
12	Yan Nawa	ยานนาวา	04	Bang Phongphang	บางโพงพาง	
13	Samphanthawong	สัมพันธวงศ์	01	Chakkrawat	จักรวรรดิ	
13	Samphanthawong	สัมพันธวงศ์	02	Samphanthawong	สัมพันธวงศ์	
13	Samphanthawong	สัมพันธวงศ์	03	Talat Noi	ตลาดน้อย	District seat
14	Phaya Thai	พญาไท	01	Sam Sen Nai	สามเสนใน	
14	Phaya Thai	พญาไท	06	Phaya Thai	พญาไท	District seat
15	Thon Buri	ธนบุรี	01	Wat Kanlaya	วัดกัลยาณ์	
15	Thon Buri	ธนบุรี	02	Hiran Ruchi	หิรัญรูจี	
15	Thon Buri	ธนบุรี	03	Bang Yi Ruea	บางยี่เรือ	District seat
15	Thon Buri	ธนบุรี	04	Bukkhalo	บุคคโล	
15	Thon Buri	ธนบุรี	05	Talat Phlu	ตลาดพลู	
15	Thon Buri	ธนบุรี	06	Dao Khanong	ดาวคะนอง	
15	Thon Buri	ธนบุรี	07	Samre	สำเหร่	
16	Bangkok Yai	บางกอกใหญ่	01	Wat Arun	วัดอรุณ	
16	Bangkok Yai	บางกอกใหญ่	02	Wat Tha Phra	วัดท่าพระ	
17	Huai Khwang	ห้วยขวาง	01	Huai Khwang	ห้วยขวาง	District seat
17	Huai Khwang	ห้วยขวาง	02	Bang Kapi	บางกะปิ	
17	Huai Khwang	ห้วยขวาง	04	Sam Sen Nok	สามเสนนอก	
18	Khlong San	คลองสาน	01	Somdet Chao Phraya	สมเด็จเจ้าพระยา	
18	Khlong San	คลองสาน	02	Khlong San	คลองสาน	District seat
18	Khlong San	คลองสาน	03	Bang Lamphu Lang	บางลำภูล่าง	
18	Khlong San	คลองสาน	04	Khlong Ton Sai	คลองต้นไทร	
19	Taling Chan	ตลิ่งชัน	01	Khlong Chak Phra	คลองชักพระ	District seat
19	Taling Chan	ตลิ่งชัน	02	Taling Chan	ตลิ่งชัน	
19	Taling Chan	ตลิ่งชัน	03	Chimphli	ฉิมพลี	
19	Taling Chan	ตลิ่งชัน	04	Bang Phrom	บางพรม	
19	Taling Chan	ตลิ่งชัน	05	Bang Ramat	บางระมาด	
19	Taling Chan	ตลิ่งชัน	07	Bang Chueak Nang	บางเชือกหนัง	
20	Bangkok Noi	บางกอกน้อย	04	Siri Rat	ศิริราช	
20	Bangkok Noi	บางกอกน้อย	05	Ban Chang Lo	บ้านช่างหล่อ	
20	Bangkok Noi	บางกอกน้อย	06	Bang Khun Non	บางขุนนนท์	District seat
20	Bangkok Noi	บางกอกน้อย	07	Bang Khun Si	บางขุนศรี	
20	Bangkok Noi	บางกอกน้อย	09	Arun Ammarin	อรุณอมรินทร์	
21	Bang Khun Thian	บางขุนเทียน	05	Tha Kham	ท่าข้าม	
21	Bang Khun Thian	บางขุนเทียน	07	Samae Dam	แสมดำ	District seat
22	Phasi Charoen	ภาษีเจริญ	01	Bang Wa	บางหว้า	District seat
22	Phasi Charoen	ภาษีเจริญ	02	Bang Duan	บางด้วน	
22	Phasi Charoen	ภาษีเจริญ	06	Bang Chak	บางจาก	
22	Phasi Charoen	ภาษีเจริญ	07	Bang Waek	บางแวก	
22	Phasi Charoen	ภาษีเจริญ	08	Khlong Khwang	คลองขวาง	
22	Phasi Charoen	ภาษีเจริญ	09	Pak Khlong Phasi Charoen	ปากคลองภาษีเจริญ	
22	Phasi Charoen	ภาษีเจริญ	10	Khuha Sawan	คูหาสวรรค์	
23	Nong Khaem	หนองแขม	02	Nong Khaem	หนองแขม	
23	Nong Khaem	หนองแขม	03	Nong Khang Phlu	หนองค้างพลู	District seat
24	Rat Burana	ราษฎร์บูรณะ	01	Rat Burana	ราษฎร์บูรณะ	District seat
24	Rat Burana	ราษฎร์บูรณะ	02	Bang Pakok	บางปะกอก	
25	Bang Phlat	บางพลัด	01	Bang Phlat	บางพลัด	
25	Bang Phlat	บางพลัด	02	Bang O	บางอ้อ	District seat
25	Bang Phlat	บางพลัด	03	Bang Bamru	บางบำหรุ	
25	Bang Phlat	บางพลัด	04	Bang Yi Khan	บางยี่ขัน	
26	Din Daeng	ดินแดง	01	Din Daeng	ดินแดง	District seat and 2^{nd} BMA office Seat
26	Din Daeng	ดินแดง	02	Ratchadaphisek	รัชดาภิเษก	
27	Bueng Kum	บึงกุ่ม	01	Khlong Kum	คลองกุ่ม	District seat
27	Bueng Kum	บึงกุ่ม	04	Nawamin	นวมินทร์	
27	Bueng Kum	บึงกุ่ม	05	Nuan Chan	นวลจันทร์	
28	Sathon	สาทร	01	Thung Wat Don	ทุ่งวัดดอน	District seat
28	Sathon	สาทร	02	Yan Nawa	ยานนาวา	
28	Sathon	สาทร	03	Thung Maha Mek	ทุ่งมหาเมฆ	
29	Bang Sue	บางซื่อ	01	Bang Sue	บางซื่อ	District seat
29	Bang Sue	บางซื่อ	02	Wong Sawang	วงศ์สว่าง	
30	Chatuchak	จตุจักร	01	Lat Yao	ลาดยาว	
30	Chatuchak	จตุจักร	02	Sena Nikhom	เสนานิคม	
30	Chatuchak	จตุจักร	03	Chan Kasem	จันทรเกษม	
30	Chatuchak	จตุจักร	04	Chomphon	จอมพล	
30	Chatuchak	จตุจักร	05	Chatuchak	จตุจักร	District seat
31	Bang Kho Laem	บางคอแหลม	01	Bang Kho Laem	บางคอแหลม	District seat
31	Bang Kho Laem	บางคอแหลม	02	Wat Phraya Krai	วัดพระยาไกร	
31	Bang Kho Laem	บางคอแหลม	03	Bang Khlo	บางโคล่	
32	Prawet	ประเวศ	01	Prawet	ประเวศ	District seat
32	Prawet	ประเวศ	02	Nong Bon	หนองบอน	
32	Prawet	ประเวศ	03	Dok Mai	ดอกไม้	
33	Khlong Toei	คลองเตย	01	Khlong Toei	คลองเตย	District seat
33	Khlong Toei	คลองเตย	02	Khlong Tan	คลองตัน	
33	Khlong Toei	คลองเตย	03	Phra Khanong Subdistrict	พระโขนง	
34	Suan Luang	สวนหลวง	01	Suan Luang	สวนหลวง	
34	Suan Luang	สวนหลวง	02	On Nut	อ่อนนุช	
34	Suan Luang	สวนหลวง	03	Phatthanakan	พัฒนาการ	District seat
35	Chom Thong	จอมทอง	01	Bang Khun Thian	บางขุนเทียน	
35	Chom Thong	จอมทอง	02	Bang Kho	บางค้อ	
35	Chom Thong	จอมทอง	03	Bang Mot	บางมด	District seat
35	Chom Thong	จอมทอง	04	Chom Thong	จอมทอง	
36	Don Mueang	ดอนเมือง	02	Si Kan	สีกัน	
36	Don Mueang	ดอนเมือง	04	Don Mueang	ดอนเมือง	District seat
36	Don Mueang	ดอนเมือง	05	Sanambin	สนามบิน	
37	Ratchathewi	ราชเทวี	01	Thung Phaya Thai	ทุ่งพญาไท	District seat
37	Ratchathewi	ราชเทวี	02	Thanon Phaya Thai	ถนนพญาไท	
37	Ratchathewi	ราชเทวี	03	Thanon Phetchaburi	ถนนเพชรบุรี	
37	Ratchathewi	ราชเทวี	04	Makkasan	มักกะสัน	
38	Lat Phrao	ลาดพร้าว	01	Lat Phrao	ลาดพร้าว	District seat
38	Lat Phrao	ลาดพร้าว	02	Chorakhe Bua	จรเข้บัว	
39	Watthana	วัฒนา	01	Khlong Toei Nuea	คลองเตยเหนือ	
39	Watthana	วัฒนา	02	Khlong Tan Nuea	คลองตันเหนือ	District seat
39	Watthana	วัฒนา	03	Phra Khanong Nuea	พระโขนงเหนือ	
40	Bang Khae	บางแค	01	Bang Khae	บางแค	District seat
40	Bang Khae	บางแค	02	Bang Khae Nuea	บางแคเหนือ	
40	Bang Khae	บางแค	03	Bang Phai	บางไผ่	
40	Bang Khae	บางแค	04	Lak Song	หลักสอง	
41	Lak Si	หลักสี่	01	Thung Song Hong	ทุ่งสองห้อง	District seat
41	Lak Si	หลักสี่	02	Talat Bang Khen	ตลาดบางเขน	
42	Sai Mai	สายไหม	01	Sai Mai	สายไหม	
42	Sai Mai	สายไหม	02	O Ngoen	ออเงิน	District seat
42	Sai Mai	สายไหม	03	Khlong Thanon	คลองถนน	
43	Khan Na Yao	คันนายาว	01	Khan Na Yao	คันนายาว	District seat
43	Khan Na Yao	คันนายาว	02	Ram Inthra	รามอินทรา	
44	Saphan Sung	สะพานสูง	01	Saphan Sung	สะพานสูง	District seat
44	Saphan Sung	สะพานสูง	02	Rat Phatthana	ราษฎร์พัฒนา	
44	Saphan Sung	สะพานสูง	03	Thap Chang	ทับช้าง	
45	Wang Thonglang	วังทองหลาง	01	Wang Thonglang	วังทองหลาง	
45	Wang Thonglang	วังทองหลาง	02	Saphan Song	สะพานสอง	
45	Wang Thonglang	วังทองหลาง	03	Khlong Chaokhun Sing	คลองเจ้าคุณสิงห์	
45	Wang Thonglang	วังทองหลาง	04	Phlapphla	พลับพลา	District seat
46	Khlong Sam Wa	คลองสามวา	01	Sam Wa Tawan Tok	สามวาตะวันตก	
46	Khlong Sam Wa	คลองสามวา	02	Sam Wa Tawan Ok	สามวาตะวันออก	
46	Khlong Sam Wa	คลองสามวา	03	Bang Chan	บางชัน	District seat
46	Khlong Sam Wa	คลองสามวา	04	Sai Kong Din	ทรายกองดิน	
46	Khlong Sam Wa	คลองสามวา	05	Sai Kong Din Tai	ทรายกองดินใต้	
47	Bang Na	บางนา	02	Bang Na Nuea	บางนาเหนือ	District seat
47	Bang Na	บางนา	03	Bang Na Tai	บางนาใต้	
48	Thawi Watthana	ทวีวัฒนา	01	Thawi Watthana	ทวีวัฒนา	District seat
48	Thawi Watthana	ทวีวัฒนา	02	Sala Thammasop	ศาลาธรรมสพน์	
49	Thung Khru	ทุ่งครุ	01	Bang Mot	บางมด	
49	Thung Khru	ทุ่งครุ	02	Thung Khru	ทุ่งครุ	District seat
50	Bang Bon	บางบอน	02	Bang Bon Nuea	บางบอนเหนือ	
50	Bang Bon	บางบอน	03	Bang Bon Tai	บางบอนใต้	District seat
50	Bang Bon	บางบอน	04	Khlong Bang Phran	คลองบางพราน	
50	Bang Bon	บางบอน	05	Khlong Bang Bon	คลองบางบอน	

== Khwaeng in city municipalities ==
City municipality (thesaban nakhon)			Subdistrict (khwaeng)		
Code	Name	Name (Thai)	Code	Name	Name (Thai)
1299	Nonthaburi	นนทบุรี		Tha Sai	ท่าทราย
1299	Nonthaburi	นนทบุรี		Suan Yai	สวนใหญ่
5099	Chiang Mai	เชียงใหม่		Nakhon Phing	นครพิงค์
5099	Chiang Mai	เชียงใหม่		Kawila	กาวิละ
5099	Chiang Mai	เชียงใหม่		Mengrai	เม็งราย
5099	Chiang Mai	เชียงใหม่		Si Wichai	ศรีวิชัย
9098	Hat Yai	หาดใหญ่		Hat Yai Nai	หาดใหญ่ใน
9098	Hat Yai	หาดใหญ่		Hat Yai Nok	หาดใหญ่นอก
9098	Hat Yai	หาดใหญ่		Si Phuwanat	ศรีภูวนารถ
	Pattaya	เมืองพัทยา		Ko Lan	เกาะล้าน

== See also ==
- Subdivisions of Thailand
