= Suan Luang district =

Suan Luang สวนหลวง
- District
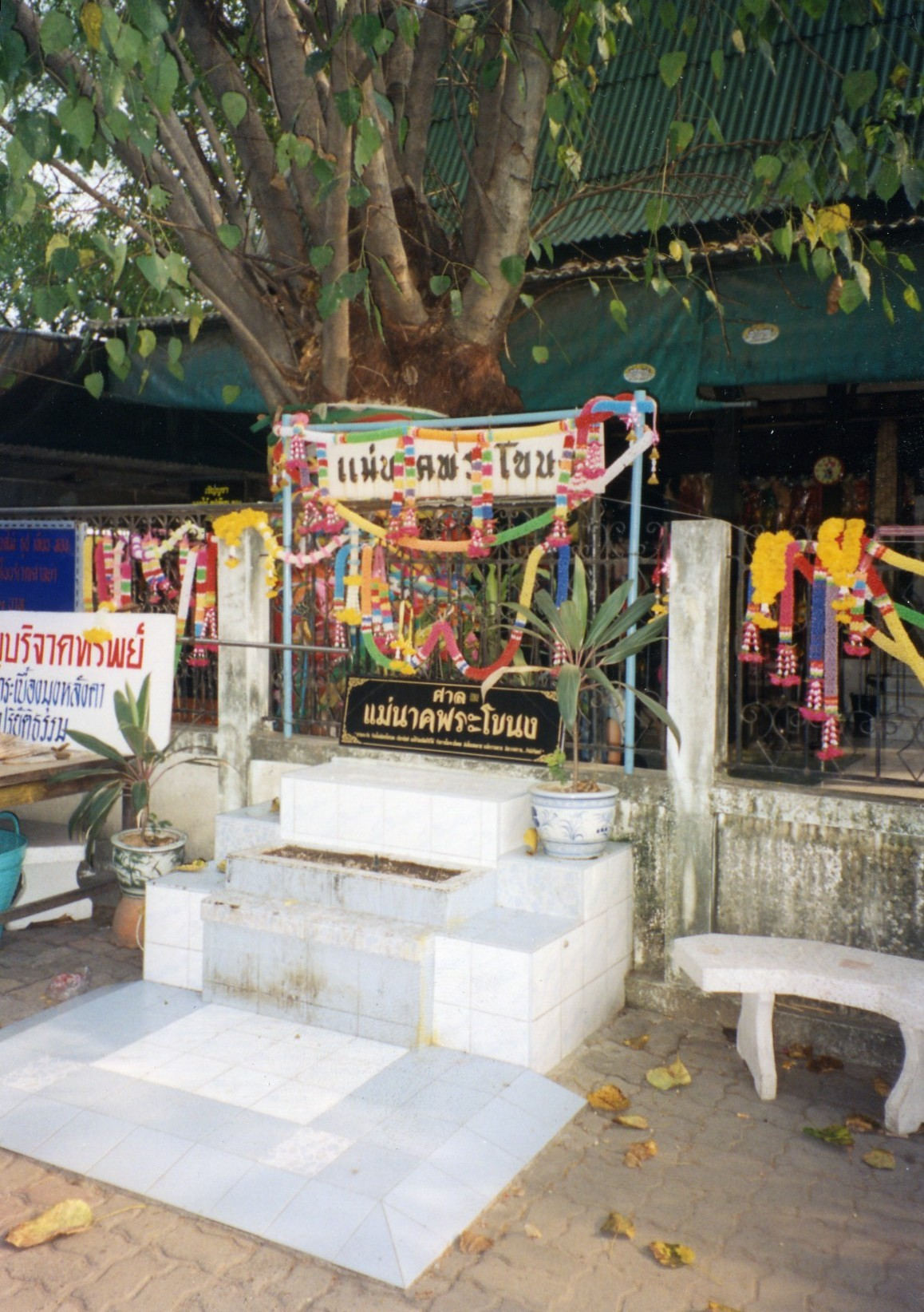
- Outer perimeter of the shrine to Mae Nak Phra Khanong at Wat Mahabut.
- Etymology: Royal Garden
- District location in Bangkok
- Coordinates: 13°43′49″N 100°39′5″E
- Country: Thailand
- Province: Bangkok
- Seat: Phatthanakan
- Khwaeng: 3
- District established: 14 January 1994

Area
  - Total: 23.678 km^{2} (9.142 sq mi)

Population (2017)
  - Total: 122,534
  - Density: 5,175.01/km^{2} (13,403.2/sq mi)
- Time zone: UTC+7 (ICT)
- Postal code: 10250
- Geocode: 1034

Suan Luang (Thai: สวนหลวง, pronounced [sǔan lǔaŋ]) is one of the 50 districts (khet) of Bangkok, Thailand. It is bounded by other Bangkok districts (from north clockwise): Bang Kapi, Saphan Sung, Prawet, Phra Khanong, and Watthana.

== History ==
Suan Luang was a sub-district of Phra Khanong District. When Phra Khanong district was split into smaller districts on 9 November 1989, Suan Luang became part of the new Prawet District. On 14 January 1994 (following its announcement on 8 October 1993) Suan Luang was elevated to a district, merging the area once belonging to Suan Luang Sub-district with additional land from Prawet and Khlong Toei. Suan Luang Sub-district remained the only sub-district until 2017, when the two new sub-districts of On Nut and Phatthanakan were created.

Its name literally translates to "royal garden," named after a sub-district in the area that once existed during the early Rattanakosin era (18th century).

== Administration ==
The district has three sub-districts (khwaeng).

No.	Name	Thai	Area (km^{2})	Map
1.	Suan Luang	สวนหลวง	9.251	Map
2.	On Nut	อ่อนนุช	5.894	Map
3.	Phatthanakan	พัฒนาการ	8.533	Map
Total			23.678	Map

== Places ==
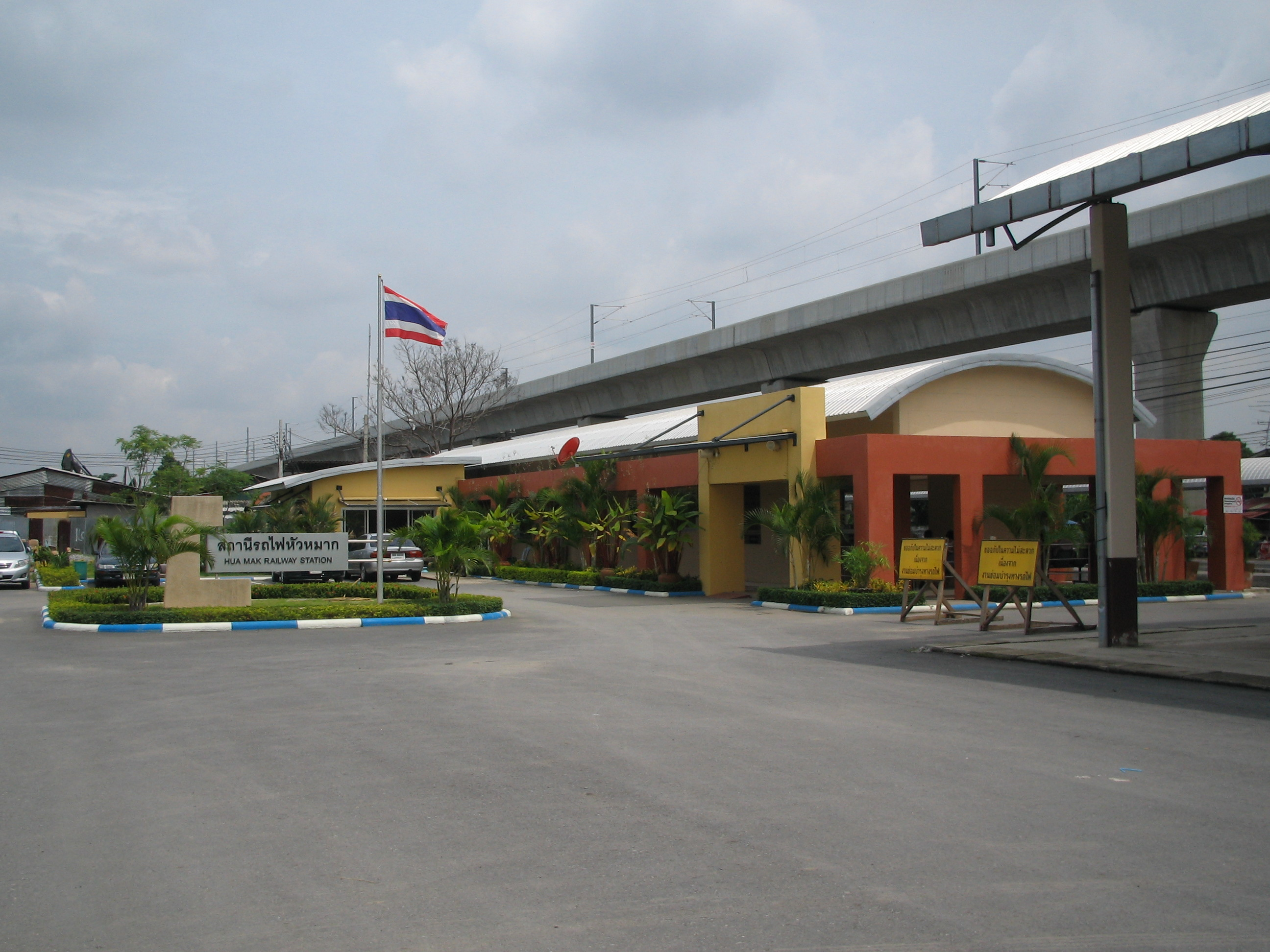
Hua Mak Railway Station

- Wat Maha But is well known for its Mae Nak shrine. Numerous works of fiction and films including Nang Nak were influenced by Mae Nak.

== Education ==
- St. Mark's International School Bangkok is in the district.
- Thai-Nichi Institute of Technology
- Triam Udom Suksa Pattanakarn School
- Asokwit Onnut School
