= Bueng Kum district =

Bueng Kum บึงกุ่ม
- Khet
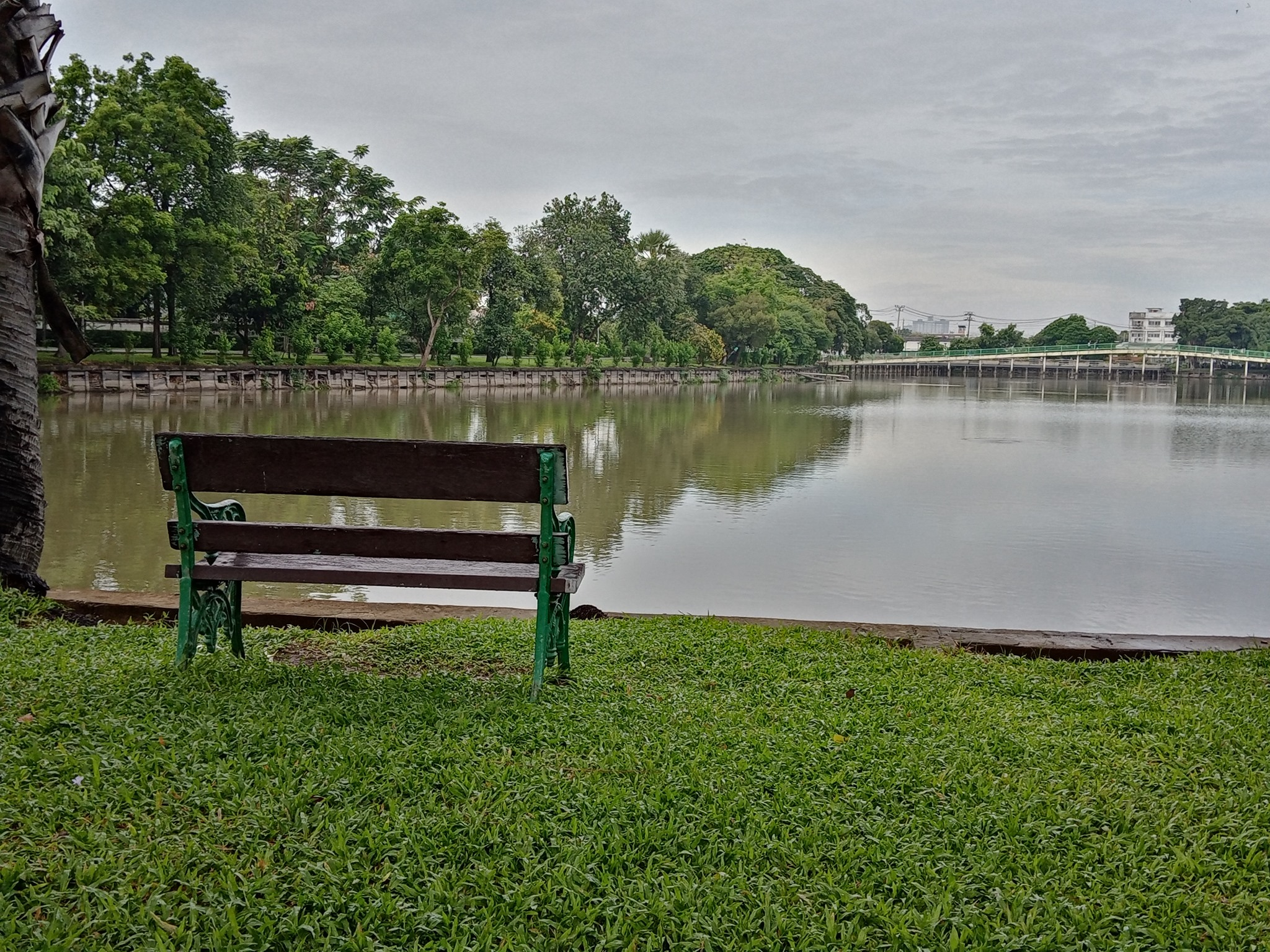
- Seri Thai Park

- Khet location in Bangkok
- Coordinates: 13°47′7″N 100°40′9″E
- Country: Thailand
- Province: Bangkok
- Seat: Khlong Kum
- Khwaeng: 3
- Khet established: 4 September 1989

Area
  - Total: 24.311 km^{2} (9.387 sq mi)

Population (2017)
  - Total: 143,835
  - Density: 5,916.45/km^{2} (15,323.5/sq mi)
- Time zone: UTC+7 (ICT)
- Postal code: 10240 except Mu 9-12 Khwaeng Khlong Kum: 10230
- Geocode: 1027

Bueng Kum (Thai: บึงกุ่ม, pronounced [bɯ̄ŋ kùm]) is one of the 50 districts (Khet) of Bangkok, Thailand. From north clockwise, it is bounded by Bang Khen, Khan Na Yao, Saphan Sung, Bang Kapi, and Lat Phrao.

== History ==
Bueng Kum was separated from Bang Kapi on 4 September 1989. It consisted of three sub-districts: Khlong Kum, Khan Na Yao, and Saphan Sung. On 14 October 1997, Khan Na Yao and Saphan Sung were elevated to districts, leaving Bueng Kum with a sole sub-district, Khlong Kum.

Bueng Kum was named so because of a lake ("bueng" means 'lake') used as water reservoir for flood prevention. There are also plants called "kum" (Crataeva sp.) around the lake. The lake is part of Seri Thai Park.

== Administration ==
The district is divided into three sub-districts (khwaeng).

No.	Name	Thai	Area (km^{2})	Map
1.	Khlong Kum	คลองกุ่ม	10.811	Map
4.	Nawamin	นวมินทร์	4.885	Map
5.	Nuan Chan	นวลจันทร์	8.615	Map
Total			24.311	Map

The missing numbers 2 and 3 belong to the sub-districts which were split off to form Saphan Sung and Khan Na Yao districts.

== District council ==
The District Council for Bueng Kum has seven members, who each serve four-year terms.

== Places ==
- Seri Thai Park, a public park
- Seri Thai Memorial Hall and Museum in Seri Thai Park
- Pattavikorn Market, large second-hand items market
