= Suan Luang subdistrict, Bangkok =

Suan Luang สวนหลวง
- Khwaeng
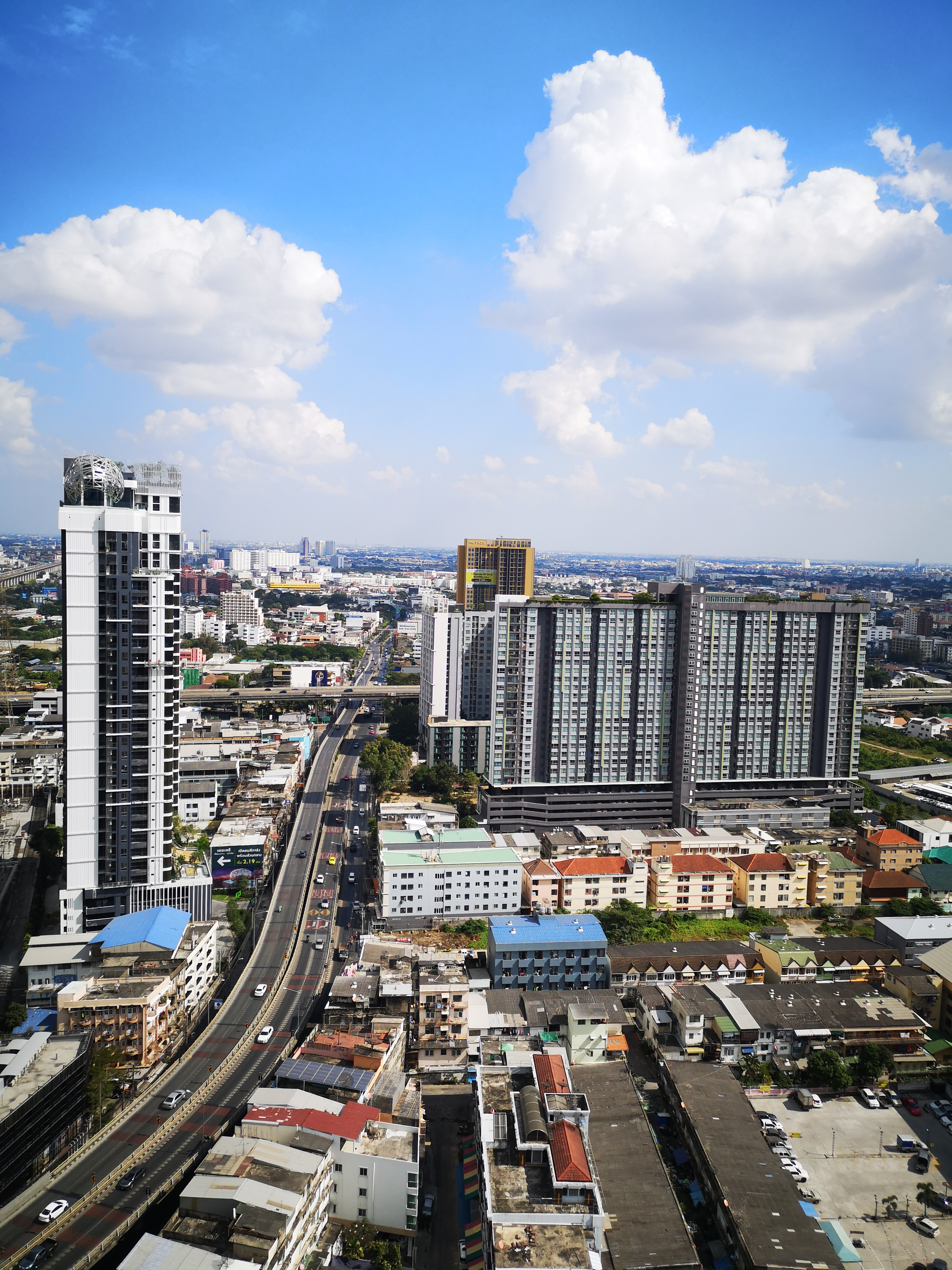
- Phatthanakan intersection

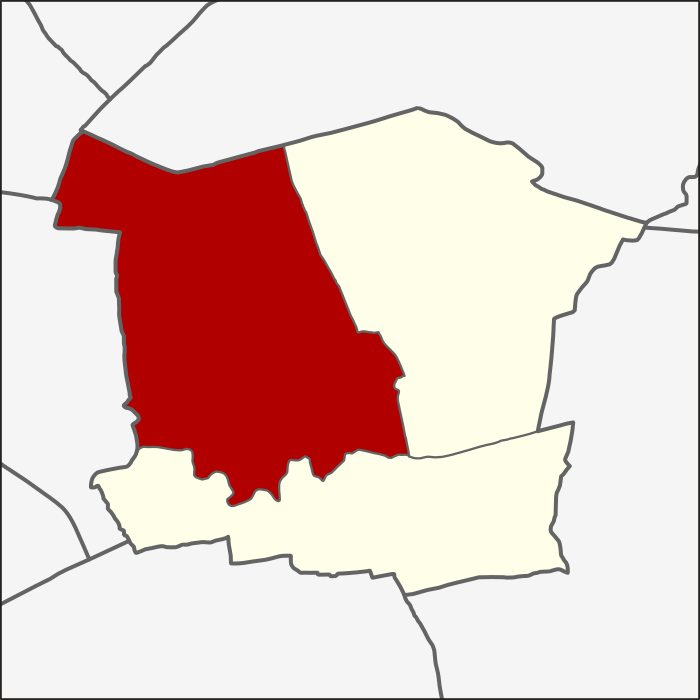
- Location in Suan Luang District
- Country: Thailand
- Province: Bangkok
- Khet: Suan Luang

Area
  - Total: 9.251 km^{2} (3.572 sq mi)

Population (2020)
  - Total: 48,207
- Time zone: UTC+7 (ICT)
- Postal code: 10250
- TIS 1099: 103401

Suan Luang (Thai: สวนหลวง, pronounced [sǔa̯n lǔa̯ŋ]) is a khwaeng (subdistrict) of Suan Luang District, in Bangkok, Thailand. In 2020, it had a total population of 48,207 people.
