= Nawamin Subdistrict =

Nawamin นวมินทร์
- Khwaeng
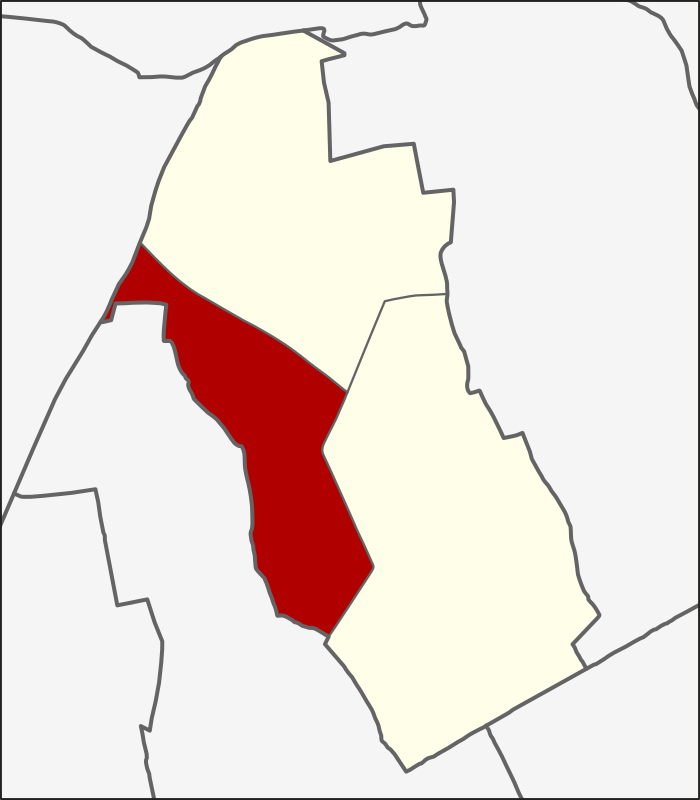
- Location in Bueng Kum District
- Country: Thailand
- Province: Bangkok
- Khet: Bueng Kum

Area
  - Total: 4.885 km^{2} (1.886 sq mi)

Population (2023)
  - Total: 26,338
- Time zone: UTC+7 (ICT)

Nawamin (Thai: นวมินทร์, pronounced [ná.wá.mìn]) is a khwaeng (subdistrict) of Bueng Kum District, in Bangkok, Thailand. In 2023, it had a total population of 26,338 people.
