= Bang Kho =

Bang Kho บางค้อ
- Khwaeng
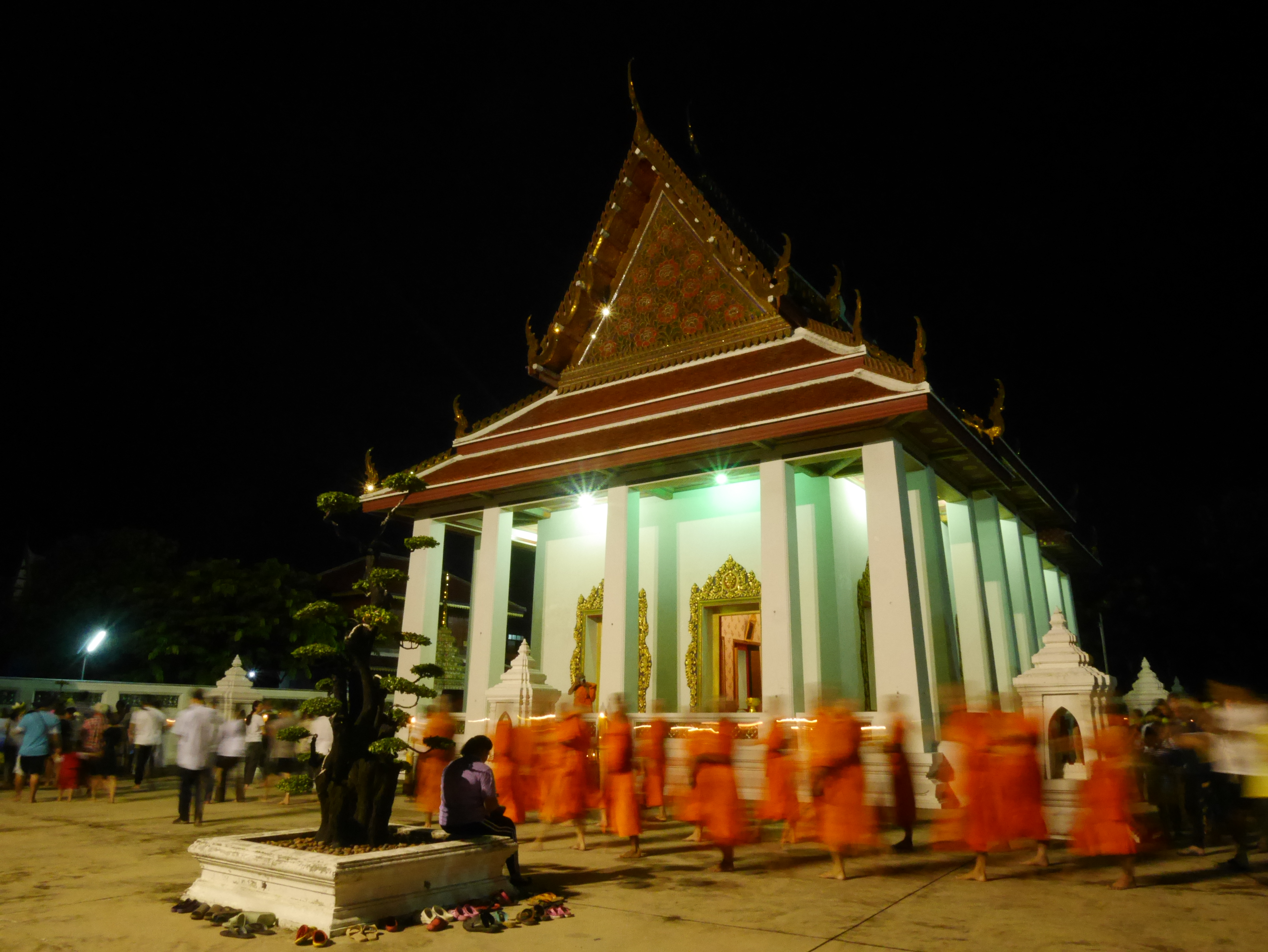
- Wat Nang

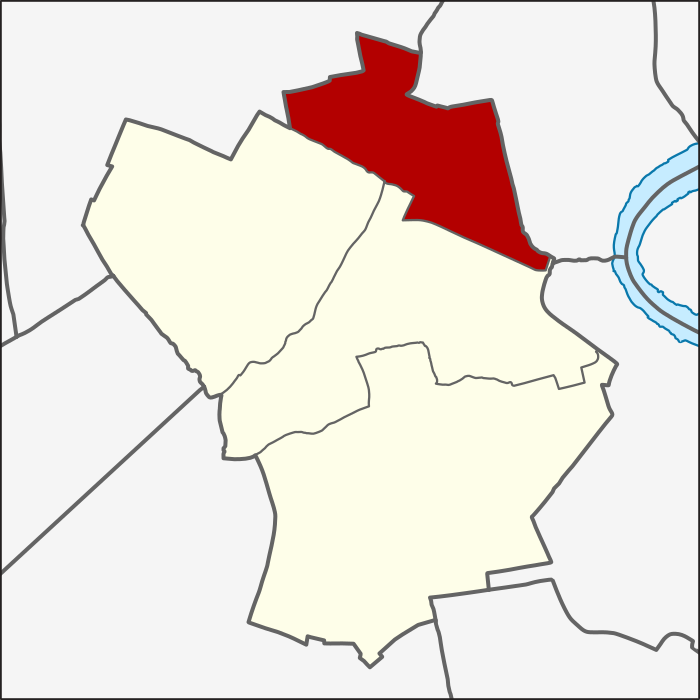
- Location in Chom Thong district
- Country: Thailand
- Province: Bangkok
- Khet: Chom Thong

Area
  - Total: 3.375 km^{2} (1.303 sq mi)

Population (2020)
  - Total: 34,855
- Time zone: UTC+7 (ICT)
- Postal code: 10150
- TIS 1099: 103502

Bang Kho (Thai: บางค้อ, pronounced [bāːŋ kʰɔ́ː]) is a khwaeng (subdistrict) of Chom Thong district, in Bangkok, Thailand. In 2020, it had a total population of 34,855 people.
