= On Nut subdistrict =

On Nut อ่อนนุช
- Khwaeng
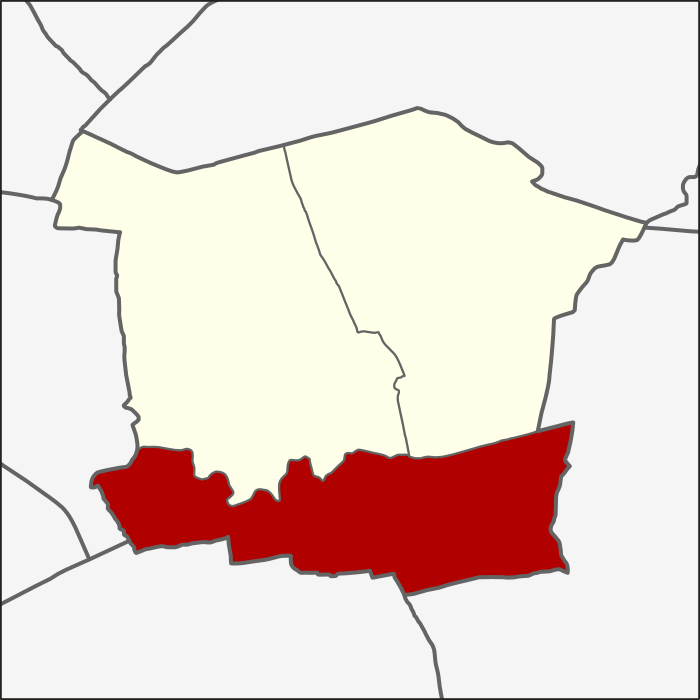
- Location in Suan Luang District
- Country: Thailand
- Province: Bangkok
- Khet: Suan Luang

Area
  - Total: 5.894 km^{2} (2.276 sq mi)

Population (2020)
  - Total: 44,427
- Time zone: UTC+7 (ICT)
- Postal code: 10250
- TIS 1099: 103402

On Nut (Thai: อ่อนนุช, pronounced [ʔɔ̀ːn nút]) is a khwaeng (subdistrict) of Suan Luang District, in Bangkok, Thailand. It was created in 2017, split off from Suan Luang Subdistrict along with Phatthanakan Subdistrict.

In 2020, it had a total population of 44,427 people.
