= Triamudomsuksapattanakarn Ratchada School =

Triamudomsuksa Pattanakarn Ratchada School
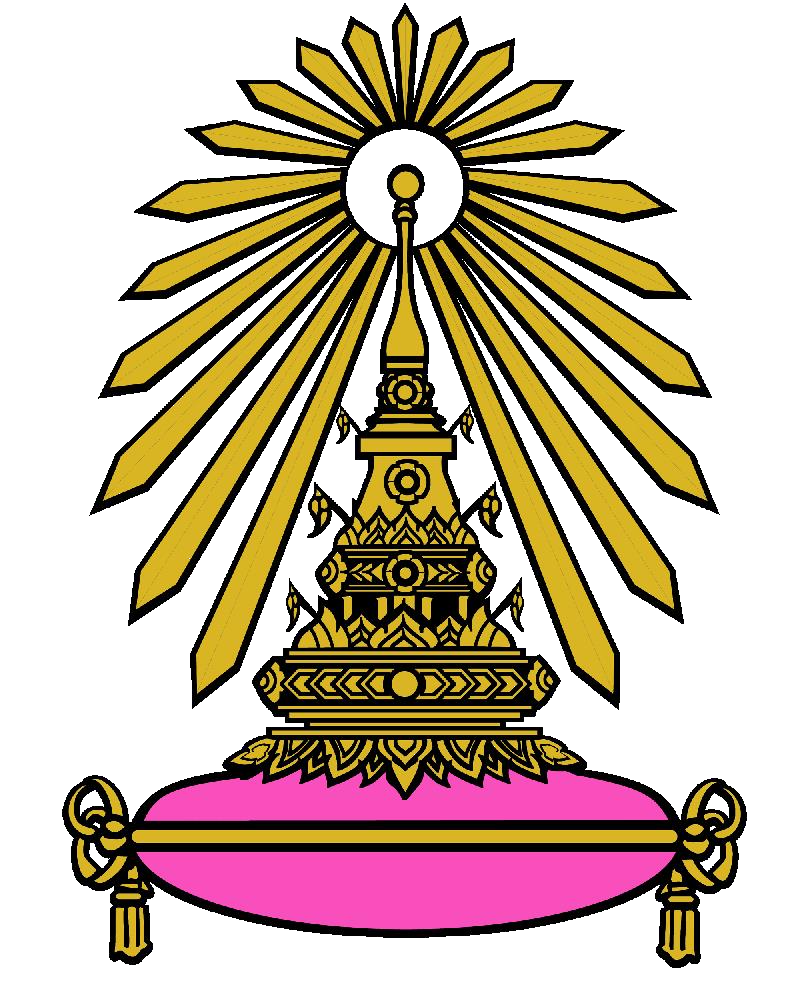

Location
- 170 Ratchadaphisek Road, Huay Kwang Bangkok; Thailand
- Coordinates: 13°46′22.8″N 100°34′25.7″E

Information
- Type: Government
- Motto: Philosophy, Academic excellence and morality
- Established: 11 August 1961 (As Pracharat Upatham), 10 February 2003 (As Triampatrachada)
- Status: Secondary school level
- School board: Bangkok Education Service Area Office 2
- School district: Huai Kwang
- Authority: Office of the Basic Education Commission
- School number: 1010720084
- Director: Kannika Phathaichan
- Teaching staff: 159
- Grades: 7-12 (mathayom 1–6)
- Gender: Coeducational
- Enrollment: ~ 3500
- Average class size: 40
- Student to teacher ratio: 1:25
- Language: Thai; English; Chinese; French; Japanese
- Campus type: Urban
- Colour: Pink-blue
- Song: Triampatratchada's March
- Nickname: Triampatratchada, TUPR
- Website: www.tupr.ac.th

Triamudomsuksa pattanakarn Ratchada School (TUPR) (Thai: โรงเรียนเตรียมอุดมศึกษาพัฒนาการ รัชดา [trīːəm ùʔdōm sɯ̀k.săː rat tʃʰa daː]) originally known as Pracharat Upatham School, and often nicknamed as Triampatratchada is a school located in Bangkok, Thailand. The school covers around 10 Rai (16,000 m²) and it educates around 3,500 students from Mathayom 1 - 6 (Grade 7 - 12). It is also next to Ratchadaphisek Road which makes it easy for students to go to this school
