= Khlong Sip Song subdistrict =

Khlong Sip Song คลองสิบสอง
- Khwaeng
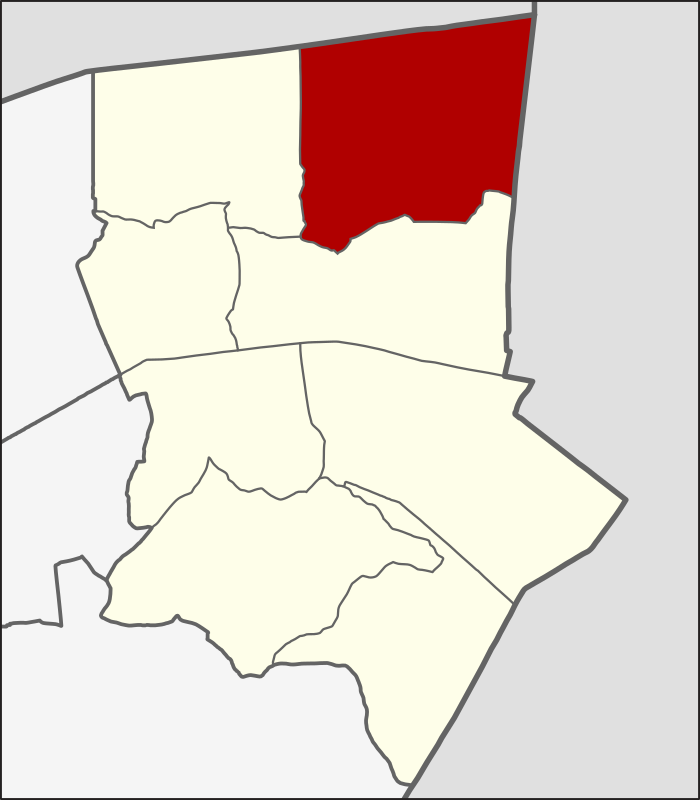
- Location in Nong Chok District
- Country: Thailand
- Province: Bangkok
- Khet: Nong Chok

Area
  - Total: 38.867 km^{2} (15.007 sq mi)

Population (2020)
  - Total: 11,858
- Time zone: UTC+7 (ICT)
- Postal code: 10530
- TIS 1099: 100304

Khlong Sip Song (Thai: คลองสิบสอง, pronounced [kʰlɔ̄ːŋ sìp sɔ̌ːŋ]) is a khwaeng (subdistrict) of Nong Chok District, in Bangkok, Thailand. In 2020, it had a total population of 11,858 people.
