= Sam Sen Nok Subdistrict =

Sam Sen Nok สามเสนนอก
- Khwaeng
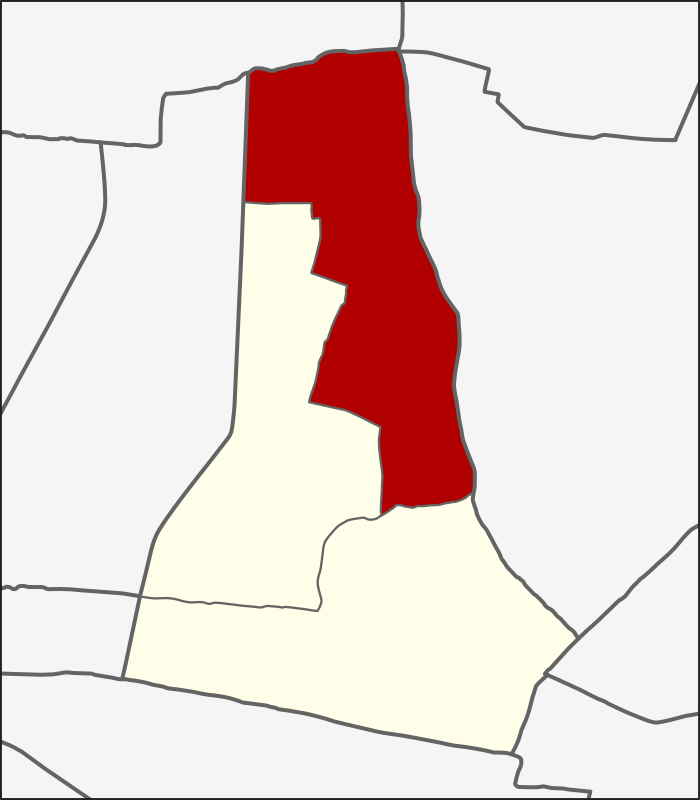
- Location in Huai Khwang District
- Country: Thailand
- Province: Bangkok
- Khet: Huai Khwang

Area
  - Total: 4.283 km^{2} (1.654 sq mi)

Population (2019)
  - Total: 38,010
- Time zone: UTC+7 (ICT)

Sam Sen Nok (Thai: สามเสนนอก, pronounced [sǎːm sēn nɔ̀ːk]) is a khwaeng (subdistrict) in Huai Khwang District, Bangkok. In 2019, it had a population of 38,010 people.
