= Khok Faet =

Khok Faet โคกแฝด
- Khwaeng
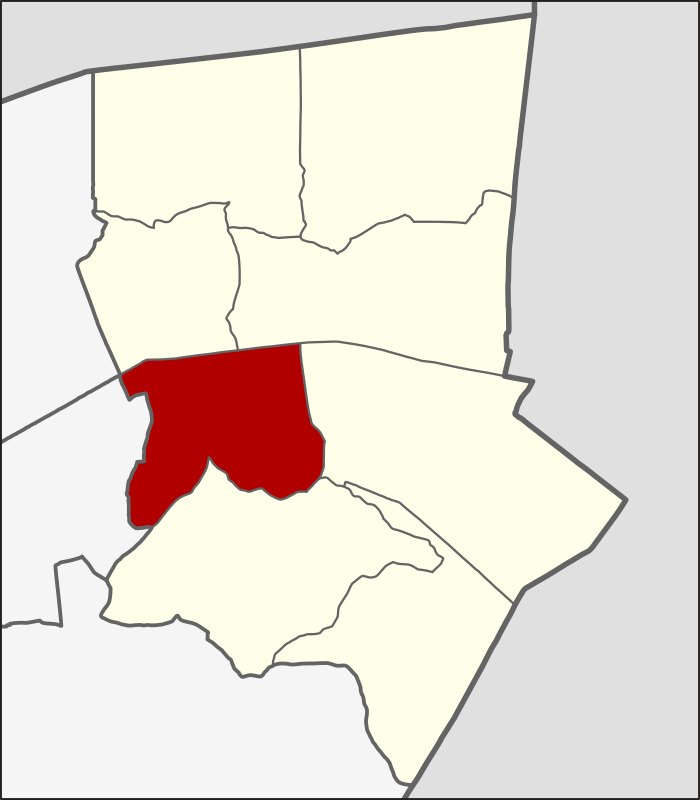
- Location in Nong Chok District
- Country: Thailand
- Province: Bangkok
- Khet: Nong Chok

Population (2019)
  - Total: 34,190
- Time zone: UTC+7 (ICT)
- Postal code: 10530
- TIS 1099: 100305

Khok Faet (Thai: โคกแฝด, pronounced [kʰòːk fæ̀t]) is a khwaeng (subdistrict) of Nong Chok district, in Bangkok, Thailand. In 2019, it had a total population of 34,190.
