= Nong Chok subdistrict, Bangkok =

Nong Chok หนองจอก
- Khwaeng
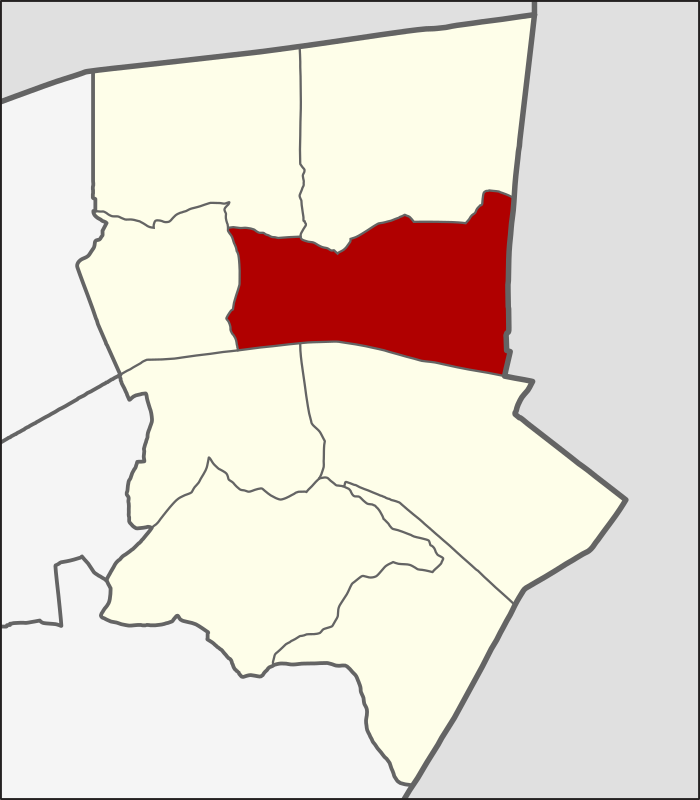
- Location in Nong Chok District
- Country: Thailand
- Province: Bangkok
- Khet: Nong Chok

Area
  - Total: 29.992 km^{2} (11.580 sq mi)

Population (2020)
  - Total: 22,945
- Time zone: UTC+7 (ICT)
- Postal code: 10530
- TIS 1099: 100302

Nong Chok (Thai: หนองจอก, pronounced [nɔ̌ːŋ t͡ɕɔ̀ːk]) is a khwaeng (subdistrict) of Nong Chok District, in Bangkok, Thailand. In 2020, it had a total population of 22,945 people.
