= Khu Fang Nuea =

Khu Fang Nuea คู้ฝั่งเหนือ
- Khwaeng
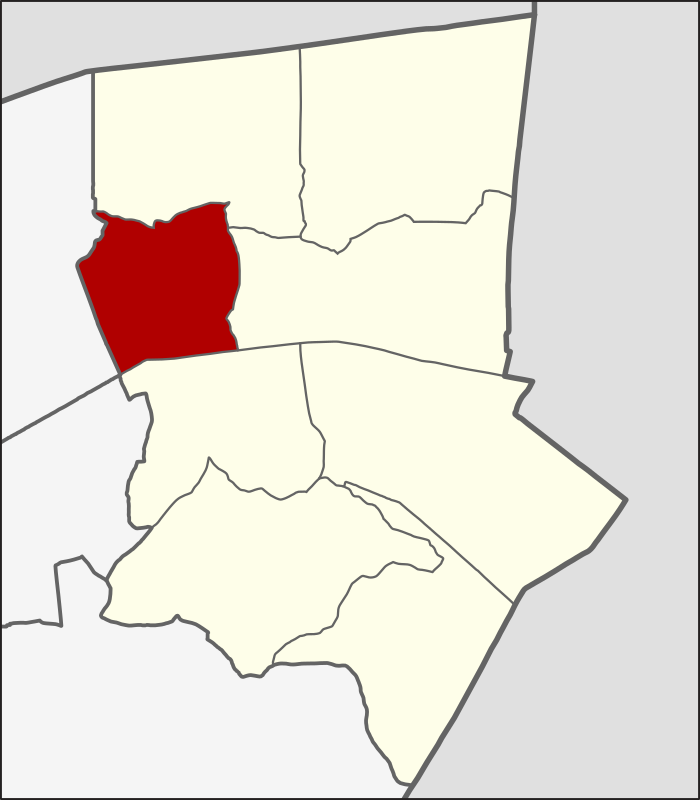
- Location in Nong Chok District
- Country: Thailand
- Province: Bangkok
- Khet: Nong Chok

Area
  - Total: 17.750 km^{2} (6.853 sq mi)

Population (2020)
  - Total: 17,927
- Time zone: UTC+7 (ICT)
- Postal code: 10530
- TIS 1099: 100306

Khu Fang Nuea (Thai: คู้ฝั่งเหนือ, pronounced [kʰúː fàŋ nɯ̌a̯]) is a khwaeng (subdistrict) of Nong Chok District, in Bangkok, Thailand. In 2020, it had a total population of 17,927 people.
