= Phatthanakan subdistrict =

Phatthanakan พัฒนาการ
- Khwaeng
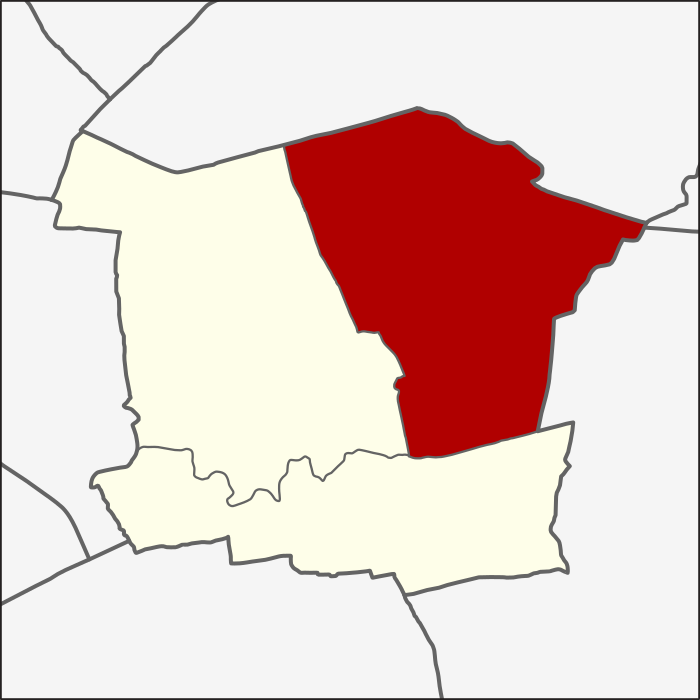
- Location in Suan Luang District
- Country: Thailand
- Province: Bangkok
- Khet: Suan Luang

Area
  - Total: 8.533 km^{2} (3.295 sq mi)

Population (2020)
  - Total: 30,975
- Time zone: UTC+7 (ICT)
- Postal code: 10250
- TIS 1099: 103403

Phatthanakan (Thai: พัฒนาการ, pronounced [pʰát.tʰā.nāː.kāːn]) is a khwaeng (subdistrict) of Suan Luang District, in Bangkok, Thailand. It was created in 2017, split off from Suan Luang Subdistrict along with On Nut Subdistrict.

In 2020, it had a total population of 30,975 people.
