= Lam Toiting =

Lam Toiting ลำต้อยติ่ง
- Khwaeng
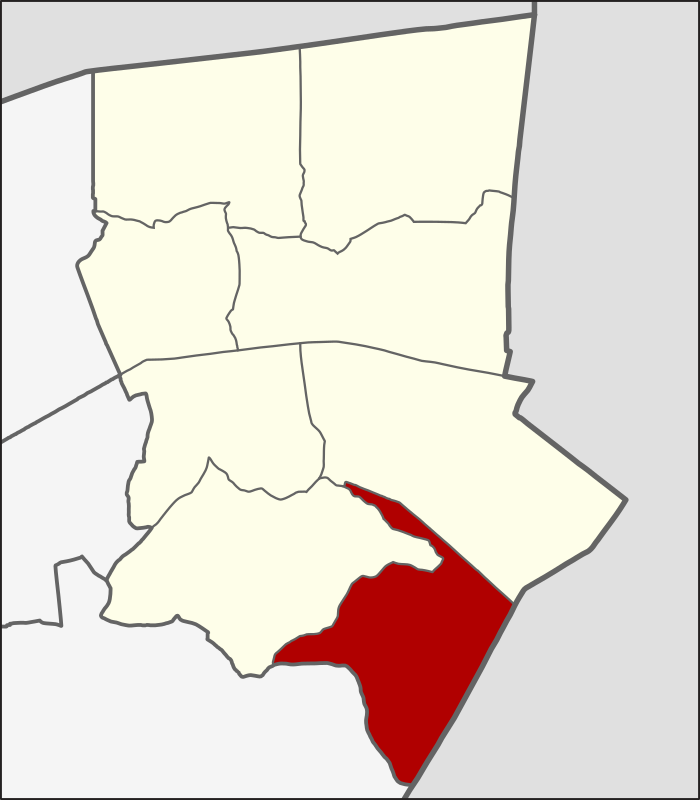
- Location in Nong Chok District
- Country: Thailand
- Province: Bangkok
- Khet: Nong Chok

Area
  - Total: 24.789 km^{2} (9.571 sq mi)

Population (2020)
  - Total: 9,706
- Time zone: UTC+7 (ICT)
- Postal code: 10530
- TIS 1099: 100308

Lam Toiting (Thai: ลำต้อยติ่ง, pronounced [lām tɔ̂j.tìŋ]) is a khwaeng (subdistrict) of Nong Chok District, in Bangkok, Thailand. In 2020, it had a total population of 9,706 people.
