= Nuan Chan Subdistrict =

Nuan Chan นวลจันทร์
- Khwaeng
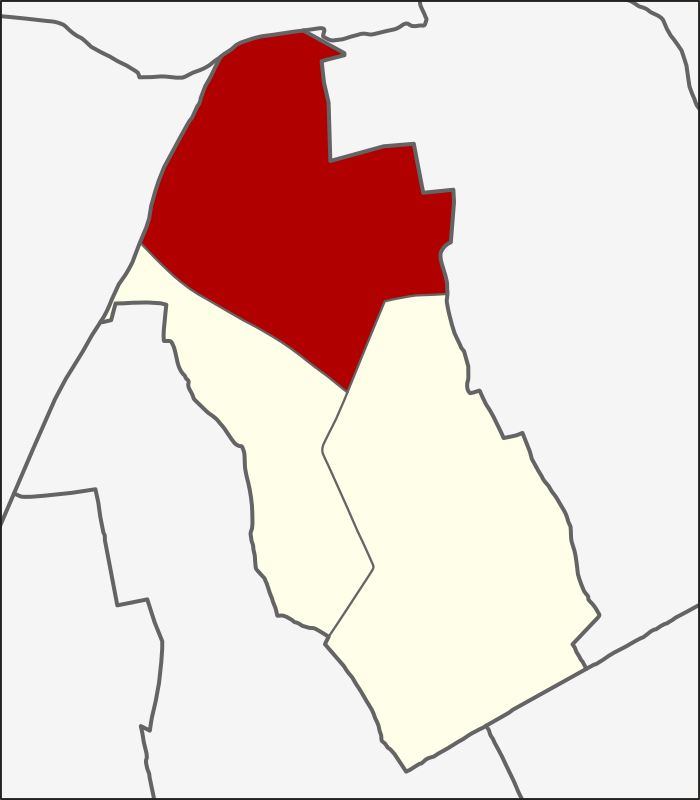
- Location in Bueng Kum District
- Country: Thailand
- Province: Bangkok
- Khet: Bueng Kum

Area
  - Total: 8.615 km^{2} (3.326 sq mi)

Population (2023)
  - Total: 43,855
- Time zone: UTC+7 (ICT)

Nuan Chan (Thai: นวลจันทร์, pronounced [nûan t͡ɕan]) is a khwaeng (subdistrict) of Bueng Kum District, in Bangkok, Thailand. In 2023, it had a total population of 43,855 people.
