= Lam Phak Chi =

Lam Phak Chi ลำผักชี
- Khwaeng
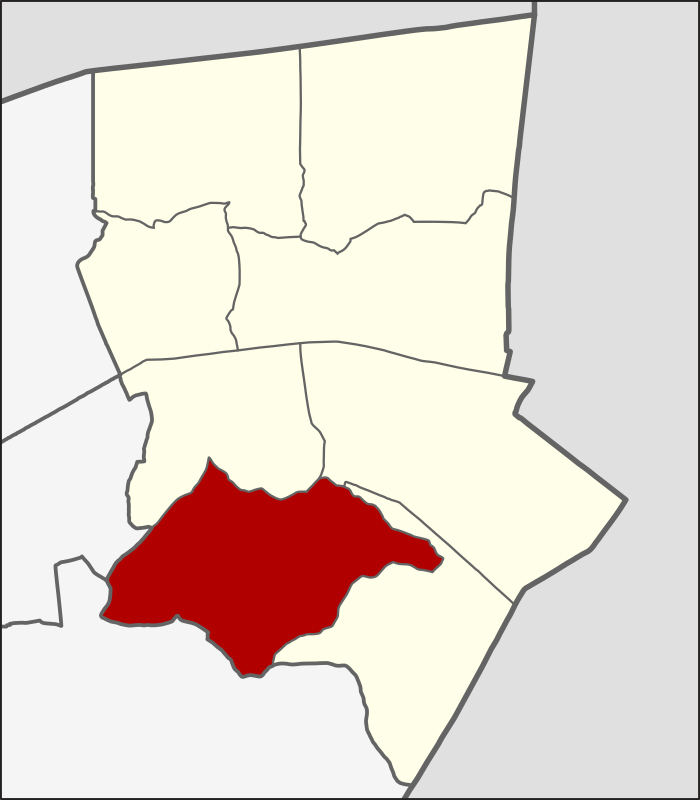
- Location in Nong Chok District
- Country: Thailand
- Province: Bangkok
- Khet: Nong Chok

Area
  - Total: 33.358 km^{2} (12.880 sq mi)

Population (2020)
  - Total: 31,810
- Time zone: UTC+7 (ICT)
- Postal code: 10530
- TIS 1099: 100307

Lam Phak Chi (Thai: ลำผักชี, pronounced [lām pʰàk t͡ɕʰīː]) is a khwaeng (subdistrict) of Nong Chok District, in Bangkok, Thailand. In 2020, it had a total population of 31,810 people.

On August 1, 2016, Thai Regional Airline Flight 106, a Piper PA-31 Navajo crashed in the khwaeng after striking a pole. There was one death and five injuries.
