= Nong Chok Park =

Park in Bangkok, Thailand

Coordinates: 13.852299°N 100.859370°E

Nong Chok Park

Nong Chok Park (Thai: สวนหนองจอก, RTGS: Suan Nong Chok, pronounced [sǔa̯n nɔ̌ːŋ t͡ɕɔ̀ːk]) is one of 49 parks in Bangkok. It opens daily from 05.00-20.00. It is also known as "beautiful banyan park" (สวนไทรงาม, RTGS: Suan Sai Ngam, pronounced [sǔa̯n sāj ŋāːm]) due to its beauty design of the walkway that is covered by banyan trees and green bushes and flowers, also decorated with big pond with lotus and fishes. Nong Chjok youth center is also located in Nong Chok park.

== History ==
The area was used as provincial administration organization's, interior ministry, chicken farm. Later transferred to Bangkok administration according to the enactment of administration 1975. Nong Chok district department then, as the owner of the field, renovated the wasteland to Nong Chok park, in order to dedicate to his majesty the king to celebrate for his 60th birthday on 5 December 1987, by using the green area for people around the area to take rest, as children playground, and to organize any traditional events. Nong Chok park was opened for the people officially on 27 November 1987. Later handed to public area department to manage on 2 November 1989.

== Activity ==
- Swimming: A 12.50 x 25m pool is provided in the Nong Chok Youth center building.
- Gym: Located on the 2nd floor of Nong Chok Youth center building.
- Taekwondo: Located on the 1st floor of Nong Chok Youth center building.
- Online-library: Located on the 1st floor of Nong Chok Youth center building.
- Art activity: Located on the 1st floor of Nong Chok Youth center building.
- Yoga: Located on the 1st floor of Nong Chok Youth center building.
- Music: Located on the 2nd floor of Nong Chok Youth center building.
- Mini theater: Located on the 2nd floor of Nong Chok Youth center building.
- Indoor sports: Provided 1 basketball court and 4 shuttle badminton court.
- Aerobics dance: Starts from 5pm daily at the outdoor patio.
- Children playground
- Jogging
- Cycling
