= Nong Chok district =

Nong Chok หนองจอก
- Khet
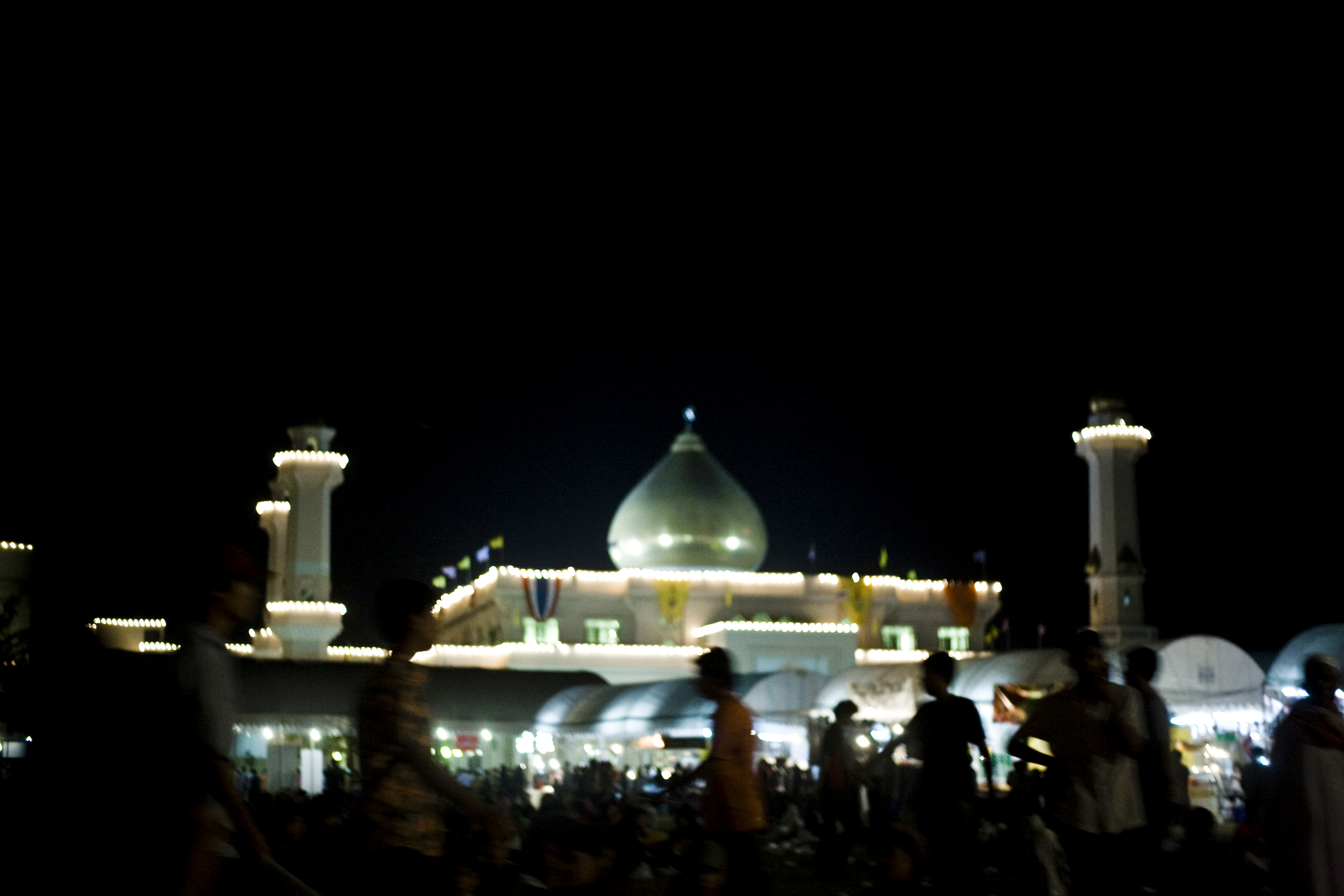
- The National Administration Center for Islamic Affairs in late 2009

- Khet location in Bangkok
- Coordinates: 13°51′20″N 100°51′45″E
- Country: Thailand
- Province: Bangkok
- Seat: Krathum Rai
- Khwaeng: 8

Area
  - Total: 236.261 km^{2} (91.221 sq mi)

Population (2017)
  - Total: 170,643
  - Density: 722.26/km^{2} (1,870.6/sq mi)
- Time zone: UTC+7 (THA)
- Postal code: 10530
- Geocode: 1003

Nong Chok (Thai: หนองจอก, pronounced [nɔ̌ːŋ t͡ɕɔ̀ːk]) is one of the 50 districts (khet) of Bangkok, Thailand. It is bounded by other districts (from north clockwise): Amphoe Lam Luk Ka of Pathum Thani province, Amphoe Bang Nam Priao and Amphoe Mueang Chachoengsao of Chachoengsao province, Lat Krabang, Min Buri and Khlong Sam Wa of Bangkok. It is the biggest, easternmost and the most sparsely populated district of Bangkok.

== History ==
The district was established as an amphoe in 1897 during the reign of King Chulalongkorn. The original settlers were Muslims relocated from southern Thailand. In 1902, it became an amphoe of the newly established Min Buri province. Due to economic hardship during 1930–31, Min Buri Province was disbanded in 1931 and Nong Chok was transferred to Chachoengsao province.

District administration was later moved again to Bangkok in 1932 due to inconvenience of travel between Nong Chok and Chachoengsao. As of 2006, about 75% of the population were Muslims while 22% were Buddhists. The name Nong Chok means water lettuce (Pistia stratiotes) swamp.

== Administration ==
The district is sub-divided into eight sub-districts (khwaeng).

No.	Name	Thai	Area (km^{2})	Map
1.	Krathum Rai	กระทุ่มราย	38.132	Map
2.	Nong Chok	หนองจอก	29.992	Map
3.	Khlong Sip	คลองสิบ	30.849	Map
4.	Khlong Sip Song	คลองสิบสอง	38.867	Map
5.	Khok Faet	โคกแฝด	22.524	Map
6.	Khu Fang Nuea	คู้ฝั่งเหนือ	17.750	Map
7.	Lam Phak Chi	ลำผักชี	33.358	Map
8.	Lam Toiting	ลำต้อยติ่ง	24.789	Map
Total			236.261	Map

== Economy ==
Agriculture was and remains the most important part of Nong Chok economy. Rice, vegetables, fruits, and livestocks are the main products. It is famous for its gamecocks and birdcages. Many canals were dug for irrigation and transportation.

== Environment ==
With its rural environment and surrounding agricultural lands, Nong Chok remains the last natural habitat of flying fox colonies in the Bangkok area.

Nong Chok is said to have as many as 104 canals, making it is the district with the most canals in Bangkok. In the past, people in Nong Chok mainly traveled into the city by boat. The journey used to take a long time, leaving around midnight and arriving at Pratunam around 5 a.m.

One account suggests that when the environment was still pristine, it was possible to see as far as Chachoengsao and even some of the hills in the Bang Pla Soi area of Chonburi from Nong Chok.

== Places ==
Nong Chok Park

- Bangkok Arena
- Mahanakorn University of Technology
- Nong Chok National Football Center
- Nong Chok Park
- Wetchakarunrasm Hospital
- Harajuku Thailand
- The National Administration Center for Islamic Affairs

== Education ==
International schools include:

- Korean International School of Bangkok
