= Khlong Kum subdistrict =

Khlong Kum คลองกุ่ม
- Khwaeng
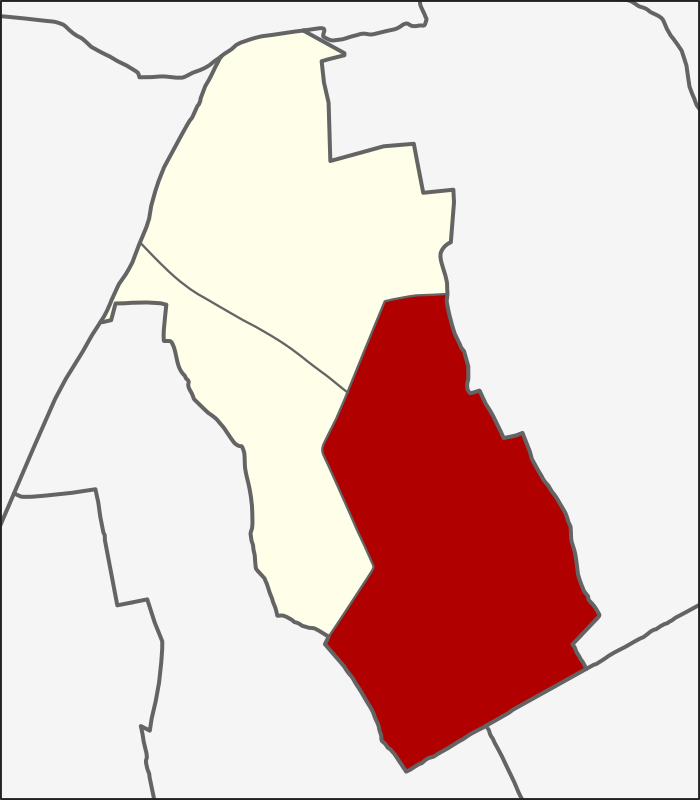
- Location in Bueng Kum District
- Country: Thailand
- Province: Bangkok
- Khet: Bueng Kum

Area
  - Total: 10.811 km^{2} (4.174 sq mi)

Population (2020)
  - Total: 69,071
- Time zone: UTC+7 (ICT)
- TIS 1099: 102701

Khlong Kum (Thai: คลองกุ่ม, pronounced [kʰlɔ̄ːŋ kùm]) is a khwaeng (subdistrict) of Bueng Kum District, in Bangkok, Thailand. In 2020, it had a total population of 69,071 people.
