= Lat Phrao subdistrict =

Lat Phrao ลาดพร้าว
- Khwaeng
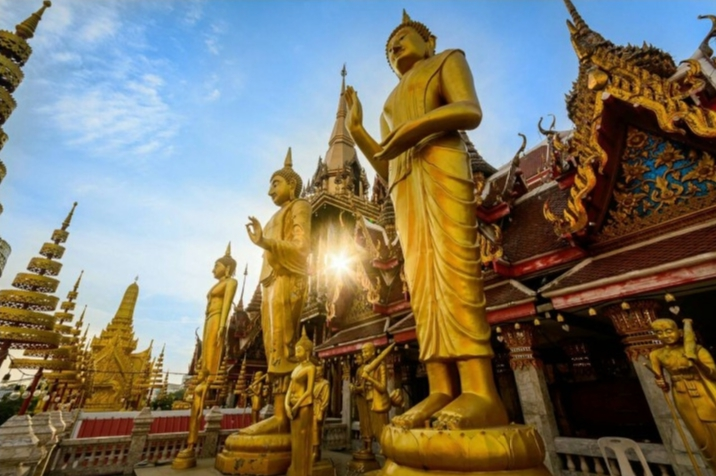
- Wat Lat Phrao temple

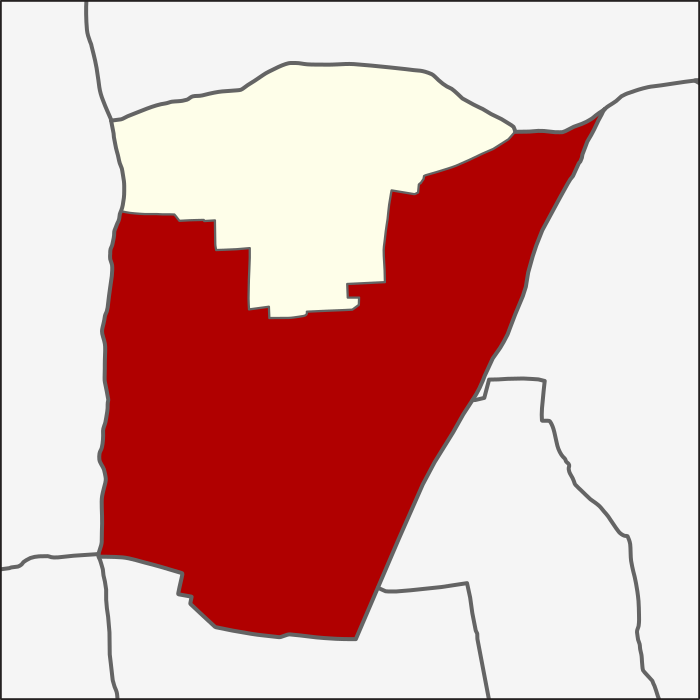
- Location in Lat Phrao district
- Country: Thailand
- Province: Bangkok
- Khet: Lat Phrao

Area
  - Total: 15.102 km^{2} (5.831 sq mi)

Population (2021)
  - Total: 89,135
  - Density: 5,902.2/km^{2} (15,287/sq mi)
- Time zone: UTC+7 (ICT)
- Postal code: 103801
- TIS 1099: 10400

Lat Phrao (Thai: ลาดพร้าว, pronounced [lâːt pʰráːw]) is a khwaeng (subdistrict) of Lat Phrao district, Bangkok.

== Overview ==
Lat Phrao is the northeastern residential area is best characterized by the long, a number of the narrow roads such as Pradit Manutham, Chok Chai 4, Sukhonthasawat, Lat Pla Khao, Nak Niwat that spread out into over a hundred sois (alleys), each of them boasting tangles of sub-sois and communities of its own.

Its name is called after Khlong Lat Phrao, a khlong (canal) that flows through area to the eastern suburbs. The canal is also the boundary line between administrative area and neighbouring districts.

== Geography ==
Lat Phrao is the southern part of the district. The adjoining subdistricts are (from the north clockwise): Chorakhe Bua in its district, Tha Raeng in Bang Khen district, Nuan Chan in Bueng Kum district, Khlong Chan in Bang Kapi district, Khlong Chaokhun Sing and Saphan Song in Wang Thonglang district, Sam Sen Nok in Huai Khwang district, Chan Kasem and Sena Nikhom in Chatuchak district.
