= Lat Phrao =

Lat Phrao may refer to the following geographical features in Bangkok:

- Lat Phrao district
- Lat Phrao subdistrict
- Lat Phrao Intersection
- Lat Phrao MRT station
- Lat Phrao Road
