= Soi Chok Chai 4 =

Street in Bangkok, Thailand

Coordinates: 13.810124°N 100.596245°E

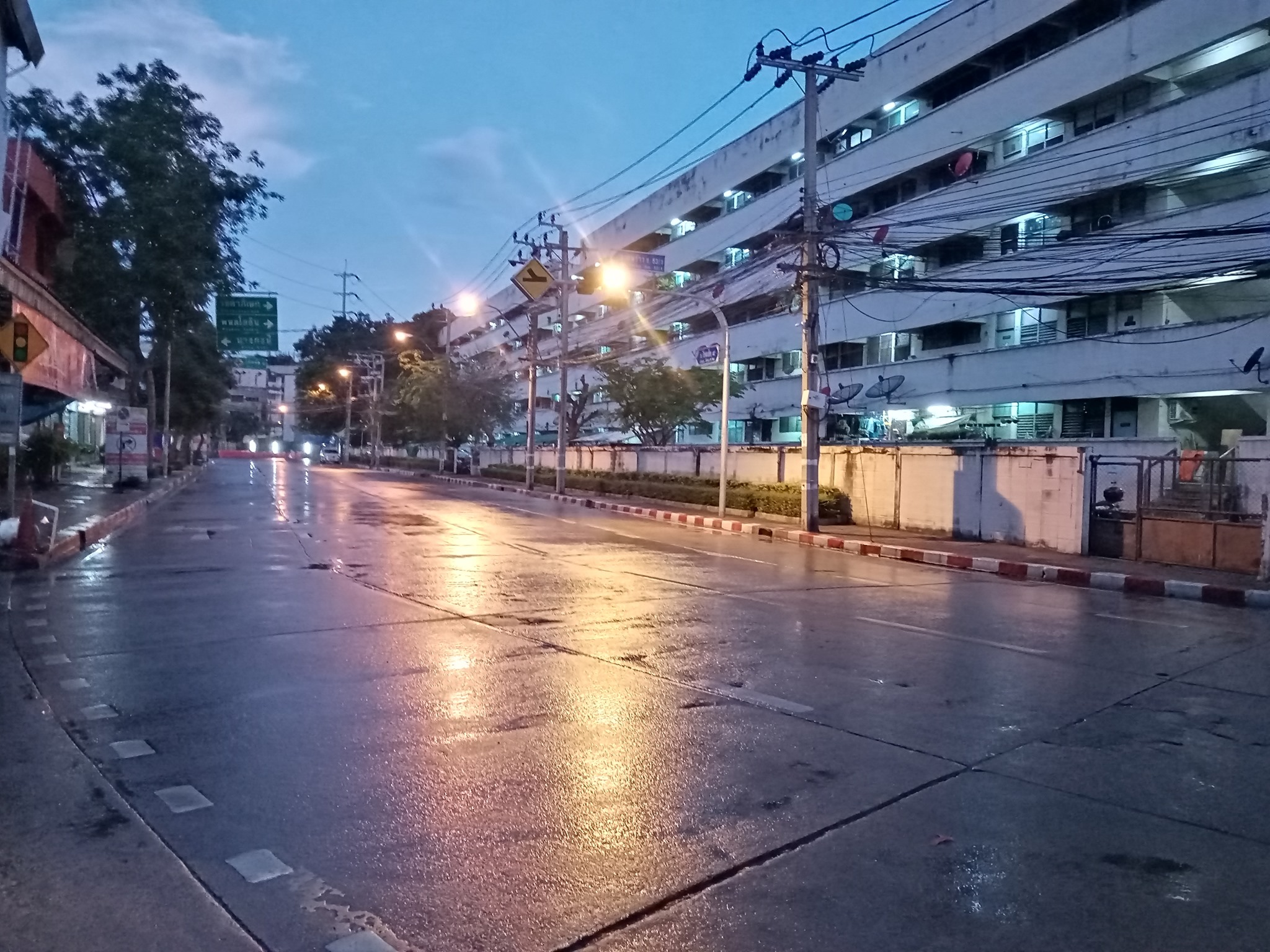
Soi Chok Chai 4 at the beginning of the street at dawn; on the right are the police flats.

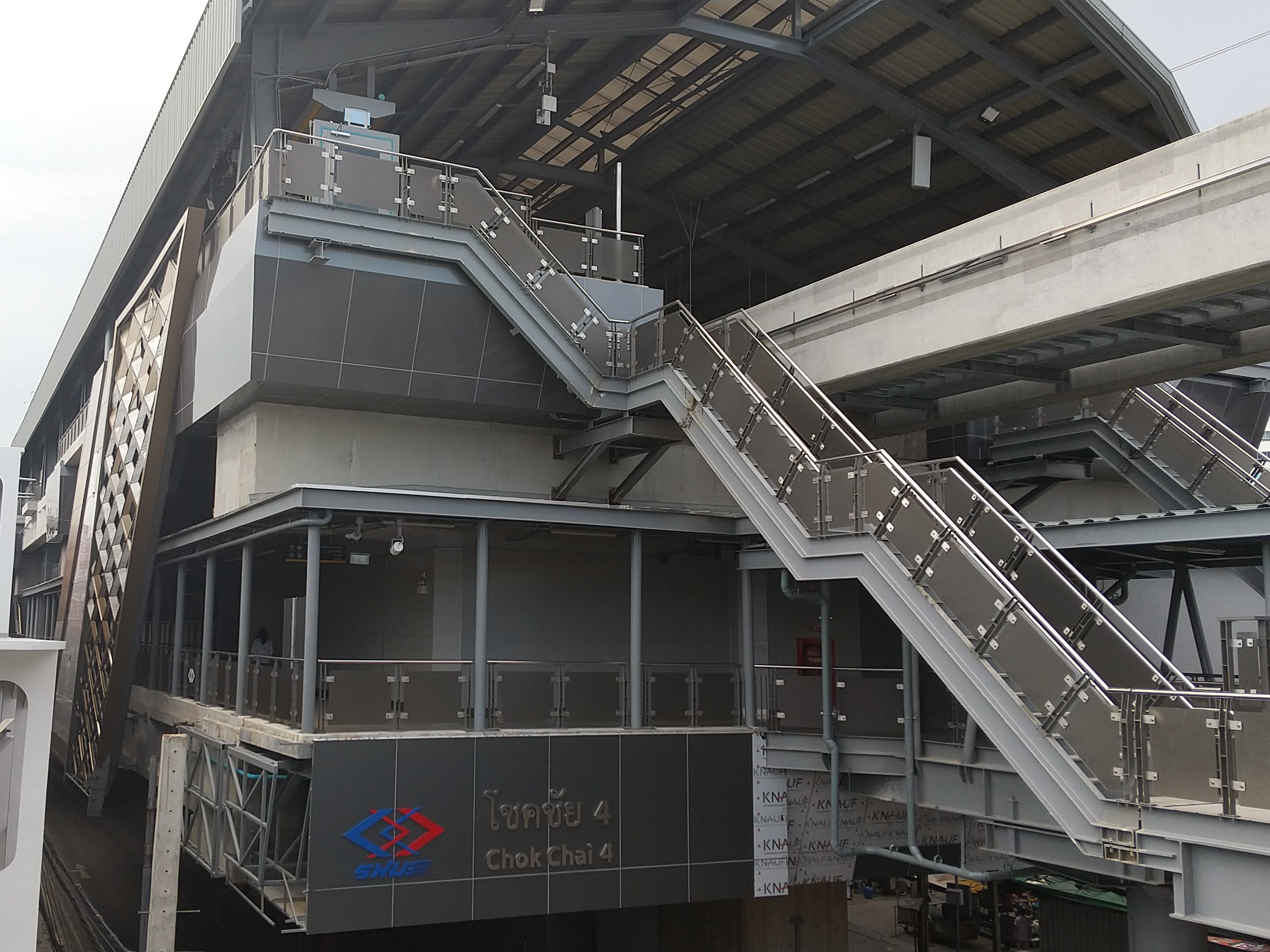
Chok Chai 4 Station.

Soi Chok Chai 4 (Thai: ซอยโชคชัย 4, pronounced [sɔːj t͡ɕʰôːk t͡ɕʰaj sìː]), officially known as Soi Lat Phrao 53 (ซอยลาดพร้าว 53, [sɔːj lâːt pʰráːw hâː sìp sǎːm]) or Chok Chai 4 Road (ถนนโชคชัย 4, [tʰā.nǒn t͡ɕʰôːk t͡ɕʰaj sìː]) is a soi-like street branching off the outbound side of Lat Phrao Road. The area spans across Wang Thonglang and Lat Phrao districts in Bangkok. The Chok Chai 4 neighbourhood is considered one of the most densely populated and bustling zones along Lat Phrao Road.

The street also serves as a shortcut connecting to other main roads, such as Prasert Manukit, Pradit Manutham, and Lat Phrao Wang Hin.

It starts at the junction with Lat Phrao Road in the Saphan Song subdistrict, Wang Thonglang district, heading east and north. It crosses Songkhom Songkhro Road, passes over Khlong Song Krathiam, and enters the Lat Phrao subdistrict in Lat Phrao district. It then intersects with Lat Phrao Wang Hin Road and Satriwitthaya 2 Road, crosses Khlong Suea Noi, and upon reaching the entrance of Soi Chok Chai 4, Soi 84, it turns westward. The road then ends at the Bo Pla intersection, which connects with Lat Phrao Wang Hin Road and Soi Lat Phrao Wang Hin 79, with a total length of approximately 4 km (2.5 mi).

The area at the beginning of the street is a highly vibrant and bustling neighbourhood, home to Chok Chai 4 Market, as well as Chok Chai Police Station and nearby police flats. In 2023, the Yellow Line monorail system was completed and opened for service, with Chok Chai 4 Station located in this area. In the past, this area consisted mainly of open fields and Colocasia weed wetlands. It gradually developed into a residential community and living district, featuring shophouses and various local businesses along the street. In addition, Soi Chok Chai 4, Soi 39 is also home to the Guan Yin Shrine, which was established in 1983. It houses a revered statue of the Thousand-Armed Guan Yin, serving as an important place of worship in the community.
