= Lat Pla Khao Road =

Street in Bangkok, Thailand

Coordinates: 13°51′50.8″N 100°36′51.7″E

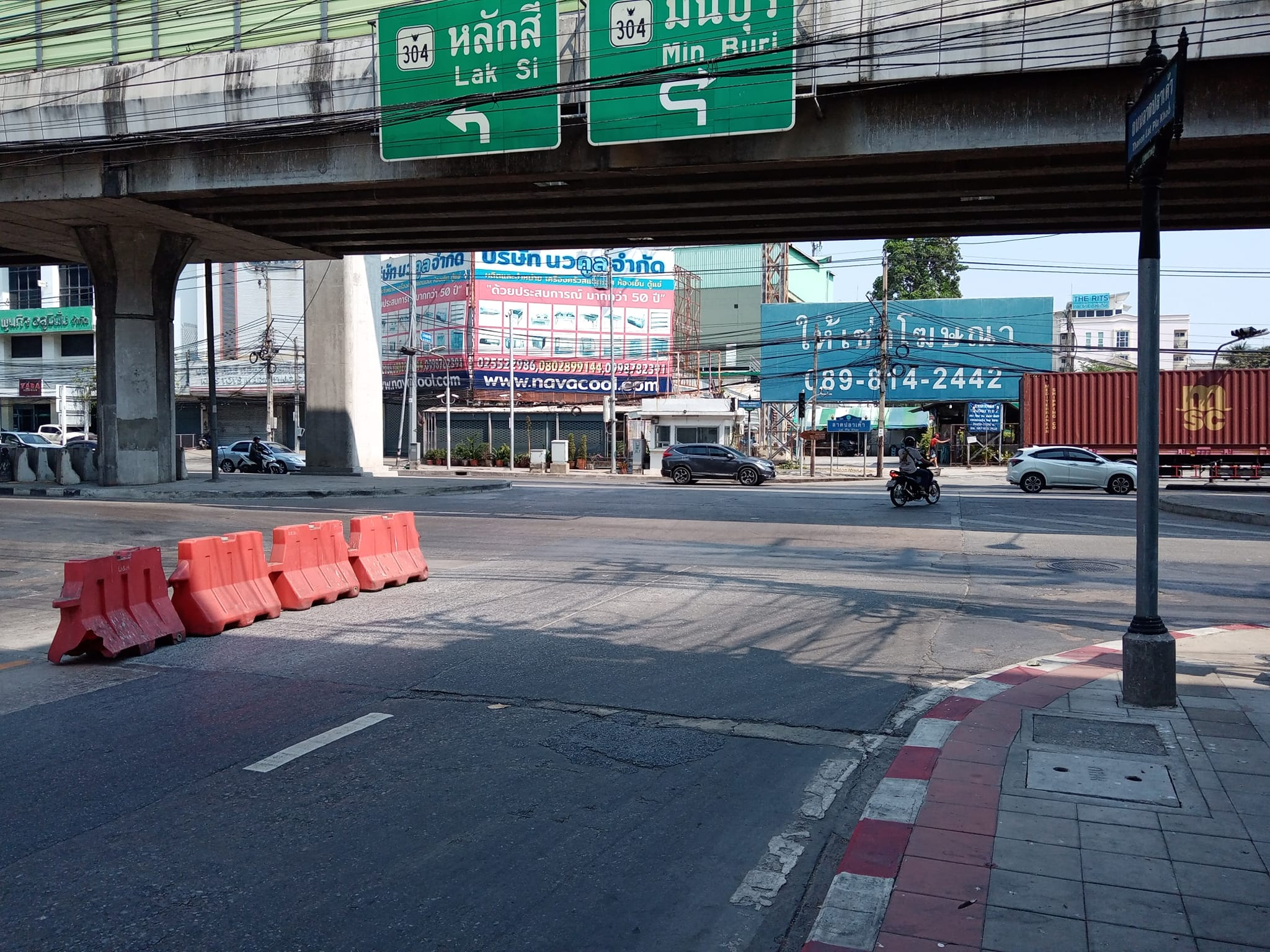
Lat Pla Khao Junction, T-junction where Lat Pla Khao Road meets Highway 304, also widely known as Ram Intra Road

Lat Pla Khao Road (Thai: ถนนลาดปลาเค้า, pronounced [tʰā.nǒn lâːt.plāː.kháo]) is a road in the form of a soi (alley) in Bangkok. It is regarded as a minor road that connects several major roads, such as Chok Chai 4, Prasoet Manukit, and Ram Inthra. Its name has also come to refer to the surrounding neighbourhood.

Lat Pla Khao Road begins in Lat Phrao District as a continuation of Lat Phrao Wang Hin Road at Wang Hin Intersection, where it meets Sena Nikhom 1 Road. From there, it runs northward with a slight curve to the east, entering the Chorakhe Bua area and intersecting with Prasoet Manukit Road. It then heads northeast, bending again in front of Wat Lat Pla Khao temple, before entering Bang Khen District by crossing Khlong Sam Kha canal. The road continues straight until it ends at Lat Pla Khao Junction, where it meets Ram Inthra Road.

The road was originally called "Rap Pla Khao" (ราบปลาเค้า), but the name gradually evolved into "Lat Pla Khao" as it is today. The name refers to the abundance of wallago sheatfish (pla khao in Thai) that once thrived in the area. The road is also commonly known as "Soi Lat Pla Khao" (ซอยลาดปลาเค้า).

An important figure who resides in the Lat Pla Khao neighbourhood is Sudarat Keyuraphan, a prominent female politician and former Minister of Public Health.

Today, the road and neighbourhood are served by Lat Pla Khao Station (PK18) on the MRT Pink Line, which runs above Ram Inthra Road.
