= Chan Kasem =

Subdistrict of Bangkok, Thailand

Chan Kasem จันทรเกษม
- Khwaeng
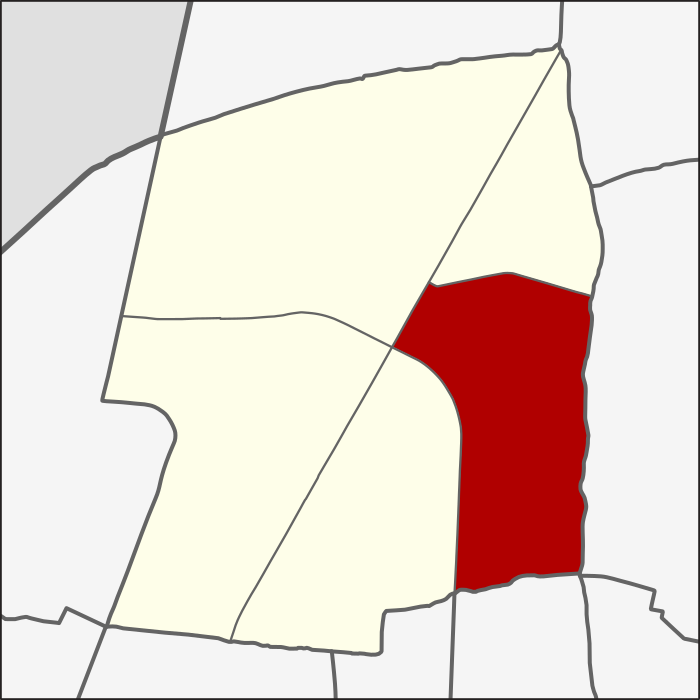
- Location in Chatuchak District
- Country: Thailand
- Province: Bangkok
- Khet: Chatuchak
- Named for: Chandrakasem Rajabhat University

Area
  - Total: 6.026 km^{2} (2.327 sq mi)

Population (2022)
  - Total: 38,080
  - Density: 6,319.28/km^{2} (16,366.9/sq mi)
- Time zone: UTC+7 (ICT)
- Postal code: 10900
- TIS 1099: 103003

Chan Kasem (Thai: จันทรเกษม, pronounced [tɕān kā.sěːm]) is a khwaeng (subdistrict) of Chatuchak district in Bangkok, Thailand.

== History ==
The name Chan Kasem called after a local higher education institution Chandrakasem Rajabhat University.

The area was declared a subdistrict in late 2003, along with four other subdistricts of Chatuchak.

== Geography ==
Chan Kasem is the eastern part of the district.

Adjoining subdistricts are, from the north clockwise: Sena Nikhom in its district (Sena Nikhom 1 Road is a boundary), Lat Phrao of Lat Phrao district (Khlong Bang Bua and Khlong Lat Pharo are the boundaries), Sam Sen Nok of Huai Khwang district (Khlong Nam Kaew is a boundary), and Chomphon and ChaTuchak in its district (Ratchadaphisek and Phaholyothin Roads are the boundaries), respectively.

== Places ==
- Chandrakasem Rajabhat University
- Military Technical Training School
- Department of Export Promotion
