= Sena Nikhom =

Sena Nikhom เสนานิคม
- Khwaeng
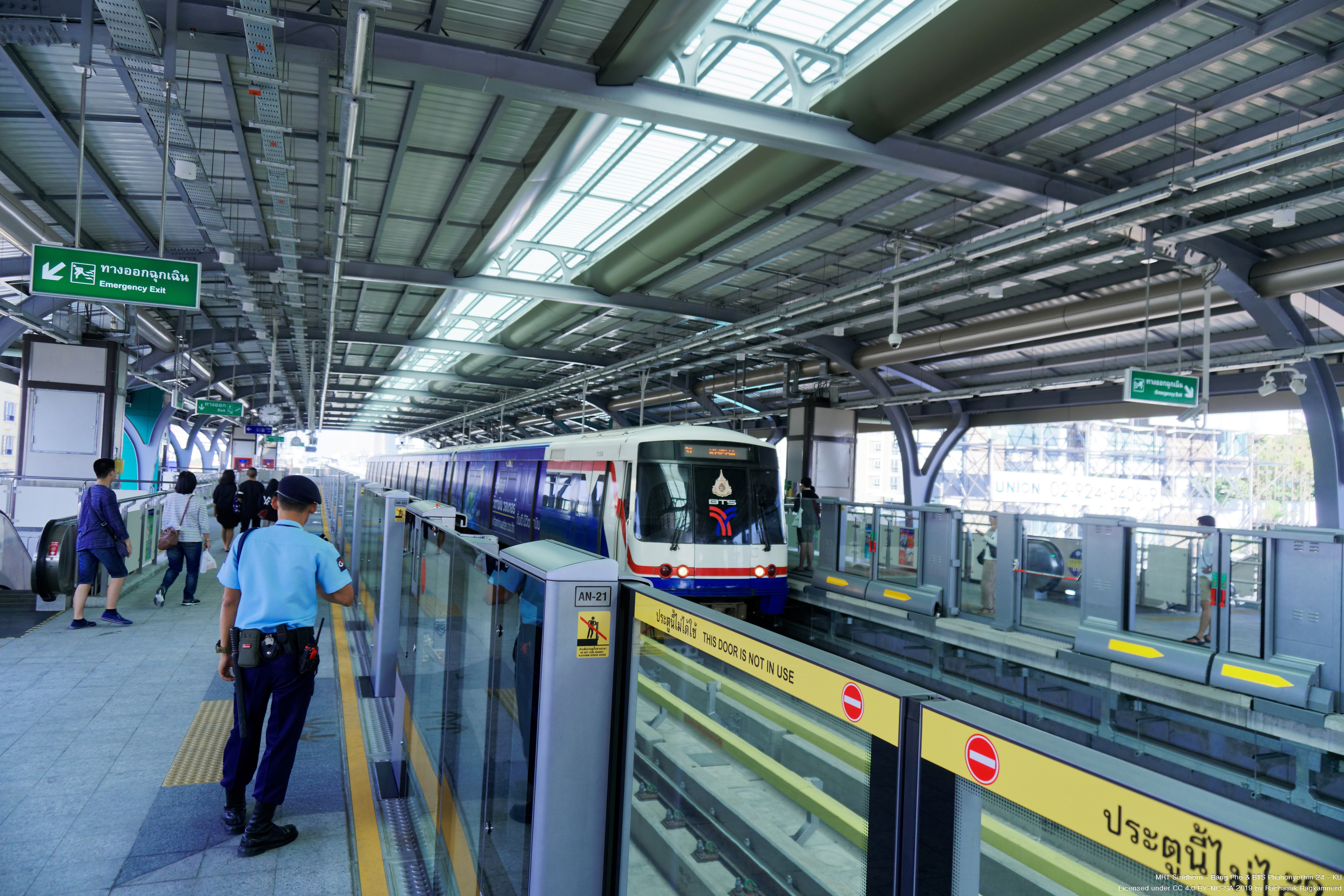
- BTS Skytrain approaching platform of Sena Nikhom BTS Station (Sena Nikhom side)

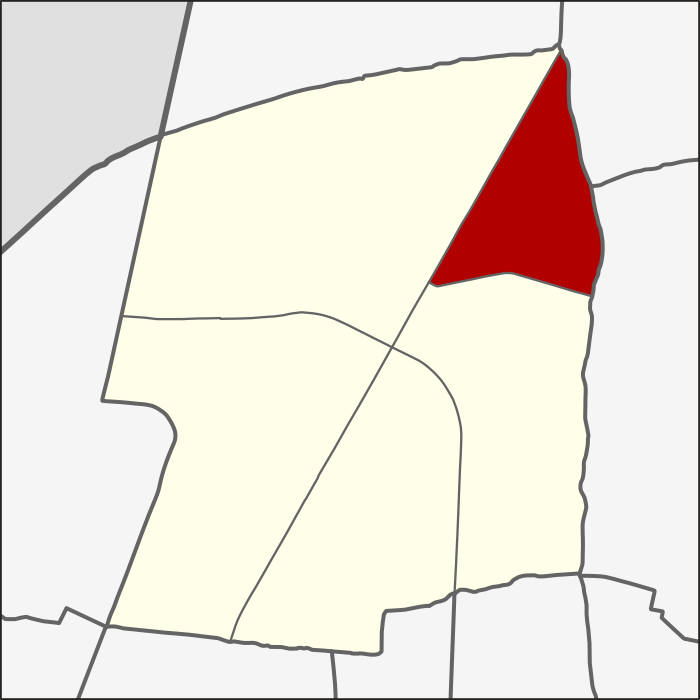
- Location in Chatuchak District
- Country: Thailand
- Province: Bangkok
- Khet: Chatuchak
- Named for: Sena Nikhom Junction

Area
  - Total: 2.826 km^{2} (1.091 sq mi)

Population (2022)
  - Total: 20,393
  - Density: 7,216.21/km^{2} (18,689.9/sq mi)
- Time zone: UTC+7 (ICT)
- Postal code: 10900
- TIS 1099: 103002

Sena Nikhom (Thai: เสนานิคม, pronounced [sěː.nāː ní(ʔ).kʰōm]) is a khwaeng (subdistrict) of Chatuchak district, Bangkok. It is a densely populated area and filled with many different types of residential houses.

== History ==
Its name Sena Nikhom comes from the same name intersection. It is a T junction of Phaholyothin Road (Highway 1) and Sena Nikhom 1 Road (Note: While Sena Nikhom 2 Road is Soi Phaholyothin 34.), better known as Soi Sena Nikhom.

Sena Nikhom was declared a subdistrict in late 2003, along with four other subdistricts of Chatuchak.

== Geography ==
Sena Nikhom is considered an area on the northeastern side of the district.

Other subdistricts surround it include (from the north clockwise): Anusawari in Bang Khen district (Khlong Bang Bua is a boundary), Chorakhe Bua and Lat Phrao in Lat Phrao district (Khlong Bang Bua is a boundary), Chan Kasem in its district (Sena Nikhom 1 Road is a boundary), Lat Yao in its district (Phaholyothin Road is a boundary).

== Places ==
- Sena Nikhom BTS Station (share with Lat Yao)
- Bang Khen Market
- Paolo Kaset Hospital (formerly Mayo Hospital)
- Sripatum University
- RTA Chemical Department
