= Chorakhe Bua =

Chorakhe Bua จรเข้บัว
- Khwaeng
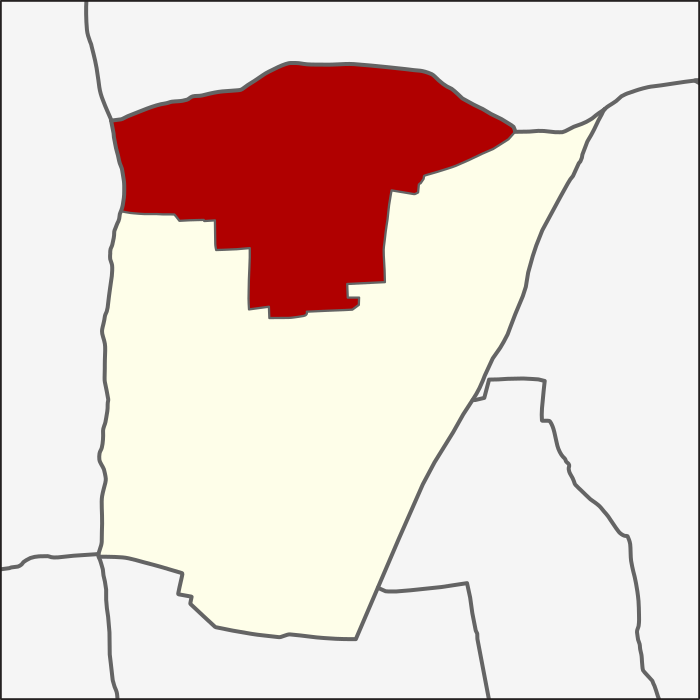
- Location in Lat Phrao district
- Country: Thailand
- Province: Bangkok
- Khet: Lat Phrao

Area
  - Total: 7.055 km^{2} (2.724 sq mi)

Population (2021)
  - Total: 26,467
  - Density: 3,751.52/km^{2} (9,716.4/sq mi)
- Time zone: UTC+7 (ICT)
- Postal code: 10400
- TIS 1099: 103802

Chorakhe Bua (Thai: จรเข้บัว, pronounced [t͡ɕɔ̄ː.rā.kʰêː būa̯]) is a neighbourhood in east Bangkok. It roughly occupies the area of the khwaeng (subdistrict) of the same name in Lat Phrao district.

== History ==
Originally, the area of Chorakhe Bua was very spacious. It covers parts of Bang Kapi, Bang Khen and Khan Na Yao Districts today. In 1997, two parts of Chorakhe Bua switched to Bang Khen District.

== Geography ==
Chorakhe Bua is the northern part of the district. Its adjoining subdistricts, clockwise from the north, are Anusawari and Tha Raeng in Bang Khen District, Lat Phrao in its district, and Sena Nikhom in Chatuchak District.

== Transportation ==
- Lat Pla Khao Road
- Prasoet Manukit Road (Highway 351)
