= Panward Hemmanee =

Thai actress and model

- ปานวาด เหมมณี
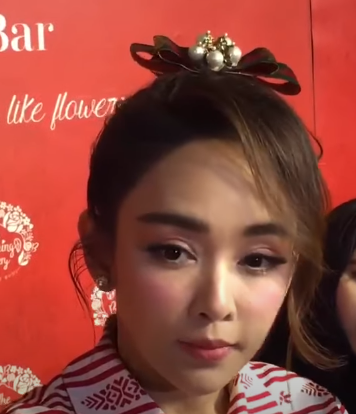
- Panward in September 2019
- Born: 28 December 1979 (age 46); Betong, Yala, Thailand
- Other name: Pei (เป้ย)
- Education: Chandrakasem Rajabhat University
- Occupations: Actress; model
- Years active: 2001–present
- Known for: Cherry in Songkram Nang Fah; Jitree in Dok Rak Rim Tang; Salisa in Marital Justice
- Spouse: Nithi Boonyaratglin (m. 2012; div. 2024)
- Children: 2

Panward Hemmanee (Thai: ปานวาด เหมมณี; born 28 December 1979), nicknamed Pei (Thai: เป้ย), is a Thai-Chinese actress and model. She is best known for her villainous roles in various Thai lakorns, including as Cherry in Songkram Nang Fah (2008) and as Salisa in Marital Justice (2024).

== Early life and education ==
Panward was born on December 28, 1979 in Betong district, Yala province, Thailand. She is the daughter of Wutthiwech Hemmanee and Suwanna Mongkolprajak. Her parents separated before she was born.

She completed her secondary education at Betong Wiraratprasan School, then she graduated with a bachelor's degree from the Faculty of Fine Arts, Chandrakasem Rajabhat University.

== Career ==
Panward entered the entertainment industry after placing 2nd runner up in the Dutchie Boys & Girls contest in 2001. She made her television debut as Marati in the Channel 3's lakorn Surayan Chandra (2002). She later took on her first antagonistic role in the 2005 lakorn Plerng Payu as the supporting character Pimphaka.

Panward gained significant recognition for her villainous roles, most notably in the 2008 television series Songkram Nang Fah, where she portrayed Cherry, an ambitious flight attendant who serves as the primary antagonist to the female protagonist.

Following her role in Songkram Nang Fah, she appeared frequently as an antagonist in Thai television throughout the late 2000s and early 2010s. During this period, she worked regularly on productions for major networks, including Channel 5, Channel 7 and Channel 3. In addition to television series, she appeared in the supernatural comedy-horror film Haunting Me (2007) and in the 2008 American action thriller film Bangkok Dangerous (2008) alongside Nicolas Cage. She later went on to play various roles in several television series and films, including as Jitree in the 2010 lakorn Dok Rak Rim Tang, for which she received a TV Inside Hot Award for Hot Villainess of the Year nomination in 2010.

In 2012, Panward began a hiatus from the entertainment industry to focus on her personal life and family. She remained largely absent from television and film for nine years until her return to acting in 2021. She returned to the screen in the One 31's drama Love and Fortune (2021) and To Sir, With Love (2022). In the latter, she portrayed the character Jan, taking over the role following the death of Nida Patcharaveerapong (Tangmo).

Since her return, she has continued to take on roles in various television series. She gained wider recognition for her performance as Salisa in the drama Marital Justice (2024), and as Jittrawadi (Indrasuren) in the historical drama The Empress of Ayodhaya (2024), portraying a chief consort from a foreign kingdom driven by jealousy and ambition to scheme for the position of queen consort.

== Personal life ==
=== Marriage ===
Panward married Lieutenant Commander Nithi Boonyaratglin, son of General Sonthi Boonyaratglin, in an Islamic ceremony on April 28, 2012, at the Swissôtel Nai Lert Park Hotel. The marriage followed an eight-month courtship, and a wedding reception was held on June 2 at the Plaza Athenee Hotel. Upon her marriage, she converted to Islam and adopted the religious name Nur'aina. The couple has two children: a son, Atsadin Boonyaratglin (Prod), and a daughter, Palin Boonyaratglin (Pran). However, Panward confirmed that the couple had officially divorced in 2024, though they continue to co-parent their children. After the divorce, Panward converted back to Buddhism.

== Filmography ==
=== Movies ===
Year	Title	Notes	Ref.
2007	Haunting Me	Num Ning	
2008	Bangkok Dangerous	Aom	
2009	Haunted Universities	Muay	
2010	Sam Yan	Tukky	
2010	Saranae Hen Phi	Daoruang	

=== Television series ===
Year	Title	Role	Network	Ref.
2002	Surayan Chandra	Marati	Channel 3	
2002	Krai Kam Nod	Khun Paew	Channel 7	
2003	Mueng Dala	guest	Channel 7	
2003	So Sanaeha	Tuenta	Channel 7	
2004	Pleang Paa Fah Lom Dao	Tipsri	Channel 7	
2005	Seub Sao Rao Ruk	Lukkai	Channel 7	
2005	Plerng Payu	Pimphaka	Channel 7	
2005	Khun Nhoo Dok Fah Kah Maew Kang Baan	Rasmiprapa	Channel 7	
2005	Yuttakarn Khao Bua	An	Channel 5	
2005	Khun Chai Transistor	Royput's friend	Channel 3	
2006	Roy Adeet Haeng Rak	Anchalee	Channel 5	
2007	Ngeun Rissaya	Kara	Channel 7	
2007	Dok Fah Ya Jai	Vicky	Channel 7	
2007	La-ong Dao	Honey	Channel 5	
2008	Ngeun Rissaya	Rayathip	Channel 7	
2008	Songkram Nang Fah	Cherry	Channel 5	
2008	Shadow of the Ashoka Tree	Wiyada	Channel 5	
2008	Kwam Lab Khong Superstar	Pei	Channel 5	
2009	Sut Saneha	Ming Durarat Utsanee	Channel 3	
2009	Daddy Duo	Kathy	Channel 9	
2010	Rong Raem Pee	Cherdchom	Channel 5	
2010	Dok Rak Rim Tang	Jitree	Channel 5	
2010	Traa Barb See Kaw	Kham Euey / Orathip	Channel 5	
2011	Viva Hahe	Annie	Channel 7	
2011	Mia Mai Chai Mia	Saysawat	Channel 5	
2012	Nam Kuen Hai Reab Ruk	Baby	Channel 5	
2012	Nang Sing Sabad Chor	Muay Yai	Channel 5	
2012	Rajini Luk Thung	Chamada	Channel 8	
2021	Love and Fortune	Euang	One 31	
2022	To Sir, With Love	Jan	One 31	
2023	Club Friday Moments & Memories: Love Begins	Chayanut	One 31	
2024	Marital Justice	Salisa	One 31	
2024	The Empress of Ayodhaya	Jittrawadi / Indrasuren	One 31	
2025	Club Friday Theory of Love: The Gift of Love	Rosie	One 31	
2025	Jet Lag	guest	One 31	
2025	The Idol Game	Anna	Channel 3	

=== Television show ===
Year	Title	Network	Notes	Ref.
2006	Bang Rak Soi 9	Channel 9	Maliwan (Guest, Ep. Because I'm Lonely)	
2006	Raberd Terd Terng	Channel 5	Masaya (Guest, Ep. The Mermaid)	
2006	Pen Tor	Channel 3	Kung (Guest)	
2009	Baan Nee Mee Ruk	Channel 9	Guest	

=== Music video appearances ===
Year	Title	Artist	Ref.
2005	"ผู้หญิงกลางคืน"	Golf Kritin	
2006	"คนใจง่าย"	Ice Sarunyu	
2009	"หลอกฝัน"	Kloem	
2009	"ชุดดำ"	Kloem	
2009	"หมดอารมณ์"	Prikthai	

== Awards and nominations ==
Year	Award	Category	Work	Result	Ref.
2008	Siam Dara Stars Party	The Most Charming Villain	Songkram Nang Fah	Nominated	
2008	Top Awards	Best Supporting Actress	Songkram Nang Fah	Nominated	
2010	Siam Dara Stars Awards	Sexy Star Award	—N/a	Won	
2010	TV Inside Hot Awards	Hot Villainess of the Year	Dok Rak Rim Tang	Nominated	
2010	TV Inside Hot Awards	Sexiest Woman of the Year	—N/a	Nominated	
2023	6th Nakarat Awards	Best Supporting Actress	To Sir, With Love	Won	
