= 3202 =

3202 may refer to:

- 3202 Graff asteroid
- 3202 Woolworth Avenue address of the Gerald R. Ford Birthsite and Gardens
- Hirth 3202 two stroke aircraft engine
- Nord 3202 aircraft
- Thailand Route 3202
- The year in the 33rd century
