= Bangkok Dangerous (2008 film) =

2008 American action thriller film

- Theatrical release poster
- Directed by: Pang Brothers
- Written by: Pang Brothers
- Based on: Bangkok Dangerous by Pang Brothers
- Produced by: Nicolas Cage; Norman Golightly; William Sherak; Jason Shuman
- Starring: Nicolas Cage; Charlie Yeung; Shahkrit Yamnarm; Panward Hemmanee
- Cinematography: Decha Srimantra
- Edited by: Mike Jackson; Curran Pang
- Music by: Brian Tyler
- Production companies: Blue Star Entertainment; Saturn Films
- Distributed by: Lionsgate; Initial Entertainment Group; Virtual Studios
- Release date: September 5, 2008
- Running time: 100 minutes
- Country: United States
- Languages: English; Thai
- Budget: $45 million
- Box office: $42.5 million

Bangkok Dangerous is a 2008 American action thriller film written and directed by the Pang Brothers, and starring Nicolas Cage. It is a remake of the Pangs' 1999 debut Bangkok Dangerous, a Thai film, for which Cage's production company, Saturn Films, purchased the remake rights.

Known by its working title, Big Hit in Bangkok, and also as Time to Kill, it began filming in Bangkok in August 2006. The film was financed by Initial Entertainment Group, and Lionsgate Films acquired its North America distribution rights.

Bangkok Dangerous was released on September 5, 2008. It received negative reviews and grossed $42.5 million.

== Plot ==
Joe is a professional freelance contract killer who works strictly by the rules: never socializing outside his work, staying secluded in quiet spots, never interacting or meeting with his handlers and always leaving on time without a trace. He uses multiple aliases and usually hires small-time criminals such as, but not limited to young pickpockets who can speak some English, as his local help and middlemen between him and his handlers, always murdering them the end of the job to prevent any identification. He also carries a watch to perform a hit in specific time and correctly visualizes his every target.

After completing a hit in Prague and killing his help there, Joe travels to Bangkok for an assignment to assassinate four people for notorious Bangkok crime boss Surat, whom he never meets. Joe occasionally provides insight via voiceover narration throughout the film. He hires a local Thai pickpocket named Kong as his go-between in Bangkok, a condition of the contract being that the gang will never meet Joe. Joe keeps Kong on a strict Don't-Stop-For-Anything rule. Contracts from the Bangkok gangsters are passed to Kong one by one via a nightclub dancer, Aom. Joe's first execution in Bangkok is done on motorcycle; when the target car stops at a red light, Joe kills all the occupants with a MAC-11.

Kong retrieves information about the second target, again via Aom, and the pair become friendlier with every contact. Before Joe executes his mission, Kong informs him of the target, Pramod Juntasa, another notorious gang lord and Surat's rival crime boss who acts as a sex trafficker, buying young girls from impoverished parents and selling them for sex. Joe sneaks into the target's penthouse and drowns him in his pool. Unsatisfied with Kong's assistance, Joe contemplates killing him, but abandons this idea after witnessing a bruised Kong return, having been ambushed small-time thugs over a briefcase containing information files of Surat's/Joe's targets; Joe takes Kong under his wing and becomes his mentor, training him with defensive techniques.

Midway, Joe meets Fon, a deaf-mute pharmacist, with whom he becomes intrigued after a brief consultation. Joe later returns to the pharmacy to invite Fon out for dinner. Soon after Joe falls for Fon and meets her mother, the affair is cut short when he shoots and kills two armed muggers in Fon's presence. Blood splatters on Fon, and she runs off, trembling and traumatized by the violent deaths. Feeling betrayed, Fon cannot forgive Joe and ends their relationship.

Before the third kill, the gang attempts to identify Joe but fail to track him, and Joe warns Surat never to follow him. For the third execution that takes place at the Damnoen Saduak floating market, Kong assists Joe. The kill does not go as planned, and the target, a playboy and a criminal underworld associate, nearly gets away but Joe manages to catch and assassinate him. Before beginning his last mission Joe visits Fon, presumably to say goodbye. She initially ignores him but as Joe begins to drive away, she runs after his car.

His fourth target is the Prime Minister of Thailand, who is revered by many but a great hindrance to Surat due to his hard-line crackdown on organized crime. Joe is about to make the kill when he has second thoughts, is spotted and escapes through a panicking crowd. Meanwhile, the gang has abducted Aom and Kong and Surat threatened Aom in exchange for Joe's location. Joe, now a target, is attacked at his house by four of Surat's henchmen. He uses explosives to take them out and is faced with the choice of rescuing Kong or leaving the country unharmed. Joe decides to rescue Kong, so he sets off to the gang's headquarters with one of the half-alive attackers.

Joe goes to the gang's headquarters, kills most of the gang including Surat's underboss/bodyguard (who is blown into half by explosives), and saves Kong and Aom. The fearful gang leader flees to his car with three other accomplices. Joe spots him and shoots the gang members, then gets into the back seat with Surat. As the police arrive at the location, Joe realizes he has only one bullet. He puts his head adjacent to Surat's, puts the gun up to his temple and pulls the trigger, killing himself and Surat.

=== Alternative ending ===
An alternative to the theatrical version depicts Joe about to kill himself when he sees Kong hijacking a police car and coming to his rescue. He kills Surat and runs to the stolen car (although he is shot once in the arm). The duo manage to elude the authorities and hide in a neighborhood a few blocks away from Surat's headquarters. As locals come out to investigate the commotion, Kong reveals Joe as Surat's killer. They help him recuperate while one local mentions Surat's reputation, adding that his death should mark an end to his crimes and atrocities in their community. Kong then takes Joe to a boatman the next day and gives him his passports, so he may flee the country. Joe thanks Kong for his assistance and gives him a bank account number with "a bonus", calling him a good student. Joe then departs, with the camera focused on Kong (from Joe's perspective, similar to the original ending).

== Cast ==
- Nicolas Cage as Joe
- Shahkrit Yamnarm as Kong
- James Wearing Smith as Chicago
- Charlie Yeung as Fon
- Nirattisai Kaljaruek as Surat
- Panward Hemmanee as Aom
- Peter Shadrin as Anton
- Dom Hetrakul as Aran
- Napassakorn Midaim as Kong's Brother

== Production ==
The original film's main character is a deaf hitman, whose disability makes him a fearless, unflinching gunman. That character has been changed in the remake. "We'd like to keep him the same, but we understand that from a marketing point of view Nic needs to have some lines," Oxide was quoted as saying in The New York Times. "So what we’re going to do is transform his girlfriend instead into a deaf-mute. This switch will maintain the drama of communication between the two main characters."

The Soi Cowboy entertainment district was among Thai locations used for filming.

== Release ==
=== Box office ===
The film grossed US$42.5 million, of which $15.3 million was from the US. The film grossed US$7.8 million on its opening weekend, making it the first film since Dickie Roberts: Former Child Star to debut at number 1 with such a low gross. Lionsgate distribution topper Steve Rothenberg said, "It will be a nicely profitable film for us." The film's budget was $45 million.

=== Home media release ===
Bangkok Dangerous was released on DVD and Blu-ray on January 6, 2009. As of December 1, 2009, 760,178 units have been sold, gathering US$15,058,164 in revenue.

== Reception ==
On the review aggregator website Rotten Tomatoes, 9% of 92 critics' reviews are positive, with an average rating of 3.4/10. The website's consensus reads: "With murky cinematography, a meandering pace, a dull storyline, and rather wooden performances, The Pang Brothers' Hollywood remake of Bangkok Dangerous is unsuccessful." Metacritic, which uses a weighted average, assigned the film a score of 24 out of 100, based on 16 critics, indicating "generally unfavorable" reviews. Audiences polled by CinemaScore gave the film an average grade of "C-" on an A+ to F scale.

== See also ==
- List of films featuring the deaf and hard of hearing
