= Haunting Me (film) =

2007 Thai horror-comedy film directed by Poj Arnon

- Theatrical release poster
- Directed by: Poj Arnon
- Written by: Poj Arnon; Thammanoon Sukulboontanom
- Produced by: Poj Arnon; Kiatkamon Iamphungporn; Tipwarin Nildum; Aphiradee Iamphungporn
- Starring: Jaturong Mokjok; Sukonthawa Koetnimit; Ekkachai Srivichai; Yingsak Chonglertjetsadawong; Kohtee Aramboy
- Cinematography: Panya Nimchareonpong
- Edited by: Sunit Asavinikul; Muanfun Uppatham
- Music by: Giant Wave
- Distributed by: Five Star Production
- Release date: 8 March 2007
- Running time: 91 minutes
- Country: Thailand
- Language: Thai

Haunting Me (Thai: หอแต๋วแตก; Hor Taew Taek) is a 2007 Thai supernatural comedy-horror film directed by Poj Arnon.

== Synopsis ==
Jay-Taew, Cartoon, Mot-dum, and Songkram are four aging katoey who run a boarding house for boys in provincial Thailand. After helping cover up the mysterious deaths of local teens "Pancake" and Num-Ning, the teens' spirits haunt the dormitory, forcing the girls to try all sorts of crazy schemes to get rid of the ghosts. Eventually, they realize that the only way to do this is to help the ghosts to avenge their deaths.

== Cast ==
- Jaturong Mokjok as Jay-Taew
- Sukonthawa Koetnimit as Khaao Tuu
- Ekkachai Srivichai as Mot-Dum
- Yingsak Chonglertjetsadawong as Cartoon
- Kohtee Aramboy as Pancake
- Panward Hemmanee as Num Ning
- Wiradit Srimalai as Namo
- Ratchanont Suprakob as Gaai
- Thanakorn Jaipinta as Giao
- Sophia La as Mom
- Anna Mokjok as Policewoman
- Somlek Sakdikul as Buckteeth
- Siwawat Sappinyo as Sim
- Chaiwat Thongsaeng as Main

== Sequels ==
- Oh My Ghosts! 2 (หอแต๋วแตก แหวกชิมิ) (Hor Taew Tak 2) (2009)
- Oh My Ghost! 3 (หอแต๋วแตก แหกมว๊ากมว๊ากกก) (Hor Taew Tak 3) (2011)
- Oh My Ghost! 4 (หอแต๋วแตก แหกมว๊ากมว๊ากกก) (Hor Taew Tak 4) (2012)
- Oh My Ghost! 5 (หอแต๋วแตก แหกนะคะ) (Hor Taew Tak 5) (2015)
- Oh My Ghost! 6 The New Gen (หอแต๋วแตก แหกต่อไม่รอแล้วนะ) (2018)
- Oh My Ghost! The Fierce Escape from COVID-19 (หอแต๋วแตก 8 แหกโควิดปังปุริเย่) (2021)
- Oh My Ghost! 10 The Finale (หอแต๋วแตก แหกสัปะหยด) (2024)

== Spin-off ==
- Pojaman: The Legacy (พจมาน สว่างคาตา) (2020)
