= Satriwitthaya 2 School =

Coordinates: 13.8310°N 100.6158°E

Satriwitthaya 2 School In the royal patronage of the princess mother, Srinagarindra
- Bangkok; Thailand

Information
- Type: Public school
- Established: 1975
- Director: Dr. Kanyapuk Kanphuwanan
- Grades: 7–12
- Enrollment: 5,333(approx.)
- Colors: White & Red
- Song: Sw2's March
- Website: http://www.sw2.ac.th

Satriwitthaya 2 School In the royal patronage of the princess mother, Srinagarindra (โรงเรียนสตรีวิทยา 2 ในพระราชูปถัมภ์สมเด็จพระศรีนครินทราบรมราชชนนี), with 5333 students, is the most populous high school in Thailand.

== Early days ==
Satriwitthaya 2 School was christened by Her Royal Highness Princess Srinagarindra, the Princess Mother, the patron of the school. Located at 47 Moo 2 Sukhondhasawat Road Lat Phrao District, Bangkok. The school has a total area of 80 Rai 45 wa2, 24 of which was donated by Mrs.Long Waisali (นางหลง ไว้สาลี, 17 from Ms.Soon Panichheng (นางสาวสุ่น พานิชเฮง) and the rest was rented from Rongphrayabarnsong (literally means Monk Hospital) Foundation.

The school was founded by Lady Boonchia Chaiyabhat (คุณหญิงบุญเจือ ไชยภัฏ), a former director of Satriwitthaya School. When the school was founded in 1975, there was just an empty field with no road access. Nevertheless, the first 4 buildings were completed in 1 year. Mrs. Sommhai Aimsombhat (นางสมหมาย เอมสมบัติ) was the first school director.

Satriwitthaya 2 was officially opened on 17 May 1975 by using the sermon hall of Sakornsunprachasun Temple (วัดสาครสุ่นประชาสรรค์) as the temporary classroom. The first group was 277 students and 13 teachers.

== The monument of Princess Srinagarindra ==
In Satriwitthaya 2 School, there is a statue of Princess Srinagarindra, "the Princess Mother”, who was involved in the establishment of the school and named it. This is a sacred and historical place where people can pay respect and worship.

The monument was built by Satriwitthaya 2 School with the assistance of alumni, teachers, the parent association and the education committee. The School invited Princess Srinagarindra's grandchild, Her Royal Highness Princess Maha Chakri Sirindhorn to formally open the statue at a ceremony on January 25, 2002.

The statue is located in the middle of a manmade water feature called Kanchanaphisek which is inside the school near the school gate. This was the place where the Royal Grandmother sat during the opening ceremony event of the ‘Somdet Phra Srinagarindra building’, which is behind the monument in July 1975. On the Kanchanaphisek land, she also planted a pikul tree near the monument, and Sattriwittaya 2 school use this sacred pikul flower as the flower symbol of their school.
