= Khlong Chaokhun Sing =

Khlong Chaokhun Sing คลองเจ้าคุณสิงห์
- Khwaeng
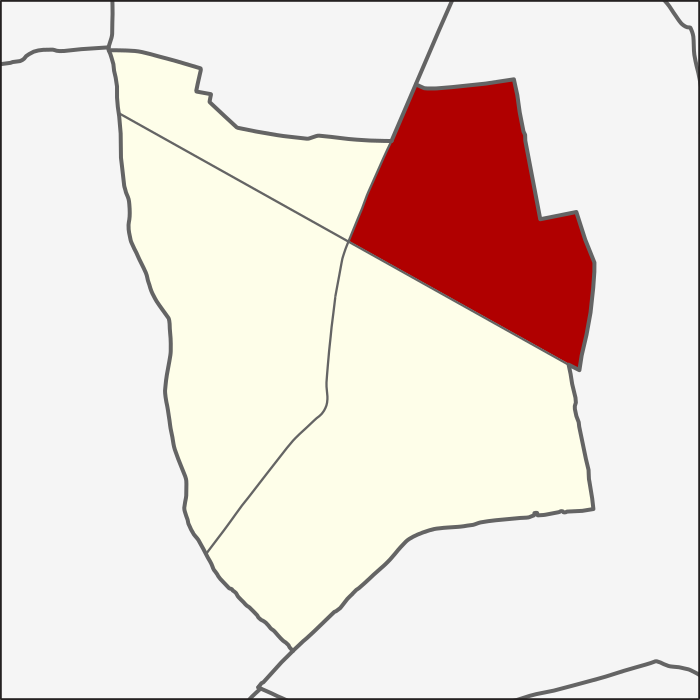
- Location in Wang Thonglang District
- Country: Thailand
- Province: Bangkok
- Khet: Wang Thonglang

Area
  - Total: 4.065 km^{2} (1.570 sq mi)

Population (2023)
  - Total: 26,775
- Time zone: UTC+7 (ICT)
- Postal code: 10310
- TIS 1099: 104503

Khlong Chaokhun Sing (Thai: คลองเจ้าคุณสิงห์, pronounced [kʰlɔ̄ːŋ t͡ɕaːw.kʰun sǐŋ]) is a khwaeng (subdistrict) of Wang Thonglang District, in Bangkok, Thailand. In 2023, it had a total population of 26,775 people.
