= Bangkok Love Story =

- The Thai theatrical release poster.
- Directed by: Poj Arnon
- Written by: Poj Arnon
- Produced by: Poj Arnon
- Starring: Rattaballung Tohssawat; Chaiwat Thongsaeng
- Cinematography: Tiwa Moeithaisong
- Edited by: Tiwa Moeithaisong
- Music by: Giantwave
- Distributed by: Sahamongkol Film International
- Release date: 13 September 2007
- Running time: 105 minutes
- Country: Thailand
- Language: Thai

Bangkok Love Story (Thai: เพื่อน...กูรักมึงว่ะ; RTGS: Phuean...Ku Rak Mueng Wa; literally "Friend ... I love you") is a 2007 Thai film written and directed by Poj Arnon. A gay romantic crime action drama, it is the story of a man who falls in love with a gunman assigned to kill him.

== Plot ==
A loner gunman named Maek is assigned to kidnap a police informant named Iht, but Maek has a change of heart when he takes Iht to the 'hit house'. Maek is ordered to kill Iht, but because he only kills scum and has discovered that Iht isn't bad, he refuses, turning the gun on the enforcers who had hired him to murder Iht. A gun battle ensues during which Maek is wounded, but Iht grabs Maek's gun and shoots their way out of the mobsters' headquarters. The two men then escape on Maek's motorcycle. Maek tells Iht to leave at gun point but he won't and takes Maek back to his rooftop hide-out. There, over a period of time, Iht tends to Maek's wound and finds himself attracted to him.

In fact, Maek is also attracted to Iht, but keeps it hidden, while Iht cares for his former would-be killer with great tenderness.

While giving Maek a bath one day, Iht kisses him on the mouth. Maek reciprocates and the two men engage in a passionate sexual experience. The next day, however, a conflicted Maek demands that Iht go away and leave him alone. Iht returns home to his fiancée, Sai, but is no longer interested in continuing a relationship with her. Iht spends his days pining over Maek, and tracks down Maek's brother, Mhok, and their mother. Mhok is HIV positive, as the result of sexual abuse by his and Maek's stepfather, and their mother is dying of AIDS.

Maek remains elusive, hiding from Iht when he visits the hideout, but leaving signs that he's there so Iht will return.

Though Maek avoids making contact with Iht, eventually he goes to visit his mother and brother, and Iht corners him at the entrance to the building, declaring his love for Maek and stressing how much he misses him. They kiss passionately. They are unfortunately covertly observed by Sai, Iht's live-in fiancée.

Maek's dream is to take his mother and brother away from Bangkok to the mountains of Mae Hong Son Province. But after Maek's mother overhears that Mhok has prostituted himself to survive after contracting AIDS from his stepfather, she commits suicide by hanging herself. The brothers take her down, and as they are rushing her from the apartment, she is killed by a gunshot fired by an unseen sniper. The bullet is presumably intended for Maek.

Maek's former mobster employers are gunning for him and Iht. Maek decides to hunt them down first, and he succeeds in killing them. After Mohk informs Iht what Maek is doing, Iht goes to the capo's house to try to stop Maek, but he is too late and misses Maek by a second. Iht is injured when the capo's wife shoots at a clock that shatters in Iht's face.

Maek, meanwhile meets his brother at the railway station to leave Bangkok for good. But before he can board the train, he is apprehended by the police and taken away. Mhok breaks down. He's the sole witness to his brother being apprehended.

Years pass by. Iht visits Maek in prison and reveals that he was left blind in the final gunbattle with Maek's ex-boss. Mhok commits suicide while at a Hospice of Watphrabahtnamphu in Lopburi because he no longer has the energy to fight his disease. Eventually, Maek is released from prison, and Iht meets him. But before the two men can leave to start their life together, Maek is shot dead by a single bullet fired by an unseen assassin. A bewildered, blind Iht collapses over his lover's corpse, swearing his love for him again and again.

Iht eventually regains his sight, and is finally able to view on his mobile phone a video recorded by Maek himself many years before, admitting that all along, he had loved Iht and that he would love him to his last breath.

== Cast ==
- Rattanaballang Tohssawat as Maek (Cloud)
- Chaiwat Thongsaeng as Iht (Stone)
- Weeradit Srimalai as Mhok (Fog)
- Chatcha Rujinanon as Sai (Sand)
- Suchao Pongwilai
- Cholprakran Chanruang
- Uthumporn Silaphan
- Rachanu Boonchuduang

== Production ==
When Bangkok Love Story was in pre-production, the release of its trailer in 2006 reportedly prompted objections from Thailand's National Police Office, which expressed concern over the film's portrayal of a gay policeman. At the time, Thai film censorship bodies included police representatives, which contributed to the filmmakers avoiding explicitly identifying Iht as a police officer in the final version of the film.

Both lead actors, Chaiwat Thongsang (Iht) and Ratanabanrang Tosawat (Maek), are heterosexual, according to a profile of the two actors in BK Magazine. Chaiwat said he took the role because he wanted the "challenge" and to "become famous". Ratanabanrang simply stated playing a gay man "is an honor".

Chaiwat said he had hoped camera angles could be used so he could avoid having to kiss his co-star, but director Poj Arnon insisted the kisses must be real. "It was totally disgusting at first, but we kind of got used to it after a while", Chaiwat said. Ratanabanrang said he had to imagine he was kissing his girlfriend. "Actually, we acted so well, that my girlfriend got paranoid".

Both actors acknowledged that the film would be compared to Brokeback Mountain, but Ratanabanrang noted that Poj Arnon had the idea for Bangkok Love Story long before Brokeback had been adapted into a film.

== Release and reception ==
Bangkok Love Story was released in Thailand cinemas on August 13, 2007. The film proved popular, with the Bangkok Post stating it was "the movie everybody has been talking about". The film earned US$325,000 in its Thailand theatrical run.

Critical reception was mixed. The weekly BK Magazine stated that the film suffered from being overly melodramatic, but praised the cinematography by Tiwa Moeithaisong, which "turns Bangkok into a character in its own right."

Reviews from the Bangkok English-language daily The Nation were characterised as "dismissive".

LGBT-related website Fridae praised Bangkok Love Story as "the boldest Thai gay movie to date." It additionally praised the film for being a departure from the Thai LGBT genre, which generally features coarsely stereotyped kathoey transvestite caricatures.

Gay Thai independent film producer Vitaya Saeng-aroon similarly praised the film, saying director Poj Arnon was "brave enough to shake society up".

Bangkok Love Story was screened at the 34th Brussels International Independent Film Festival, where it won the top prize, the Grand Award in all Categories. It was also the Opening Night selection for the 2007 Hong Kong Lesbian and Gay Film Festival, and played at the 2008 London Lesbian and Gay Film Festival.

TLA Releasing acquired theatrical, home video, television and video on demand rights for North America and the United Kingdom. The company plans to release the film in those territories in summer 2008.

== Soundtrack ==
The film also produced a popular theme song "Yahk-Roo...Tae-Mai-Yahk-Taam" (in Thai: "อยากรู้...แต่ไม่อยากถาม meaning "I want to know, but I don't want to ask") by Calories Blah Blah (in Thai: แคลอรี่ส์ บลาห์ บลาห์).
