= Royal City Avenue =

Entertainment district of Bangkok, Thailand

Coordinates: 13°45′0″N 100°34′37″E

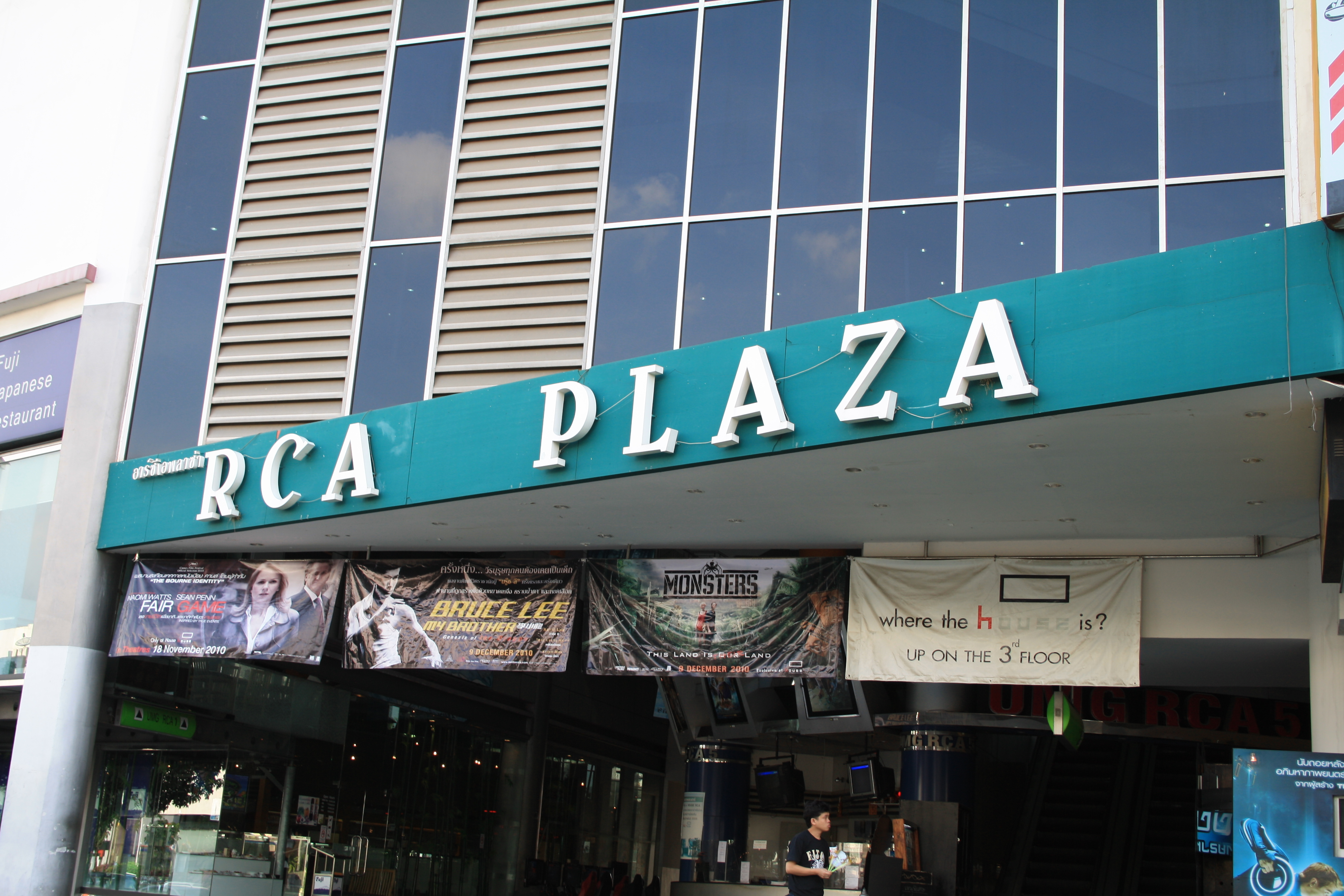
RCA Plaza, Bangkok, Thailand

Royal City Avenue or RCA is one of Bangkok's largest entertainment and clubbing areas. Located on in Huai Khwang district, RCA is a long street located between Rama IX Road and Phetchaburi Road. It contains a multitude of bars, nightclubs and live music venues. RCA is owned and operated by Narai Ruamphiphat Co., Ltd.

The Royal City Avenue project, covering 62 rai (25,000 square wah), is managed by Narai Ruampipat Co., Ltd., a subsidiary of the Bangkok Bank Group, on a 30-year lease from the State Railway of Thailand. The lease expired in October 2022. The State Railway of Thailand has temporarily renewed the lease on a year-to-year basis while SRT Asset Co., Ltd. conducts a development study and opens new bids. The temporary lease expires in 2024.

== Layout ==
Royal City Avenue, or RCA Road, has three overpasses, starting from Rama IX Road at the Phang Muang Intersection. There is one overpass on the public canal when entering the area from the Phang Muang Intersection towards Rama IX Road. Upon entering the area, the road heads southeast and crosses Samsen Canal. It then intersects with Chaturathit Road at the RCA Intersection. At the RCA Intersection, cars coming from the Phang Muang Intersection cannot proceed straight. They must make a U-turn in front of Piyavate Hospital to continue onto RCA Road. From there, they pass Route 66 and pass the headquarters of Bangkok Insurance and Asia Cement Public Company Limited. After passing both headquarter buildings, there is another overpass on the public canal in front of the Sichuan Restaurant and opposite the RCA branch of OfficeMate. After crossing the overpass, there is a fork in the road that ends on Phetchaburi Road. The main route ends at Soi Phetchaburi 47 (Soi Soonvijai).

== Places ==
Among the entertainment venues there are the UMG RCA cinemas, which include the House art film cinema, as well as a go-kart racing track, a bowling alley, restaurants and Tops Supermarket. RCA is also known for the nightclubs and discothèques located there.

== Notable clubs ==
- Route 66
- Flix
- Slim
- Hobb
- Ezze
- The Overtone Music Cave
- Nospace
- 808
- Inch
- JazzIt
- Baroque Club
- Love Boat Club
- Dude Nightclub
- T.D.C. Club
- Morgan Beat
