= Wang Thonglang subdistrict =

Wang Thonglang วังทองหลาง
- Khwaeng
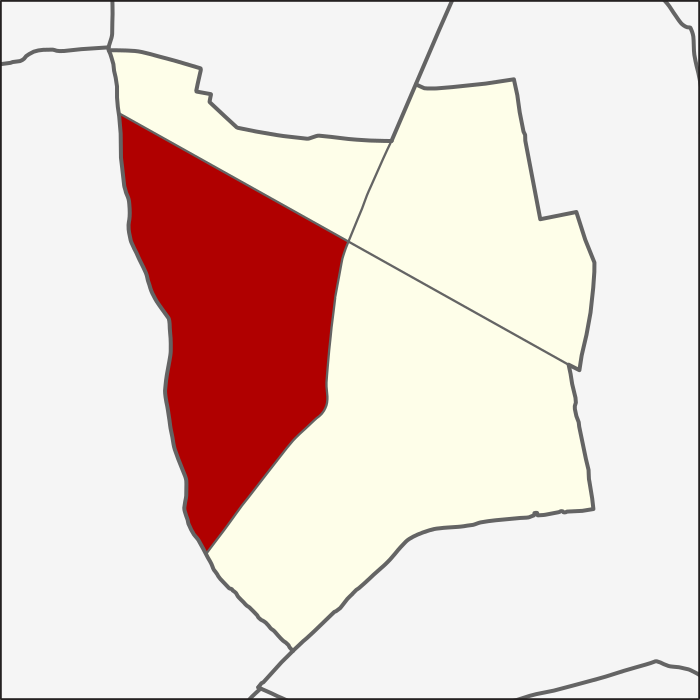
- Location in Wang Thonglang District
- Country: Thailand
- Province: Bangkok
- Khet: Wang Thonglang

Area
  - Total: 5.558 km^{2} (2.146 sq mi)

Population (2020)
  - Total: 24,208
- Time zone: UTC+7 (ICT)
- Postal code: 10310
- TIS 1099: 104501

Wang Thonglang (Thai: วังทองหลาง, pronounced [wāŋ tʰɔ̄ːŋ.lǎːŋ]) is a khwaeng (subdistrict) of Wang Thonglang District, in Bangkok, Thailand. In 2020, it had a total population of 24,208 people.
