= Phlapphla, Bangkok =

Phlapphla พลับพลา
- Khwaeng
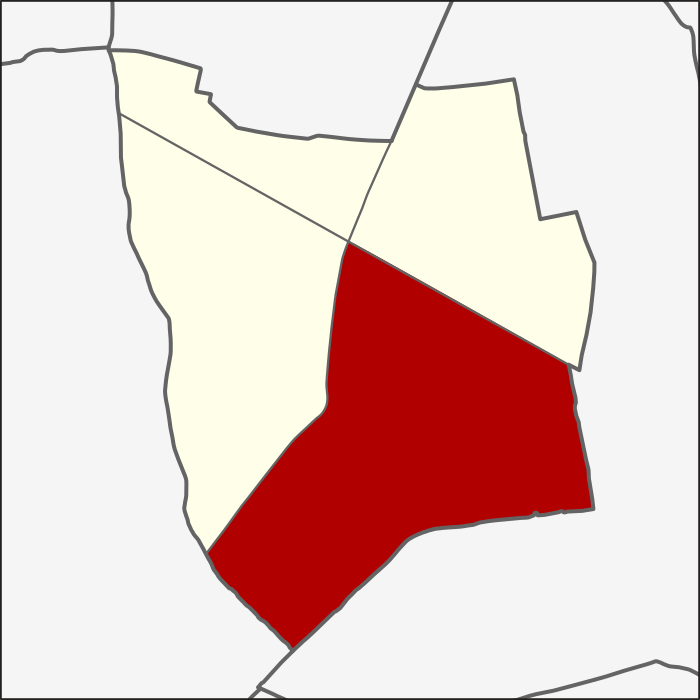
- Location in Wang Thonglang district
- Country: Thailand
- Province: Bangkok
- Khet: Wang Thonglang

Area
  - Total: 7.708 km^{2} (2.976 sq mi)

Population (2020)
  - Total: 43,721
- Time zone: UTC+7 (ICT)
- Postal code: 10310
- TIS 1099: 104504

Phlapphla (Thai: พลับพลา, pronounced [pʰláp.pʰlāː]) is a khwaeng (subdistrict) of Wang Thonglang district, in Bangkok, Thailand. In 2020, it had a total population of 43,721 people.
