= Chaiwat Thongsaeng =

Thai actor and model

- ชัยวัฒน์ ทองแสง
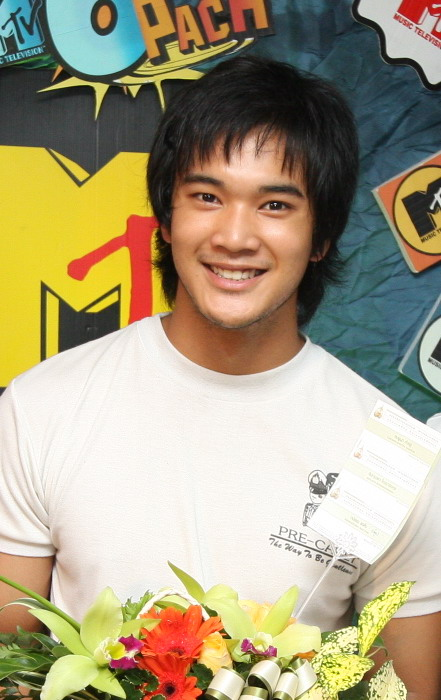
- Chaiwat at MTV Thailand in 2007
- Born: April 10, 1989 (age 37); Pathum Thani, Thailand
- Occupation: Actor
- Years active: 2007–present

Chaiwat "Tob" Thongsaeng (in Thai: ชัยวัฒน์ ทองแสง) born in Thailand on 10 April 1989 (Thai year 2532) is a Thai film actor. He is best known for his lead role in the film Bangkok Love Story as Iht.

Chaiwat graduated from Rittiyawannalai School, continuing at Sripatum University's Faculty of Arts specializing in Communications Art.

== Award nominations ==
- In 2008, he was nominated for Best Supporting Actor at the Thailand National Film Association Awards for his role in the film Bangkok Love Story

== Filmography ==
=== Film ===
Year	Title	Role
2007	Haunting Me	Main
2007	Bangkok Love Story	Iht
2010	Bang Rajan 2	Meunharn
2012	Spicy Beauty Queen of Bangkok 2	Chon
2014	Iron Ladies Roar!	Nu
2015	Mae Bia	Poj
2025	Jenny, I Love You	Somkhit

=== Television series ===
Year	Title	Role
2008	Spirit of Love	Min
2009	Yok Lai Mek	John
2010	Jub Tai Wai Rai Samon	Jojo
2011	Kularb Satan	Dang
2012	Raeng Ngao	Pongsakorn
2013	Madam Dun	Muscular handsome man
2013	Wiwa Paa Cha Taek	Toon / Pee Khoon Suek
2014	Pua Chua Krao	Golf
2015	Bang Rajan	Im
2015	Sood Tae Jai Ja Kwai Kwa	Dew
2016	Padiwaradda	Suaphin
2016	Piang Chai Khon Nee Mai Chai Poo Wised	Chaep
2016	Thayat Asun	Aphisak
2016	Guardian	Jimmy
2017	The Graveyard Story	
2017	Chaloei Seuk	Han
2017	Sri Ayodhaya	
2018	The Bitch War	Ong
2018	Sarb Krasue	Not
2018	Bangkok Love Stories 2: Innocence	
2019	Majurat Holiday	Suwan (Area 7)
2019	Raeng Ngao 2	Pongsakorn
2019	Pha Dong Payak	Phran Singh
2019	Yodrak Nakrob	Hoem
2020	The Daughter In Law	Koh
2024	Doctor Climax	Thongthian
2025	Chom Chai Ayothaya	Nanda Bayin
2025	The Young and the Ruthless	Phassakorn

== In popular culture ==
- Chaiwat Thongsaeng has appeared in a number of popular advertisements and fashion and lifestyle magazine covers (Volume, Stage and others)
- In 2008, he took part in bodybuilding competitions
- He represented Thailand at Mister International 2010.
