= Wang Thonglang district =

Wang Thonglang วังทองหลาง
- Khet
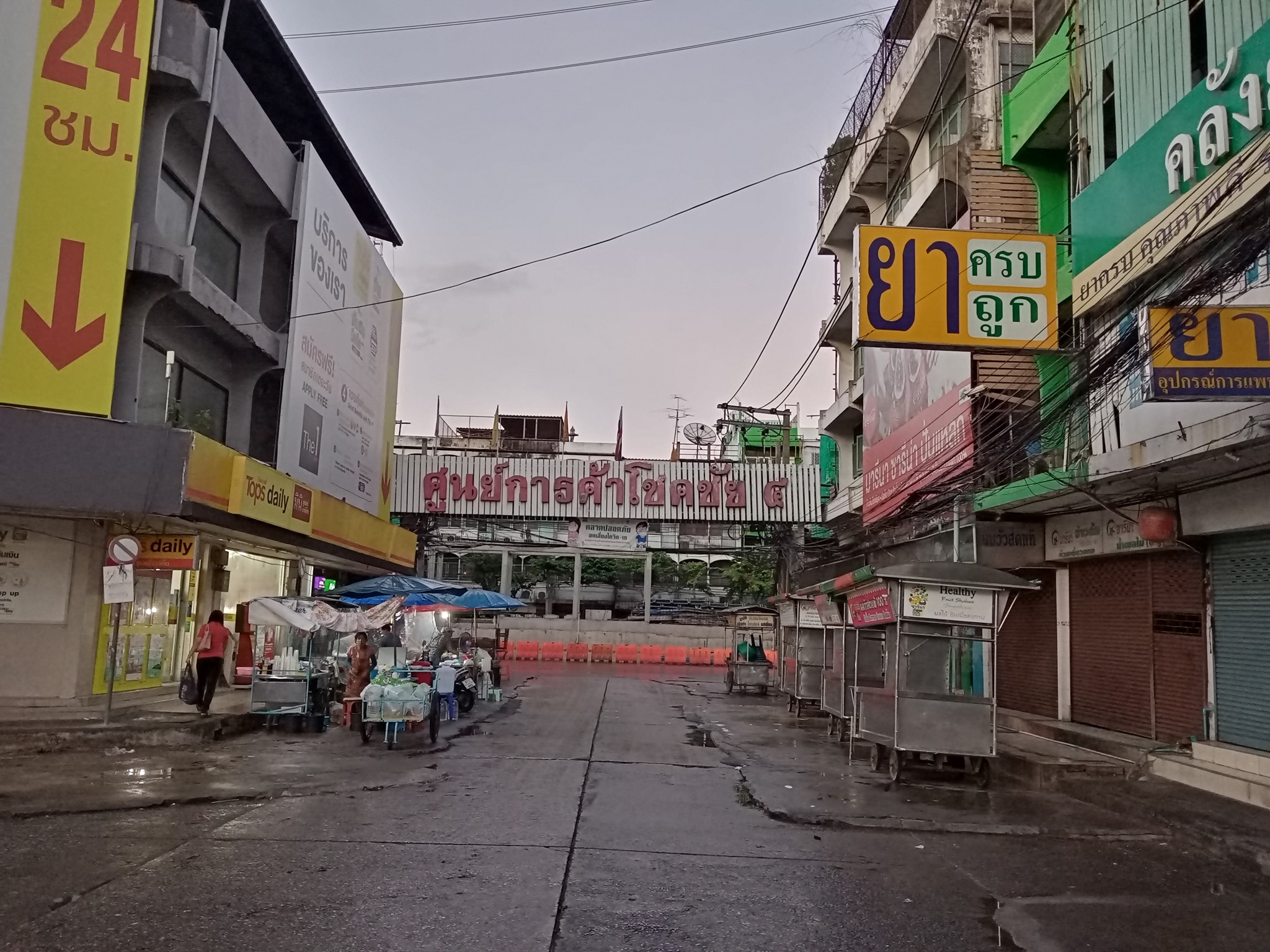
- Entrance of Chok Chai 4 Market

- Khet location in Bangkok
- Country: Thailand
- Province: Bangkok
- Seat: Phlapphla
- Khwaeng: 4
- Khet established: November 21, 1997

Area
  - Total: 19.265 km^{2} (7.438 sq mi)

Population (2017)
  - Total: 112,116
  - Density: 5,819.67/km^{2} (15,072.9/sq mi)
- Time zone: UTC+7 (THA)
- Postal code: 10310
- Geocode: 1045

Wang Thonglang (Thai: วังทองหลาง, pronounced [wāŋ tʰɔ̄ːŋ.lǎːŋ]) is one of the 50 districts (khet) of Bangkok, Thailand. It is bounded by other Bangkok districts (from north clockwise): Lat Phrao, Bang Kapi, Huai Khwang, and Chatuchak.

== History ==
The district was established on 21 November 1997 (announced 14 October 1997) occupying Wang Thonglang and part of Khlong Chan sub-district of Bang Kapi and part of Lat Phrao sub-district of Lat Phrao district. The total area was 19.205 km^{2}. In 2002 (announced 24 January, effective 11 March) the district boundary between Wang Thonglang and Lat Phrao districts was adjusted. Now Wang Thonglang has 18.905 km^{2} of area.

The name Wang Thonglang means 'the deep body of water around which Erythrina fusca grows'.

== Administration ==
The district is sub-divided into 4 sub-districts (khwaeng).

No.	Name	Thai	Area (km^{2})	Map
1.	Wang Thonglang	วังทองหลาง	5.558	แผนที่
2.	Saphan Song	สะพานสอง	1.934	แผนที่
3.	Khlong Chaokhun Sing	คลองเจ้าคุณสิงห์	4.065	แผนที่
4.	Phlapphla	พลับพลา	7.708	แผนที่
Total			19.265	แผนที่

== Education ==
The district is home to both local and insertional schools, including:

Secondary schools:

- Bodindecha (Sing Singhaseni) School

International schools:

- Lycée Français International de Bangkok (French school)
- Singapore International School of Bangkok
- Regent's International School, Bangkok

== District Council & Local Politics ==
The District Council for Wang Thonglang has seven members, who each serve four-year terms. Elections were last held on April 30, 2006. The results were as follows:

- Democrat Party - 7 seats

Following the 2014 coup d'état by the National Council for Peace and Order (NCPO), the military government abolished the office of District Council Member (locally known as Sor Khor), leaving only members of the Bangkok Metropolitan Council (BMC). In the 2026 Bangkok Metropolitan Council election, which was held concurrently with the Bangkok gubernatorial election, the winner in Wang Thonglang was Anurak Lertwattanaphaiboon, a former BMC member from the Democrat Party. He had previously served as the BMC member since 2022 under the Pheu Thai Party. He was also one of the eight BMC members elected from the Democrat Party in this election.

== Diplomatic missions ==
- Embassy of Cambodia
- Embassy of Laos

== Places ==
- Chao Phraya Bodindecha Museum
- Golden Place
- Chok Chai 4 Market

== Transportation ==
- The district is crossed by the Yellow Line of the MRTA with four stations: Chok Chai 4, Lat Phrao 71, Lat Phrao 83, and Mahat Thai.
- There is also Khlong Saen Saep boat service running along Khlong Saen Saep with piers Mahadthai, Ramkhamhaeng.U, Wat Thepleela, Ramkhamhaeng.29, and The Mall Ram 3 on its border between Bang Kapi district.
- The main roads in the Wang Thong Lang are Lat Phrao, Chok Chai 4, and Pradit Manutham, among others. They are served by many bus lines of both BMTA and private joint companies, such as 8, 44, 73, 73ก, 96, 137, 178, 514, etc.
