= Nawamin Road =

Street in Bangkok, Thailand

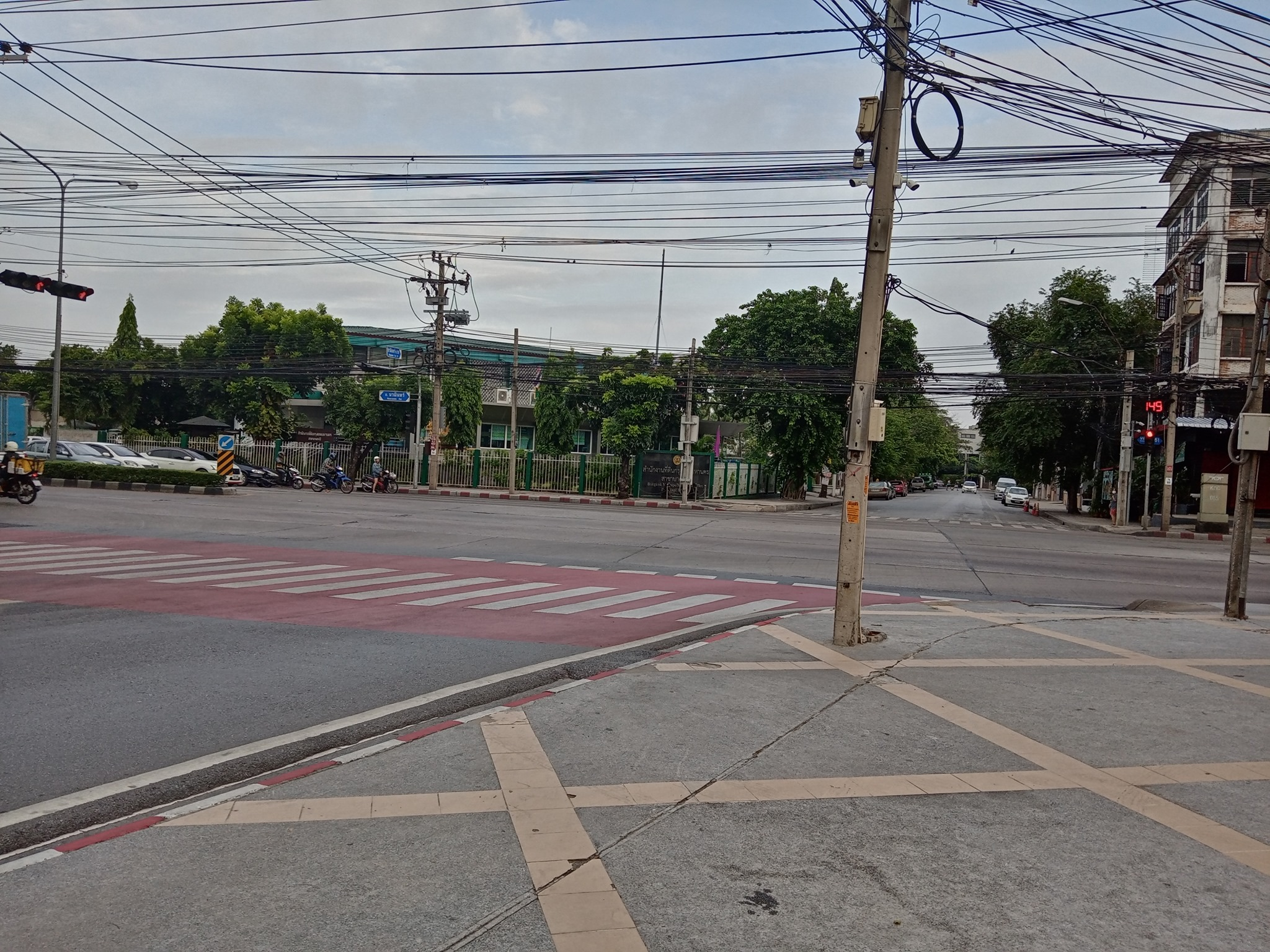
- Kan Kheha Intersection, where Nawamin Road cuts across Si Burapha Road include Soi Nawamin 51.
- Interactive map of Nawamin Road
- Length: 20 km (12 mi)
- Coordinates: 13.800555°N 100.649008°E
- South end: Seri Thai Road, Bang Kapi District
- Major junctions: Prasoet Manukit Road (Highway 351); Ratchada–Ram Inthra Road (Highway 350)
- North end: Ram Inthra Road (Highway 304), Khan Na Yao District

Nawamin Road (Thai: ถนนนวมินทร์, pronounced [tʰà.nǒn nā.wá.mîn]) is a highway in Bangkok, Thailand. It begins at Seri Thai Road and continues north as far as its end at Raminthra Road (Highway 304). Its total length is approximately 20 km.

Important roads that intersect with Nawamin Road include Si Burapha Road, Pho Kaeo Road, Prasoet Manukit Road (Highway 351), as well as the newly completed Ratchada–Ram Inthra Road (Highway 350) and the nearly completed expressway that runs parallel above it.
