= Rama IX Road =

Road in Bangkok, Thailand

Coordinates: 13.740881°N 100.62085°E

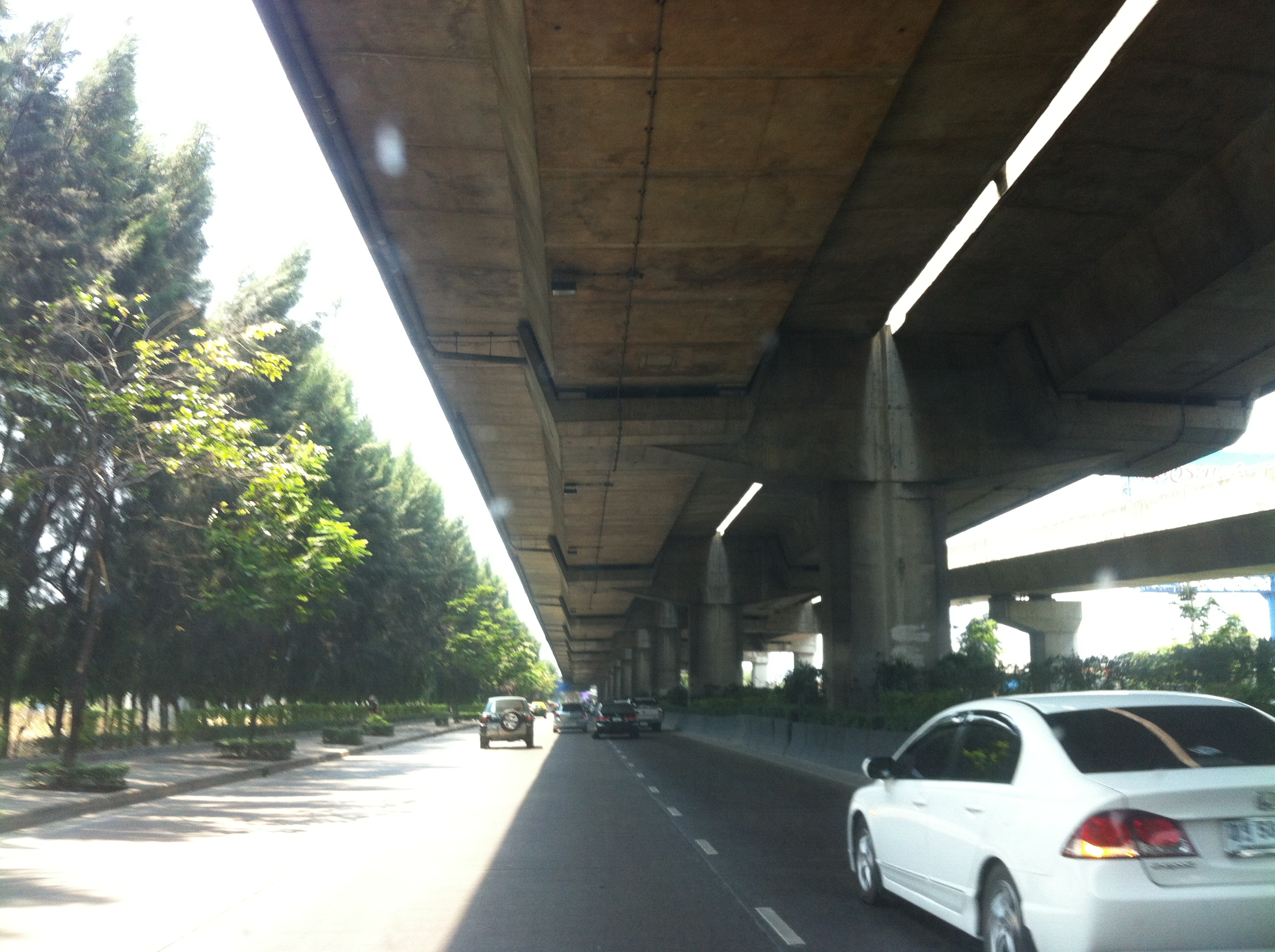
Rama IX Road is formed by the frontage road of Si Rat Expressway in the area of Suan Luang

Rama IX Road, also written as Rama 9 Road (Thai: ถนนพระราม 9, RTGS: Thanon Phra Ram Kao) is one main road in east Bangkok. It starts at Rama IX Intersection, where Ratchadaphisek meet Asok-Din Daeng Roads and acted a boundary between Din Daeng and Huai Khwang districts, then eastward through Watthana Tham Junction, through the crossroad of Pradit Manutham and intersects with Ramkhamhaeng Road in Bang Kapi district to the end at Srinakarin Interchange, the starting point of Srinakarin Road in the area of Suan Luang District, Motorway 7 (commonly known as Motorway) is a continuous route. Total distance is about 8.7 km (5.4 mi).

The phase between Ramkhamhaeng Intersection to Srinakarin Interchange, it has the status of Highway 343, formerly under the supervision of the Department of Highways. Currently under the supervision of Bangkok (BMA). The distance from the crossing of Khlong Chuad Yai, it runs parallel to the Si Rat Expressway in form of frontage road all the route.

Its named in honour of King Bhumibol Adulyadej (Rama IX) (reigning 1946–2016). It is regarded as one of the Rama Series Road, consisting of Rama I, Rama II, Rama III, Rama IV, Rama V, Rama VI, and Rama IX is the last.

The road was opened in 1978 under the unofficial name "Liap Khlong Samsen Fang Nuea Road" (ถนนเลียบคลองสามเสนฝั่งเหนือ, "northern Samsen waterside road").

Rama IX Road is considered to be one of Bangkok's nightlife spots like the neighbouring Ratchadaphisek Road, especially in the 1990s (before 1997 Asian financial crisis) many nightclubs were operating on this road. They are known among Thai people as "café".

Bordering the road are Phra Ram 9 MRT station, MCOT Public Company Limited (MCOT), Government Housing Bank (GH Bank), Mass Rapid Transit Authority of Thailand (MRTA), Royal City Avenue (RCA), Rama IX Super Tower, etc.
