= Pradit Manutham Road =

Street in Bangkok, Thailand

- Liab Duan Ramintra Road
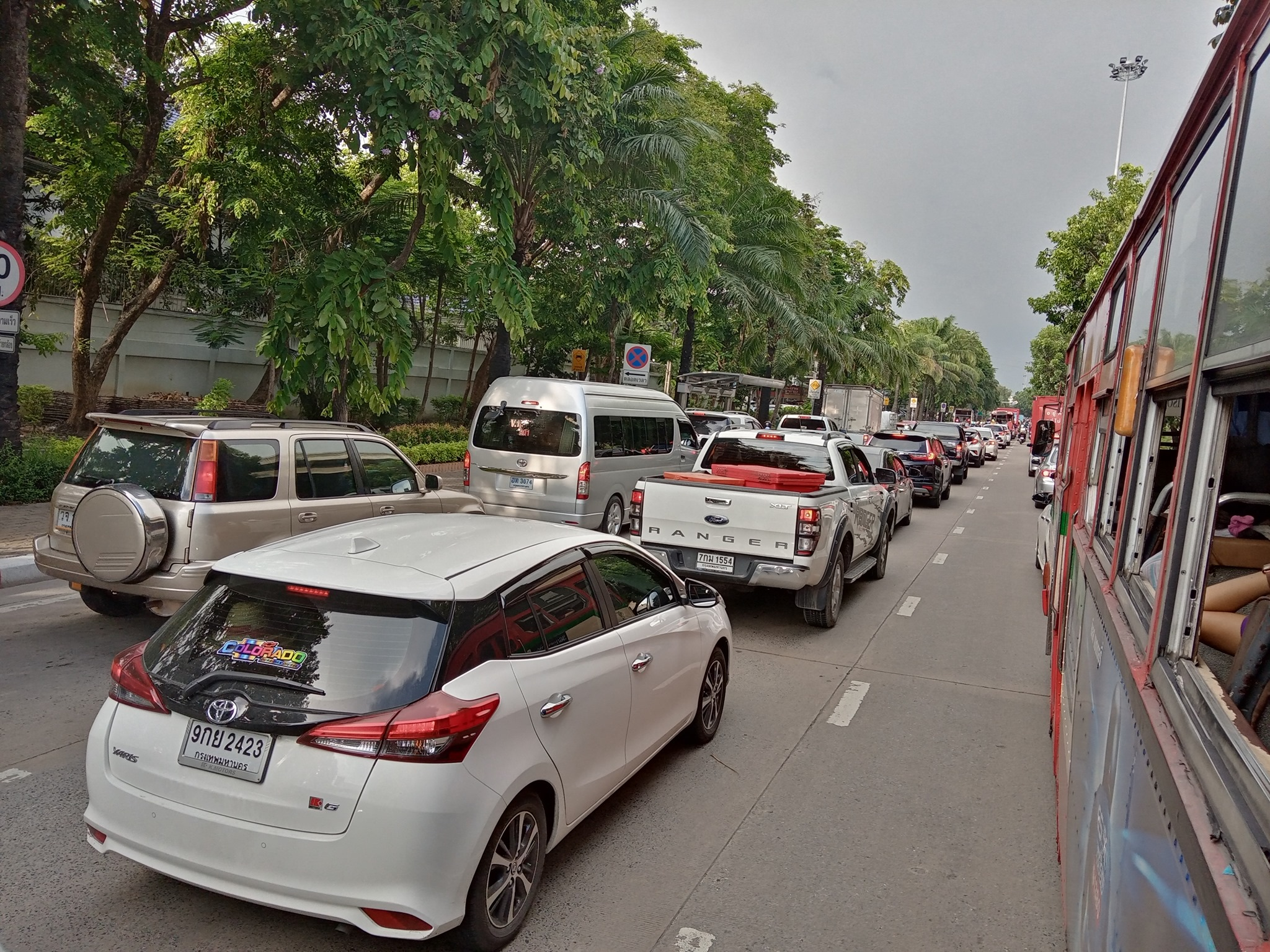
- Pradit Manutham Road in Wang Thonglang (taken from a bus window).
- Interactive map of Pradit Manutham Road
- Native name: ถนนประดิษฐ์มนูธรรม
- Former name: Ekkamai–Ramintra Road
- Namesake: Pridi Banomyong
- Length: 12 km (7.5 mi)
- Location: Bangkok, Thailand
- Coordinates: 13°47′43″N 100°36′47″E
- South end: Ekkamai Road (Soi Sukhumvit 63), Huai Khwang
- Northesat end: Ramintra Road (Highway 304), Bang Khen

Pradit Manutham Road (Thai: ถนนประดิษฐ์มนูธรรม, pronounced [tʰà.nǒn prà.dìt má.núː.tʰam]) is one of the streets in Bangkok. It is a major arterial that connects the inner city with the northeastern suburban area of Bangkok. It is named after the royal title Luang Pradit Manutham, or Pridi Banomyong, the 7th Prime Minister of Thailand and a senior statesman who was the leader of the Free Thai Movement during World War II. It is considered a road that is closely paired with another nearby route, Prasert Manukit Road (Highway 351), which is more commonly known as Kaset–Nawamin Road.

Begins at the end of Soi Sukhumvit 63 (Ekkamai) in the Huai Khwang area, heading north-northeast. The road passes through Rama IX Road and crosses Khlong Lat Phrao into the Wang Thonglang district, where it intersects with Pracha Uthit Road and Lat Phrao Road. It then crosses Khlong Song Khram and enters the Lat Phrao district (from this point onward, its eastern serves as a boundary between Lat Phrao, Wang Thonglang, Bang Kapi, and Bueng Kum districts).

After that, it intersects with Prasert Manukit Road (Kaset–Nawamin), crosses Khlong Khok Khram into the Bang Khen area, and continues until it terminates at Ramintra Road (Highway 304) near km 5.5. The road is 6 lanes wide (3 lanes in each direction) with a central median, totaling approximately 12 km (7.5 mi) in length.

An elevated expressway runs above the central median from Rama IX Road to Ramintra Road. As a result, this route runs parallel to the Chalong Rat Expressway and is commonly referred to as the "Liab Duan Ramintra Road" (ถนนเลียบด่วนรามอินทรา, [tʰà.nǒn lîap dùan raːm in.tʰaː.ra], lit. 'Ramintra Expressway Parallel Road'), or more simply Liab Duan Ramnintra. Originally, it was known as "Ekkamai–Ramintra Road" (ถนนเอกมัย–รามอินทรา, [tʰà.nǒn ʔèːk.kà.māj raːm in.tʰaː.raː]) before being renamed to its current name in 1998. There are also overpasses at major intersections, including Lat Phrao Road and Prasert Manukit Road.

Along Pradit Manutham Road especially in the Wang Thonglang area there is a bike lane that runs parallel to the sidewalk on both sides of the road. The roadside is decorated with many types of trees which create a shaded and pleasant atmosphere. Rows of oil palms are planted along the sidewalks in an orderly line and beyond them there are rows of Malay padauk trees along the bike lane which add more greenery to the area.

At present there are many garden style restaurants located along the road especially near the intersection with Prasert Manukit Road where the atmosphere feels like a suburban countryside. There are also several high end housing developments built along this route on land that was previously underdeveloped but has now become prime real estate due to its closeness to the city center. In addition the road is lined with community malls and shopping centers such as The Crystal Ekkamai Ramindra which opened in 2008 and CDC Crystal Design Center with Central Eastville.
