= Saphan Song =

Saphan Song สะพานสอง
- Khwaeng
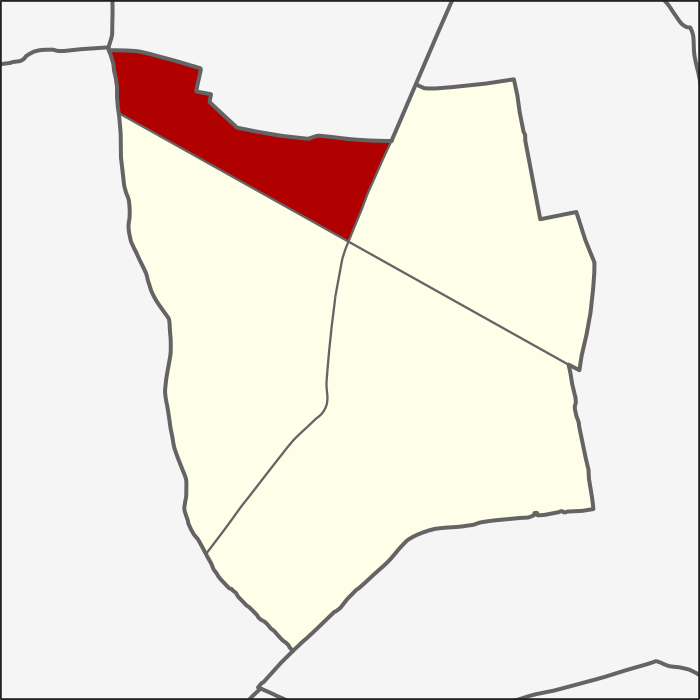
- Location in Wang Thonglang District
- Coordinates: 13°47′39″N 100°35′58″E
- Country: Thailand
- Province: Bangkok
- Khet: Wang Thonglang

Area
  - Total: 1.934 km^{2} (0.747 sq mi)

Population (2020)
  - Total: 11,451
- Time zone: UTC+7 (ICT)
- Postal code: 10310
- TIS 1099: 104502

Saphan Song (Thai: สะพานสอง, pronounced [sā.pʰāːn sɔ̌ːŋ]) is a khwaeng (subdistrict) of Wang Thonglang District, in Bangkok, Thailand. In 2020, it had a total population of 11,451 people.
