= Highway 351 (Thailand) =

Road in Thailand

National Highway 351
- ทางหลวงแผ่นดินหมายเลข 351
- ถนนประเสริฐมนูกิจ; Thanon Prasert Manukit

Route information
- Length: 9.178 km (5.703 mi)
- History: Completed in 2003

Major junctions
- West end: Hwy 1 (Phahonyothin Rd) / Hwy 302 (Ngam Wong Wan Rd)
- Chalong Rat Expy; Nawamin Road
- East end: Motorway 9 (Kanchanaphisek Rd)

Location
- Country: Thailand
- Major cities: Bangkok

Highway system
- Highways in Thailand; Motorways; Asian Highways

Prasert Manukit Road (Thai: ถนนประเสริฐมนูกิจ, RTGS: Thanon Prasert Manukit, pronounced [tʰā.nǒn prà.sɤ̀ːt mā.nū.kìt]) or Highway 351, commonly known as Kaset–Nawamin Road (Thai: ถนนเกษตร–นวมินทร์, RTGS: Thanon Kaset–Nawamin, [tʰā.nǒn kà.sèːt nā.wá.mīn]), is a highway in Bangkok, Thailand. It begins at Kasetsart Intersection on Phahonyothin Road, Chatuchak district, as a continuation after the end of Ngamwongwan Road, and runs east until its end at a three-way intersection with Nawamin Road, in Bueng Kum district. Its total length is 9.178 km.

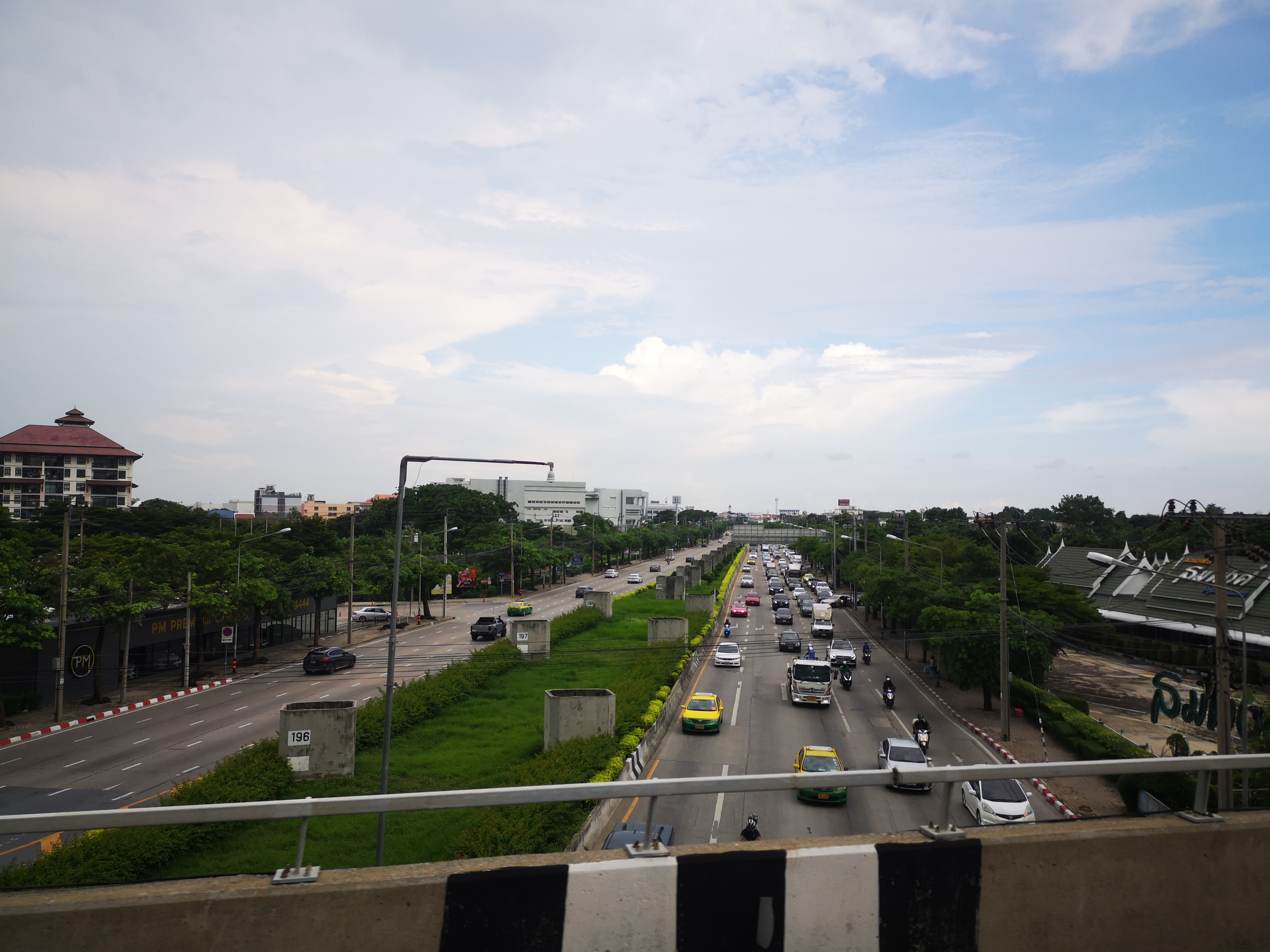
Prasert Manukit Road at the intersection with Pradit Manutham Road.

Construction on the road was completed in 2003. The Bangkok Road Naming Commission formally changed its name to Prasort Manukit Road in 2006. However, in popular practice and on many maps, Kaset-Nawamin Road is still common.

The name Prasert Manukit Road was originally assigned in 2003 to the section of Pradit Manutham Road between Rama IX Road and Lat Phrao Road. This change was met with complaints from the public, and in 2004 the road's name was changed back. Then, in 2009, the name was assigned to Highway 351 instead.
