= Tha Raeng, Bangkok =

Tha Raeng ท่าแร้ง
- Khwaeng
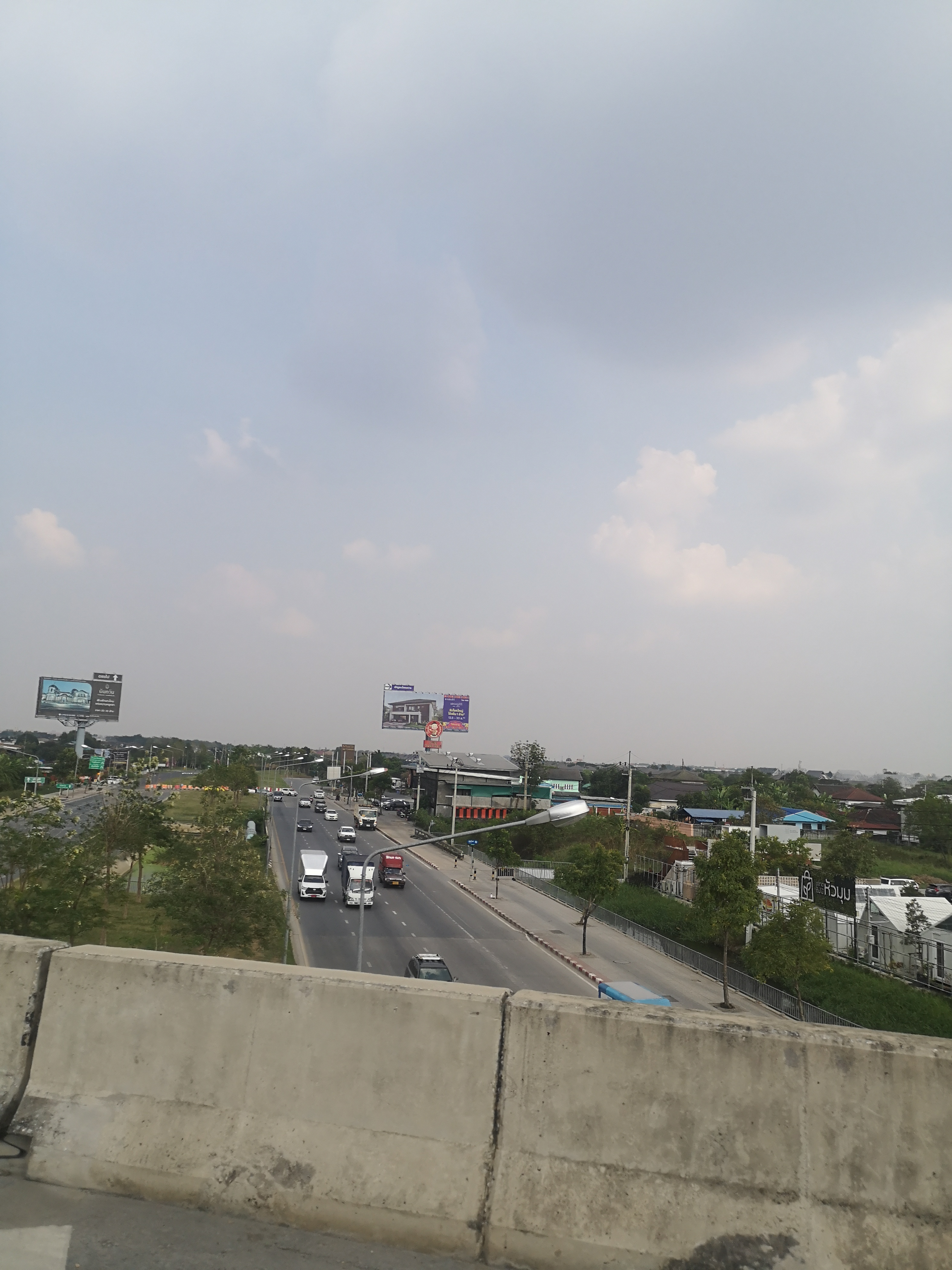

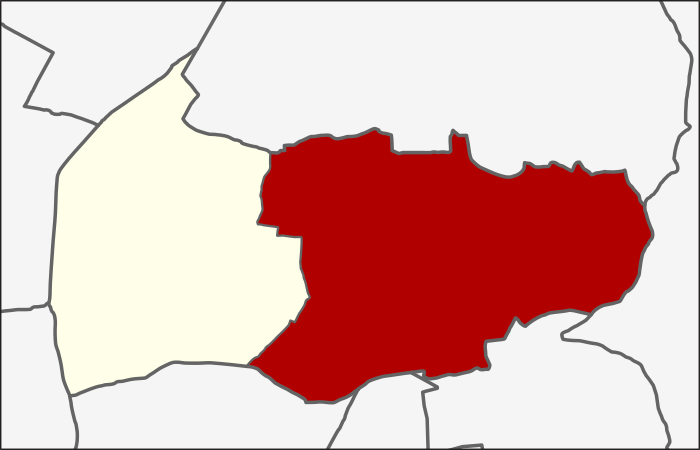
- Location in Bang Khen District
- Country: Thailand
- Province: Bangkok
- Khet: Bang Khen

Area
  - Total: 23.717 km^{2} (9.157 sq mi)

Population (2020)
  - Total: 97,658
- Time zone: UTC+7 (ICT)
- Postal code: 10220, 10230
- TIS 1099: 100508

Tha Raeng (Thai: ท่าแร้ง, pronounced [tʰâː rɛ́ːŋ]) is a khwaeng (subdistrict) of Bang Khen District, in Bangkok, Thailand. In 2020, it had a total population of 97,658 people.
