= Chandrakasem Rajabhat University =

University in Thailand

Coordinates: 13°49′13″N 100°34′31″E

Chandrakasem Rajabhat University (CRU) is a tertiary educational institution in the north of Bangkok, Thailand. It offers post-diploma certificates and degree level education from the bachelor's degree to master's degree, with Ph.D offered in several majors.

Founded in 1940, Chandrakasem was Thailand's first training college for secondary school teachers. In 1991 Chandrakasem Teachers College was named an outstanding tertiary educational institute by the Ministry of Education. The following year, King Bhumibol Adulyadej bestowed the name Chandrakasem Rajabhat Institute on the former college.

On 14 June 2004, all Rajabhat institutes nationwide were upgraded by the king, who signed the Rajabhat University Act of B.E 2547 (2004), which was announced in the Royal Gazette for implementation on 15 June 2004. This raised all Rajabhat institutes to Rajabhat universities, creating a close-knit group of Thai universities dedicated to preserving the Thai heritage and subject to the National Tertiary Education Commission of the Ministry of Education.
