= Lat Phrao district =

Lat Phrao ลาดพร้าว
- Khet
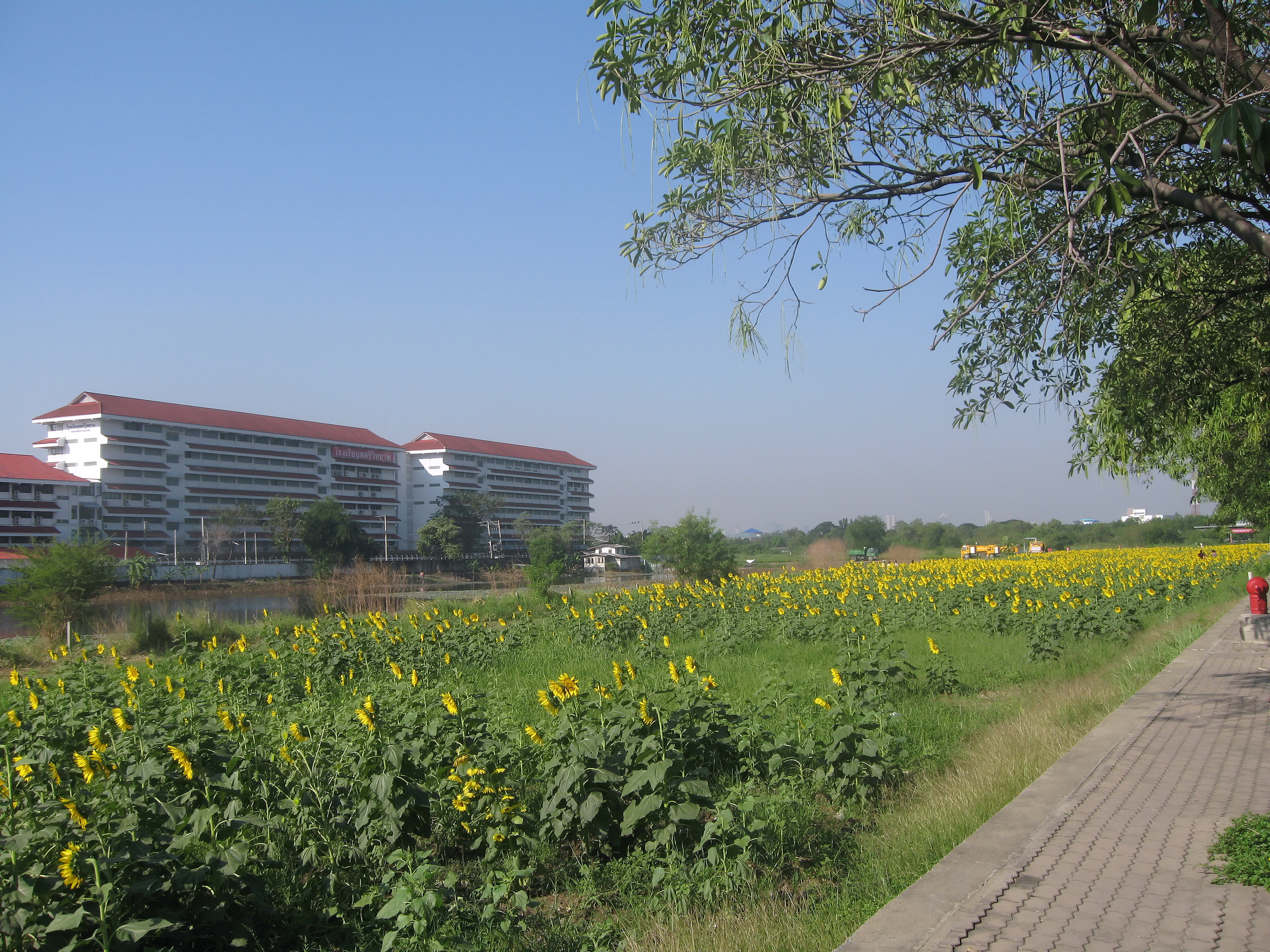
- Sunflower field, the only one in Bangkok, behind Satriwitthaya 2 School

- Khet location in Bangkok
- Coordinates: 13°48′13″N 100°36′27″E
- Country: Thailand
- Province: Bangkok
- Seat: Lat Phrao
- Khwaeng: 2
- Khet established: 4 September 1989

Area
  - Total: 22.157 km^{2} (8.555 sq mi)

Population (2017)
  - Total: 120,394
  - Density: 5,599.72/km^{2} (14,503.2/sq mi)
- Time zone: UTC+7 (ICT)
- Postal code: 10310 and 10230
- Geocode: 1038

Lat Phrao (Thai: ลาดพร้าว, RTGS: Lat Phrao, pronounced [lâːt pʰráːw]) is one of the 50 districts (khets) of Bangkok, Thailand. The district is bounded by six other districts (from north clockwise): Bang Khen, Bueng Kum, Bang Kapi, Wang Thonglang, and Chatuchak.

Despite its name, the district is not crossed by Lat Phrao Road, but is situated in immediate proximity to it.

== History ==
Formerly, Lat Phrao was a tambon of Bang Kapi district, in what was then Phra Nakhon province, before the unification of Thonburi and Phra Nakhon into the single administrative area of Krung Thep (Bangkok). Later it was a sub-district (tambon) of the Bang Kapi District (amphoe), after naming conventions were changed for administrative districts of Bangkok.

On 4 September 1989, Lat Phrao was split off from Bang Kapi along with Bueng Kum as new districts.

In 1997, the boundaries of Lat Phrao District were modified to balance the size and population of Bangkok's districts. The portion of Chorake Bua sub-district north of Khok Khram and Ta Reng canals was reassigned to Bang Khen district, and portions of the Lat Phrao sub-district were added to Wang Thonglang district.

On 24 January 2002, portions of Wang Thonglang District were reassigned to Lat Phrao Sub-district.

The word "Lat Phrao" literally means "slope of coconut". However, the true origin or intended meaning of the name remains uncertain. The district seal features a coconut tree sprouting two fresh leaves, suggesting that the area may once have been filled with coconut orchards.

== Administration ==
The district is divided into two sub-districts (khwaeng).

No.	Name	Thai	Area (km^{2})	Map
1.	Lat Phrao	ลาดพร้าว	15.102	Map
2.	Chorakhe Bua	จรเข้บัว	7.055	Map
Total			22.157	Map

== District council & local politics ==
The district council for Lat Phrao has seven members, who each serve four-year terms. Elections were last held on 30 April 2006. The results were seven seats for the Thai Rak Thai Party.

Following the 2014 coup d'état by the National Council for Peace and Order (NCPO), the military government abolished the office of the district council member (locally known as Sor Khor), leaving only members of the Bangkok Metropolitan Council (BMC). In the 2026 Bangkok Metropolitan Council election, which was held concurrently with the Bangkok gubernatorial election, the winner in Lat Phrao district was Ratchaya Phengsuk of the People's Party.
