= Wat Nang Ratchaworawihan =

Buddhist temple in Thailand

- Wat Nang
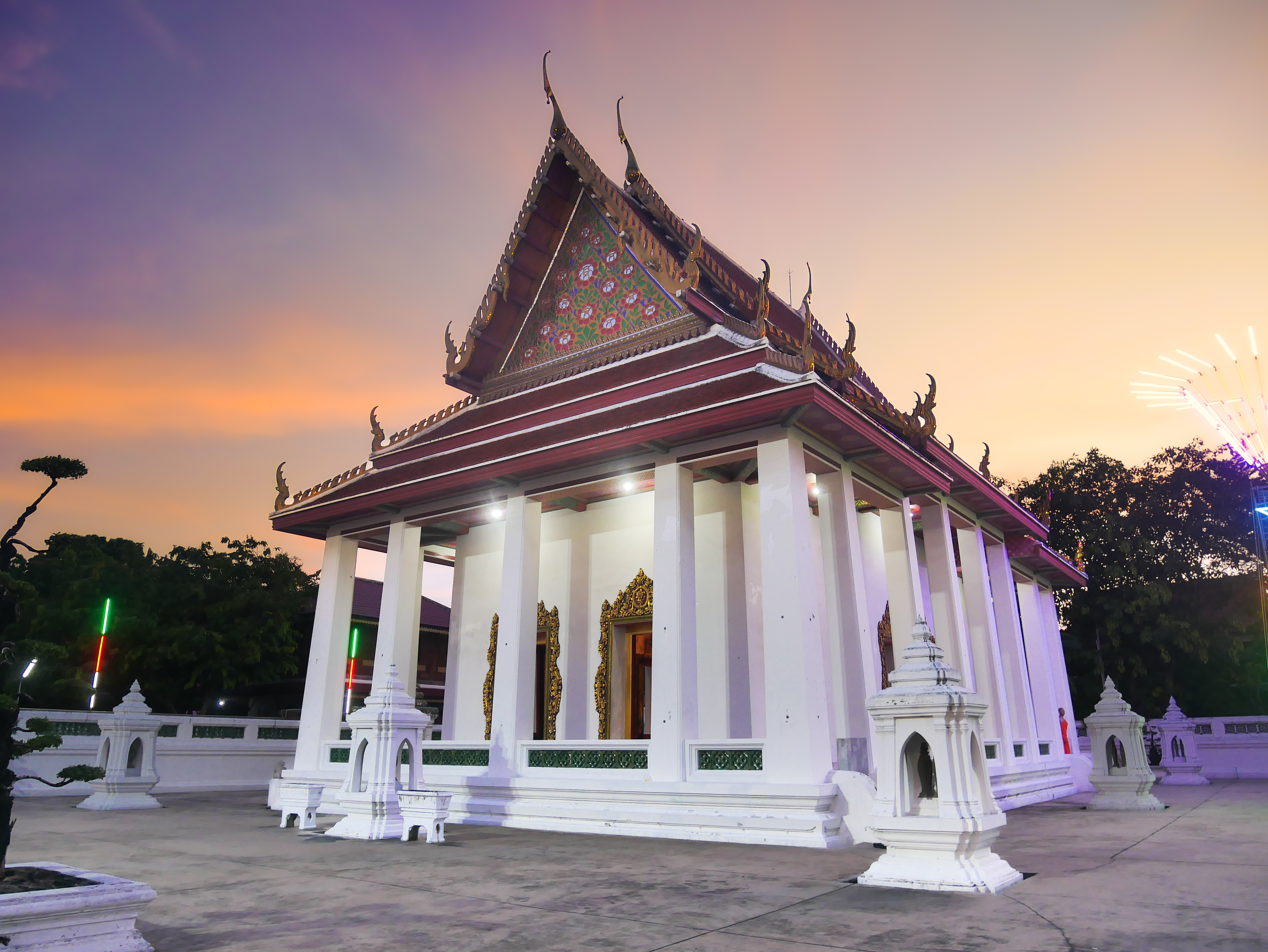
- The ubosot

- Location within Bangkok

Religion
- Affiliation: Buddhism
- Sect: Theravāda Mahā Nikāya
- Status: Third class royal temple

Location
- Location: 200 Soi Wutthakat 42, Wutthakat rd, Bang Kho, Chom Thong, Bangkok 10150
- Country: Thailand
- Interactive map of Wat Nang Ratchaworawihan
- Coordinates: 13.705173°N 100.465002°E

Wat Nang Ratchaworawihan (Thai: วัดหนังราชวรวิหาร), usually shortened to Wat Nang (วัดหนัง) is classified as the third class abbey in royal temple within Ratchaworawihan classification.

It is considered to be one of the famous temples in the Chom Thong neighbourhood, also formerly known as Bang Khun Thian, as well as Wat Ratchaorot, Wat Nang Nong, or Wat Sai.

== History and naming ==
Wat Nang is an ancient monastery built by unknown local resident in the Ayutthaya period during the reign of King Thai Sa of Ban Phlu Luang house. The exact date as to when it was initially built is unknown since it was later abandoned for almost two centuries. Despite having become a royally patronize monastery, however, its original name is kept unchanged. One of the bells in the tower is an invaluable antique bell that can trace its roots back to year 1717 and it is a marvelous piece of work that is said to have been molded by a team led by Phra Maha Phuttarakkit and Muen Phetpitchit.

During the early Rattanakosin period, Princess Sri Sulalai, mother of King Nangklao (Rama III) of Chakri house, renovated the entire temple with the exception of a few objects such as the principle Buddha image in the ubosot (ordination hall), three stone Buddha images in the vihara (sanctuary) and the bell.

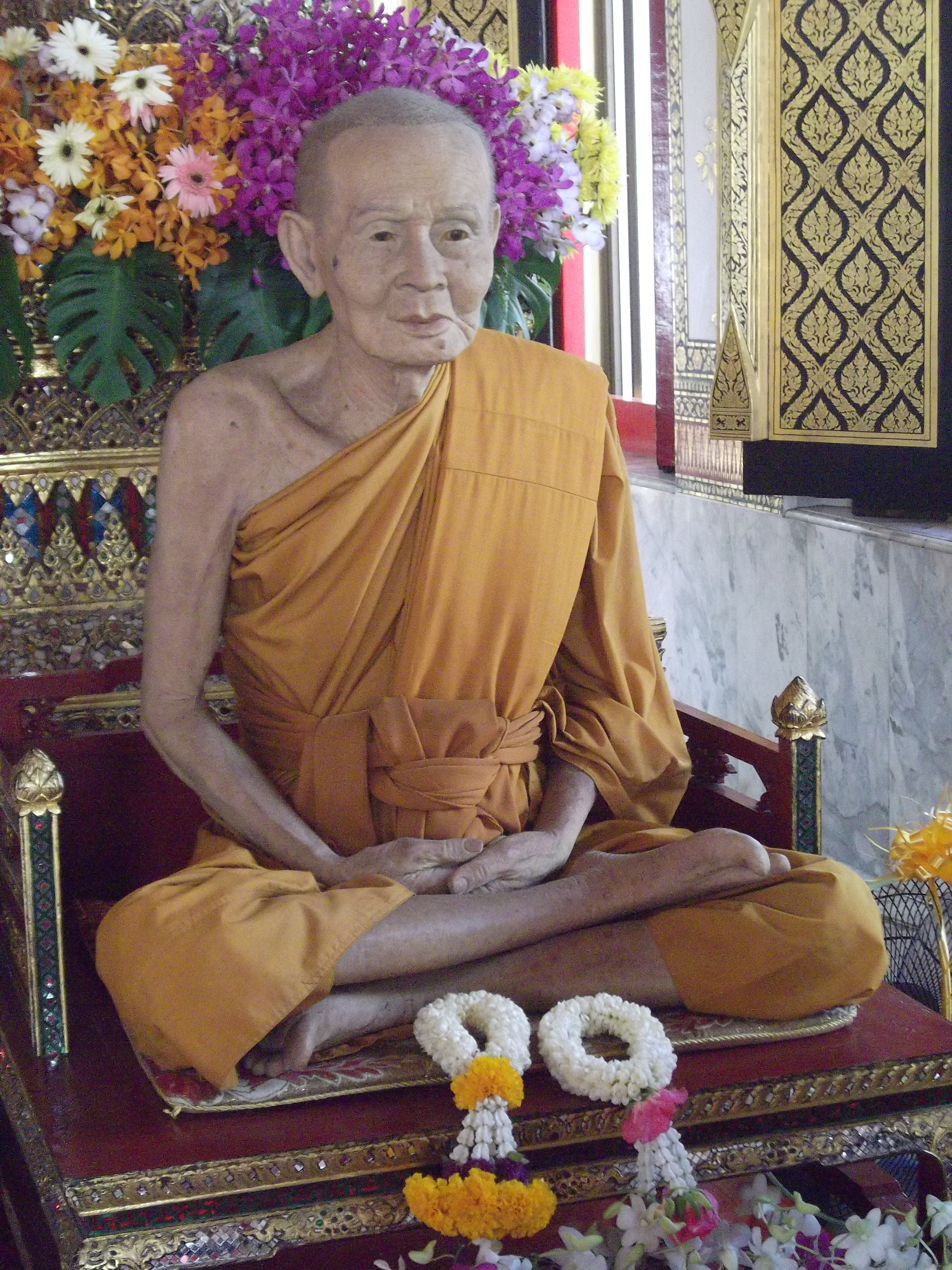
Wax figure of Luang Pu Iam

The temple renovation was celebrated in 1837. During the reign of King Chulalongkorn (Rama V) restoration was again carried out to improve the temple's state of preservation. The ubosot constructed with bricks and lime cement, has a three-tired roof. Inside the building there are paintings on the upper wall of falling floral motif. Enshrined in ubosot is the principle Buddha image named Luang Pho Sukhothai (หลวงพ่อสุโขทัย). It was made in the style of Sukhothai art cast in the suduing Mara position. In addition, the image of the late most revered legendary monk, Luang Pu Thuat is kept here.

Its name Wat Nang literally "leather temple". The reason it got this name, believed that this is because in the past the temple grounds were used as a place to dry cowhides to be stretched out to make drumheads. Another explanation states that the area around the temple was a place for nang talung (shadow puppet) making.

Wat Nang is also well known as a temple where a famous monk lived, Luang Pu Iam, otherwise known as Chao Khun Thao used to be an abbot before. He was a monk who was famous for his magic spells and the creation of various sacred objects during the reign of King Chulalongkorn. One of the most collectable relics and most holy item made by Luang Pu Iam is Phra Pidta Yanyoong Lae Pim Prakob. It is already one antique collector's most sought after items that are believed to possess magical powers which bring good fortune to the owners.

== Location ==
The temple is lined on the northern bank of Khlong Dan canal opposite to Wat Nang Nong inside the Soi Wutthakat 42, Bang Kho, Chom Thong, Bangkok.
