= Wat Kaeo Phaithun =

Buddhist temple in Bangkok, Thailand

- Wat Bang Prathun Nai
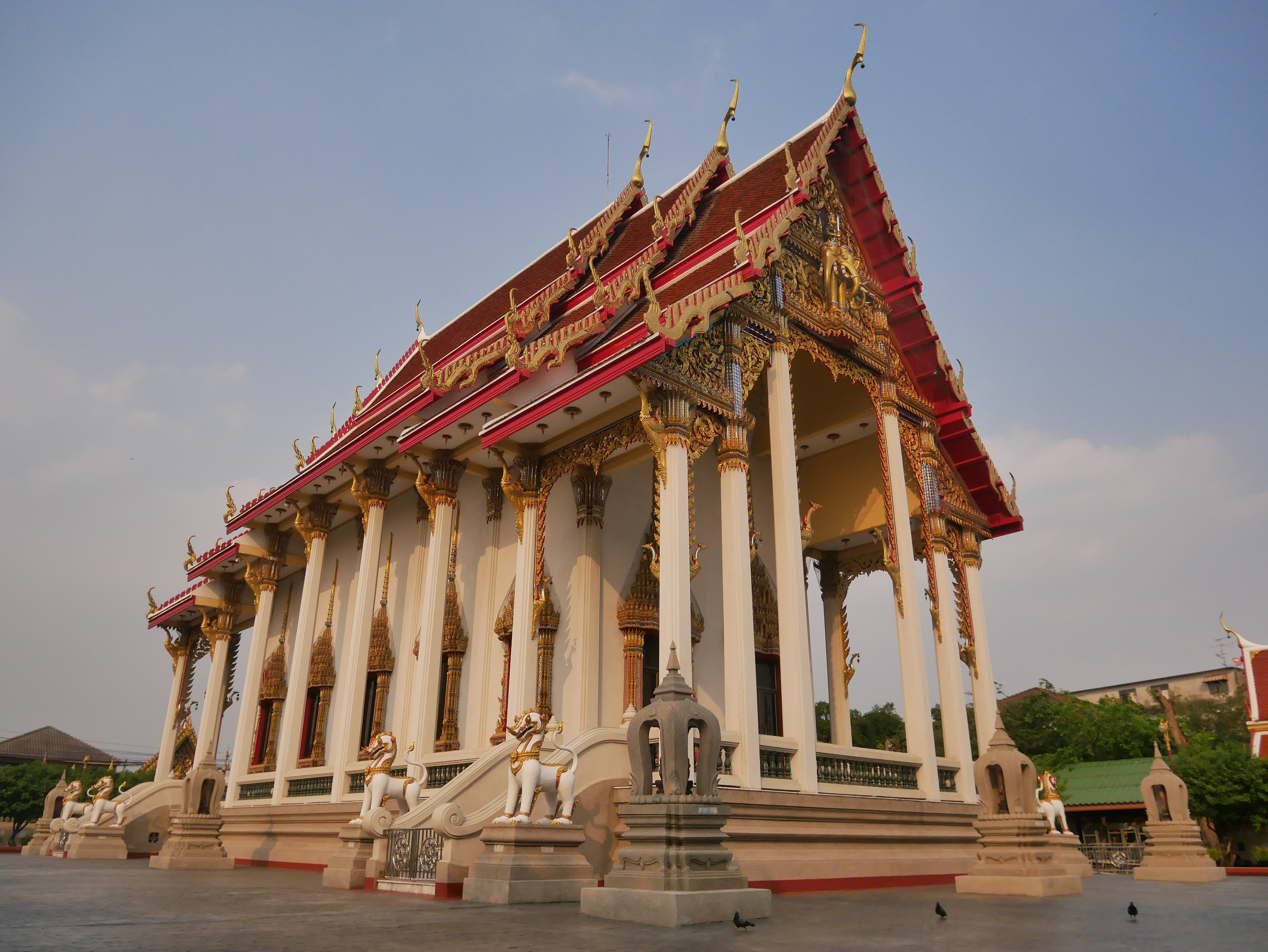
- The ubosot

- Location within Bangkok

Religion
- Affiliation: Buddhism
- Sect: Theravāda Mahā Nikāya
- Status: Civilian monastery

Location
- Location: 104 Soi Ekkachai 14, Ekkachai Rd, Bang Khun Thian, Chom Thong, Bangkok 10150
- Country: Thailand
- Interactive map of Wat Kaeo Phaithun
- Coordinates: 13.696766°N 100.456639°E

Wat Kaeo Phaithun (Thai: วัดแก้วไพฑูรย์) formerly and still colloquially known as Wat Bang Phrathun Nai (วัดบางประทุนใน) is a historical temple in Bangkok's Thonburi side, considered to be one of the most beautiful and outstanding monasteries in the Chom Thong neighbourhood.

== History ==
The origin name of the temple was Wat Bang Prathun Nai since it was founded on the canal Khlong Bang Prathun in the area known as Bang Prathun. Thus, for the sake of simplicity, the temple was named after the area's name where it was built. There is no written record of the founder's name and the date or year of when it was founded. However, the ubosot (main hall) style and its condition can be traced back to early Rattanakosin era, therefore should be at least 200 years ago.

Not far away along the bank of Khlong Bang Prathun and adjacent to Khlong Dan also known as Khlong Sanam Chai is where another neighbouring temple, Wat Bang Prathun Nok is located.

Bang Phrathun is one of the old hamlets existed many years beside Khlong Bang Prathun and near to the busy Khlong Dan, that in the olden days, were customarily used as the main traveling routes to the western and southern provinces. Master poet, Sunthorn Phu has once described in his travelogue Nirat Mueang Phet (นิราศเมืองเพชร, "journey to Phetchaburi"), when he was on his way passing down the canal through this neighbourhood to Phetchaburi.

A verse from his travelogue is translated as follows:

Bang Prathun is like a roof that protects me from the harsh elements and a blessing to my heart. It feels like having a cover against the breezy wind and the bitter cool of the clew. Here is a warm-hearted place to learn on and feel rested.

Assumed that the temple was renamed from Wat Bang Prathun Nai to Wat Kaeo Phaithun during the King Mongkut (Rama IV)'s reign.

== Temple components ==
There are two separated kuti (monk's accommodation) built a distant away from each other by Luang Phu Boon, the abbot, since the resident monks were studying dharma in two different methods; Vipassanātura and Kantatura. The two methods cause antagonism between the two branches of Buddhism in Thailand. Later on, Luang Phu Boon was expelled from the temple and before he left to Songkhla in southern region. He gave tamarind's seeds to his ardent disciples and faithful followers to plant them as a memento of him. The reason behind this is that tamarind trees are perennial plants which have an extremely long life span and today some of them are still there in the temple's premises bear witness to this past event. There is one tamarind tree located beside the bridge and another one on the opposite side of the road that pass in front of the temple.

Afterward many of his successors have renovated old buildings and many additional constructions were carried out. In 1932, Phra Liam Thamakamo, the abbot at that time, had decided to build a more spacious ubosot to accommodate more religious activities and a greater number of resident monks.

The first ubosot has been kept in good condition and later the building was designated for lesser activity whereby the small ubosot was turned into vihāra (sanctuary). However, the original principal Buddha image is still housed in this same building. Although many years have passed. Luang Pho Boon's popularity has not diminished by time and he is still held in great respect by great many people.

The former ubosot still enjoys the patronage of much of the local restidents and many devoted people from nearby districts. Even now, many people still come to pay their respects to the sacred Luang Phu Boon on a daily basis.

In addition, sala kan parian (sermon hall) is also beautiful and said to be the only one in Thailand. It is entirely made of carved-wooden partition and has exquisitely beautiful carvings telling stories from the Sudhanujataka, part of the Paññāsa Jātaka. This wooden house should have been built around the reigns of King Nangklao (Rama III) to the King Mongkut (Rama IV).

== Gallery ==
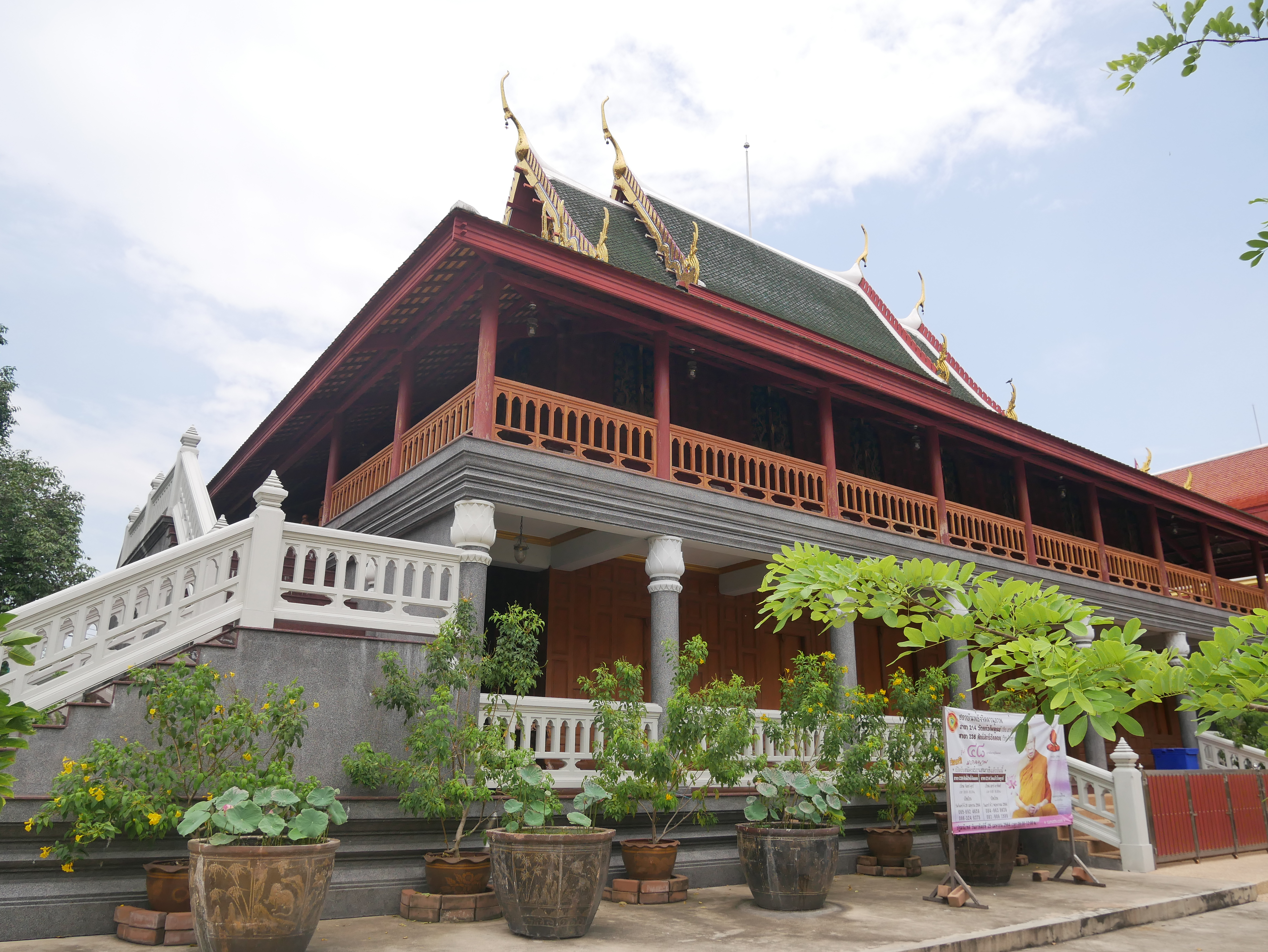
The sala kan parian

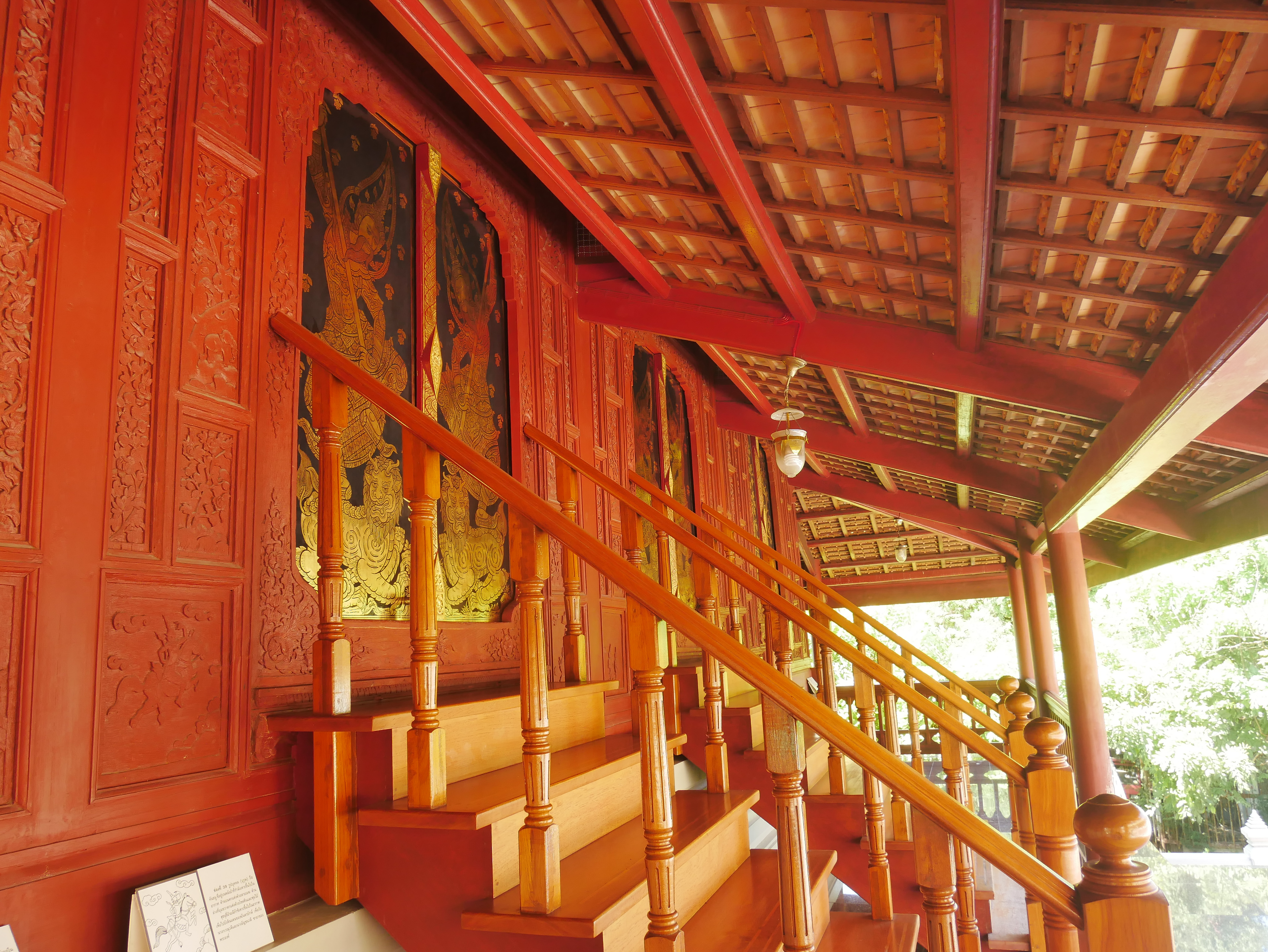
Staircase of sala kan parian

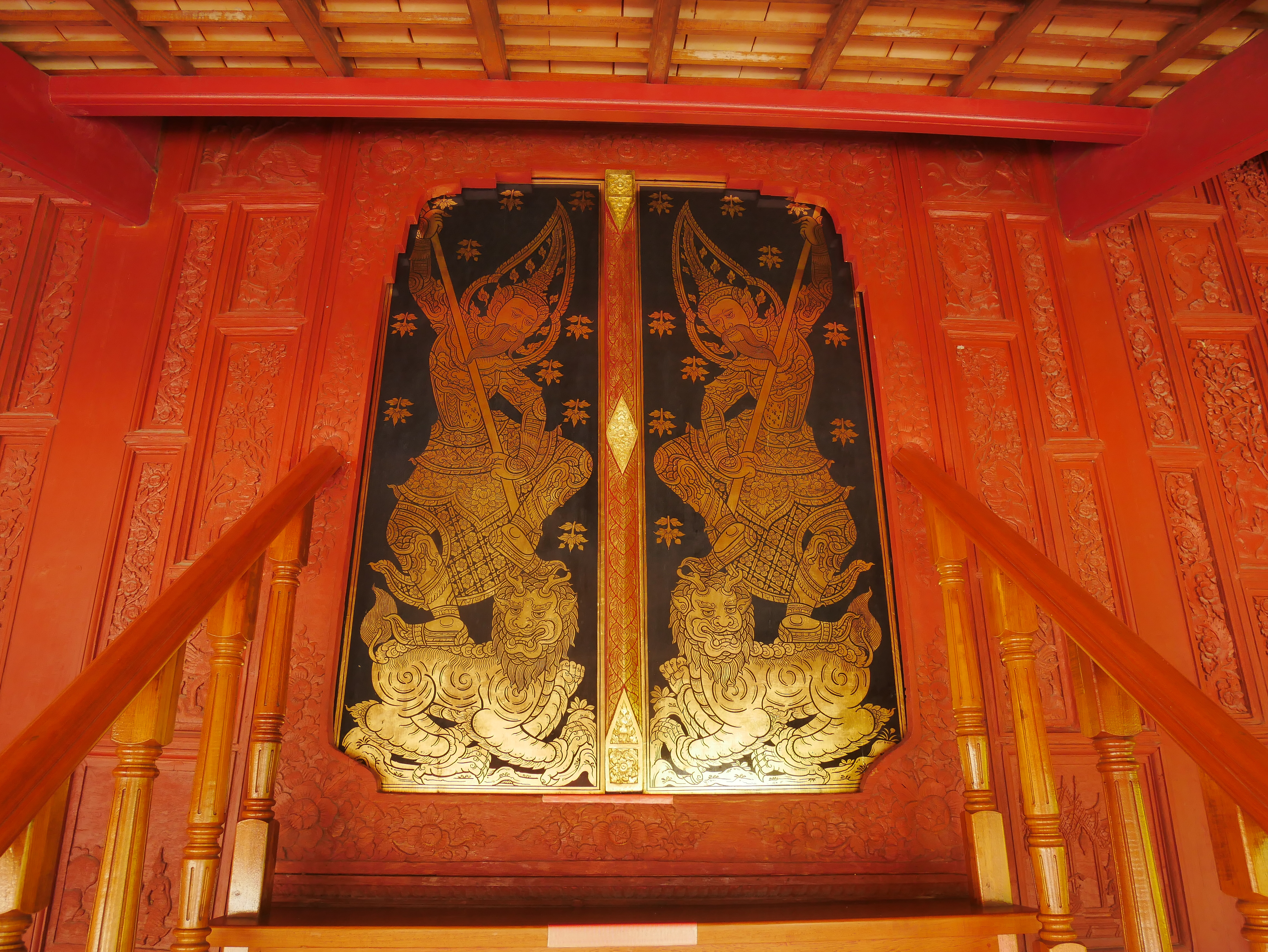
The beautiful lai rot nam (gilded black lacquer) door panels of the sala kan parian

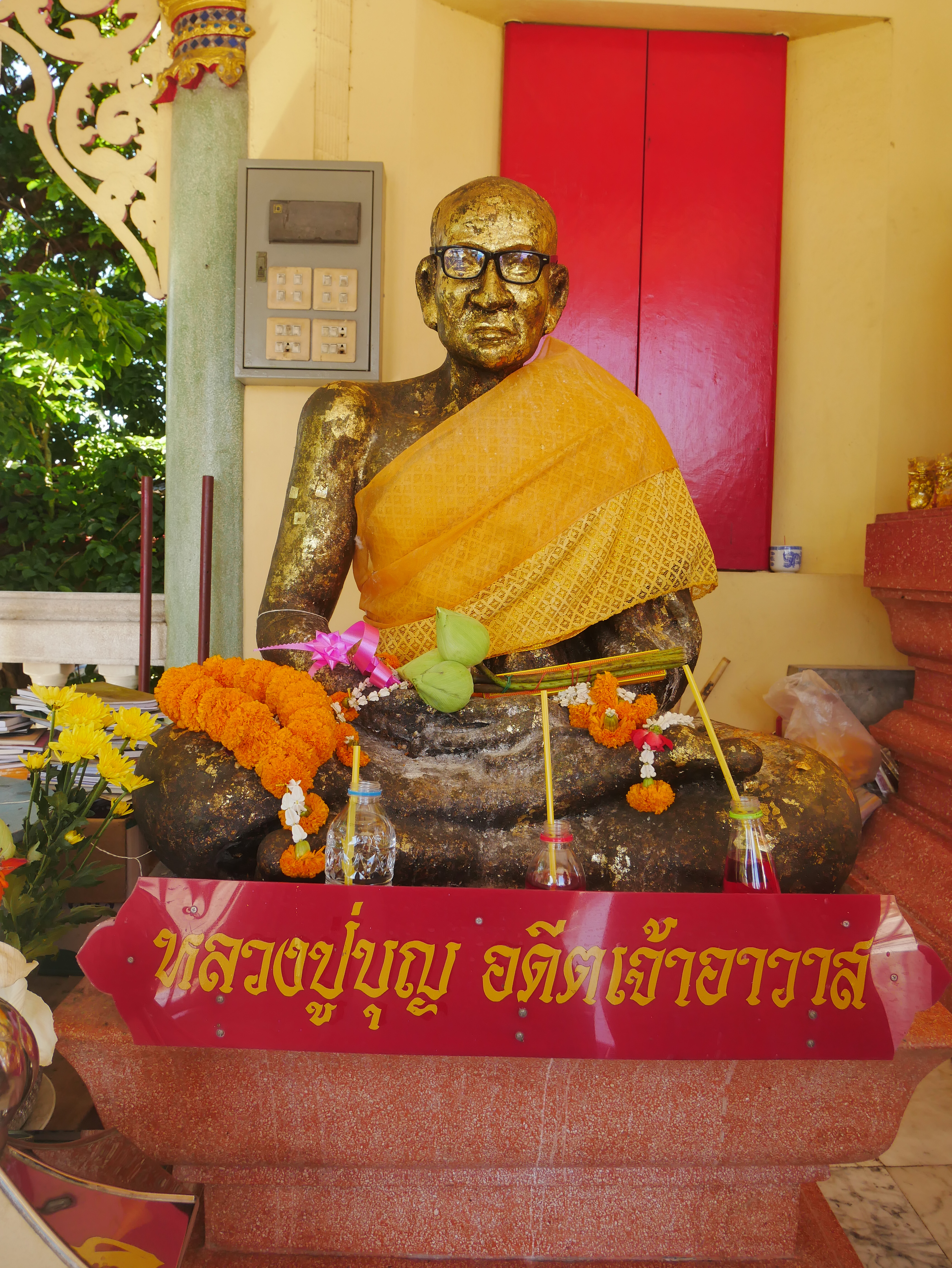
The statue of Luang Phu Boon

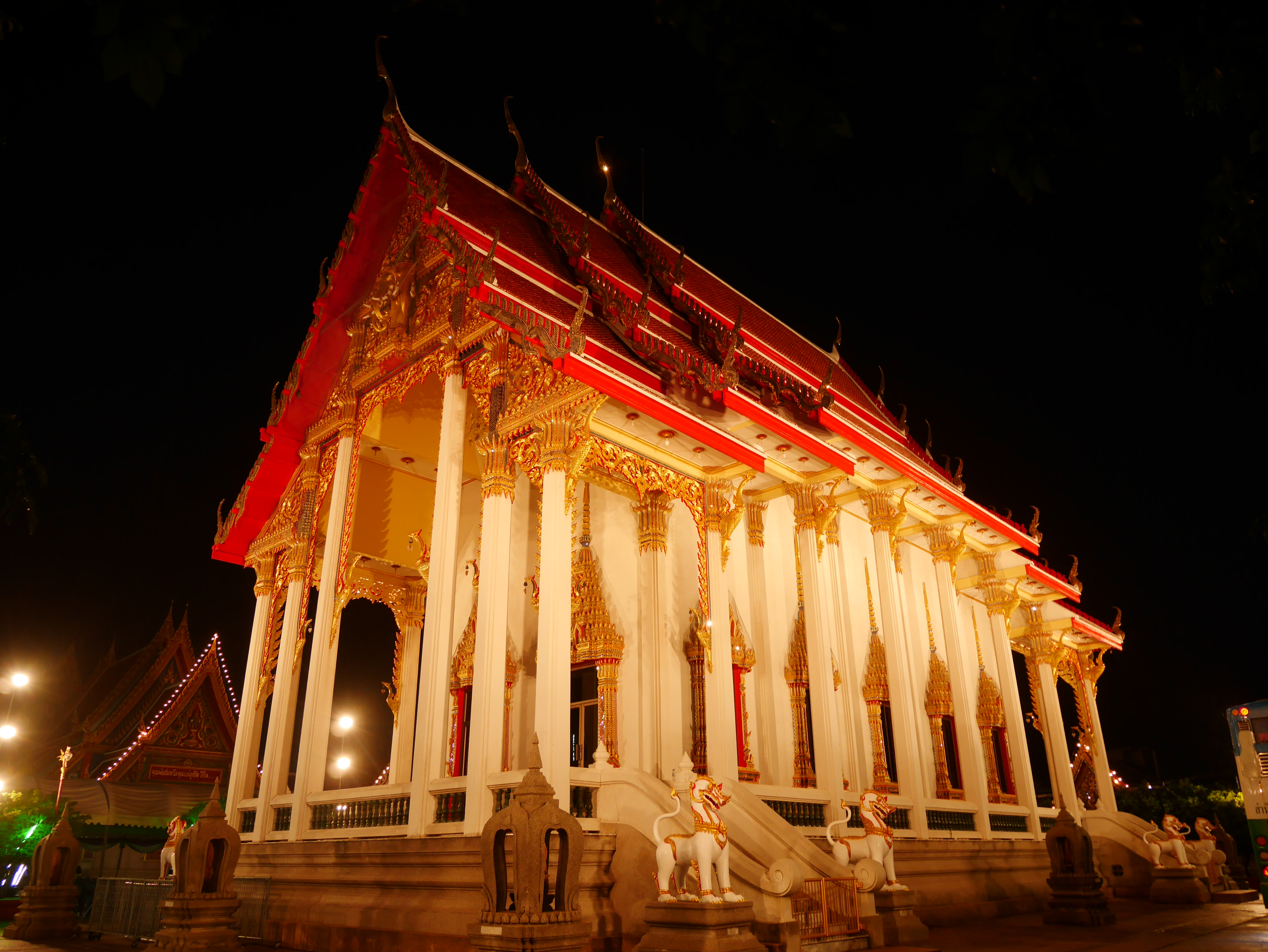
The ubosot in nighttime
