= Chom Thong =

Chom Thong (Thai: จอมทอง) may refer to:

- Chom Thong District, Bangkok, a district (khet) in Bangkok
- Chom Thong District, Chiang Mai, a district (amphoe) in Chiang Mai Province
- Chom Thong Subdistrict, Bangkok, a subdistrict (khwaeng) in Chom Thong District, Bangkok
- Chom Thong (Phitsanulok), a subdistrict (tambon) in Mueang Phitsanulok District
