= Poomjai Garden =

Private garden and museum in Bangkok, Thailand

Coordinates: 13.6914°N 100.4668°E

- ภูมิใจการ์เด้น
- Type: Private garden and museum
- Location: Chom Thong, Bangkok, Thailand
- Area: 7 rai (1.1 ha)
- Opened: 5 November 2017

Poomjai Garden (Thai: ภูมิใจการ์เด้น, RTGS: phum chai kaden) is a private garden and museum in Bangkok, Thailand. Located on a former lychee farm in Chom Thong district, Poomjai Garden opened on 5 November 2017.

== History ==
The 7 rai property adjacent to Khlong Bang Khun Thian was established prior to the reign of King Rama V. The surrounding area of Bang Khuntian became renowned for its fruit orchards, which grew multiple varieties of lychees.

In 2018, the Bang Khun Thian Lychee was giving geographical indication (GI) status.
