= Wat Sai, Chom Thong =

Buddhist temple in Chom Thong district, Bangkok, Thailand

Wat Sai
- Wat Sai
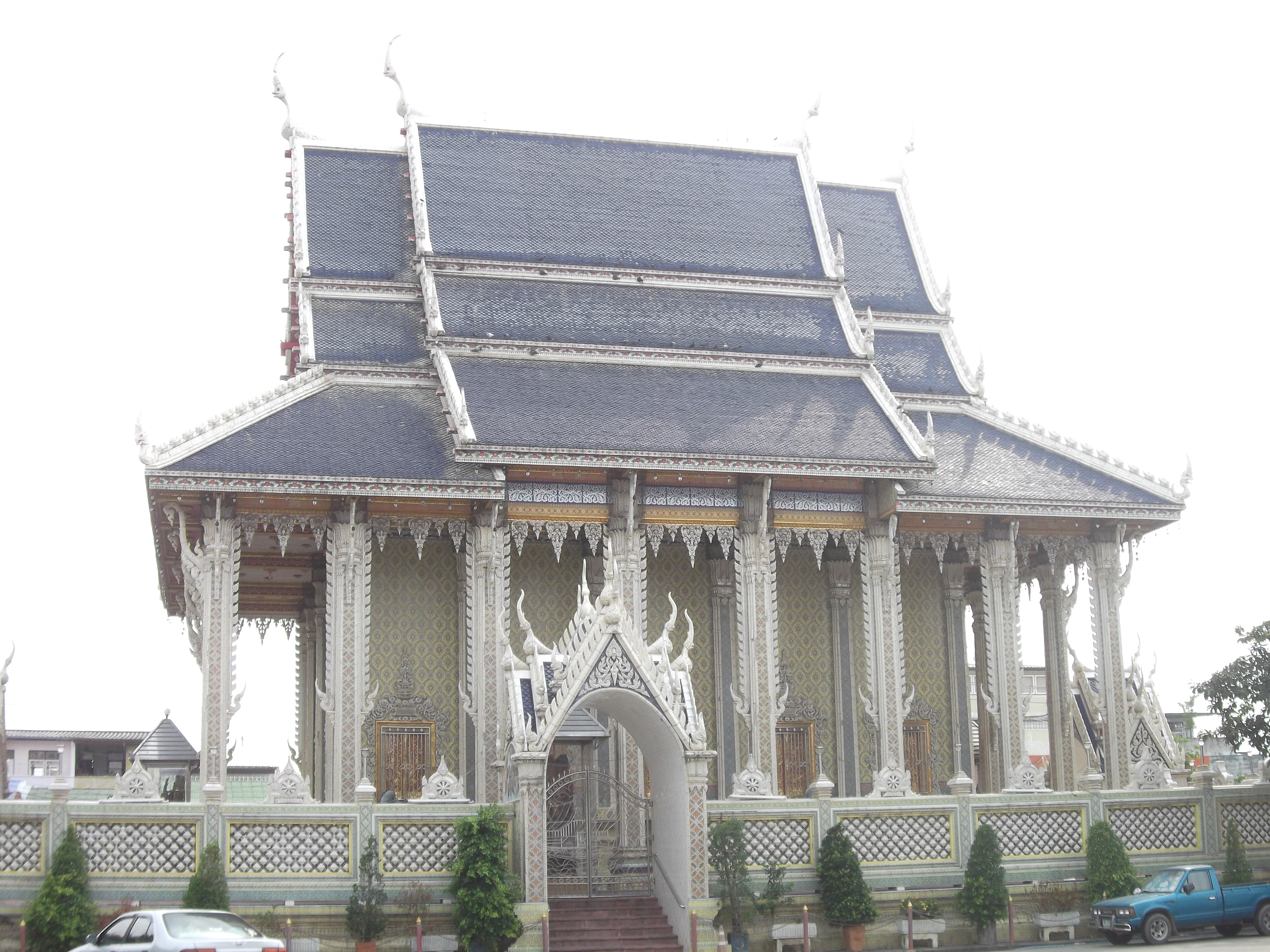
- The modern ubosot

- Location within Bangkok

Religion
- Affiliation: Buddhism
- Sect: Theravāda Mahā Nikāya
- Status: Civil temple

Location
- Location: 11 Soi Ekkachai 23, Ekkachai rd, Bang Khun Thian, Chom Thong, Bangkok 10150
- Country: Thailand
- Interactive map of Wat Sai
- Coordinates: 13.69034°N 100.457632°E

Architecture
- Completed: 1703

Wat Sai (Thai: วัดไทร, formerly spelled วัดไซ, pronounced [wát sāj]) is an old Buddhist temple in Bangkok.

== History ==
It was created in 1703 during the Ayutthaya period, but the name of the founder is not known. It belongs to the Mahā Nikāya branch of Buddhism.

In 1708, the temple received the Wisungkhamsima and was officially promoted as a community place of worship.

== Highlights ==
Wat Sai is considered one of the famed temples in the Chom Thong area, along with nearby Wat Nang Nong and Wat Ratchaorot.

There are many interesting Buddha images housed inside vihara (sanctuary).

Another interesting attraction is Tamnak Thong (ตำหนักทอง, lit. 'gold painted mansion'), kindly dedicated by King Sanphet VIII. The 29th king of Ayutthaya, more commonly known as Phra Chao Suea (พระเจ้าเสือ, lit. 'tiger king'). (Note: Although most believe that it was the place where King Sanphet VIII stayed while on a fishing trip in the Ayutthaya period. But from the study of expert archaeologists, it was found that it was a building with architecture from the Rattanakosin period. However, it did not change the fact that it was related to King Sanphet VIII in any way.) As the name implies, the wooden house was decorated with gold painting on black resin lacquer and some parts were probably cover with gold leaves. There is also an old ubosot (ordination hall) built in the Ayutthaya style and it has been maintained in its original style.

Adjacent to the old ubosot that was built with ceramics in Rattanakosin style. Combination of splendors between two styles of equally spectacular arts from two different periods.

=== Wat Sai floating market ===
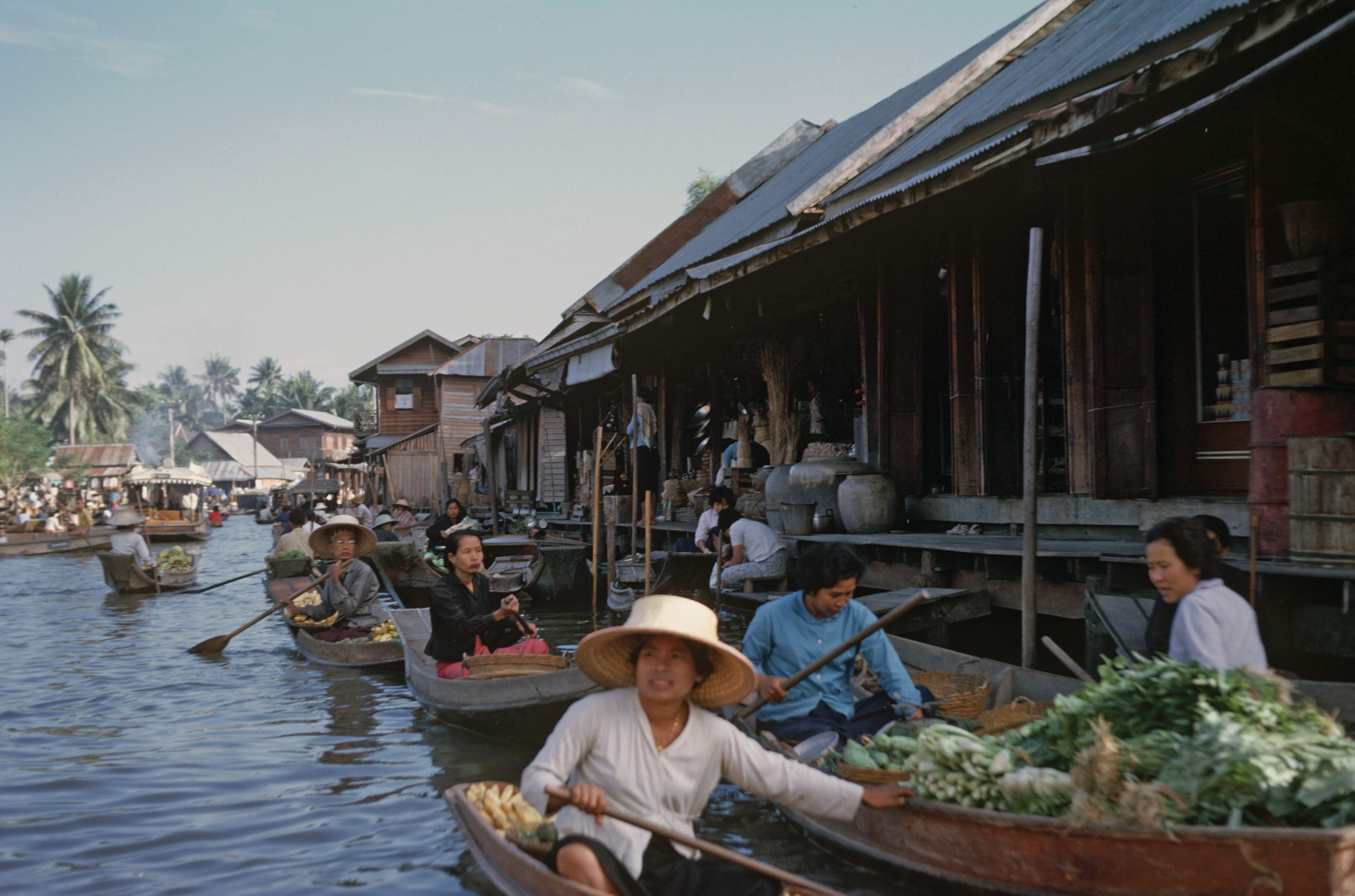
Wat Sai Floating Market in 1963

Beside the temple next to Khlong Dan canal lies the site of Wat Sai floating market. Once a bustling hub, it was where farmers sold their goods from boats and was regarded as the largest and most famous floating market of its time in the central region. In its heyday, merchants would row their boats here from faraway places such as Bang Khae, Bang Ramat, and even Bang Chang or Damnoen Saduak, thanks to an interconnected network of waterways. The market was lively and colourful, and among the local specialties sold was the renowned Bang Mot tangerines. Originally, the market was located at Wat Ratchaorot, which at the time was the true centre of Bang Khun Thian, so much so that even the district office stood along the canal. Later, the market was relocated to Wat Sai, as large numbers of visitors began arriving by train. When the train stopped on the bridge to let passengers on and off, it created a high risk of accidents. In late 1964, King Bhumibol Adulyadej (Rama IX) brought the Japanese Crown Prince Akihito and Princess Michiko (later Emperor Akihito and Empress Michiko) to visit the market as well.

Wat Sai floating market began to decline around 1977, as many parts of the waterways were blocked by multiple water gates, making navigation increasingly difficult, and at the same time land transportation improved. Today, its status as a floating market has vanished entirely, giving way to a lively morning land market. The only reminder of its glorious past is a wooden nameplate still hanging above the market entrance.

== Gallery ==
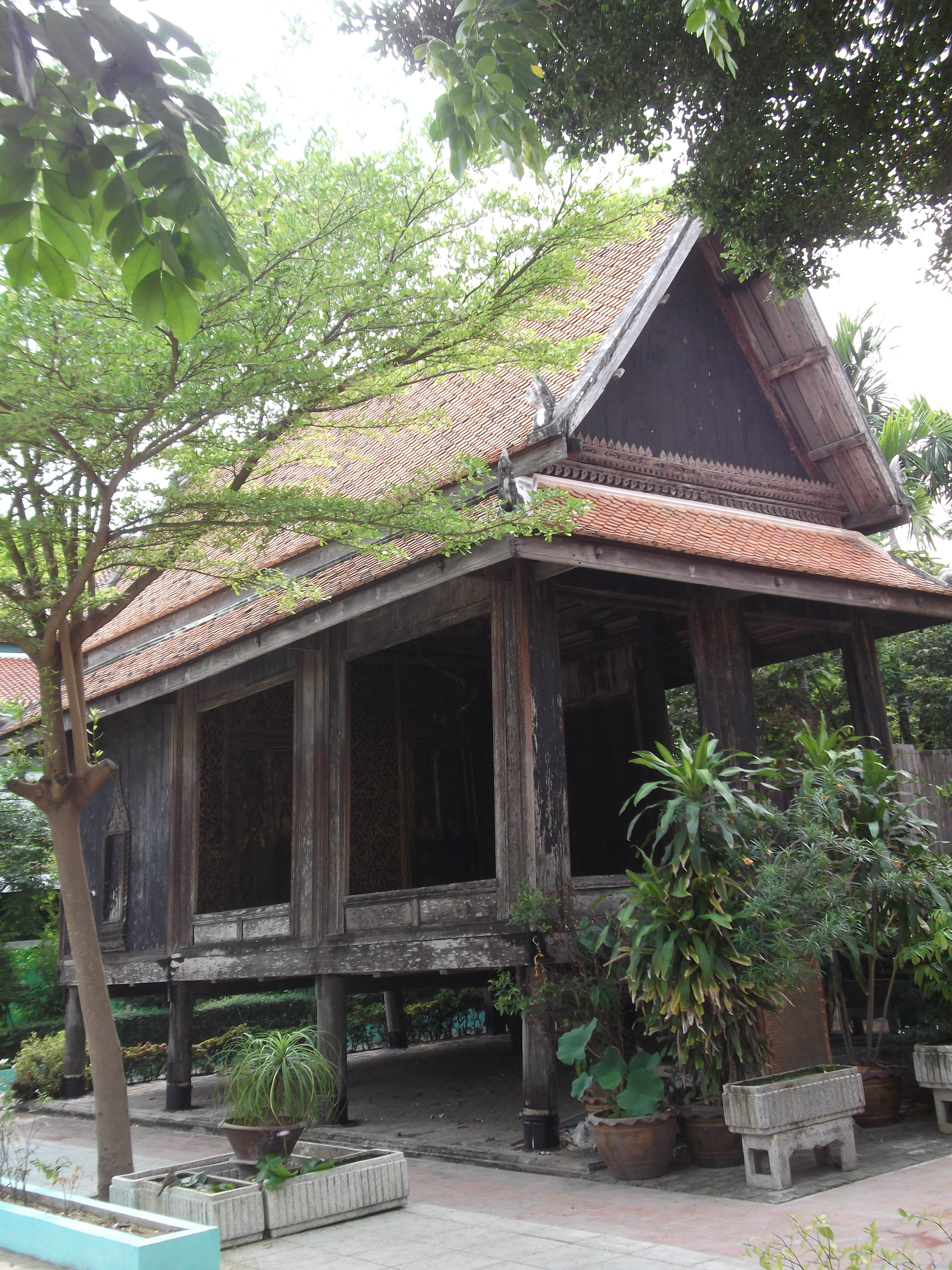
Tamnak Thong of King Sanphet VIII

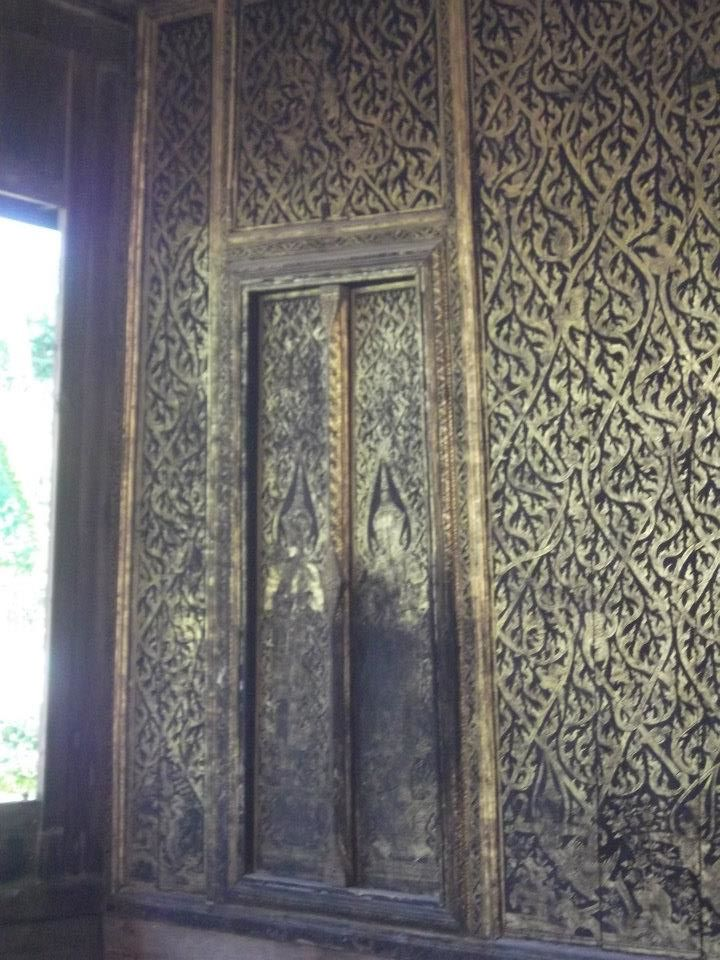
Inside the Tamnak Thong

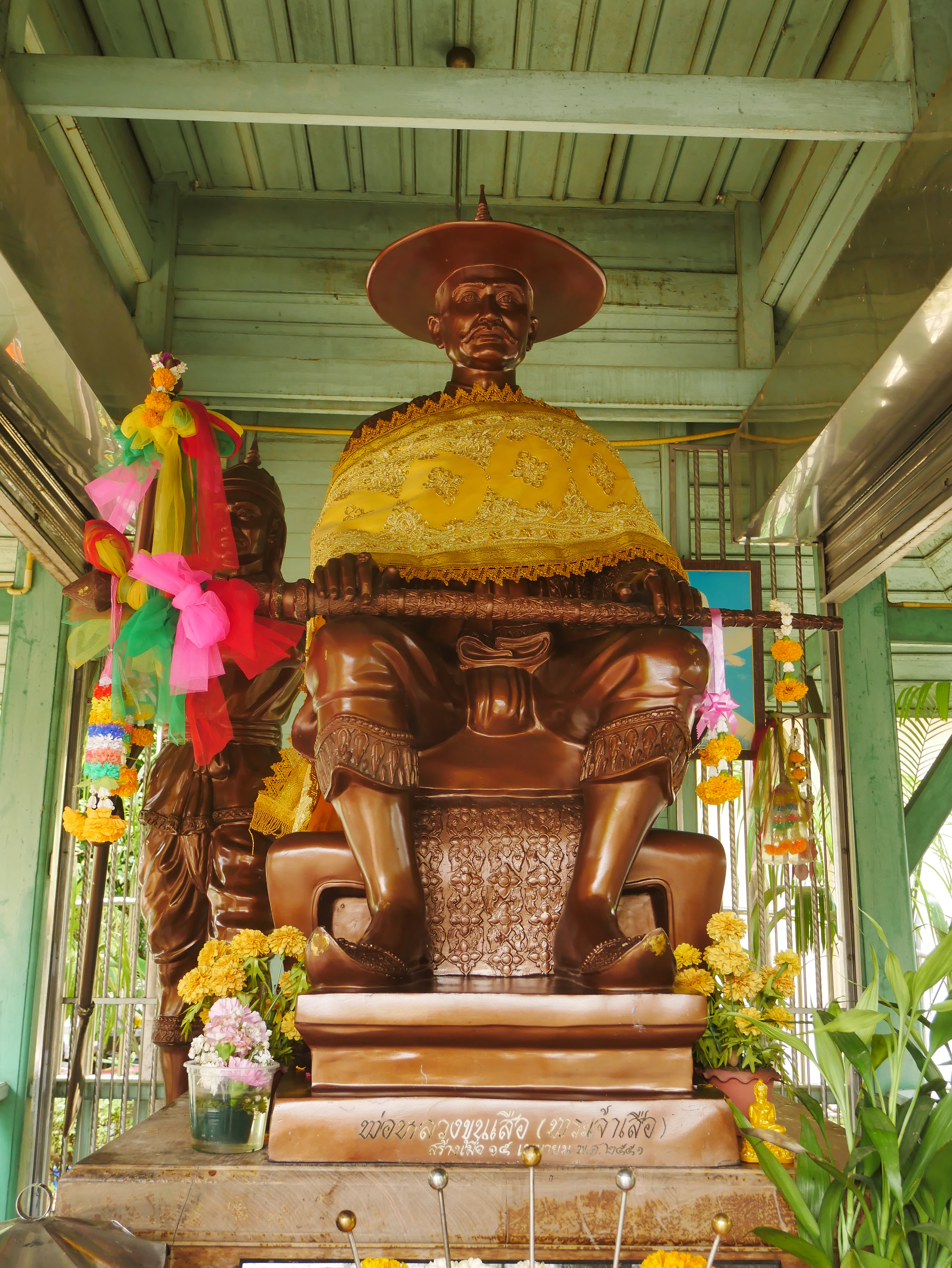
King Sanphet VIII statue

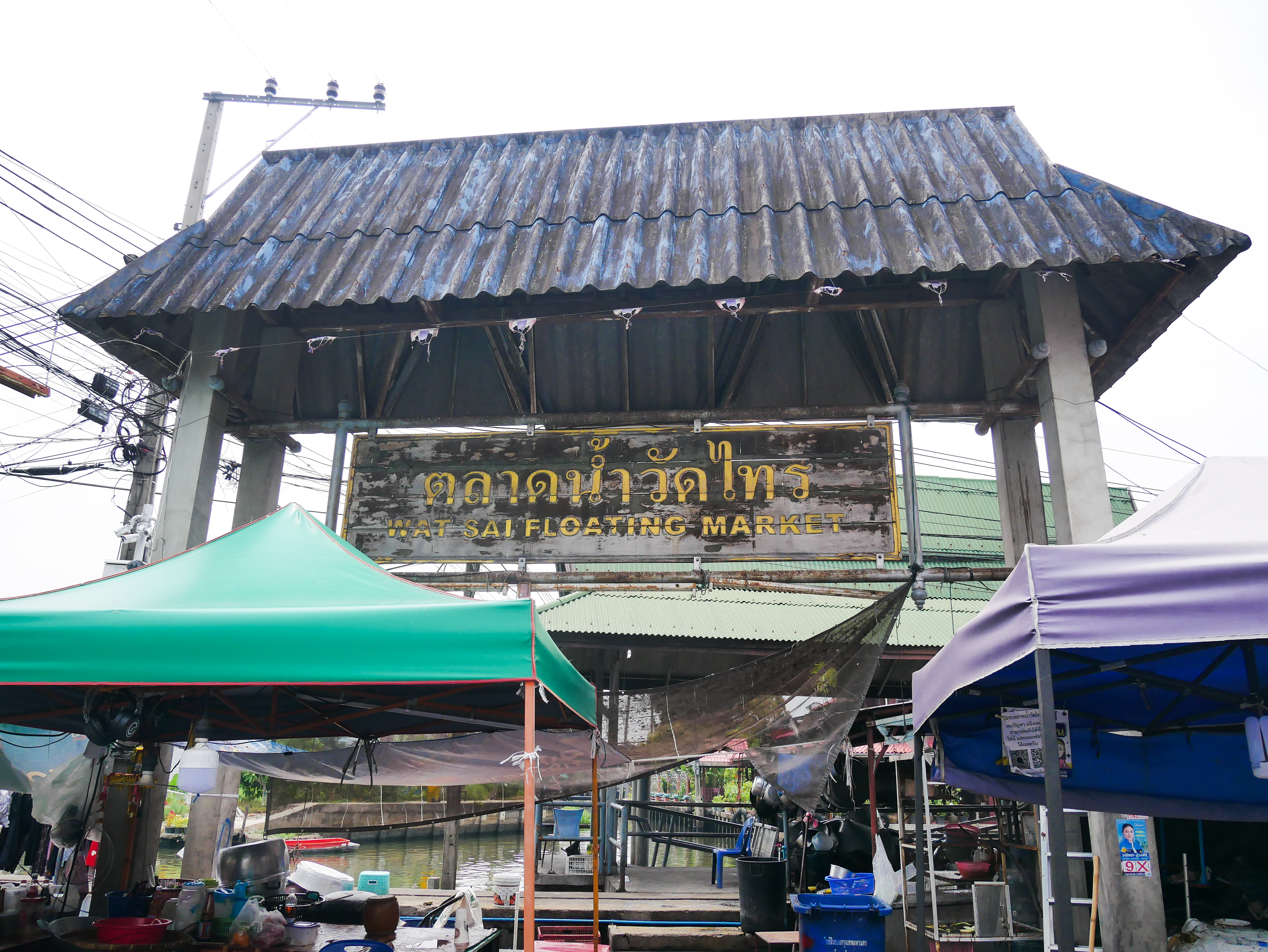
Nameplate of Wat Sai floating market

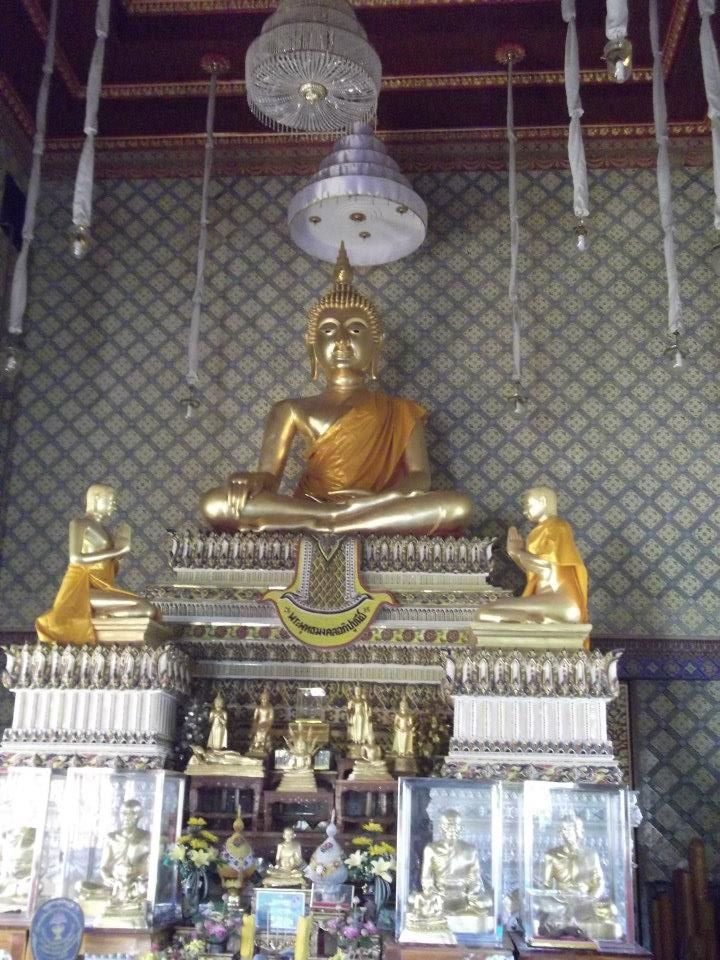
Principle Buddha image

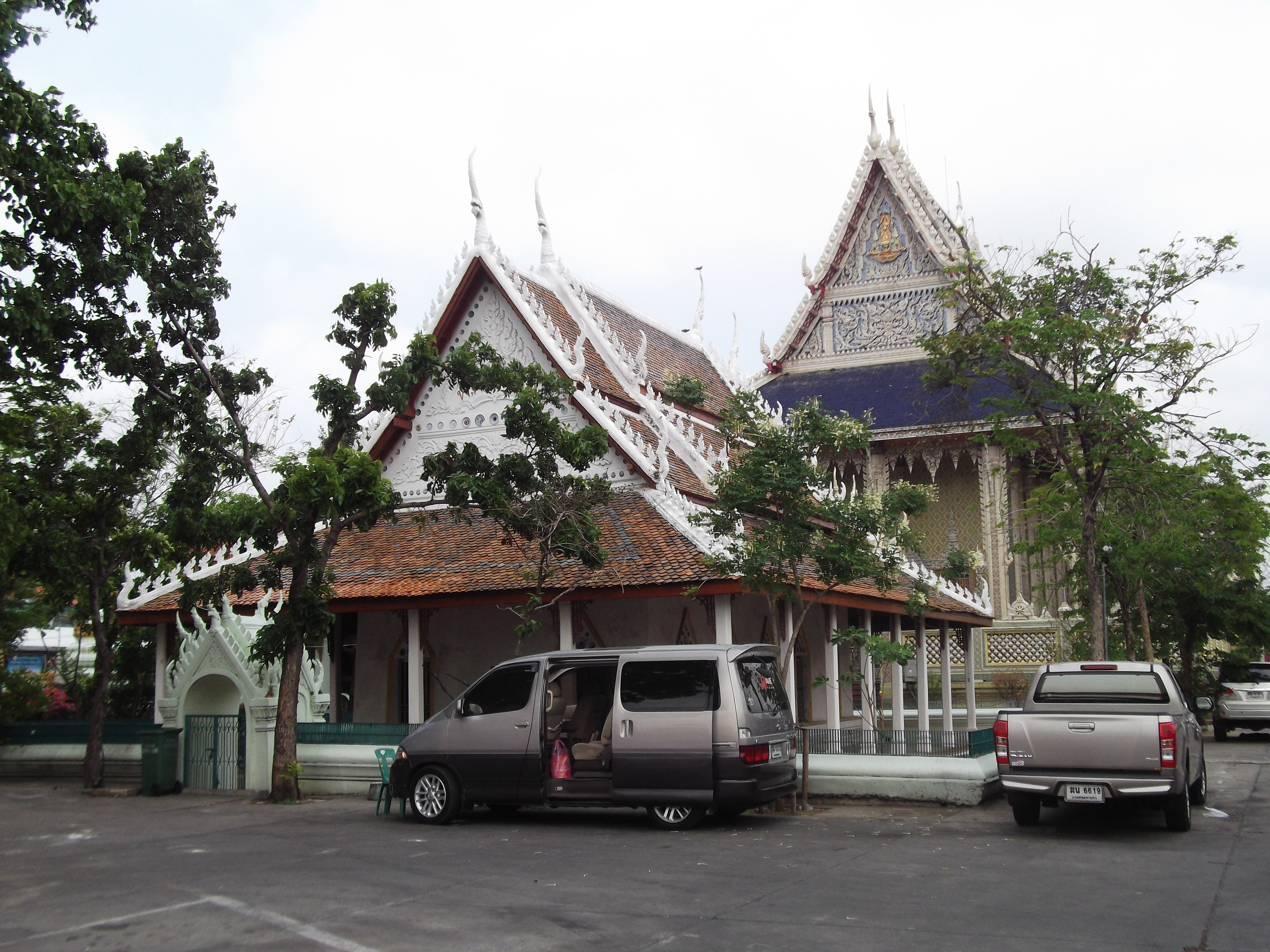
The old ubosot is in front of the modern ubosot
