= Bang Mot, Chom Thong =

Bang Mot บางมด
- Khwaeng
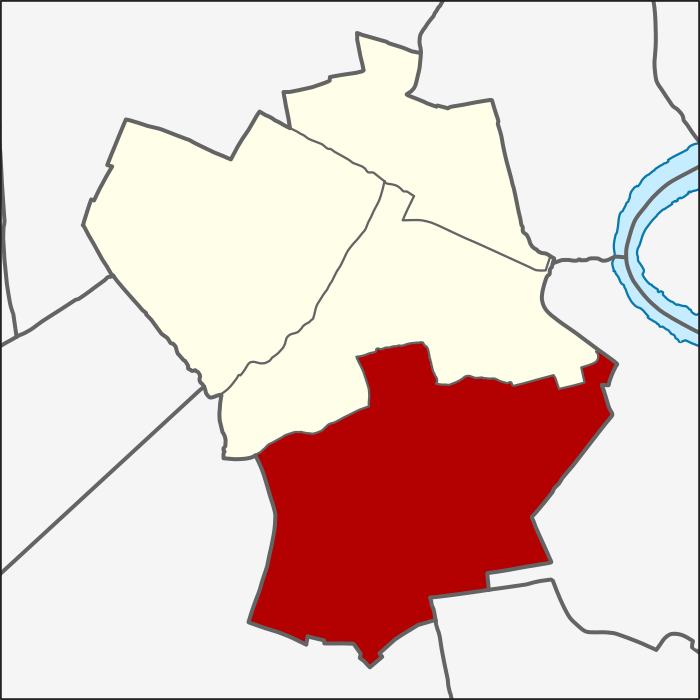
- Location in Chom Thong district
- Country: Thailand
- Province: Bangkok
- Khet: Chom Thong

Area
  - Total: 11.918 km^{2} (4.602 sq mi)

Population (2020)
  - Total: 44,424
- Time zone: UTC+7 (ICT)
- Postal code: 10150
- TIS 1099: 103503

Bang Mot (Thai: บางมด, pronounced [bāːŋ mót]) is a khwaeng (subdistrict) of Chom Thong district, in Bangkok, Thailand. In 2020, it had a total population of 44,424 people.
