= Chom Thong subdistrict, Bangkok =

Chom Thong จอมทอง
- Khwaeng
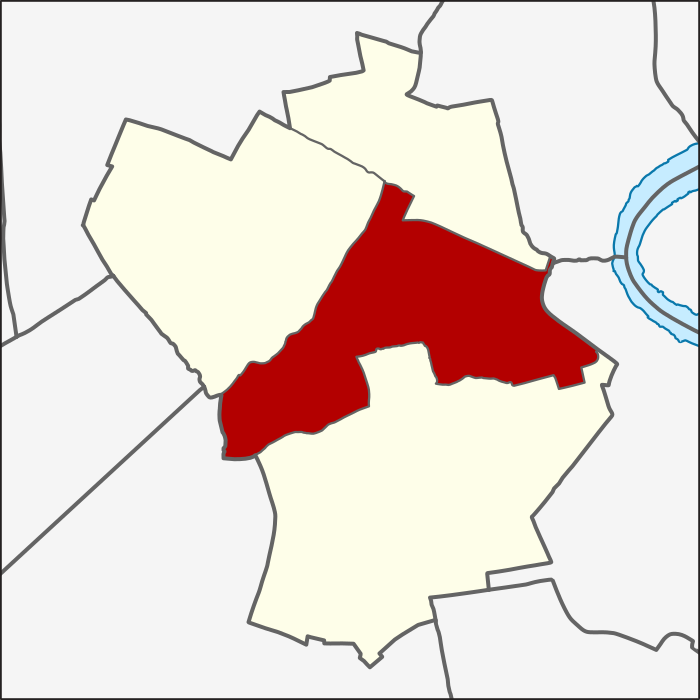
- Location in Chom Thong district
- Country: Thailand
- Province: Bangkok
- Khet: Chom Thong

Area
  - Total: 5.183 km^{2} (2.001 sq mi)

Population (2020)
  - Total: 33,232
- Time zone: UTC+7 (ICT)
- Postal code: 10150
- TIS 1099: 103504

Chom Thong (Thai: จอมทอง, pronounced [t͡ɕɔ̄ːm tʰɔ̄ːŋ]) is a khwaeng (subdistrict) of Chom Thong district, in Bangkok, Thailand. In 2020, it had a total population of 33,232 people.
