= Wat Nang Nong =

Wat Nang Nong Worawihan
- Wat Nang Nong
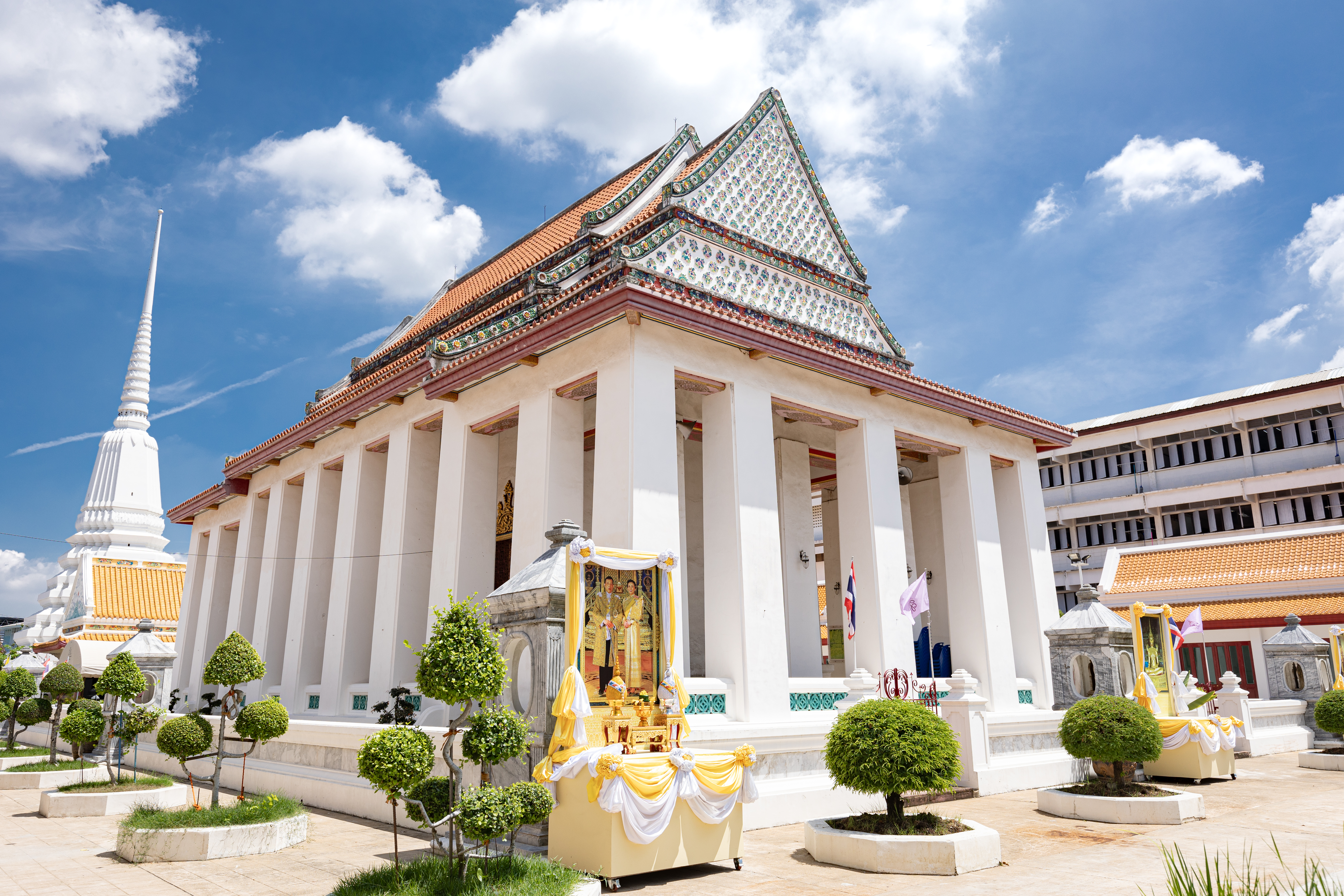
- The ubosot

- Location within Bangkok

Religion
- Affiliation: Buddhism
- Sect: Theravāda Mahā Nikāya
- Status: Third class royal monastery

Location
- Location: 76 Wutthakat rd, Bang Kho, Chom Thong, Bangkok 10150
- Country: Thailand
- Interactive map of Wat Nang Nong Worawihan
- Coordinates: 13.703417°N 100.466376°E

Wat Nang Nong Worawihan (Thai: วัดนางนองวรวิหาร), often shortened to Wat Nang Nong is a historical Thai Buddhist temple in Bangkok. Located in the vicinity of well known Wat Ratchaorot, Khlong Dan or Khlong Sanam Chai canal runs through the western area.

== History ==
According to the style of art of the objects found in the temple dates back to the Ayutthaya period. A large-scale restroration work was carried out during the King Rama III of early Rattanakosin period after which time it was consecrated a royal temple.

The king himself came to the temple by boat in 1841, to perform a ritual over the bai sena (temple boundary stone) in the ubosot (ordination hall).

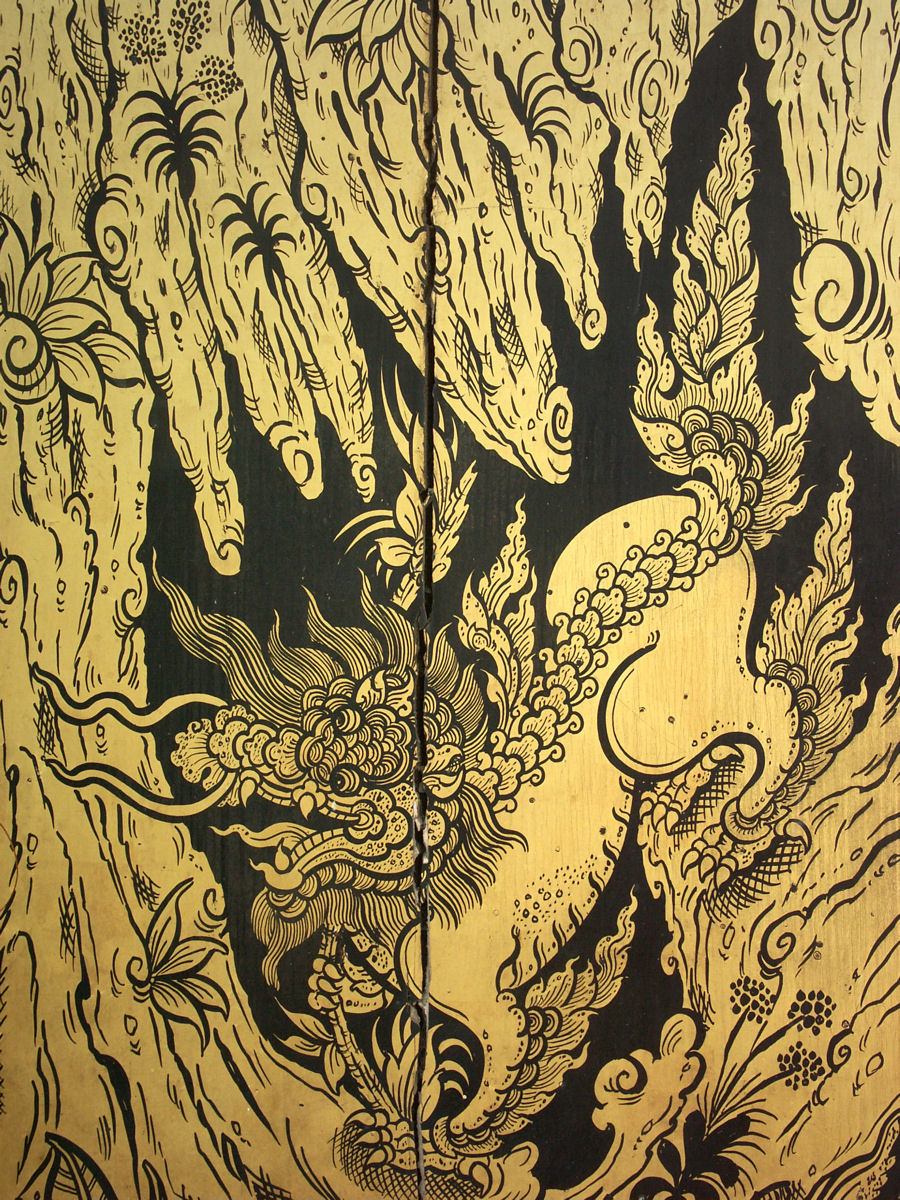
Lai rot nam

The principal Buddha image inside the ubosot is Buddha image in royal gear seated in the subduing Mara posture named Phra Phuttha Maha Chakkraphat (พระพุทธมหาจักรพรรดิ, lit "the great emperor Buddha"), representing the Sukhothai art style. Inside the ubosot there are multi media art techniques, namely paintings with lai rot nam (Thai gilded lacquer) relating classic Chinese literature Romance of the Three Kingdoms.

The temple collecting includes a number of objects created in the styles of both Chinese and European art.

Wat Nang Nong has been registered as a national ancient monument by the Fine Arts Department since 1977.

== Toponymy ==
No one knows what Nang Nong translates or means. Independent historian Sujit Wongthes assumed that it must have been distorted from the word Bang Nam Nong, meaning "inundation place".
