= Khlong Sanam Chai =

Canal connecting Bangkok and Samut Sakhon, Thailand

Coordinates: 13.5809°N 100.3635°E

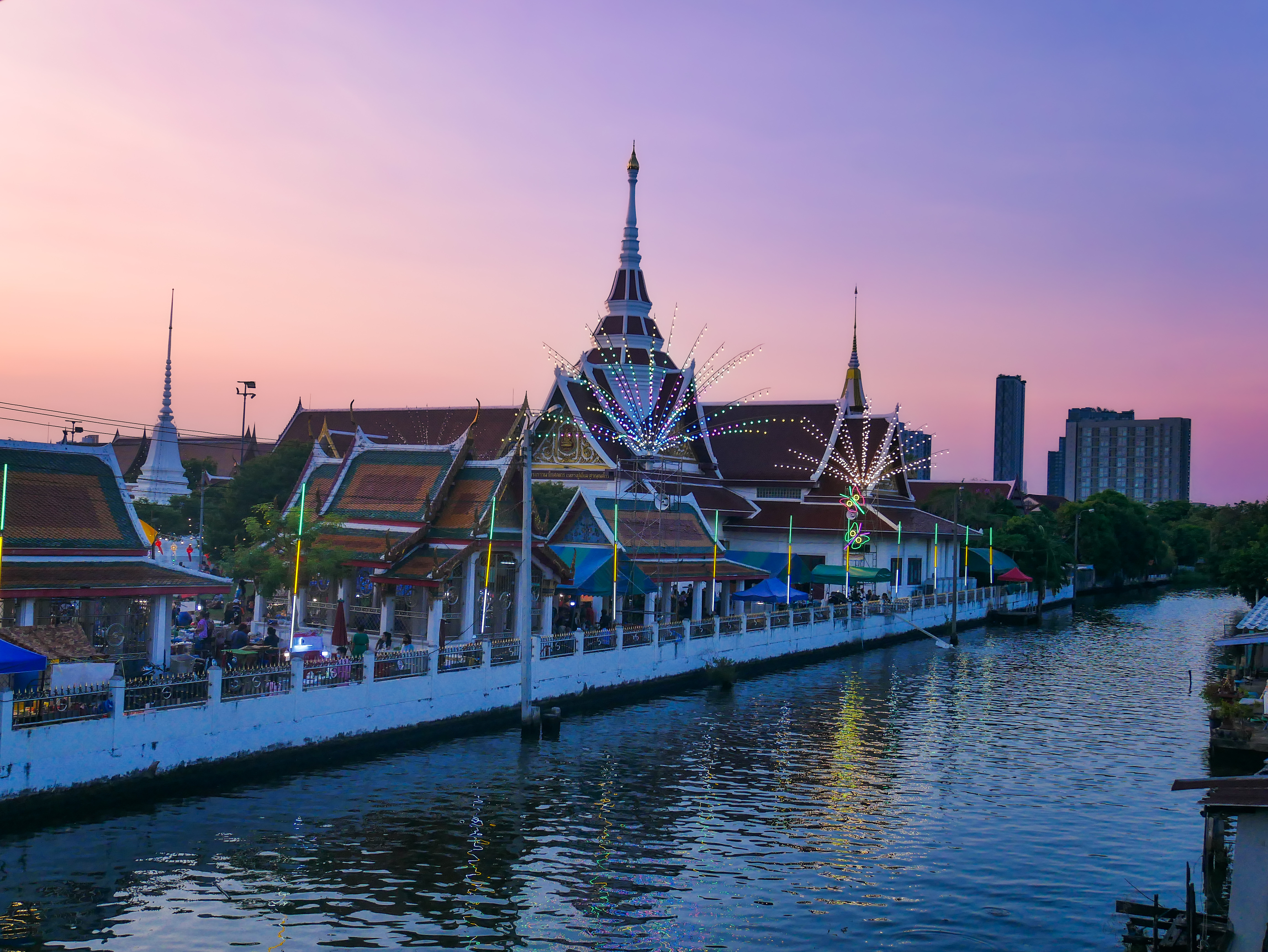
- Wat Nang and Khlong Sanam Chai
- Interactive map of Khlong Sanam Chai

Specifications
- Length: 30 km (19 miles)

History
- Construction began: 1705
- Date completed: 1721

Geography
- Start point: Bangkok
- End point: Samut Sakhon
- Connects to: Khlong Bangkok Yai, Khlong Dao Khanong, Khlong Khok Kham, Tha Chin river

Khlong Sanam Chai (Thai: คลองสนามชัย, pronounced [kʰlɔ̄ːŋ sā.nǎːm t͡ɕʰāj]) and Khlong Mahachai (คลองมหาชัย, [kʰlɔ̄ːŋ mā.hǎːt͡ɕʰāj]) are names of a khlong (canal) in Thailand, which links the Chao Phraya River in Bangkok's Thonburi side to the Tha Chin River river in Samut Sakhon Province.

Its beginning separates from Khlong Bangkok Yai in front of Wat Apson Sawan between Phasi Charoen and Thon Buri districts, where it is referred to as Khlong Dan (คลองด่าน, [kʰlɔ̄ːŋ dàːn]), then flows down south to meet Khlong Bang Khun Thian and Khlong Dao Khanong at Khlong Bang Khun Thian confluence in Chom Thong district and flows continuously south up till it meets the Tha Chin River in the area of Amphoe Mueang Samut Sakhon, Samut Sakhon Province. Its total length is about 30 km (19 mi). Sanam Chai is the name given to Bangkok portion of the canal, which is known as Mahachai in Samut Sakhon.

For the Khlong Dan part, it is believed that it is a natural canal that has existed since the Ayutthaya period. In the part of the Khlong Sanam Chai or Khlong Mahachai is a canal that was excavated in the King Sanphet VIII's reign during middle of the late Ayutthaya period to serve as a water transportation route instead of the more winding Khlong Khok Kham. The digging was completed in the year 1721 during the King Sanphet IX's reign, with Dutch experts in charge of the excavation.

Its name is also the origin of the name Mahachai, which is the informal name for Samut Sakhon province. In the early Rattanakosin period, it was also used as a route to move the Siamese army.

"Kaem Ling Khlong Mahachai-Khlong Sanam Chai Project" is a royally-initiated project of the King Bhumibol Adulyadej (Rama IX). By constructing necessary regulators across the canals with pumping station, this "Kaem Ling" (monkey cheek) would work to collect and store flood water from upper area into Khlong Mahachai or Khlong Sanam Chai and drain out to the sea via Khlong Mahachai, Khlong Khun Racha Pinitjai, and canals connecting Khlong Mahachai to the sea. This royal project was established to solve the problem of urban flooding. Covering a total area of 76.42 km^{2} (29.50 mi^{2}) of Bangkok and provinces of Samut Sakhon with Nakhon Pathom.

Bordering historic temples the canal apart from Wat Apson Sawan include Wat Paknam Bhasicharoen, Wat Nang Chi, Wat Khun Chan, Wat Ratchaorot, Wat Nang, Wat Nangnong, Wat Sai and its floating market, Wat Sing, Wat Kamphaeng, Wat Kok, Wat Tha Kham, Wat Bang Kradi, Wat Hua Krabue, Wat Ban Rai Charoenpon, and Phan Thai Norasing Shrine, etc.

Fort Wichien Chodok, a fortress built in the King Nangklao (Rama III)'s reign at the mouth of the canal where it confluence with the Tha Chin river to prevent the invasion of Annamese from the case of Anuwong's rebellion.

== See more ==
- Phan Thai Norasing
