= Bang Khun Thian subdistrict =

Subdistrict in Chom Thong district, Bangkok, Thailand

Coordinates: 13.6967°N 100.4572°E

Bang Khun Thian บางขุนเทียน
- Khwaeng
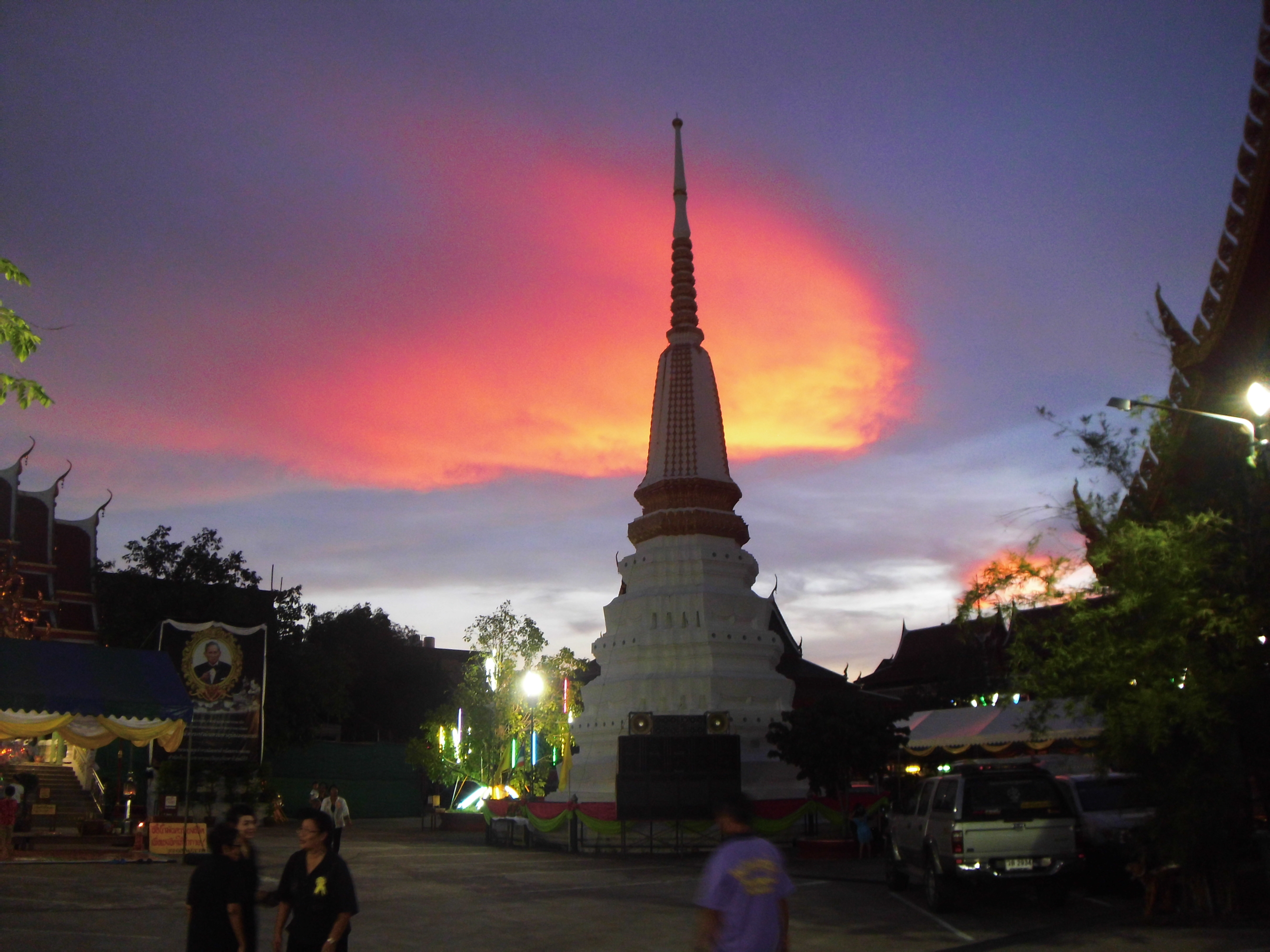
- Chedi of Wat Kaeo Phaithun, formerly known as Wat Bang Prathun Nai the local historic temple

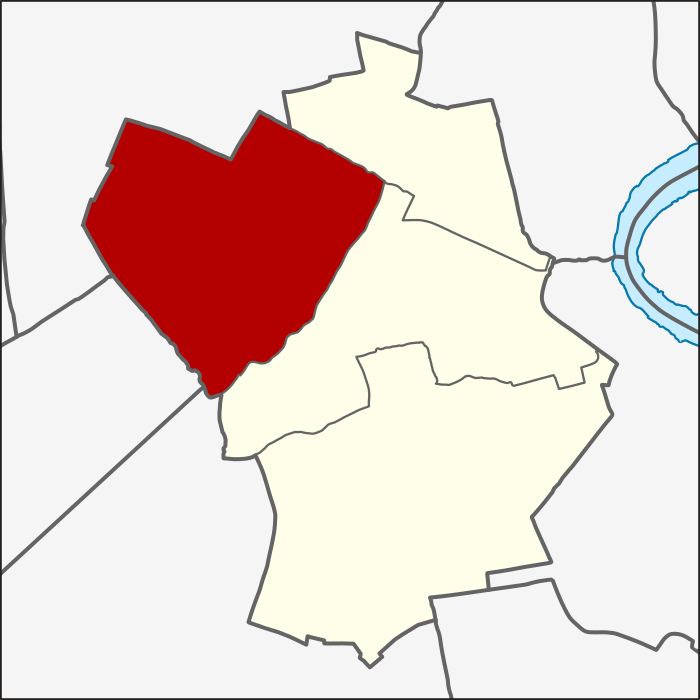
- Location in Chom Thong District
- Country: Thailand
- Province: Bangkok
- Khet: Chom Thong

Area
  - Total: 5.789 km^{2} (2.235 sq mi)

Population (2020)
  - Total: 35,779
- Time zone: UTC+7 (ICT)
- Postal code: 10150
- TIS 1099: 103501

Bang Khun Thian (Thai: บางขุนเทียน, pronounced [bāːŋ kʰǔn tʰīa̯n]) is a khwaeng (sub-district) of Chom Thong district, Bangkok.

== History ==
Bang Khun Thian is named after Khlong Bang Khun Thian, a canal that flows through the area.

The origin of the name "Bang Khun Thian" is unclear. It may have been distorted from the words "Bang Khun Thiam" or "Bang Khun Kwian", as the area was once a resting place for the kwian (wagons) of travelers or caravans. Another theory suggests that it was named after a nobleman, "Khun Thian" (ขุนเทียน), who oversaw the area and its surroundings.

In the past, Bang Khun Thian covered a wide area extending to Bangkok Bay (the upper Gulf of Thailand). However, following the new zoning by the Bangkok Metropolitan Administration (BMA) in 1989, Chom Thong became a separate district, and Bang Khun Thian was incorporated into this newly established district.

Wat Sai floating market, originally located along Khlong Dan or Khlong Sanam Chai, was a very popular and famous floating market in the 1960s, promoted as a tourist destination by the government of Field Marshal Sarit Thanarat. It has now completely closed.

== Geography ==
Bang Khun Thian is regarded as the northwest part of the district, with a total area of 5.789 km^{2} (2.235 mi^{2}).

The area is bounded by other sub-districts (from north clockwise): Bang Wa in Phasi Charoen District, Bang Kho in its district (Khlong Bang Prathun, Khlong Ta Cham, Khlong Rang Bua, Khlong Suan Luang Tai, Khlong Bang Wa are the borderlines), Chom Thong in its district (Khlong Sanam Chai is a borderline), Chom Thong in its district, Samae Dam in Bang Khun Thian District (Khlong Sanam Chai and Khlong Wat Sing are the borderlines), Khlong Bang Phran in Bang Bon District, Bang Wa in Phasi Charoen District (Khlong Wat Sing and Khlong Bang Ranae are the borderlines).

== Population ==
In 2018 it had a population of 36,479 people.

== Transportation ==
Wutthakat and Ekkachai Roads are the main routes of the sub-district.

Bang Khun Thian can also be reached by train via the Maeklong Railway that passes through the area.

While the canals that cross through the area can still serve as a thoroughfare as in the past.
