= Wat Ratchaorasaram =

Ancient Buddhist temple in Bangkok

- วัดราชโอรส
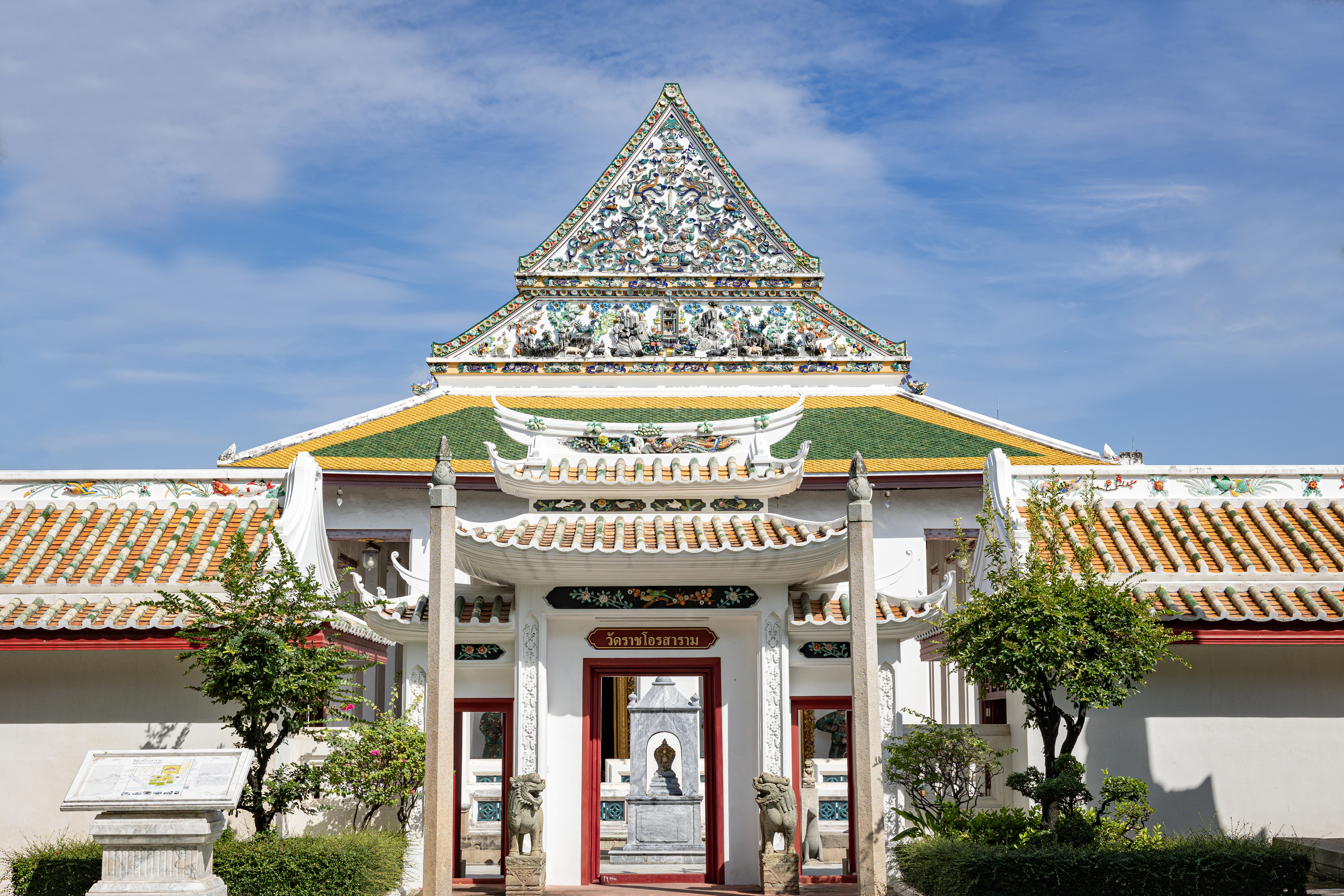
- Wat Ratchaorasaram

- Location within Bangkok

Religion
- Affiliation: Buddhism
- Sect: Theravāda Mahā Nikāya
- Status: First class royal temple

Location
- Location: 285 Soi Ekkachai 4, Ekkachai rd, Bang Kho, Chom Thong, Bangkok 10150
- Country: Thailand
- Interactive map of Wat Ratchaorasaram
- Coordinates: 13.702838°N 100.464423°E

Wat Ratchaorasaram (Thai: วัดราชโอรสารามราชวรวิหาร), often called shortened to Wat Ratchaorot (วัดราชโอรส) is an ancient Thai Buddhist temple in Bangkok.

This first class royal monastery formerly known as Wat Chom Thong (วัดจอมทอง) or Wat Kong Thong (วัดกองทอง). The name "Chom Thong" is also the origin of the name of the district where it is located, Chom Thong. Wat Ratchaorot is known as the most beautiful and outstanding temple in the vicinity and also the various buildings were laid out perfectly and beautifully as well.

== History ==
It is small but historically important temple was built on the western side of Khlong Dan, otherwise known as Khlong Sanam Chai in the Ayutthaya period and later appointed as the royal temple of King Nangklao (Rama III) of Chakri dynasty. The king favored the Chinese style, and this distinguishes its buildings and interiors. This is the first temple without such traditional decorations as cho fah (ช่อฟ้า, "Thai gable apex"), bai raka (ใบระกา, "toothlike ridges on the sloping edges of a gable") or hang hong (หางหงส์, "the tip of the gable looks like a mythical swan's tail"). However the Thai and Chinese styles harmonize well. Some call this temple "Wat Nok Yang" (วัดนอกอย่าง, "unconventional temple"), so that making a distinction to it during the period (early 19th century).

King Nangklao restored this temple when he was still a Prince Chetsadabodin. It was during the reign of his father, King Phutthaloetla Naphalai (Rama II) in the year 1820 during which there was a war with Burmese army. When he raised Siamese army to block the Burmese march at the Three Pagodas Pass on the western border (present-day in Kanchanaburi province). Within a day's march along the processional route and as night dawned closer, whilst soldiers were probably also weary; the royal barges had reached Wat Chom Thong and sat up the camps within the vicinity. An archway of victory's procession ritual was performed to raise soldier's morale as per customary practice reflecting the ancient belief and teaching on the art of war. However, the military intelligence was proved to be a false alarm and the prince returned with his combat units to the stronghold of the capital.

After his return, he ordered the temple to be renovated and renamed to Wat Ratchaorat, which means his own (the word ratchaorat literally means "the royal son") and dedicates it to King Phutthaloetla Naphalai.

Britain's ambassador to the royal court of King Nangklao, John Crawfurd once described this temple as "the most beautifully built in Bangkok".

== Buddha images ==
The principal Buddha image, Phra Buddha Arnunthakhun Ardulyarnbophit (พระพุทธอนันตคุณอดุลญาณบพิตร) housed inside the ubosot (ordination hall), is one of the finest of its period. The image is 3.15 m (10.3 ft) in width and 4.5 m (14.8 ft) in height. It is seated under the nine tiered parasol seen only in temples where the ashes of kings are laid to rest.

Another outstanding Buddha image is housed in the vihara (sanctuary), Phraphutthasiyard (พระพุทธไสยาสน์) or reclining Buddha image, made of stucco. The image is 20 m (65.6 ft) in length. Descriptions of traditional medicine and massage are inscribed on 42 marble plates mounted on the outer wall along the verandah.

In addition, in the northern side of the temple is a small vihara housed another important Buddha image. It is a huge standing Buddha image named Phra Si Sanphet (พระศรีสรรเพชญ์), just like the Buddha image of the same name that used to exist in the Ayutthaya kingdom. Phra Si Sanphet of Wat Ratchaorot is the art of the medieval Ayutthaya period.

== Location ==
The northern area is bordered by Khlong Bang Wa canal and it is under the jurisdiction of Chom Thong district. Khlong Dan canal flows along the eastern side of the temple. The Mahachai railway also crosses the canal where the Chom Thong halt is located.

The location of the temple was originally known as "Bang Khun Thian" and the centre of Bang Khun Thian district were also in this vicinity. Before later, a new district was divided. The temple is therefore located in the area of Chom Thong district as it is today.

== Transportation ==
Visitors can travel to the temple by air-cond affiliated bus no. 43 (Suksanari 2–Tewet) or a minibus from Talat Phlu. In addition, it is served by the Chom Thong railway halt of the State Railway of Thailand (SRT), whose Maeklong Line runs past the temple rear.

== Gallery ==
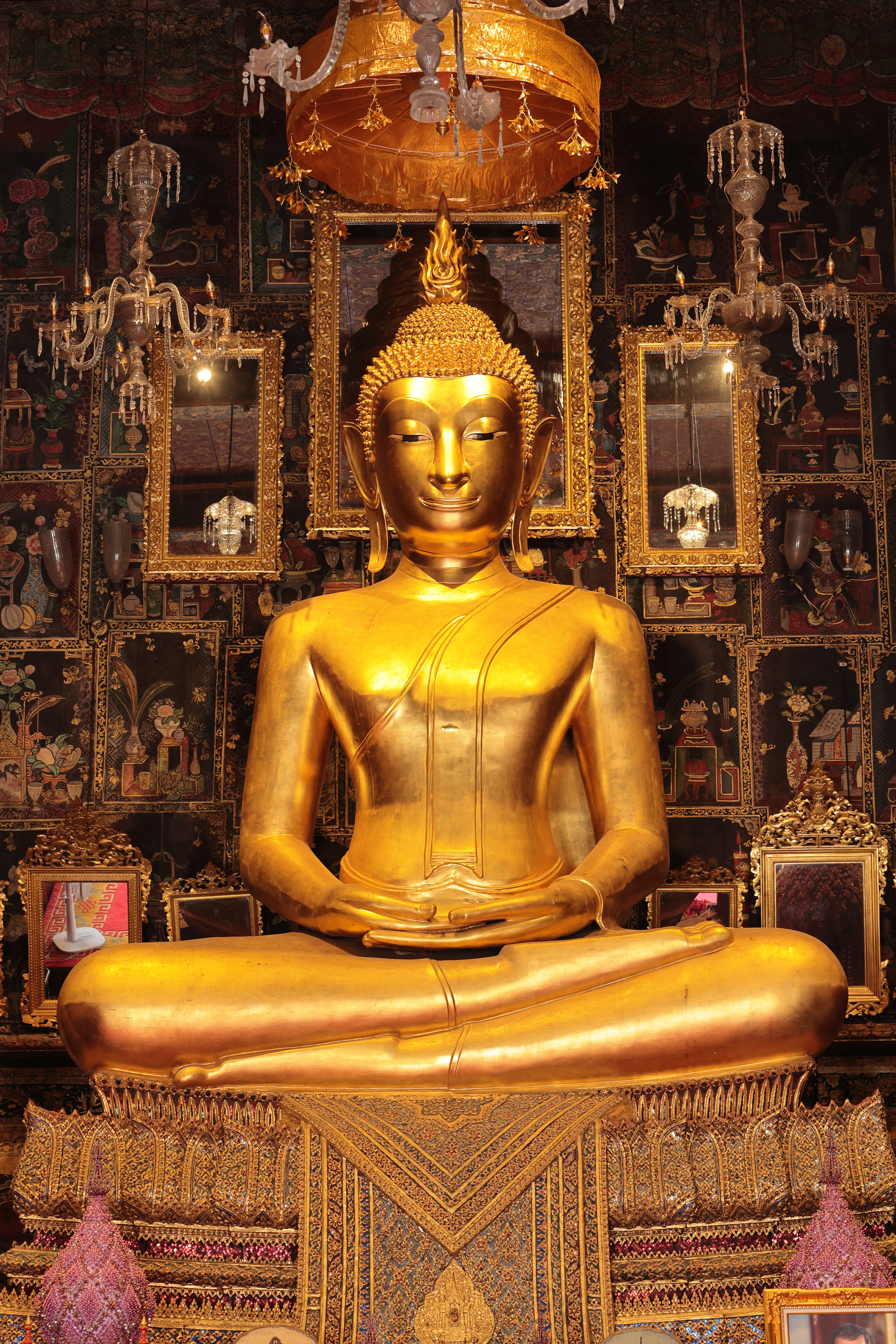
Phra Buddha Arnunthakhun Ardulyarnbophit

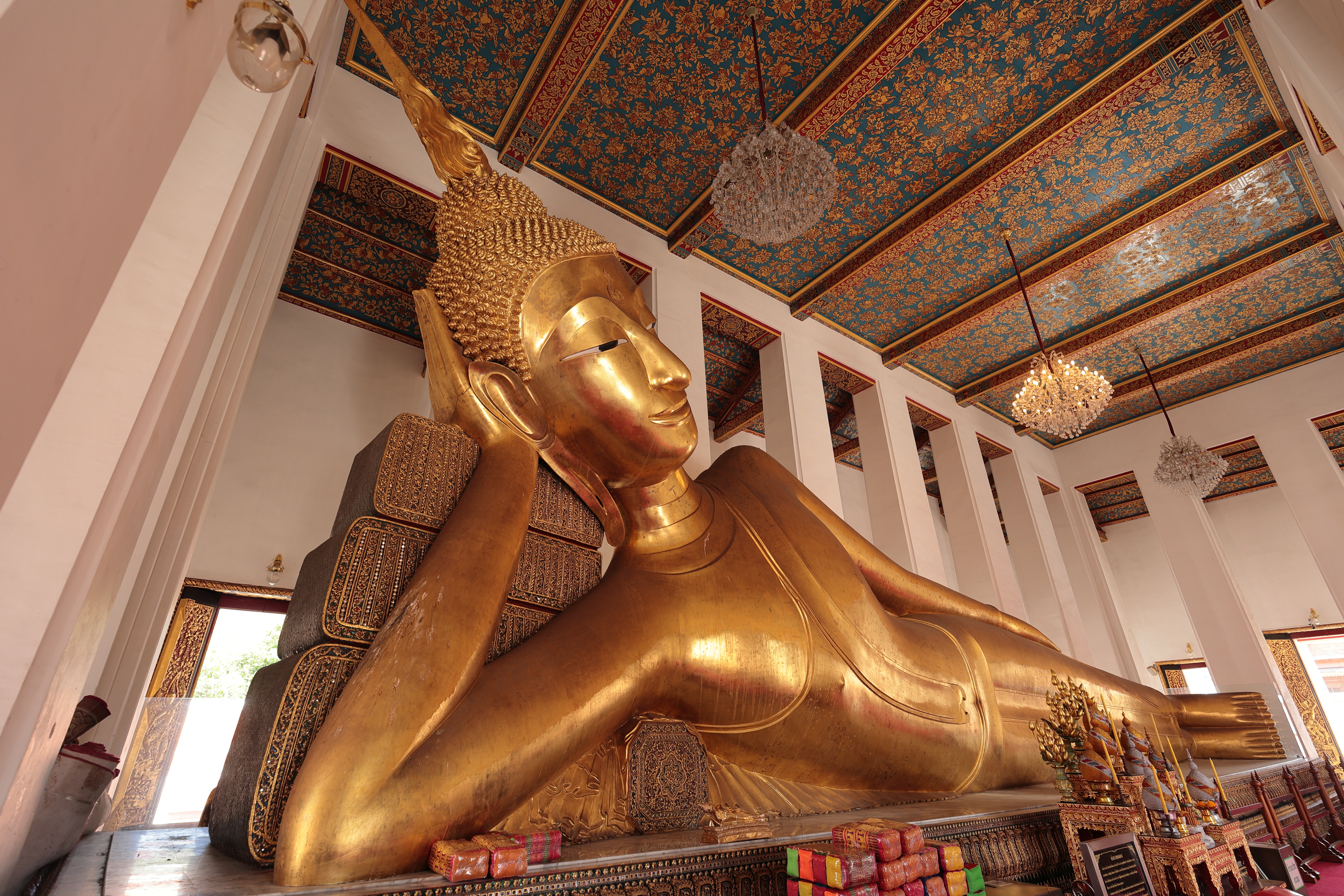
"Phraphutthasiyard" Reclining Buddha image

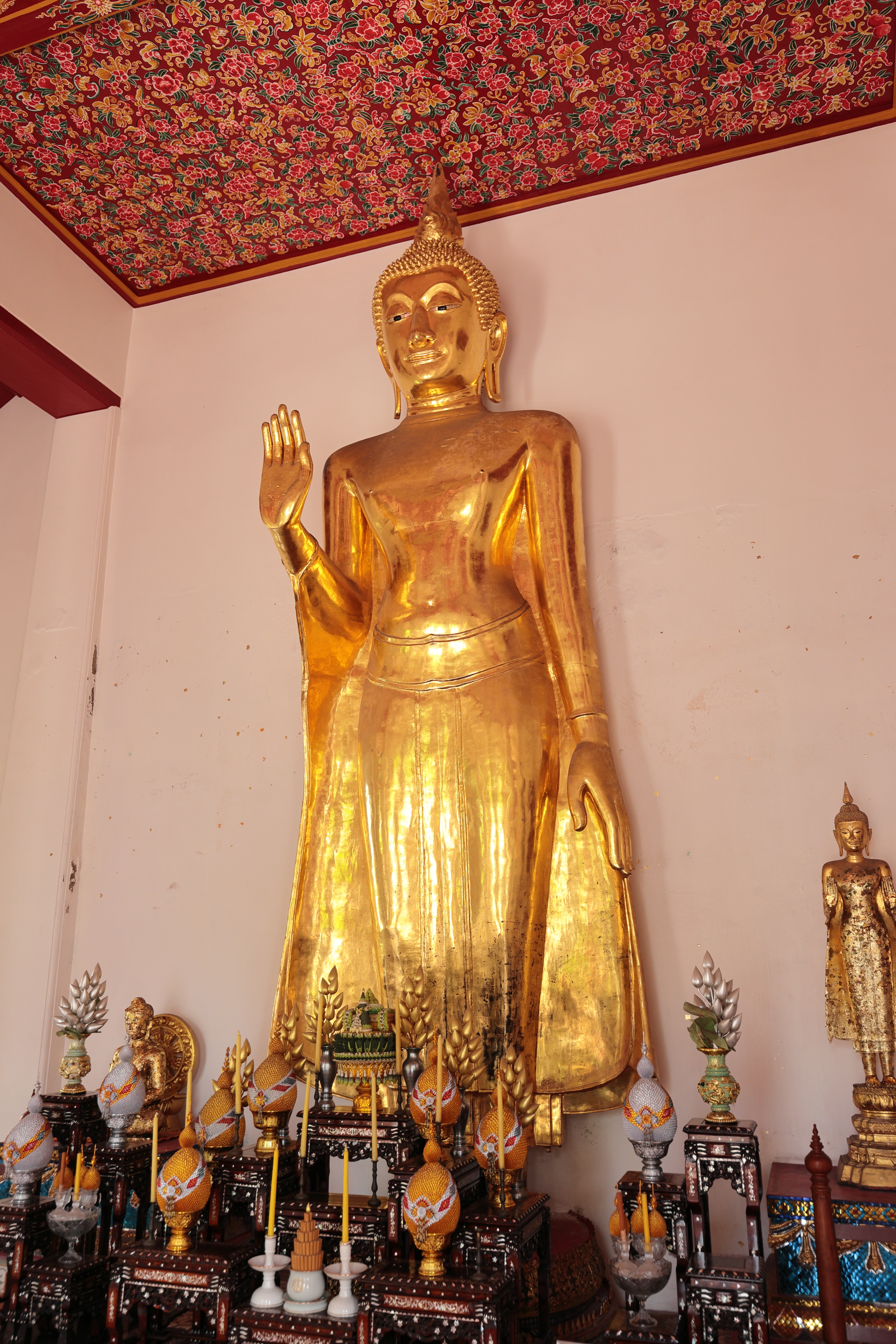
Standing Buddha image

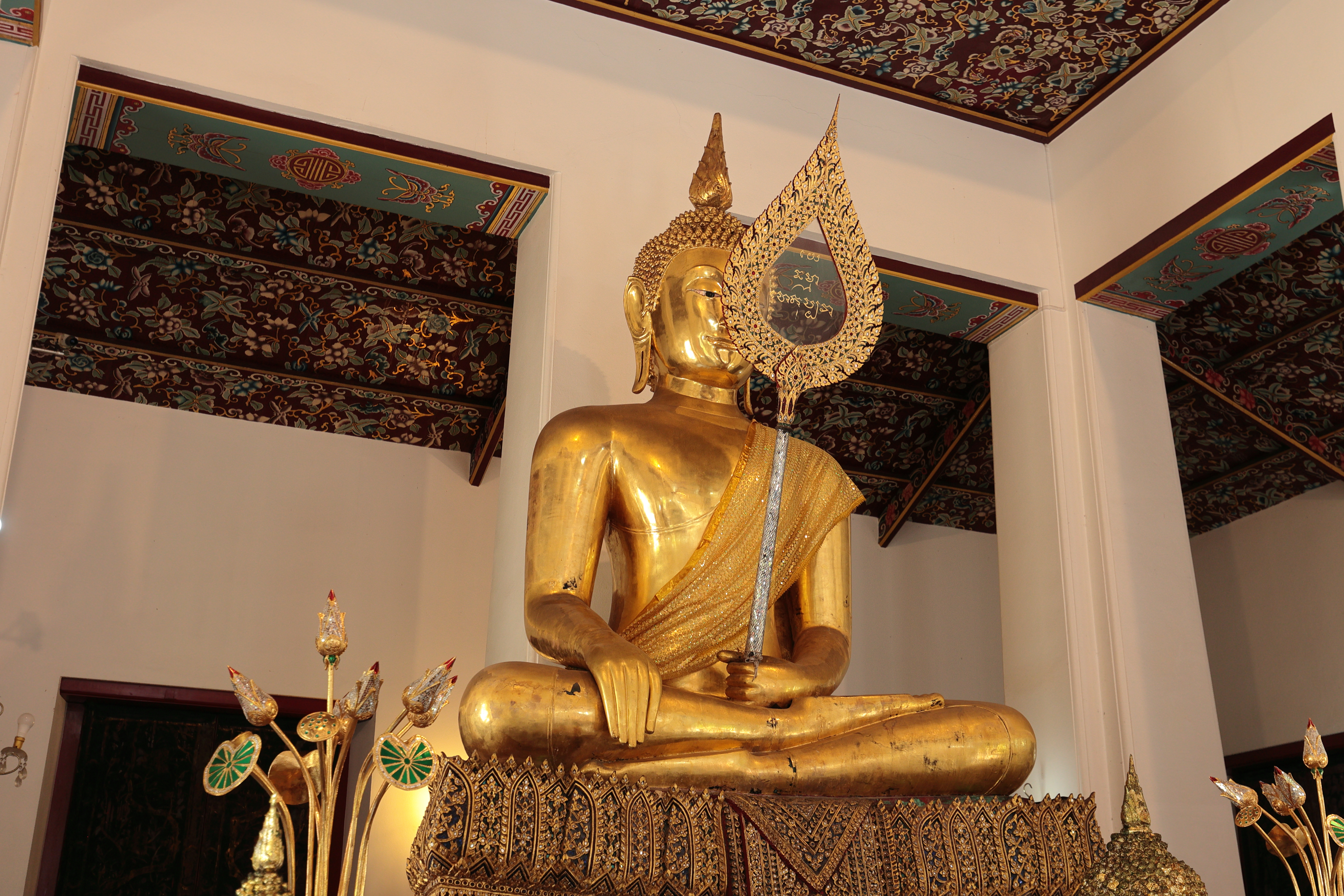
Phra Buddha Chaiyhasitthi Thummanat

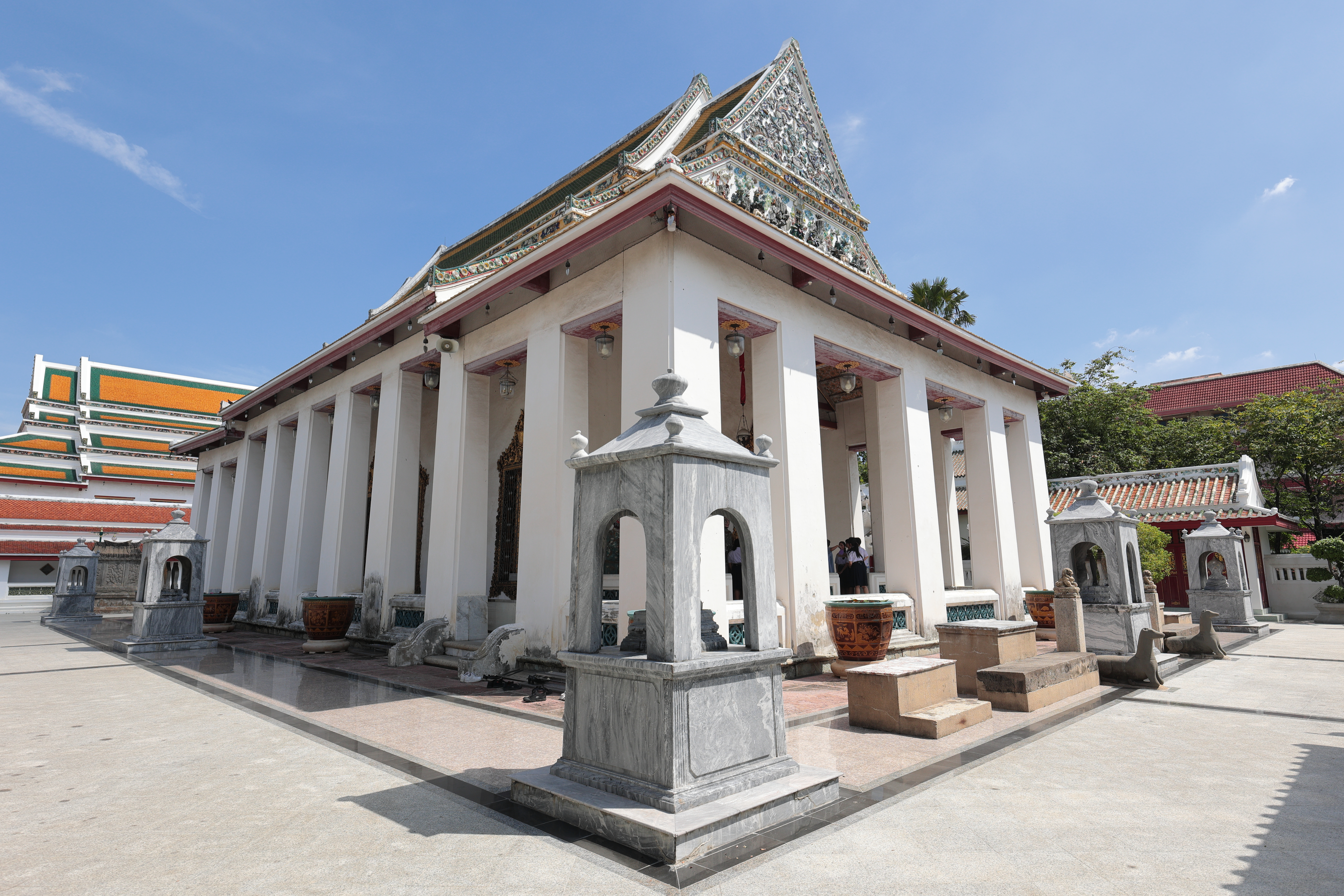
Phra ubosot

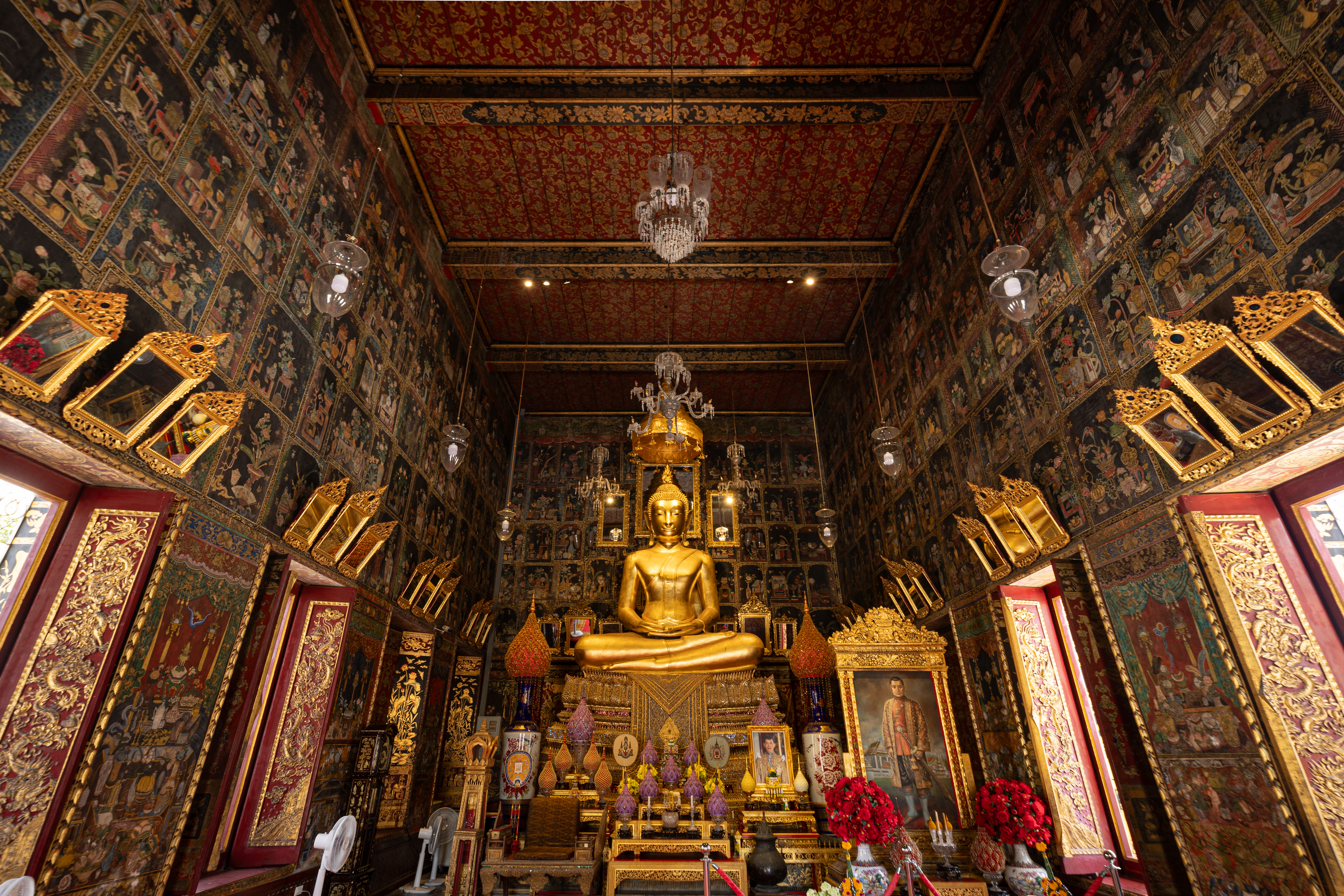
Interior of the Phra ubosot

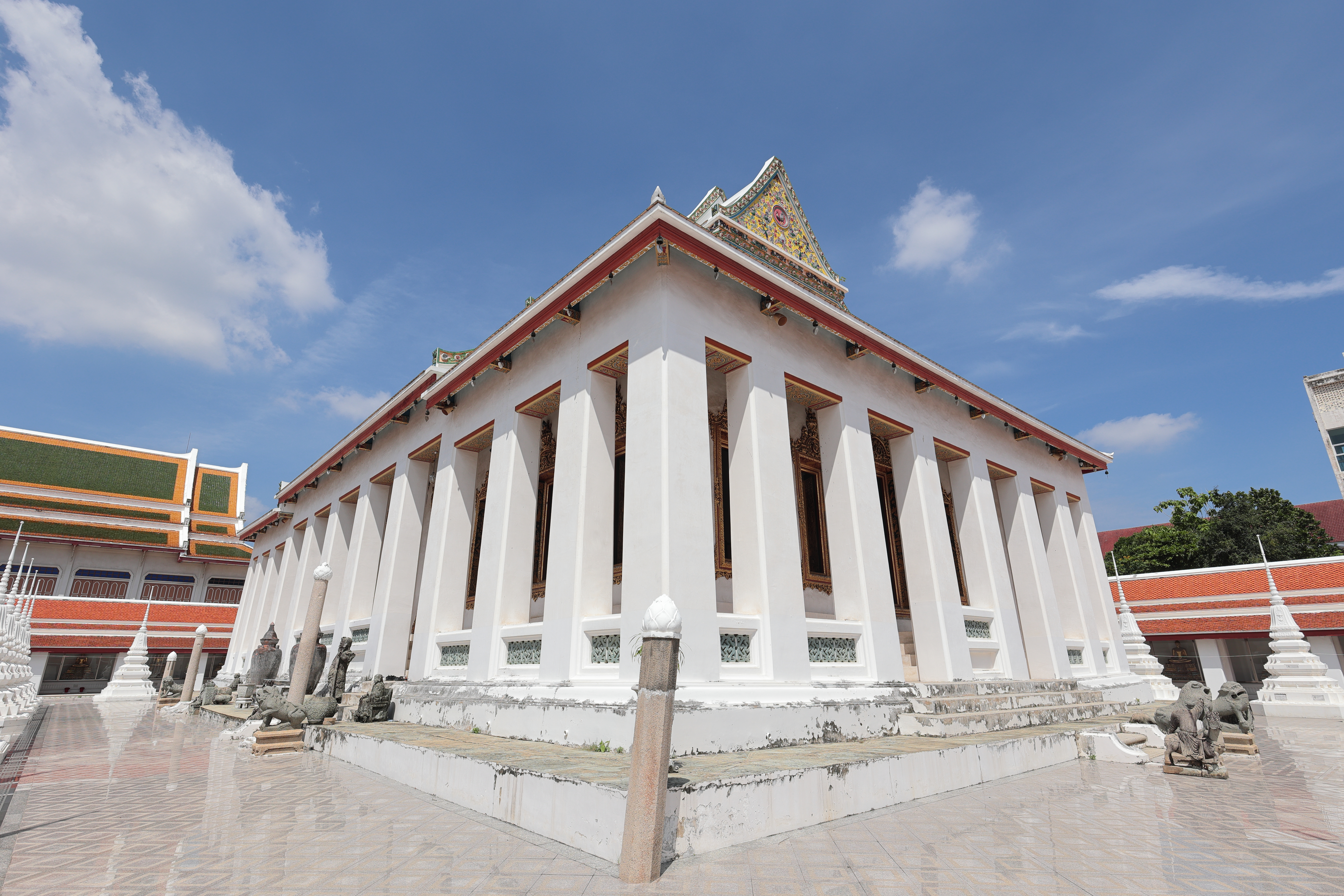
Vihara Reclining Buddha

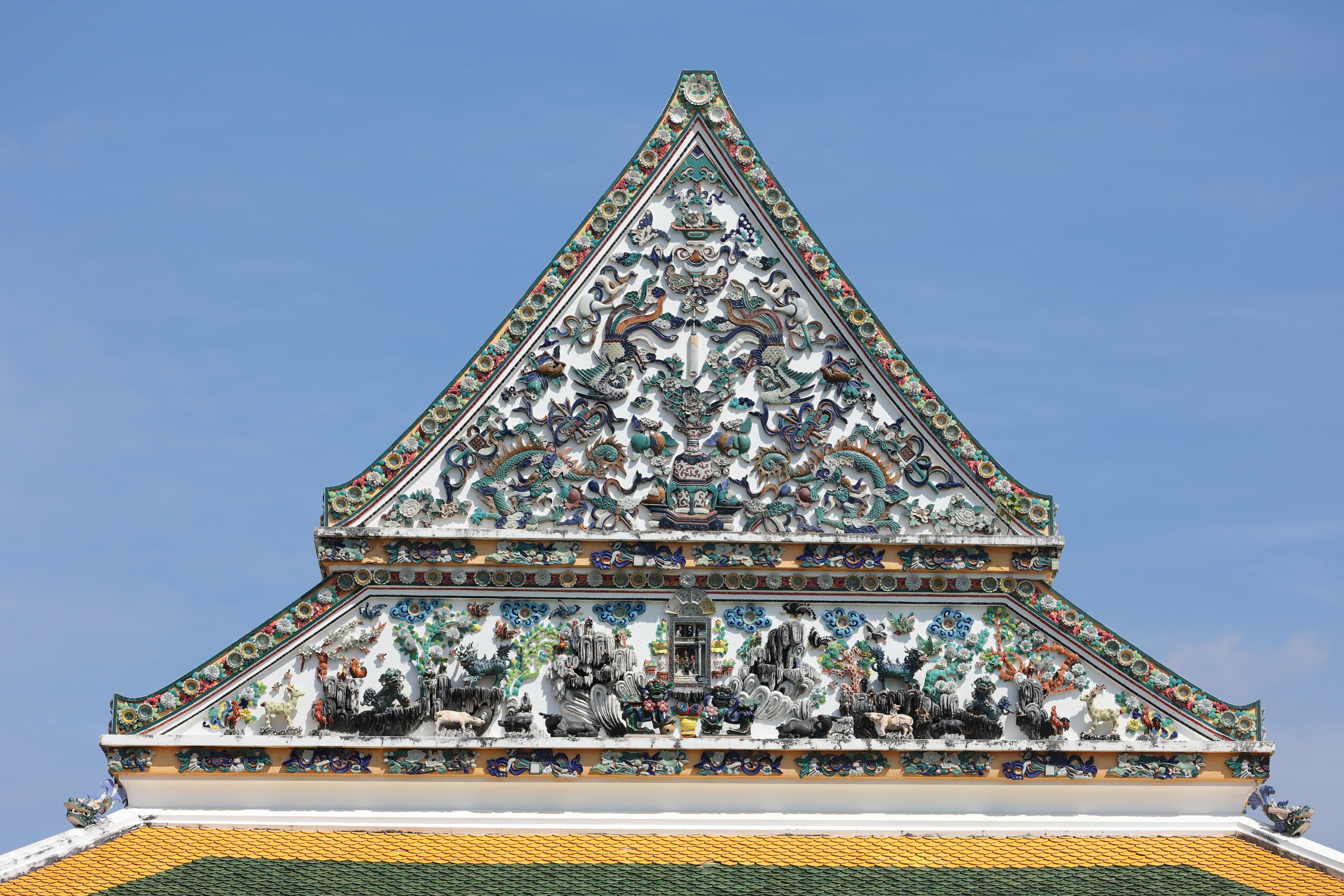
Gable of an ubosot in Chinese architecture

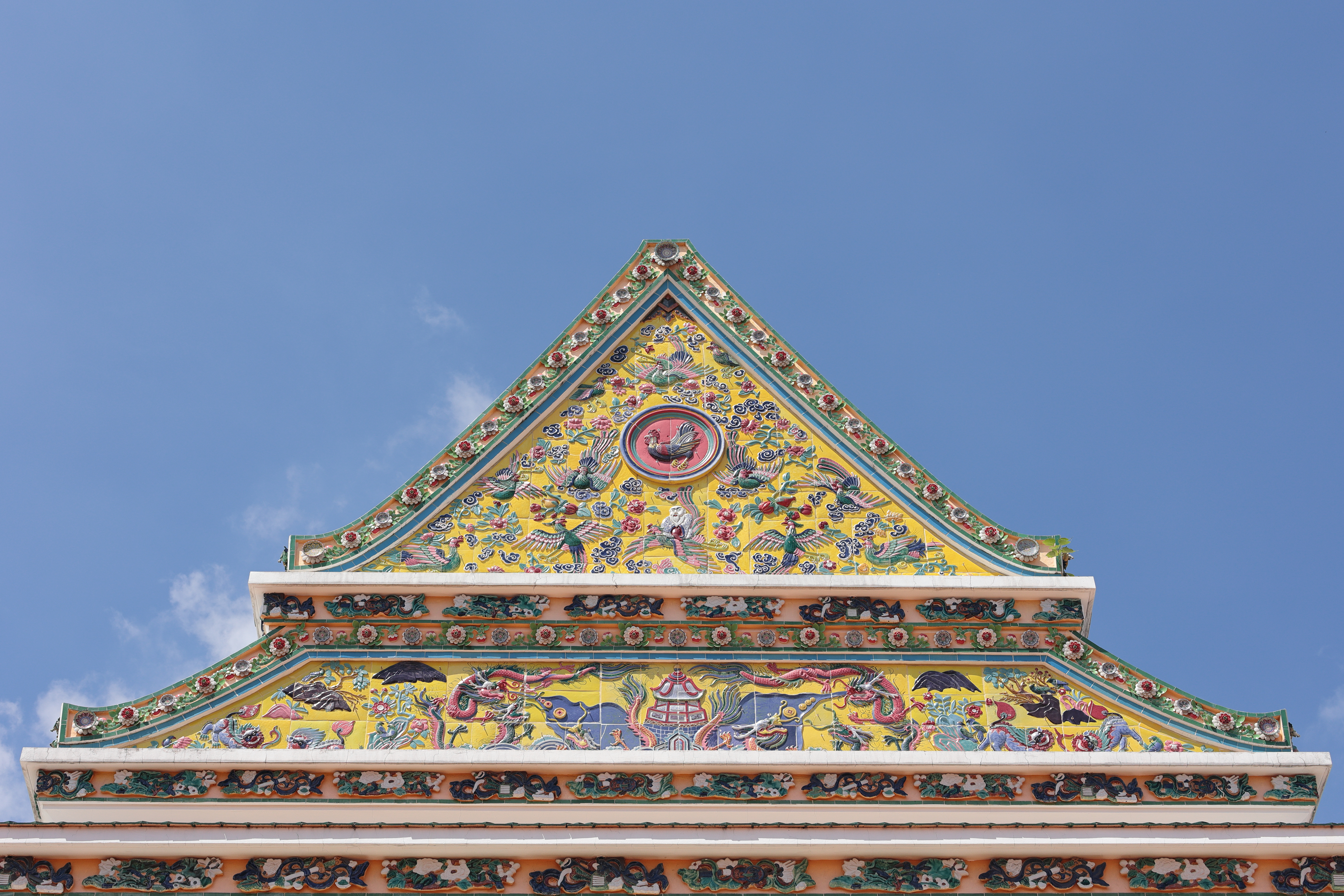
Gable of an vihara in Chinese architecture

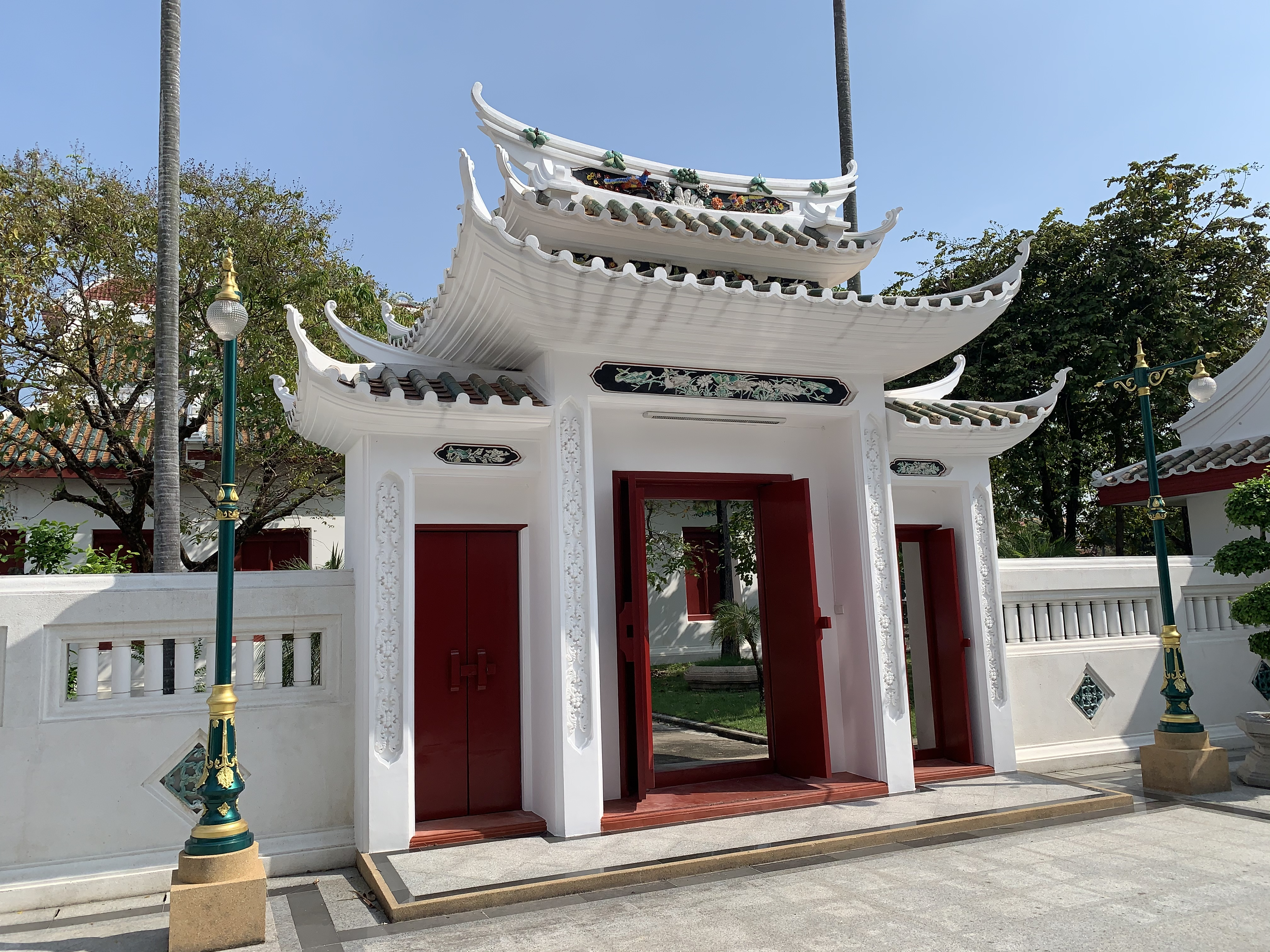
One of the examples of Chinese architecture

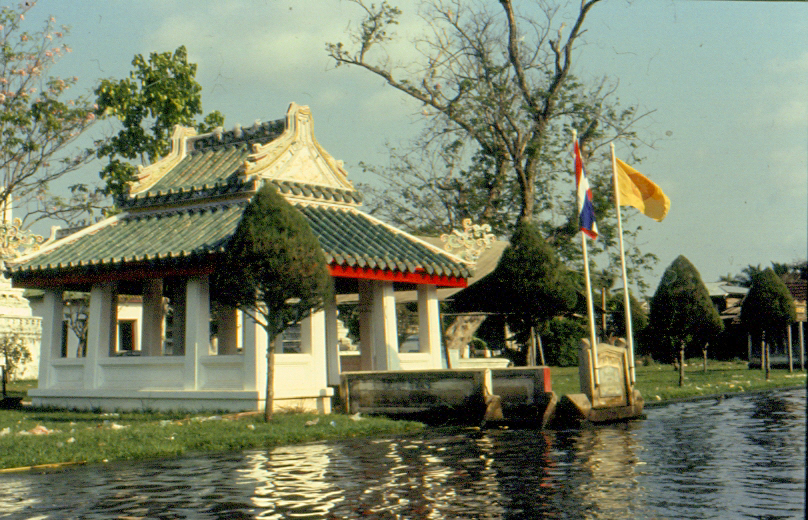
Khlong Dan canal and the temple in 1982
