= Chom Thong district, Bangkok =

Chom Thong จอมทอง
- Khet
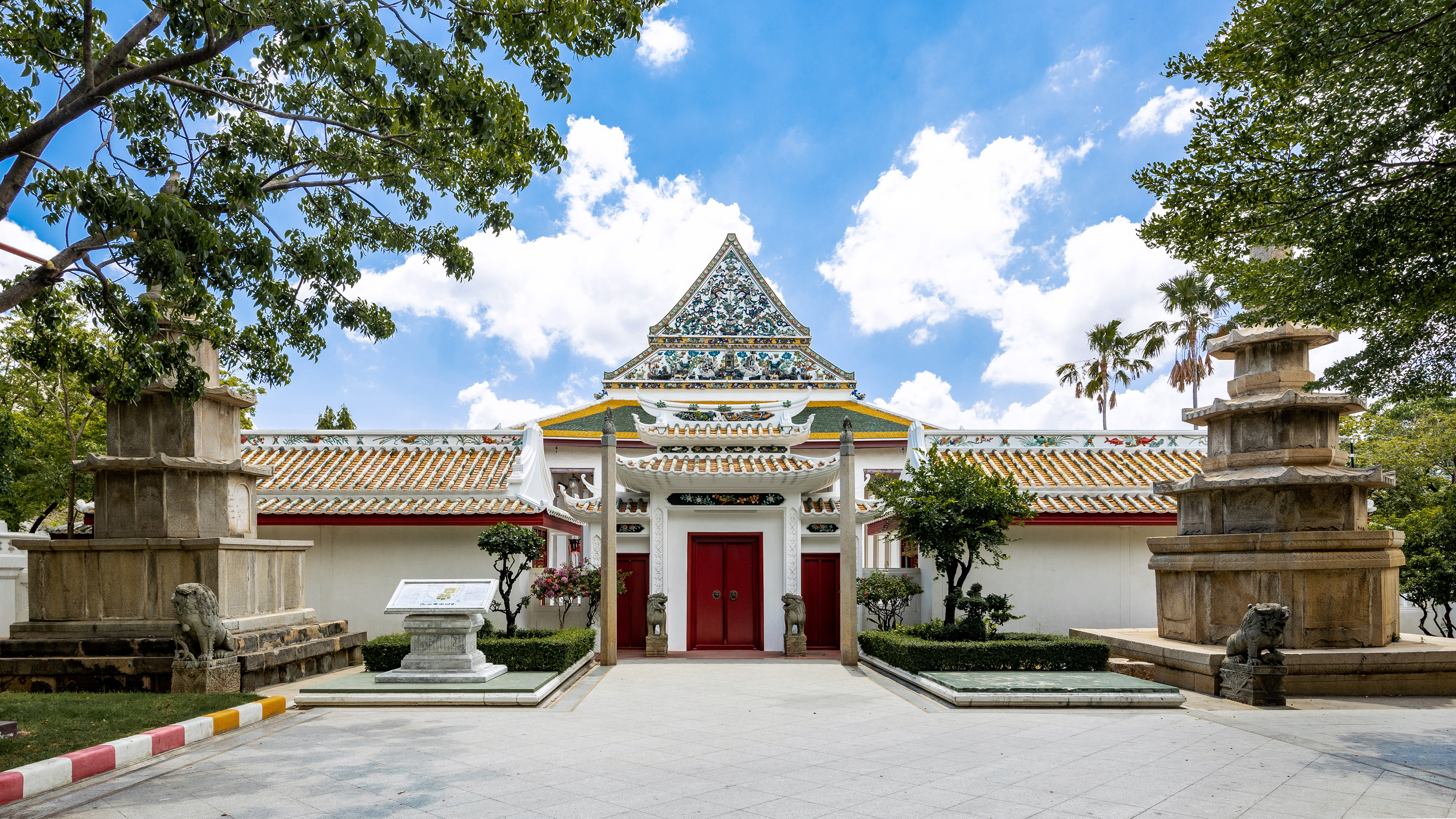
- Wat Ratcha-orasaram

- Khet location in Bangkok
- Coordinates: 13°40′38″N 100°29′5″E
- Country: Thailand
- Province: Bangkok
- Seat: Bang Mot
- Khwaeng: 4
- Khet established: 9 November 1989

Area
  - Total: 26.265 km^{2} (10.141 sq mi)

Population (2017)
  - Total: 152,315
  - Density: 5,799.16/km^{2} (15,019.8/sq mi)
- Time zone: UTC+7 (ICT)
- Postal code: 10150
- Geocode: 1035

Chom Thong (Thai: จอมทอง, pronounced [t͡ɕɔ̄ːm tʰɔ̄ːŋ]) is one of the 50 districts (khet) of Bangkok, Thailand. The district is bounded by the districts (clockwise from north) Phasi Charoen, Thon Buri, Rat Burana, Thung Khru, Bang Khun Thian, and Bang Bon.

== History ==
Chom Thong was included in Bang Khun Thien District until an announcement on November 9, 1989. On 14 October 1997, parts of Bang Pakok sub-district of Rat Burana and parts of Bukkhalo Sub-district of Thon Buri were transferred to Chom Thong during the administrative reform which rearranged the 38 Bangkok districts into 50 districts.

Historically, Chom Thong area is the original residence of King Nangklao (Rama III)'s relatives.

== Economy ==
The district, together with Thung Khru, is well known for its tangerines, the Bang Mot tangerine. There is a giant tangerine sculpture at the junction between Rama II Road and Suk Sawat Road where Rama II Road originate. The district is also the home of the Poomjai Garden lychee farm, Bangkok's last lychee plantation.

== Administration ==
The district is sub-divided into four sub-districts (khwaeng).

| No. | Name | Thai | Area (km^{2}) | Map |
|---|---|---|---|---|
| 1. | Bang Khun Thian | บางขุนเทียน | 5.789 | Map |
| 2. | Bang Kho | บางค้อ | 3.375 | Map |
| 3. | Bang Mot | บางมด | 11.918 | Map |
| 4. | Chom Thong | จอมทอง | 5.183 | Map |
| Total | | | 26.265 | Map |

== Places ==
- Wat Rajorasaram (วัดราชโอรสาราม), originally called Wat Chom Thong, dates back to the Ayutthaya Kingdom. It was named when it became the royal temple of King Nangklao. The temple is unique because of the blending of Chinese architectural style with a Thai Buddhist temple.
- Wat Sai (วัดไทร) is a temple from the Ayutthaya Kingdom. It belongs to the Mahanikaya branch of Buddhism. The nearby Wat Sai floating market was once a busy and lively floating market where farmers came and sold products on boat. The original market disappeared around 1977.
- Wat Nangnong Worawihan (วัดนางนองวรวิหาร), from the Ayutthaya Kingdom, was renovated by King Nangklao. Among the highlights include mother-of-pearl inlaid ubosot panels and the mixed of Thai, Chinese, and European-style in its design.

== Motto ==
The district's motto is "The great sacred monk of Wat Nang, the renown floating market at Wat Sai, the refreshing sweet taste of Bang Mot tangerine, the outstanding beauty of Wat Rajorasaram".

== Transportation ==
- The district is served by Bangkok Skytrain Wutthakat Station at the Chom Thong and Thon Buri District boundary.
