= Na Di, Samut Sakhon =

Na Di นาดี
- Subdistrict Municipality
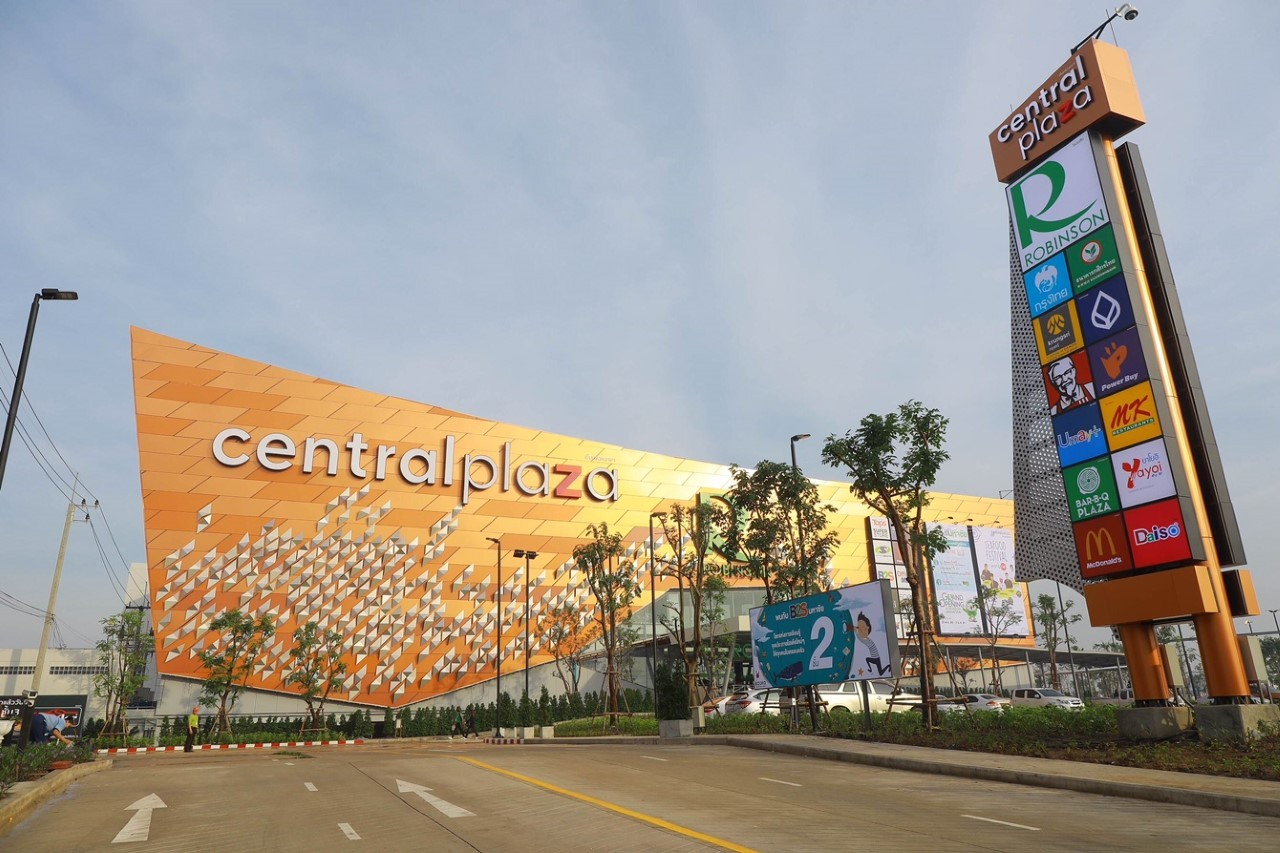
- Central Mahachai

- Seal

- Location in Thailand
- Coordinates: 13.573°N 100.289°E
- Country: Thailand
- Province: Samut Sakhon
- District: Mueang Samut Sakhon

Government
  - Type: Subdistrict municipality

Area
  - Total: 23.8 km^{2} (9.2 sq mi)

Population (2024)
  - Total: 28,338
  - Density: 1,190/km^{2} (3,100/sq mi)
- Time zone: UTC+7 (ICT)
- Postal code: 74000
- Calling code: 034
- ISO 3166 code: TH-740109
- Local Admin. Org.: code
- Na Di mun.: 05740105
- Website: nadee.go.th

Na Di (Thai: นาดี, pronounced [nāː dīː]) is a subdistrict of Mueang Samut Sakhon district, Samut Sakhon province in central Thailand. As of 2024, it had a population of 28,338. Na Di lies south-southwest of Bangkok.

== History ==
Na Di in the past was called "Bang Ping" (บางปิ้ง), but changed the name after the year 1942 when there was a great flood. The local government had dug a khlong (canal) through sub-districts of Bang Ping, Khok Krabue, and Ban Ko, 11 km (6.8 mi) long, and named it "Khlong Si Wa Phasawat" (คลองสี่วาพาสวัสดิ์), along with changed the name from "Bang Ping" to "Na Di" to comply with the conditions of the area where the majority of the population have a career in rice farming. The word "Na Di" literally translated as "good rice field".
First became a subdistrict administrative organization on 2 March 1995, later upgraded to subdistrict municipality on 8 July 2008.

== Geography ==
Na Di has an area of 23.8 square kilometres (9.2 sq mi). The terrain is lowland with the canals running through the area. It is about 5 km (3 mi) from the Mueang Samut Sakhon District Office via Setthakit 1 road.
Neighboring subdistricts are (from the northeast clockwise): Don Kai Di and Khlong Maduea, Krathum Baen district; Khok Krabue, Khok Kham, Tha Sai and Ban Ko of Mueang Samut Sakhon district, Samut Sakhon province.

== Administration ==
=== Provincial government ===
The administration of Na Di subdistrict (tambon) is responsible for an area that covers 23.8 square kilometres (9.2 sq mi) and consists of nine villages (muban), as of December 2024: 28,338 people and 17,422 households.

No.	Villages	Thai	Population
1.	Ban Khok Ta Nuch	บ้านโคกตานุช	822
2.	Ban Bang Ping	บ้านบางปิ้ง	5,099
3.	Ban Hub Sang Kasi	บ้านหุบสังกะสี	4,660
4.	Ban Plai Khlong Khru	บ้านปลายคลองครุ	6,348
5.	Ban Nong Ta Aew	บ้านหนองตาแอ๊ว	2,296
6.	Ban Klong Chek	บ้านคลองเจ๊ก	6,311
7.	Ban Nong Tale	บ้านหนองทะเล	623
8.	Ban Ta Fak	บ้านตาฟัก	647
9.	Ban Rat Samakkhi	บ้านราษฎร์สามัคคี	1,532
		Total	28,338

Map of nine villages of Na Di subdistrict

=== Local government ===
As of December 2024 there is Na Di subdistrict municipality (thesaban tambon), which covers the whole subdistrict.

== Education ==
There are four primary/secondary schools:

- Ban Bang Ping school - Moo1.
- Wat Bang Ping school - Moo2.
- Na Di municipal school - Moo2
- Wat Thepnarat school - Moo4.

== Healthcare ==
There is one health-promoting hospital in Moo2.

== Temples ==
The following active temples, where Theravada Buddhism is practised by local residents:

Temple name	Thai	Location
Wat Bang Ping	วัดบางปิ้ง	Moo2
Wat Thepnarat	วัดเทพนรรัตน์	Moo4

== Transportation ==
Because it is part of Bangkok Metropolitan Region, making Na Di easily accessible by three mainroads: Rama II (highway 35), Setthakit 1 (no.3091) and Ekkachai (no.3242) roads.
The area is served by several bus lines of the Bangkok Mass Transit Authority (BMTA) and affiliated bus companies such as 7 (Samut Sakhon–Hua Lamphong), 68 (Samut Sakhon–Bang Lamphu), 105 (Maha Chai Mueang Mai–Khlong San), as well as many local buses.

== Places ==
- Central Mahachai - a mall and department store (Moo4)
- Porto Chino - a shopping center (Moo4)
- Wat Bang Ping - a royal Buddhist temple with Luang Pho Thongkam, Buddha image. (Moo2)
- Wat Thepnarat - a Buddhist temple.

== Local products ==
- Leather goods and leather bags
- Benjarong - a kind of Thai porcelain.
- Dim sum - a large range of small Chinese dishes.
