= Bang Nam Chuet, Samut Sakhon =

Bang Nam Chuet นางน้ำจืด
- Tambon
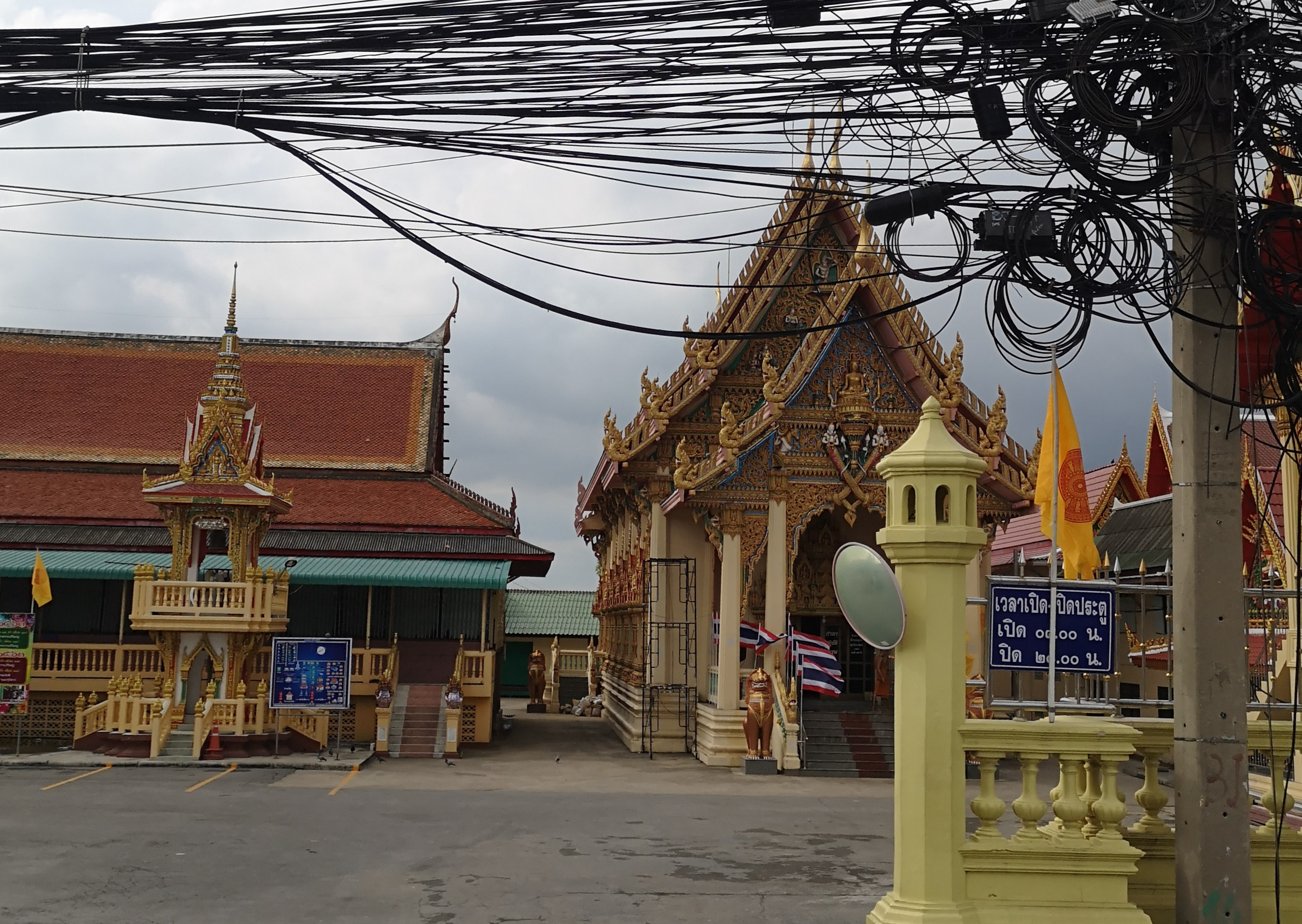
- Wat Pho Chae

- Location in Thailand
- Coordinates: 13°37′25″N 100°21′25″E
- Country: Thailand
- Province: Samut Sakhon
- District: Mueang Samut Sakhon

Government
  - Type: Subdistrict Administrative Organization - SAO

Area
  - Total: 18.7 km^{2} (7.2 sq mi)

Population (2025)
  - Total: 15,694
  - Density: 839/km^{2} (2,170/sq mi)
- Time zone: UTC+7 (ICT)
- Postal code: 74000
- Calling code: 034
- ISO 3166 code: TH-740112
- Local Admin. Org.: code
- Bang Nam Chuet SAO: 06740117
- Website: bangnumjeud.go.th

Bang Nam Chuet (Thai: นาดี, pronounced [nāː dīː]) is a subdistrict of Mueang Samut Sakhon district, Samut Sakhon province in central Thailand. As of 2024, it had a population of 15,694. Bang Nam Chuet lies south-southwest of Bangkok.

== Geography ==
Its name "Bang Nam Chuet" (also spelled Bang Num Jeud) means "place of freshwater", owing the condition of the area.

The general topography of the subdistrict is a river basin. There are many natural khlongs (canal) flowing through every village. The soil condition is depleted soil. Khlong Si Wa Ta Klom, Khlong Bang Nam Chuet, Khlong Thep Kanchana, Khlong Pathumanon, Khlong Khut Mai, Khlong Liap Tang Rotfai, Khlong Khok Krabue are the main water sources.

The area surrounded by other subdistricts are all in Samut Sakhon province, namely (from the north clockwise): Khae Rai in Krathum Baen district, Phanthai Norasing and Khok Krabue in its district, Bang Bon Tai in Bang Bon district and Samae Dam in Bang Khun Thian district of Bangkok are in the south, respectively. Bang Nam Chuet is a northeasternmost part in the province.

== Administration ==
=== Provincial government ===
The administration of Bang Nam Chuet subdistrict (tambon) is responsible for an area that covers 18.7 square kilometres (7.2 sq mi) and consists of six villages (muban), as of December 2024: 15,694 people and 11,652 households.

No.	Villages	Thai	Population
1.	Ban Bang Nam Chuet	บ้านบางน้ำจืด	2,887
2.	Ban Rim Tang Rotfai	บ้านริมทางรถไฟ	2,619
3.	Ban Pho Chae	บ้านโพธิ์แจ้	2,849
4.	Ban Thung Si Thong	บ้านทุ่งสีทอง	2,640
5.	Ban Don Phaya	บ้านดอนพญา	3,410
6.	Ban Nong Hat Yai	บ้านนองหาดใหญ่	1,289
		Total	15,694

=== Local government ===
As of December 2024 there is ฺBang Nam Chuet subdistrict administrative organization - SAO (ongkan borihan suan tambon - o bo toh) which covers the whole subdistrict.

== Education ==
There are the following schools:

- Ban Nam Chuet school - Moo1.
- Wat Pho Chae school - Moo3.
- Technology Base school
- Norwich International School Bangkok

== Healthcare ==
There are two health-promoting hospitals in Moo3 and Moo4.

== Economy ==
Most of the population is employed in the industrial sector.

== Religion ==
Most of the people in the subdistrict are Buddhist. There are two Buddhist temples and there are two Christian churches.

=== Temples ===
The following active temples, where Theravada Buddhism is practised by local residents:

Temple name	Thai	Location
Wat Thep Thongchae	วัดเทพธงชัย	Moo1
Wat Pho Chae	วัดโพธิ์แจ้	Moo3

== Transportation ==
Because it is an area adjacent to Bangkok, therefore, Bang Nam Chuet has convenient transportation. Rama II Road (Highway 35) and Ekkachai road (no 3242) pass through the area. The area served by many bus lines, both from the Bangkok Mass Transit Authority and affiliated bus companies, including 105, 120 (air cond.) 7, 68, 105, 141, as well as many local minibuses.
Bang Nam Chuet is crossed by the Maeklong Line of the State Railway of Thailand (SRT) with two railway halts: Bangnumjued (as spelled according to sign) 19.97 km (12.4 mi) from Wongwian Yai Station (departure of Maeklong Line) and Thung Si Thong 18.76 km (11.7 mi) from Wongwian Yai Station.
