= Ban Ko, Samut Sakhon =

Ban Ko บ้านเกาะ
- Tambon
- Location in Bangkok Metropolitan Region Location in Thailand
- Coordinates: 13.58435°N 100.22294°E
- Country: Thailand
- Region: Central Thailand
- Province: Samut Sakhon
- District: Mueang Samut Sakhon
- Bang Pla subd.mun.: 25 May 1999
- Ban Ko SAO: 1 October 2012

Government
  - Type: Subdistrict Mun./ Subd.Adm.Org.

Area
  - Total: 26.18 km^{2} (10.11 sq mi)
- Elevation: 100 m (330 ft)

Population (2024)
  - Total: 19,715
  - Density: 753/km^{2} (1,950/sq mi)
- Time zone: UTC+7 (ICT)
- Postcode: 74130
- Calling code: 034
- ISO 3166 code: TH-740115
- Local Admin. Org.: code
- Bang Pla subd.mun.: 05740103
- Ban Ko SAO: 06740118
- Website: bangpla-skn.go.th

Ban Ko (Thai: บ้านเกาะ, pronounced [bâːn kɔ̀ʔ]) is a subdistrict (tambon) in the northwest part of Mueang Samut Sakhon district, Samut Sakhon province, Thailand. Local government is split into a subdistrict municipality and a subdistrict administrative organization. It is located 13 km west from Bangkok.

== History ==
Originally, Ban Ko was a village (muban) in Tha Sai subdistrict. In the era of second local headman proposed a separation to set up a new subdistrict. In 1925, the government announced the establishment of the areas of Ban Ko, Bang Pla, and Om Rong Hip together to form a subdistrict for the first time, called "Ko Ari" (เกาะอารีย์, pronounced [kɔ̀ʔ ʔāː.rīː]) in the year 1938. Later, the name was changed to "Ban Ko" according to its topography.
Ban Bang Pla, village 4 status was upgraded from sanitary district to subdistrict municipality on 24 February 1999, effective on 25 May 1999.
The remaining villages (1-3 and 5-8) were upgraded to subdistrict administrative organization - SAO on 1 October 2012.

== Geography ==
Neighbouring subdistricts are (from the north clockwise): Amphaeng, Ban Phaeo district; Tha Sao and Don Kai Di, Krathum Baen district; Na Di, Tha Sai, Bang Krachao and Chai Mongkhon, Mueang Samut Sakhon district, Samut Sakhon province.
The main watercourse of Samut Sakhon province, Tha Chin River flows into the Gulf of Thailand at Bang Ya Phraek subdistrict. Khlong Khru, a local main khlong (canal), used to be an old course of the Tha Chin river. In the King Rama V's reign, the Tha Chin river was excavated. As a result, this phase of the river became shallow and eventually reduced in size to become a canal. With the topography of Mueang Samut Sakhon close to the mouth of the Bangkok Bay (upper Gulf of Thailand). Therefore, Ban Ko has both mangrove forests and nipa palm forests.

== Toponymy ==
The name Ban Ko literally translated as "island hamlet", due to the condition of its area surrounded by waterways. Hence the name. In addition, it is also known as Ko Samut (เกาะสมุทร, pronounced [kɔ̀ʔ sāmùt], lit "ocean island").

== Environment ==
At present, Ban Ko's nipa palm forest is the last remaining. It is like a green space surrounded by highways and houses with factories. The forest is also habitat to Betta mahachaiensis, a bubble-nesting fighting fish endemic to Samut Sakhon and its vicinity (Bang Khun Thian, Samut Prakan, Samut Songkhram). The male fish nests in a shallow puddle beneath the nipa palm tree.

== Administration ==
=== Provincial government ===
The administration of Ban Ko subdistrict (tambon) is responsible for an area that covers 26.18 square kilometres (10.11 sq mi) and consists of eight villages (muban), as of December 2024: 19,715 people and 11,276 households.

| No. | Villages | Thai | Pop. |
|---|---|---|---|
| 1. | Ban Phanthu Wong | บ้านพันธุวงษ์ | 5,560 |
| 2. | Ban Wat Ko | บ้านวัดเกาะ | 709 |
| 3. | Ban Na Wat | บ้านหน้าวัด | 458 |
| 4. | Ban Bang Pla | บ้านบางปลา | 7,650 |
| 5. | Ban Siri Mongkhon | บ้านศิริมงคล | 568 |
| 6. | Ban Khlong Samae | บ้านคลองแสม | 458 |
| 7. | Ban Om Rong Hip | บ้านอ้อมโรงหีบ | 2,270 |
| 8. | Ban Pak Bo Yai | บ้านปากบ่อใหญ่ | 2,045 |
| | | Total | 19,715 |

Map of eight villages of Ban Ko subdistrict

Bang Pla municipality/Ban Ko SAO

=== Local government ===
The local administration is split into:
Bang Pla subdistrict municipality (thesaban tambon) is responsible for village 4 (Ban Bang Pla) with an area of 5.63 square kilometres (2.17 sq mi), as of December 2024: 7,650 people of 4,956 households.
Ban Ko subdistrict administrative organization - SAO (ongkan borihan suan tambon - o bo toh) is responsible for village 1-3 and 5-8 with an area of 20.55 square kilometres (7.93 sq mi), as of December 2024: 12,065 people of 6,320 households.

== Healthcare ==
=== Health promoting hospitals ===
There are two health-promoting hospitals in Moo4 and Moo7.

== Education ==
There are the following primary/secondary schools:

- Wat Phanthu Wong school - Moo1.
- Wat Ko school - Moo2.
- Samut Sakhon Wutthichai school - Moo4.
- Wat Bang Pla school - Moo4.
- Wat Siri Mongkhon school - Moo5.
- Ban Om Rong Hip school - Moo7.

== Economy ==
For Bang Pla village 4, there are some 40 small-scale factories and a variety of business types.
Of the population of the remaining villages, 53% are engaged in temporary employment, 25 % in fish farming, 15 % in fruit farming, 5 % in trading and 2 % are civil servants.

== Religion ==
The following active temples, where Theravada Buddhism is practised by local residents:

| Temple name | Thai | Location |
|---|---|---|
| Wat Phanthu Wong | วัดพันธุวงษ์ | Moo1 |
| Wat Ko | วัดเกาะ | Moo2 |
| Wat Bang Pla | ซัดบางปลา | Moo4 |
| Wat Pa Chai Rangsi | วัดป่าชัยรังสี | Moo4 |
| Wat Siri Mongkhon | วัดศิริมงคล | Moo5 |
| Wat Pa Mahachai | วัดป่ามาหาไชย | Moo7 |

== Transportation ==
Distance to Highway 35 - direction Bangkok is four kilometer. Most people take public buses, the average departure time is about 10-15 minutes per bus. The rest use motorcycles or private cars.
