= Don Kai Di =

Don Kai Di ดอนไก่ดี
- Subdistrict Municipality
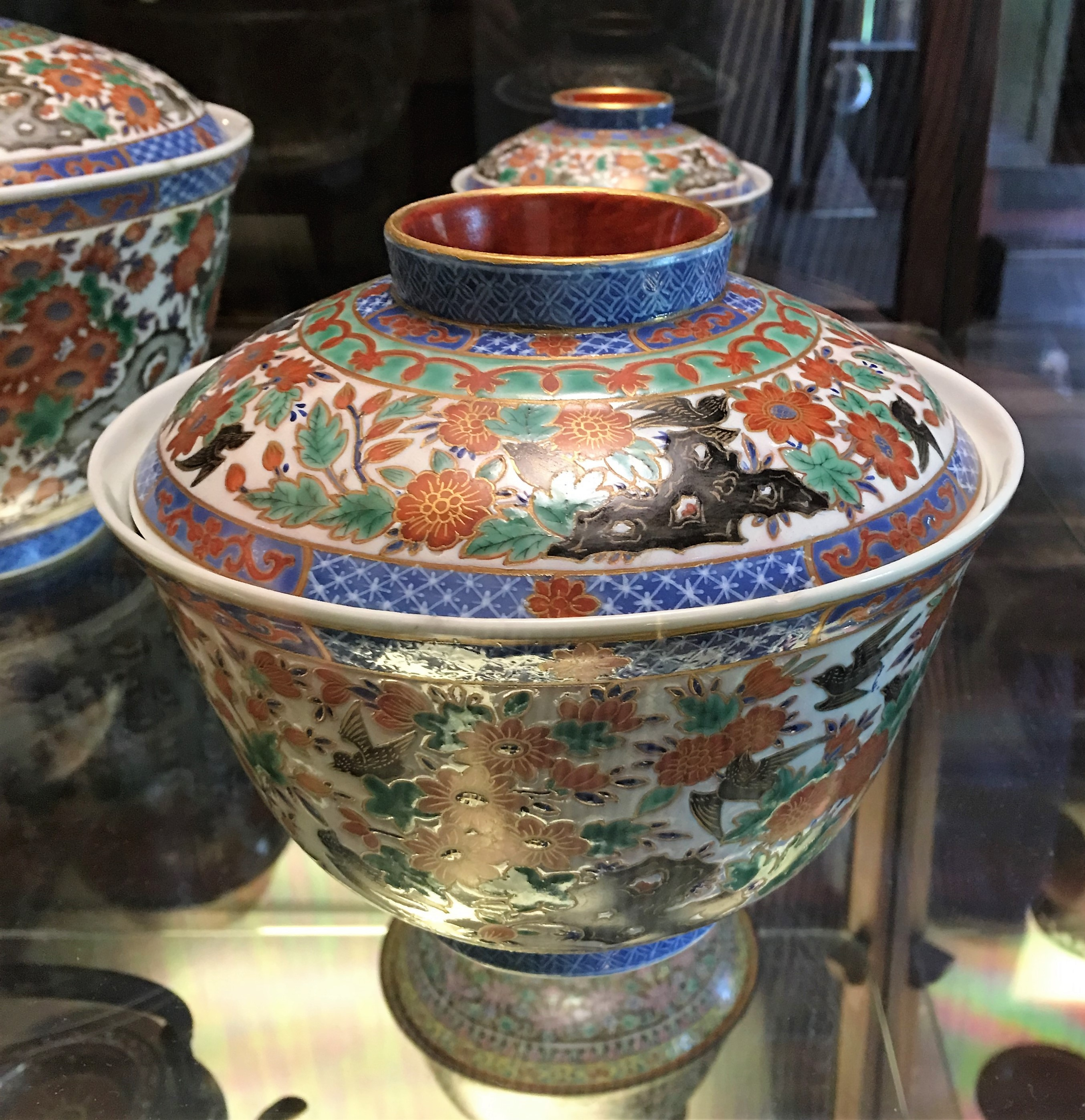
- Benjarong - Porcelain in living colour

- Location in Bangkok Metropolitan Region Location in Thailand
- Coordinates: 13.6370°N 100.26758°E
- Country: Thailand
- Region: Central Thailand
- Province: Samut Sakhon
- District: Krathum Baen
- Don Kai Di SAO: 2 March 1995
- Don Kai Di subd. municipality: 30 September 2011

Government
  - Type: Subdistrict Municipality

Area
  - Total: 8.29 km^{2} (3.20 sq mi)

Population (2024)
  - Total: 8,624
  - Density: 1,040/km^{2} (2,700/sq mi)
- Time zone: UTC+7 (ICT)
- Postcode: 74110
- Calling code: 034
- ISO 3166 code: TH-740208
- Local Admin. Org.: code
- Don Kai Di subd.mun.: 05740204
- Website: donkaidee.go.th

Don Kai Di (Thai: ดอนไก่ดี, pronounced [dɔ̄ːn kàj dīː]) is a subdistrict (tambon) in Krathum Baen district, Samut Sakhon province, Thailand. It is located 13 km west from Bangkok.

== History ==
In the past, in case of flood water came from Bangkok, it would be diverted to the sea via Tha Chin River. They will open watergates all the time so the water of Khlong Phasi Charoen was clear. As time passes, there are a number of plants along the canal. Most of them discharge wastewater here. Water in Kathum Baen and Don Kai Di is polluted.
On 2 March 1995 Don Kai Dee was elevated to Don Kai Dee subdistrict sdministrative organization - SAO (ongkhan borihan suan tambon - oh bo toh). Later upgraded to Don Kai Di subdistrict municipality (thesaban tambon) on 30 September 2011.

== Geography ==
Don Kai Di with an area of 5,179 rai ~ 8.29 square kilometres (3.20 sq mi), most of the area is floodplains near the mouth of Khlong Phasi Charoen, some areas are upland. Most of the area is used for agriculture.
Neighbouring subdistricts are (from the west clockwise): Tha Sao, Krathum Baen and Khlong Maduea, Krathum Baen district; Na Di and Ban Ko, Mueang Samut Sakhon district, Samut Sakhon province.

== Toponymy ==
Its name "Don Kai Di", directly translated as "upland of good roosters", because locals prefer to raise fighting cocks.

== Administration ==
=== Provincial government ===
The administration of Don Kai Di subdistrict (tambon) is responsible for an area that covers 8.29 square kilometres (3.20 sq mi) and consists of six villages (muban), as of December 2024: 8,624 people and 4,779 households.

No.	Villages	Thai	Pop.
1.	Ban Don Kai Di	บ้านดอนไก่ดี	2,158
2.	Ban Nong Ri	บ้านหนองรี	2,201
3.	Ban Ta Sot	บ้านตาสด	1,296
4.	Ban Khlong Tako	บ้านคลองตะโก	775
5.	Ban Don	บ้านดอน	1,055
6.	Ban San Phra Nom	บ้านสันพระนอม	1,139
		Total	8,624

=== Local government ===
As of December 2024 there is Don Kai Di subdistrict municipality (thesaban tambon), which covers the whole subdistrict.

== Healthcare ==
=== Health promoting hospital ===
There is health-promoting hospital in Moo5.

== Education ==
There are the following schools:

- Primary school - Moo5.
- Vocational school (Fisheries college) - Moo1.

== Economy ==
Since Don Kai Di is not far from Bangkok, most people work as employees in factories in the area. These factories produce, among other things, plastic bags/bottles, paper boxes, stickers, auto parts, helmets and glass products.
Some people are agricultural workers; vegetable gardening, such as morning glory, Chinese cabbage, okra, Chinese kale; orchards, young coconuts, mango, orchids, guava and rose apples.
Some have small-scale, semi-home industries, such as making Benjarong ceramics.

== Transportation ==
Distance to Highway 35 - direction Bangkok is four kilometer. Most people take public buses, the average departure time is about 10–15 minutes per bus. The rest use motorcycles or private cars.

== Local products ==
- Benjarong - a kind of Thai porcelain.
