= Krathum Baen =

Krathum Baen กระทุ่มแบน
- Town Municipality
- Location in Bangkok Metropolitan Region Location in Thailand
- Coordinates: 13.65194°N 100.25722°E
- Country: Thailand
- Region: Central Thailand
- Province: Samut Sakhon
- District: Krathum Baen
- Subdistrict mun.: 15 October 1940
- Town municipality: 24 September 1995

Government
  - Type: Town Municipality

Area
  - Total: 2.175 km^{2} (0.840 sq mi)

Population (2024)
  - Total: 23,204
  - Density: 10,668/km^{2} (27,630/sq mi)
- Time zone: UTC+7 (ICT)
- Postcode: 74110
- Calling code: 034
- ISO 3166 code: TH-740201
- Local Admin. Org.: code
- Krathum Baen town mun.: 04740202
- Website: ktb.go.th

Krathum Baen (Thai: กระทุ่มแบน) is a town in the Krathum Baen district of Samut Sakhon province in the Bangkok Metropolitan Region of Central Thailand. In 2024, it had a total population of 23,204 people.

== History ==
On 15 October 1940 Krathum Baen subdistrict municipality (thesaban tambon) was established. Later on 24 September 1995 it was upgraded to town municipality (thesaban mueang).

== Geography ==
Krathum Baen with an area of 2.175 square kilometres (0.840 sq mi), is an urban area.
Neighbouring subdistricts are (from the north clockwise): Bang Yang, Tha Mai, Suan Luang, Khlong Maduea, Don Kai Di and Tha Sao, Krathum Baen district; Suan Som, Ban Phaeo district, Samut Sakhon province.

== Administration ==
=== Provincial government ===
The administration of Krathum Baen subdistrict (tambon) is responsible for an area that covers 2.175 square kilometres (0.840 sq mi), as of December 2024: 23,204 people and 6,688 households.

=== Local government ===
As of December 2024 there is Krathum Baen town municipality (thesaban mueang), which covers the whole subdistrict.
There are nine communities (chumchon) in Krathum Baen town, although not directlty chosen by the local citizens, which provides advice and recommendations to the local administrative organization.

== Healthcare ==
=== Hospital ===
The Ministry of Public Health operates a general hospital, Krathum Baen Hospital with 300 beds.

== Education ==
There are the following primary/secondary schools:

- Ban Khlong Krathum Baen school.
- Krathum Baen school (Wiset Samutkhun school).
- Wat Don Kai Dee municipal school.

== Religion ==
In Krathum Baen town is Wat Don Kai Dee the only temple, where Theravada Buddhism is practised by local residents.
