= Central Mahachai =

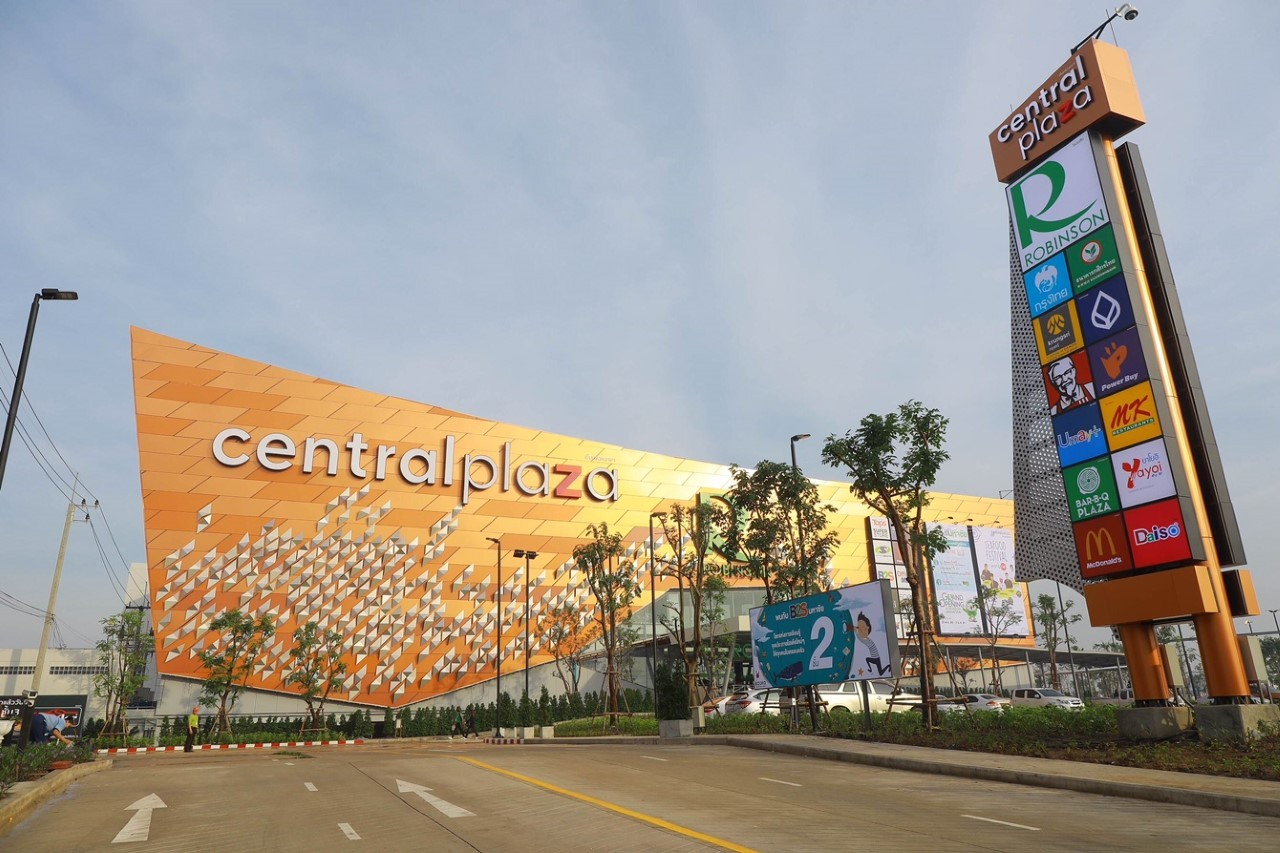
- In front of the mall
- Location: Rama II Road, Mueang Samut Sakhon, Samut Sakhon
- Coordinates: 13.5730°N 100.2890°E
- Opened: November 23, 2017
- Developer: Central Pattana
- Manager: Central Pattana
- Owner: Central Pattana
- Num. of stores: 300+
- Floor area: 170,000 m^{2} (1,800,000 sq ft)
- Website: shoppingcenter.centralpattana.co.th/th/branch/central-mahachai

Central Mahachai (เซ็นทรัล มหาชัย, stylized as CENTRAL MAĦACĦAI, previously known as CentralPlaza Mahachai), is a shopping mall in Mueang Samut Sakhon district, Samut Sakhon province, on the southern outskirts of Bangkok, Thailand. Mahachai is a nickname for Samut Sakhon.

It can be considered as another shopping mall in the Central Pattana network in the vicinity besides Central Rama 2 in Bang Khun Thian area.

Its highlight is its location on the route between Bangkok and the south (Rama II Road), regarded as rest stop on its own and centre of various Thai foods especially seafood.

The mall opened in 2017 with more than 300 stores. It has a gross floor area of 170,000 m^{2} (1,829,864.87 sq ft). The building is designed in the concept of harbour and fisherman settlement, Samut Sakhon's identity.

The total cost of the shopping complex was 4.75 billion baht.

== Anchors ==
- Robinson Department Store
- Tops (28 October 2021 – Present, Renovate from Tops Superstore Market)
- Power Buy
- SuperSports
- B2S
- OfficeMate
- Food Park
- Sam Samut (Outdoor Market)
- Auto 1
- Uniqlo
- SF Cinema 6 Cinemas

=== Previously anchor ===
- Tops Superstore Market (23 November 2017 - 27 October 2021)
- Familymart (Sam Samut Outdoor Market)
- Eatalay
