= Samut Sakhon (disambiguation) =

Samut Sakhon may refer to these in Thailand:

- the town Samut Sakhon
- Samut Sakhon Province
- Mueang Samut Sakhon district
