= Red Boardwalk Bridge =

Boardwalk in Thailand

Coordinates: 13.487566°N 100.363439°E

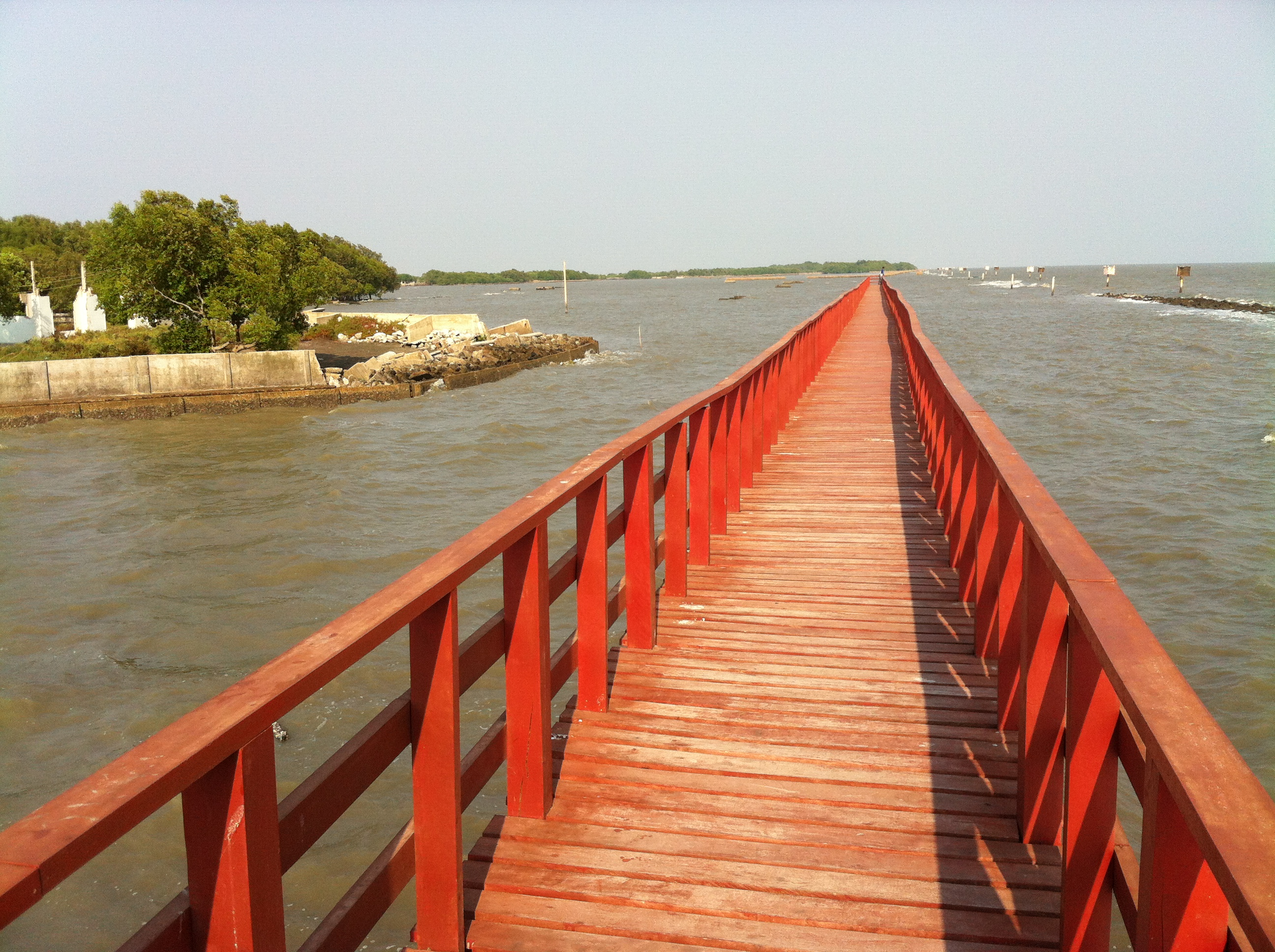
Red Boardwalk Bridge in 2014

Red Boardwalk Bridge (also known locally as "Red Bridge") is a boardwalk along seashore and scenic viewpoint in Samut Sakhon province, central Thailand.

It is a red semi-timbered boardwalk created by Samut Sakhon Office of Public Works and Town & Country Planning around 2014, 700 m (2,296 ft) long running along the Bangkok Bay (upper Gulf of Thailand), the back is surrounded by mangrove forest. It has row of bamboo sticks to delay coastal waves and regenerate the natural resources of the sea. The boardwalk is also known as "Dolphin Viewpoint", because in winter time (November–January) where cool breeze blows into the Gulf of Thailand, it is a good location for dolphin watching.

From here, an unseen Thailand Phra Klang Nam, a lonely Buddhist temple in the middle of the sea can be seen in the distance.

The reason why the boardwalk has to be painted red is because the nearest muban (village) is called "Muban Daeng" (red village).

At the entrance there is a Macchanu Shrine, a highly worshiped shrine for local fishermen and there are also many seafood restaurants serving as well there are also bungalows for those who want to stay overnight.

The boardwalk bridge is located in Tambon Phanthai Norasing, Amphoe Mueang Samut Sakhon, province of Samut Sakhon, about 20 km (12 mi) from the main road (Rama II Road).

It is also close to Bangkok.

In addition, during the early evening, there is a natural phenomenon of bioluminescent plankton in the sea that occurs for approximately 2–3 hours each night.
