= Wat Tha Mai =

Buddhist temple in Samut Sakhon province, Thailand

Coordinates: 13.676438°N 100.253847°E

Wat Tha Mai (Thai: วัดท่าไม้, pronounced [wát tʰâː máːj]) is a Buddhist temple in Krathum Baen, Samut Sakhon, Thailand. It was known for sacred objects such as amulets and talismans. Many Thai celebrities visit this temple as part of their philanthropy and benefit from fortune telling by abbot Pra Ar Jan Uten Sirisaro. These activities have been criticized as commercialization of Buddhism. The temple is also well known in Thailand for placing its decals on rear windows of visitors' cars, producing more than 30,000 stickers each month.

== History ==
In 1977, a monk named Yod Chai wanted to find a peaceful place to practice dharma. Someone recommended a place around "Pak Klong Korg Mhu" (lit. 'mouth of the pigsty canal'). Yod Chai invited the villagers to build the house for monks. Form the event the monks and villagers united. They asked for a permit to build with the name “Sum nak shong pot ti reum rang si”. The temple was established in 1977 on land received from King Rama Bhumibol Adulyadej in 1994. On 28 February 1989 they changed the name to Wat Tha Mai by order of the ministry of education.
