= Nathan Oman (singer) =

Thai singer (born 1957)

Nathan Oman นาธาน โอร์มาน
- Born: Thanyawat Yuntrakul (Thai: ธัญญวัฒน์ หยุ่นตระกูล); May 15, 1975; Nakhon Si Thammarat, Thailand
- Died: July 4, 2020 (aged 45) Samut Sakhon Hospital, Thailand
- Genre: Pop
- Occupation: Singer
- Years active: 2002–2011
- Label: RS Group

Thanyawat Yuntrakul (Thai: ธัญญวัฒน์ หยุ่นตระกูล; 15 May 1975 – July 4, 2020), known professionally as Nathan Oman (Thai: นาธาน โอร์มาน) was a Thai singer for the RS Group.

== Early life ==
Thanyawat Yuntrakul was born on May 15, 1975 at Nakhon Si Thammarat. He is the son of Thanya Yuntrakul, who was born in Ron Phibun district, and his wife, Uthaiwan Yuntrakul, who was born in Surat Thani Province. He studied elementary at Daruensueksa School, and then studied middle school at Thung Song School. He fled to study highschool at Bangkok, which he studied in Poh-Chang Academy of Arts. He got a degree in Liberal Arts, Faculty of Education at Suan Sunandha Rajabhat University.

== Entertainment career ==
Nathan started his entertainment career by modeling for magazines. He then became a recording artist under the RS Group. He released his debut pop-rock album titled Nathan. Later, he became more widely known through newspapers and television shows that invited him for interviews regarding his survival of the 2004 Indian Ocean earthquake and tsunami. Two years later, he released his second album, Sing Thee Riak Wa Hua Jai, which featured a musical style influenced by Nepali Music.He opened a tour company specializing in trips to Nepal and authored two books: Phom Man Dek Lang Khao and Lok Nee Mai Ngao Laew.

== Controversy ==
=== Hollywood and money controversy ===
In 2008, Nathan began giving interviews stating that he had starred in a Hollywood movie called The Prince Of Red Shoe, produced by Big Blue, a subsidiary of 20th Century Studios. He claimed the film was directed by Wolfgang Petersen and Muhammad Suat, and that he co-starred with famous actors Bruce Willis and Christina Ricci, with filming taking place in various locations including Jordan, Iran, Oman, and several other cities across the Middle East. However, when inquiries were made, nothing could be found to confirm that he had starred in the film.

In 2009, Pieak Modelling, who had taken the photos of Nathanfrom the movie The Prince Of Red Shoe, gave an interview on the television program Joh Khao Den. He stated that those photos were not from a film set in Oman, but were actually taken by himself. He explained that he had been tricked into doing the makeup and taking the photos, which were designed by Nathan, and came forward to interview simply to prove his own innocence. Later in 2010, during a taped interview for the show Woody Talks, he admitted that he had made the entire story about starring in a Hollywood movie, as well as his whole background. He claimed that he did it all because his backers in the entertainment industry wanted to create that specific persona for him giving him an amazing life story as a person who could speak multiple languages. In the same year, Jamaree 'Julie' Casher, a DJ for Easy Virgin Radio and a partner in the Jamaree Yak Cafe Gallery, filed a police report against Nathan on charges of defrauding her of restaurant partnership funds. She also spoke out about his action. Following allegations from both cases, Nathan held a press conference claiming he had already paid the money, presenting credit card slips as evidence, and stated that he would defend himself. Chalong Channak, the grandmother of Saowanee Ritthichot, aged 27, also known as Nong Aom, a patient with Ichthyosis, who passed away in March 2009, revealed that Nathan had borrowed a total of over 100,000 baht from both her and Nong Aom. She stated that Nathan claimed the reason for borrowing the money was because he had been defrauded of money by friends who co-organized a donation drive to help Tsunami victims. She also criticized Nathan for failing to attend Nong Aom's funeral, claiming he couldn't make it because he was abroad. Later, Sarawut Martthong came forward to clarify after being implicated, stating that every single baht received from donations to help the Moken people from the Tsunami disaster had already been given entirely to them, including both the money and the boats.

In November, Pritsana Praisaeng, a former singer signed under RS Group came forward to expose that Nathan had defrauded her biological aunt, Nantaphon Praisaeng, out of nearly 300,000 baht. Nathan claimed it was a misunderstanding. Shortly after, Jaruwan Prasang, Pritsana’s mother, revealed several lies Nathan had told, stating that the reason her biological sister believed him was because Nathan claimed that once he received his payout from starring in a Hollywood movie, he would buy her a 10-million-baht house and a Mercedes-Benz.

On March 30, 2010, at the Amnat Charoen Provincial Court, Saman Suksoerm, Nathan's former housekeeper, stated that the mediation for the fraud case in which Nathan had taken her land title deed to mortgage had concluded. Nathan made a payment via a check worth 340,000 baht. For the remaining balance, Nathan negotiated for a reduction. Saman agreed to lower the debt from 740,000 to just 540,000 baht, but Nathan bargained further until Saman agreed to reduce it to 440,000 baht, giving Nathan one year to pay back the final 100,000 baht.

On November 28, 2010, the program Ruang Lao Sao-Atit presented the case of Nathan. During the time, Phisamai Sonkrabut, was helping and taking care of Nathan. He used his close relationship with Sitthiporn Khot-udomporn who is Phisamai's aunt-in-law, to get her to mortgage her land. This was done to get money to buy a Chevrolet Captiva. Nathan claimed he needed to buy it to get used to driving it, as he had been selected as a brand ambassador for the vehicle with a fee of 900,000 baht, promising to repay the money once he received his fee. Additionally, Nathan took 30,000 baht from her, claiming it would be used for clothing expenses as a brand ambassador for another event. He had her sell all the cattle she owned to get the cash, but the organizers later called to cancel the gig due to civil unrest in the country.

== Personal life ==
Nathan got interested in politics and joined Palang Krueakai Phrachachon Party.

Nathan died on July 4, 2020 at 9:35 a.m. ICT, at the age of 45 from Sepsis.
