= Thaitone =

Color scheme

Thaitone is a color scheme designed to follow colors used in traditional Thai art. It was compiled by Pairoj Pittayamatee, and is the result of a ten year study about traditional color making and usage in Thai art history for his master's and doctoral degrees at Silpakorn University. The identity of Thai color is that it's made completely from natural ingredients, such as plants and minerals, that can be found in Thailand. The shades are soft and not too vivid. The problem is that the colors will not be exactly the same every time they are used since they're handmade. To make the Thaitone color scheme universal, Pairoj aimed to research and compare the Thai color scheme with the CMYK color model by using the Pantone color system and collect them in a database for everyone, especially for designers worldwide who can adapt the Thaitone colors to be used in modern design. As of now, there are 156 Thaitone colors identified in the CMYK color standard. Thaitone color has become one of Thailand's cultural identities by reflecting the beauty, belief and characteristics of Thailand.

== Primary colors in Thaitone ==
Similar to the common primary color standard, Thaitone primary colors consist of red, yellow and blue, however, their tones are not the same as standard. The colors are called Chard (red), Rong (yellow) and Kraam (blue).

=== Chard ===
Chard is vermillion. It is considered the most important color in Thai art as red represents heaven and auspicious things in Thai belief.

=== Rong ===
Rong is a gamboge tint. The word rong is from the Rong Thong tree (Garcinia hanburyi hook), found easily along the seaside province of the Gulf of Thailand.

=== Kraam ===
Kraam is the color from the pigment of Indigo stems and leaves. Kraam is usually the most familiar Thaitone color for Thai people since it is very popular in traditional Thai dyeing.

== Benjarong - Five primary colors in Thaitone ==
These colors consist of the three primary Thaitone colors (Chard, Rong, Kraam) along with black and white. The Benjarong color scheme has been popularly used in traditional Thai mural art and porcelain painting.

== Group of ten colors of Thaitone ==
These colors consist of the five primary Benjarong colors (Chard, Rong, Kraam, black and white), and five other colors derives from the mixing of colors in the Benjarong color group, orange, green, violet, brown and gold.

== Ingredients for making color in Thai's color making ==
Ingredients	Color
Adenanthera pavonina	Red
Lac	Red, purple-red
Sappan tree	Red, orange
Red iron oxide	Dark red
Cinnabar	Chard
Red lead	Light red
Saffron	Yellow
Garcinia hanburyi hook	Rong
Turquoise	Aqua
Turmeric	Yellow
Green bronze	Green
Malachite	Vivid green
Indigo	Kraam
Yellow soil	Dark yellow
White lead	Ivory
Lapis lazuli	Gold, white, blue

== Thaitone color nowadays ==
Usage of Thaitone color is supported by Thailand's Ministry of Culture to promote the country's cultural identity. Professor Pairoj still works on the project to identify more CMYK codes. He has also claimed the copyright for the name "THAITONE", but the Thaitone color scheme is allowed to be used freely as reference for colors in any design work, as long as users give credit to the THAITONE Color System.

== Colors ==
Thaitone
Color	Name	CMYK	Code
	Keabbua	c5 m30 y10 k0	T0060
	Dangdokchaba	c5 m90 y80 k0	T1170
	Sangdadduad	c10 m70 y70 k0	T1550
	Khayan	c30 m90 y70 k20	T1600
	Daoroung	c0 m30 y100 k0	T3220
	Srok-jang	c30 m5 y35 k0	T4272
