= Banphaeo General Hospital =

Hospital in Samut Sakhon, Thailand

Banphaeo General Hospital โรงพยาบาลบ้านแพ้ว
- The Ministry of Public Health (Public Organisation)

Geography
- Location: 198 Mu 1, Ban Phaeo Subdistrict, Ban Phaeo district, Samut Sakhon 74120, Thailand

Organisation
- Type: General
- Affiliated university: Faculty of Medicine Siriraj Hospital, Mahidol University

Services
- Beds: 323

History
- Opened: 1965

Links
- Website: www.bphosp.or.th
- Lists: Hospitals in Thailand

Banphaeo General Hospital (Thai: โรงพยาบาลบ้านแพ้ว), is a hospital located in Ban Phaeo district, Samut Sakhon province, Thailand. It is operated as a public organisation under oversight of the Ministry of Public Health (MOPH) and is the only hospital in Thailand be run in this manner. It is also an affiliated teaching hospital of the Faculty of Medicine Siriraj Hospital, Mahidol University.

== History ==
Initially, Banphaeo Hospital opened as a community hospital in 1965 operated by the MOPH with a capacity of 10 beds and was eventually expanded to 30 beds. The idea of creating public organisations to improve the efficiency of the relatively backward governmental department management system emerged after the 1997 Asian financial crisis. After the enactment of the 8th National Social and Economic Development Plan devised by prime minister Chavalit Yongchayudh's cabinet, the MOPH reached out to the Asian Development Bank (ADB) to help revolutionize the operations of hospitals in the country and it was suggested that hospitals should be converted into public organisations to allow greater freedom of management as opposed to the traditional top-down approach.

In 1998, a research project partly funded by the ADB encouraged a shift of hospital operations towards public organisations, coining the term "autonomous hospitals" to avoid being considered as corporations. During this time, the Public Organisations Act of 1999 allowed the establishment of public organisations by the government to fulfill this aim. Seven hospitals were listed by the MOPH to be potential candidates for this shift:

1. Hatyai Hospital
2. Khon Kaen Hospital
3. Saraburi Hospital
4. Yala Hospital
5. Nakornping Hospital
6. Satun Hospital
7. Banphaeo Hospital

Out of the seven hospitals, Banphaeo was considered the most prepared in terms of local community support and willingness to change.

Banphaeo General Hospital became a public organisation on 1 October 2000 and remains the only hospital in Thailand under the MOPH to be operated in this way. It has since expanded to a capacity of 323 beds and also operates a number of smaller clinics in the Bangkok Metropolitan Region.

== See also ==
- Healthcare in Thailand
- Hospitals in Thailand
- List of hospitals in Thailand
