= Samut Sakhon Hospital =

Coordinates: 13.551832°N 100.279069°E

Samut Sakhon Hospital โรงพยาบาลสมุทรสาคร
- The Ministry of Public Health Health District 5

Geography
- Location: 1500 Ekkachai Road, Mahachai Subdistrict, Mueang Samut Sakhon District, Samut Sakhon 74000, Thailand

Organisation
- Type: Regional
- Affiliated university: Faculty of Medicine Siriraj Hospital, Mahidol University

Services
- Beds: 602

History
- Opened: 9 December 1959

Links
- Website: smkh.moph.go.th
- Lists: Hospitals in Thailand

Samut Sakhon Hospital (Thai: โรงพยาบาลสมุทรสาคร) is the main public hospital of Samut Sakhon Province, Thailand and is classified under the Ministry of Public Health as a regional hospital. It is an affiliated teaching hospital of the Faculty of Medicine Siriraj Hospital, Mahidol University.

== History ==
Samut Sakhon Hospital was the last provincial hospital to be constructed in Thailand at the time. Construction began on 14 October 1958, initiated by San Ekmahachai, the governor of Samut Sakhon Province. The building was completed and opened on 9 December 1959. It became a provincial hospital in 2017 and has passed a total of 4 hospital accreditations.

Due to the limited expansion of the hospital, three smaller satellite hospitals were constructed under the hospital's organisation, bringing the hospital's cumulative total of beds served to 676 (excluding ICU beds). This included:

1. Wat Ketmadeesriwararam Hospital (Samut Sakhon 2 Hospital), Bang Thorat Subdistrict
2. Tha Chalom City Hospital (Samut Sakhon 3 Hospital), Tha Chalom Subdistrict
3. Wat Bang Pla Hospital (Samut Sakhon 4 Hospital), Ban Ko Subdistrict

== See also ==
- Healthcare in Thailand
- Hospitals in Thailand
- List of hospitals in Thailand
