= Krathum Baen Hospital =

Krathum Baen Hospital โรงพยาบาลกระทุ่มแบน
- The Ministry of Public Health Health District 5

Geography
- Location: 450/4 Thesaban 4 Road, Talat Krathum Baen Subdistrict, Krathum Baen district, Samut Sakhon 74110, Thailand

Organisation
- Type: General
- Affiliated university: Faculty of Medicine Siriraj Hospital, Mahidol University

Services
- Beds: 300

History
- Founded: 1979

Links
- Website: www.ktbhos.go.th/ktbhos/index.php
- Lists: Hospitals in Thailand

Krathum Baen Hospital (Thai: โรงพยาบาลกระทุ่มแบน), is a hospital located in Krathum Baen district, Samut Sakhon province, Thailand. It is classified under the Ministry of Public Health as a general hospital. It is an affiliated teaching hospital of the Faculty of Medicine Siriraj Hospital, Mahidol University.

== History ==
In 1979, Krathum Baen opened as a community hospital by the Tha Chin River with a capacity of 30 beds. The local community financially supported the construction of the hospital. The hospital was gradually expanded, with a five-storey building opened by Princess Sirindhorn in 2009. It became classified as a general hospital in 2012. Due to the large numbers of industrial estates and factories in the area, occupational medicine is a focus of the hospital. As of March 2024, it has a capacity of 300 beds.

== See also ==
- Healthcare in Thailand
- Hospitals in Thailand
- List of hospitals in Thailand
