= Ban Phaeo district =

Ban Phaeo บ้านแพ้ว
- District
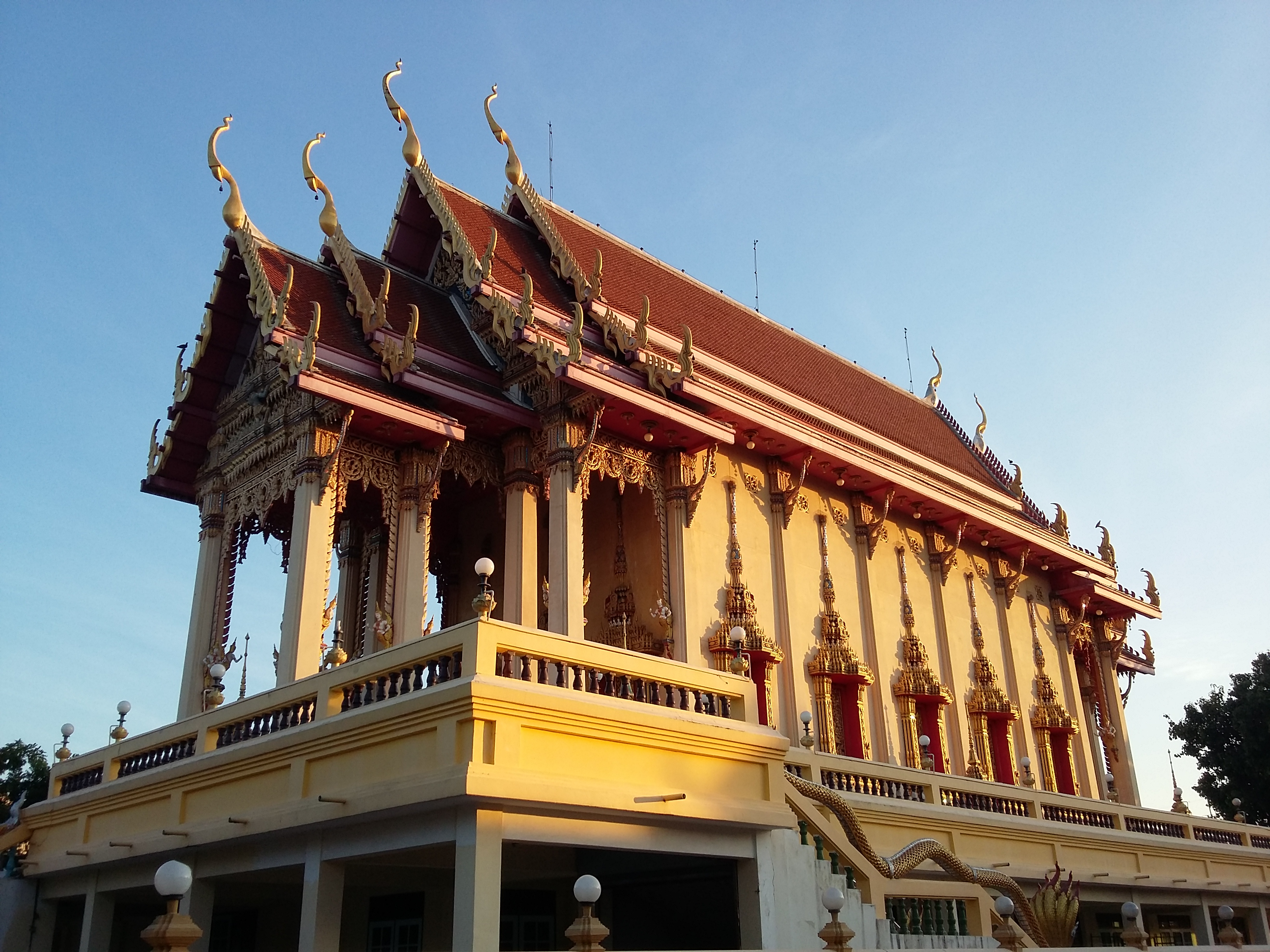
- Wat Khlong Tan rat Bamrung

- District location in Samut Sakhon province
- Coordinates: 13.59082°N 100.10816°E
- Country: Thailand
- Province: Samut Sakhon

Area
  - Total: 245.0 km^{2} (94.6 sq mi)

Population (2024)
  - Total: 101,266
  - Density: 413/km^{2} (1,070/sq mi)
- Time zone: UTC+7 (ICT)
- Postal code: 74120
- Calling code: 034
- ISO 3166 code: TH-7403

Ban Phaeo (Thai: บ้านแพ้ว, pronounced [bâːn pʰɛ́(ː)w]) is a district (amphoe) in the northwestern part of Samut Sakhon province, central Thailand and is located 14 km west of Bangkok.

== History ==
In 1925 the government split subdistrict (tambon) Rong Khe, Lak Sam from Ban Bo District and merged it with subdistrict Ban Phaeo to form the Ban Phaeo district. The new district was assigned to Samut Sakhon province.
On 25 May 1999 the sanitary district of four subdistricts (Yokkrabat, Rong Khe, Nong Song Hong and Nong Bua) was established as Lak Ha subdistrict municipality (thesaban tambon) with an area of 78,481 rai ~ 125.6 square kilometres (48.5 sq mi), the largest municipality in the province.

In early November 2020, an almost perfectly preserved skeleton of a Bryde's whale was discovered in Amphaeng subdistrict in Ban Phaeo district. Carbon dating by a paleobiological lab in the United States dated the skeleton to be about 3,380 years old, when the district was submerged under the sea. The National University of Singapore said that the skeleton added to evidence of significant sea level changes around 6,000 to 3,000 years ago in the Bay of Bangkok.

== Geography ==
Neighboring districts are (from the north clockwise): Sam Phran of Nakhon Pathom province; Krathum Baen and Mueang Samut Sakhon of Samut Sakhon Province; Mueang Samut Songkhram of Samut Songkhram province; Damnoen Saduak and Bang Phae of Ratchaburi province.

The district is located in the plain area along the banks of Damnoen Saduak canal, which connects Tha Chin River and Mae Klong River. Ban Phaeo can be considered as "green zone of Samut Sakhon", because there are no factories in the area.

== Toponymy ==
In the past the district was covered with deep forest. Hunters who traveled to hunt wild animals there always lost their way, so they agreed to make meeting points by using phaeo flags. When people established a new village, they named their village Ban Phaeo.

== Administration ==
=== Provincial government ===
The district is divided into 12 subdistricts (tambons), which are further subdivided into 98 villages (mubans).

No.	Subdistricts	Thai	Villages	Pop.
1.	Ban Phaeo	บ้านแพ้ว	10	10,273
2.	Lak Sam	หลักสาม	13	16,818
3.	Yokkrabat	ยกกระบัตร	12	15,167
4.	Rong Khe	โรงเข้	10	12,147
5.	Nong Song Hong	หนองสองห้อง	10	8,326
6.	Nong Bua	หนองบัว	9	6,656
7.	Lak Song	หลักสอง	7	4,553
8.	Chet Riw	เจ็ดริ้ว	5	4,027
9.	Khlong Tan	คลองตัน	5	5,502
10.	Amphaeng	อำแพง	7	7,334
11.	Suan Som	สวนส้ม	5	5,242
12.	Kaset Phatthana	เกษดรพัฒนา	5	5,108
		Total	98	101,266

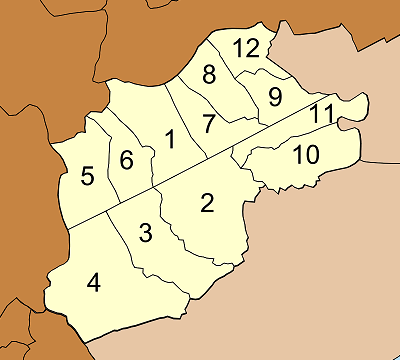
Map of subdistricts

=== Local government ===
As of December 2024 there are: three subdistrict municipalities (thesaban tambon). Lak Ha subdistrict municipality cover the four subdistricts: Yokkrabat, Rong Khe, Nong Song Hong and Nong Bua. Kaset Phatthana covers the whole subdistrict of the same name and part of Khlong Tan. Ban Phaeo subdistrict municipality covers parts of Lak Sam and Ban Phaeo subdistricts. The non-municipal areas are administered by seven subdistrict administrative organizations - SAO (ongkan borihan suan tambon - o bo toh).

Lak Ha subdistrict municipality	Pop.	05740303	lakha-munic.go.th
Subdistrict Yokkrabat	15,167		
Subdistrict Rong Khe	12,147		
Subdistrict Nong Song Hong	8,326		
Subdistrict Nong Bua	6,656		
Total population	42,296		

Kaset Phatthana subdistrict municipality	Pop.	05740301	kaset-pt.go.th
Subd. Kaset Phatthana	5,108		
Subdistrict Khlong Tan	113		
Total population	5,221		

Ban Phaeo subdistrict municipality	Pop.	05740302	banphaeocity.go.th
Subdistrict Lak Sam	1,502		
Subdistrict Ban Phaeo	1,270		
Total population	2,772		

Subdistrict adm.org-SAO	Pop.	LAO code	website
Lak Sam SAO	15,316	06740308	
Ban Phaeo SAO	9,003	06740304	
Amphaeng SAO	7,334	06740309	ampang.go.th
Khlong Tan SAO	5,502	06740305	klongton.go.th
Suan Som SAO	5,242	06740306	suansom.go.th
Lak Song SAO	4,553	06740307	laksong.go.th
Chet Riw SAO	4,027	06740310	jedriew.go.th

== Economy ==
Ban Phaeo is a district that is well known as the area where young aromatic coconut trees are grown widely. In addition, Ban Phaeo is also the largest breeding place for snakeskin gourami fish in the country.

== Healthcare ==
=== Hospital ===
Ban Phaeo district is served by Ban Phaeo General Hospital, the only hospital public organisation in Thailand with 323 beds.

=== Health promoting hospitals ===
There are total nineteen health-promoting hospitals in the district, of which; one in Chet Riw, Khlong Tan and Suan Som, but Lak Sam, Yokkrabat, Rong Khe, Nong Song Hong, Nong Bua, Lak Song, Amphaeng and Kaset Phatthana each have two.

== Religion ==
There are thirteen-one Theravada Buddhist temples in the district.
One in Khlong Tan and Kaset Phatthana, two in Ban Phaeo, Yokkrabat, Nong Song Hong, Lak Song and Chet Riw, three in Amphaeng and Suan Som, four in Lak Sam and Nong Bua, five in Rong Khe.
