= Benjarong =

Painted Thai ceramics

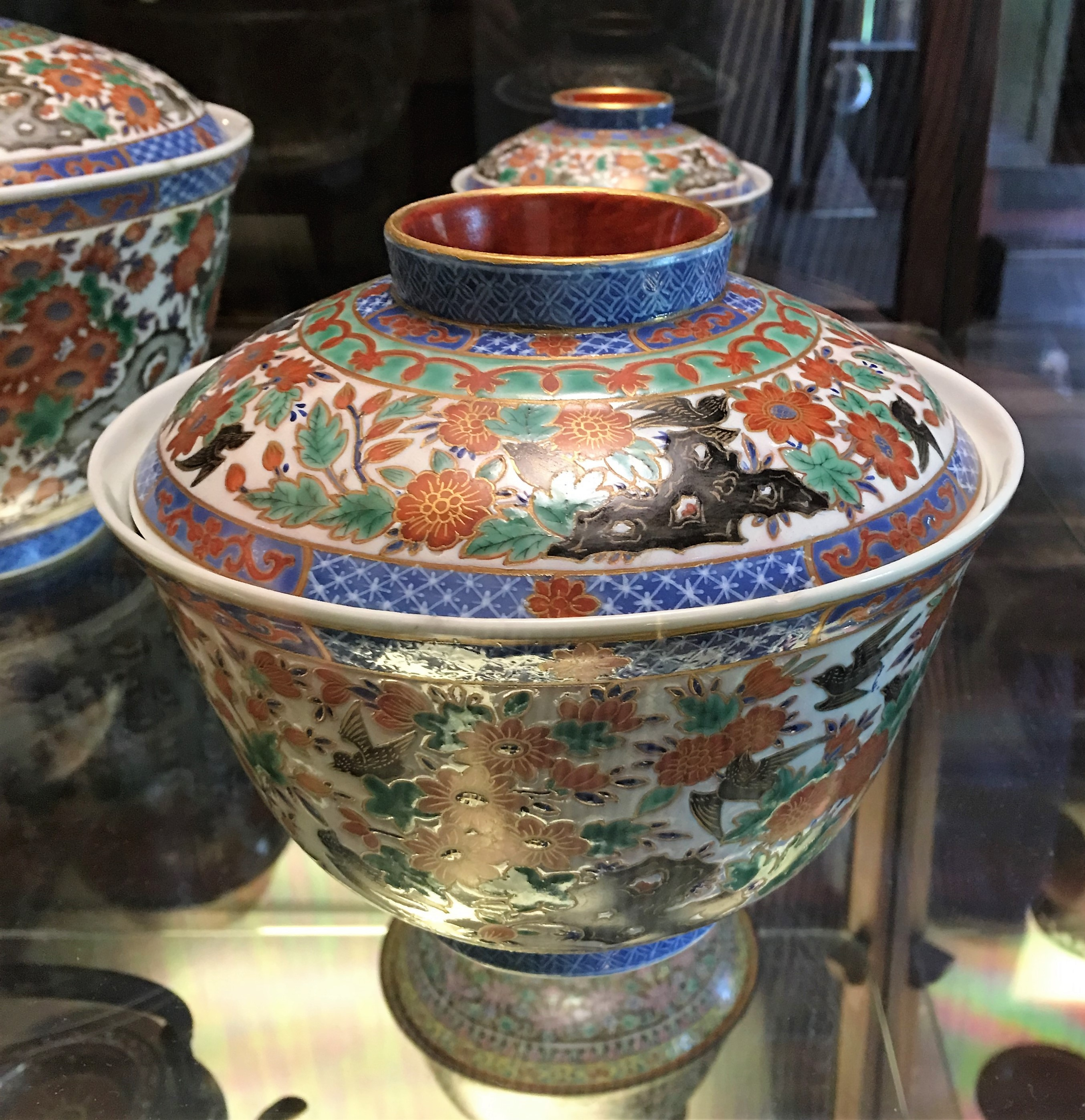
Benjarong, 19th century

Benjarong (Thai เบญจรงค์) porcelain ware is a kind of painted Thai ceramics. While the name literally means "five colours (Wucai)," it is a figurative description and actual decoration can have anywhere between three and eight colours. For the decoration, repetitive forms, usually geometric or flower-based, are used. A design is usually named after the decoration base name and a background color (for example, Phum Kao Bin on dark blue).

Enamel colors are applied and overglazed, creating a swelling effect over the surface of the piece. The production process is extremely labor-intensive, as each color is applied individually and the piece is kiln fired after the application of each color. The firing process brightens the colors of the finished piece and adds to its beauty. Gold is also used in painting the porcelain.

== History ==
The earliest trace of Benjarong ever recorded is back to the Ming dynasty in China (1368–1644 A.D.). In the reign of Xuande Emperor (1425-1435 A.D.) Benjarong was invented at Zhejiang province but it only gained popularity during the reign of Chenghua Emperor (1464-1487 A.D.). In China, Benjarong will have three or more colors but in Thailand, Benjarong usually has five or more colors. (Wikipedia Ming Dynasty, 2014) (List of Emperors of the Ming Dynasty, 2014) About 600 years ago, a princess from China was married into the Siam dynasty (now Thailand) and she brought Benjarong with her. At that time, it is understood that Benjarong porcelain was made only for the Emperor of China's use. However, Benjarong was then supplied from China to the king of Siam for several generations (i.e. King Prasat Thong reigned 1629-1656). Siam started to produce porcelain after they discovered Kaolin which is one of the main materials of Benjarong. (History of Benjarong, 2014) After discovering the Kaolin, the King of Siam decided to bring some of the artists from China and established workshops in Siam Kingdom. The first Benjarong that was made in Thailand was in the reign of King Rama V. King Rama V also permitted Benjarong to be used by his aristocracy and by certain wealthy and influential merchants. Nowadays, Benjarong is available to all who have the means to purchase it because of King Rama IX's permission.

== Production ==
Production of Benjarong is a process known to only small communities of Thai artists which have passed down the knowledge from generation to generation. The artisan who makes Benjarong has to be very skillful and careful. The production process also requires skilled laborers. Form and pattern details make all Benjarong masterpieces. In the porcelain selection, only white porcelain (Bone China and Royal Porcelain) which has been fired at the proper temperature (1150-1280 degree Celsius) for many hours, are selected. White ware must not have any flaws. After selecting the perfect porcelain, it is then cleaned. During this process, it is necessary to avoid oily surfaces from sweaty and dirty hands. The piece is then painted, beginning with hypodermic syringe or paint brush to draw lines. The process begins with drawing circular guide lines on the piece while rotating it on a turning wheel, which is manually controlled. While drawing on the design, the artist will keep the sample pattern in front of him so they can draw the pattern correctly. The initial pattern drawing is very crucial to how the design will turn out, so it must be done by a well-experienced artist (usually drawn by a master craftsman). This is the reason why the pattern is drawn in very fine lines on each Benjarong. In the painting process, there are various colors of paint but basically we use five main colors (black, green, yellow, red and white). The specialized paint for Benjarong needs a skillful painter. The paint is made from mineral colors and must be well crushed and mixed with water in the proper ratio. The crushing equipment is ceramic (or equivalent material) mortar. The paint should not be too thick or thin. If the paint is too thick, it will not be completely fired and the color will not be shown as expected. If the paint is too thin, the color will fade. Also, the paint must not overlap with any line of another color. At the final stage of painting, 18 karat gold might be added to the rims in order to make it look glamorous. The next step after painting is firing. Painted wares will be put in the kiln. The spaces between them are 0.5 – 1.0 cm; otherwise, the painted wares might touch each other and might damage the pattern that was painted after firing. The temperature in the kiln is controlled between 800 and 1000◦C and takes about 10 hours firing time. The Benjarong must be put in the kiln five times. After finishing the firing, the Benjarong will be cooled down; then it is taken out of the kiln. Once the Benjarong has been fired, it can be seen as three-dimensional bubbles of paint on the surface, which is the reason why Benjarong is unique. At the end of production, there will be quality control. The slightest mistake in any process would ruin the design and fame of Benjarong. Any mistake is unacceptable. Benjarong is supposed to be perfect in every respect. If a mistake is found, it will be sent back to the studio or might be thrown it away. In fact, this happens very rarely because during each stage the artists take good care of each individual piece. (Blobiztar Company Limited)

== Usage ==
Most people use it as a precious gift to special occasions such as wedding or New Year's Day. Also some people use it as the decorate items for houses. Benjarong is the product that anyone would be pleased to receive. However, Benjarong is fragile which is similar to ceramic. It would break if dropped on the floor, so you should take good care of it and make sure to keep it out from children and pets. Even though the colors on Benjarong have good quality and will not fade, it is smarter to avoid direct exposure to sunlight for a long period. Also, you are not allowed to clean the Benjarong with cleaners or scouring agents. The abrasive materials and hard surface is not suggested in cleaning Benjarong. The Banjarong should be cleaned with a soft sponge, soft dry cloth or simply by hand.
