= Samut Sakhon province =

Province of Thailand

Coordinates: 13°32′50″N 100°16′25″E

Samut Sakhon สมุทรสาคร
- Province

Other transcription(s)
  - Teochew: 龍仔厝 lê̬ng giăn cu (Peng'im)
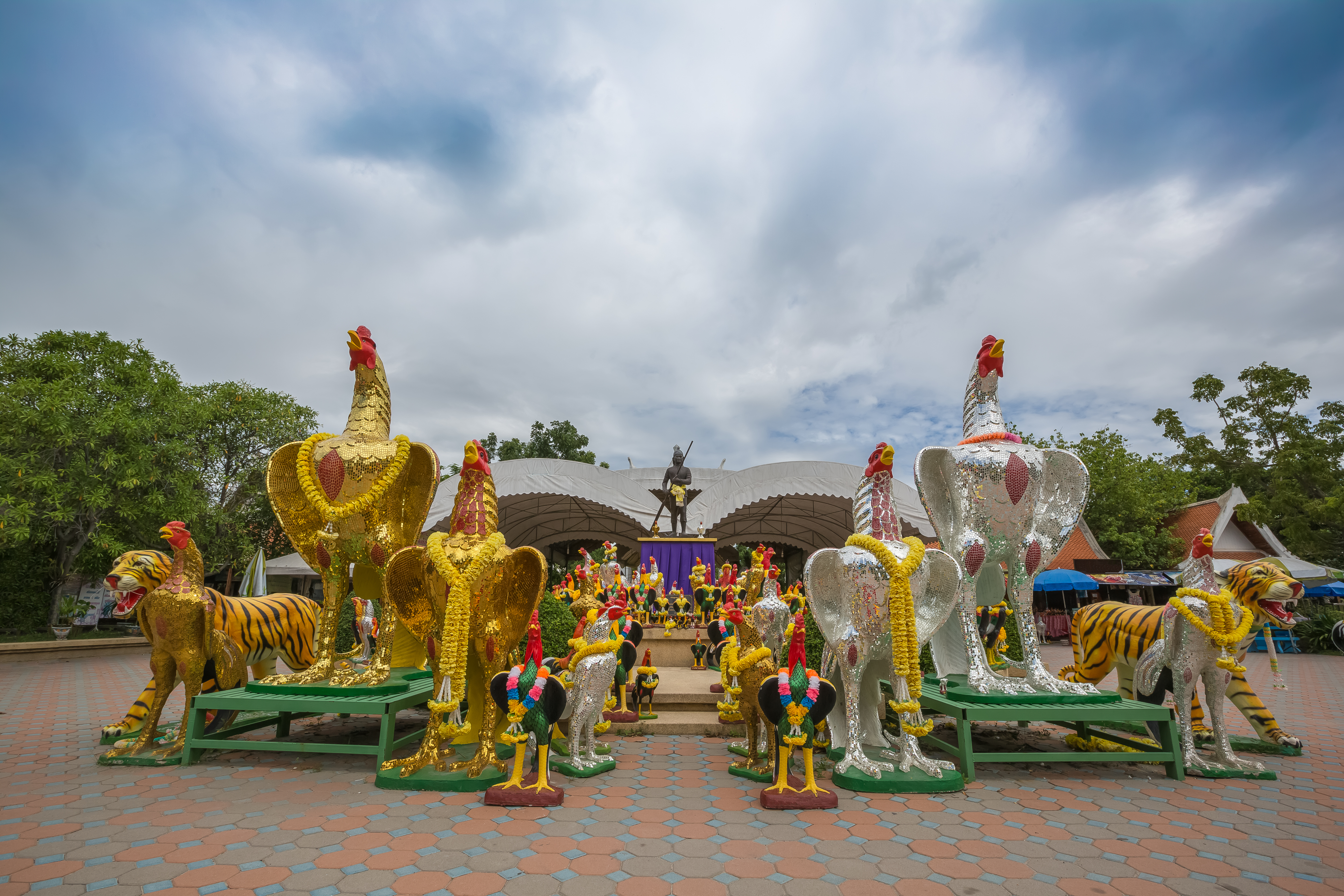
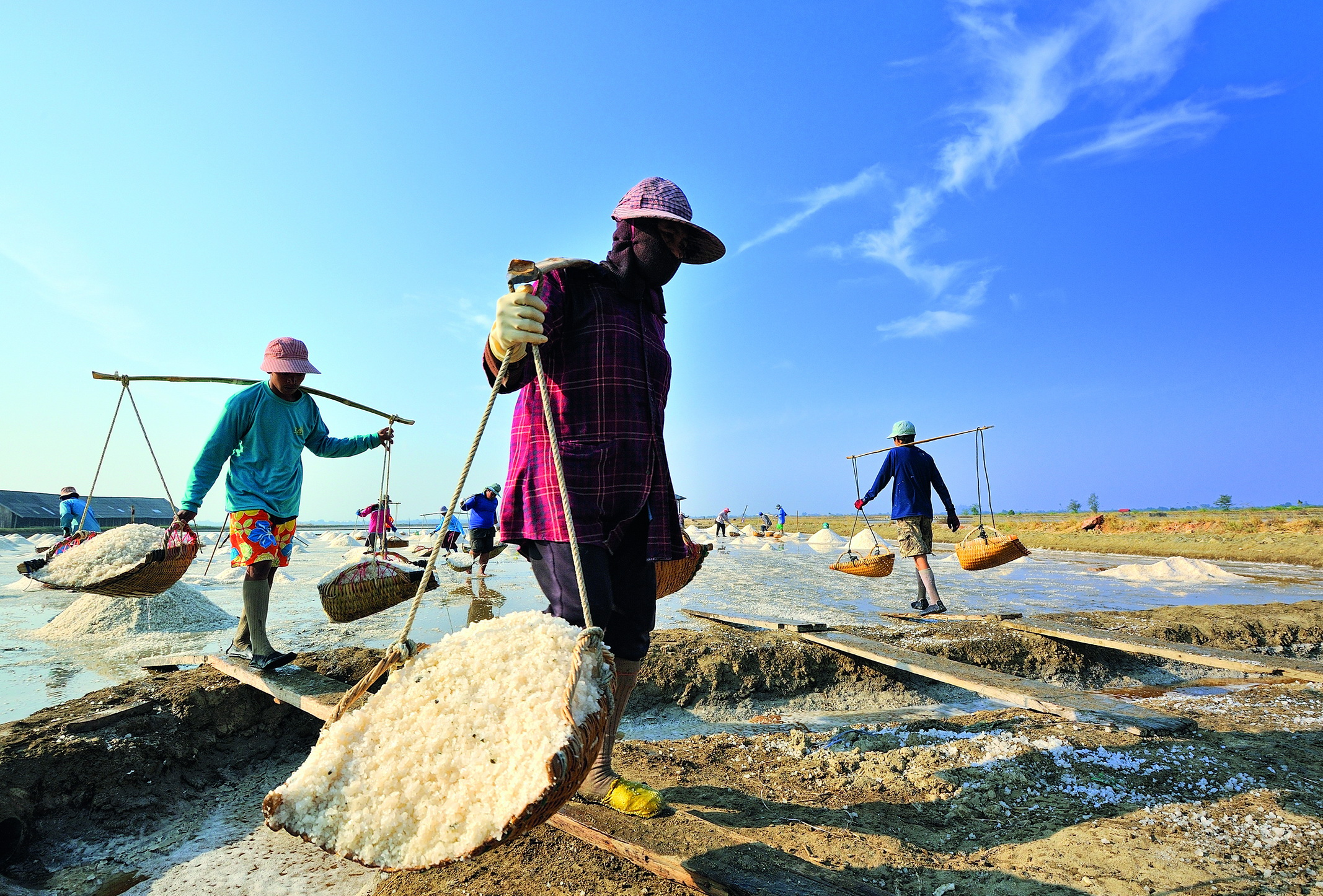
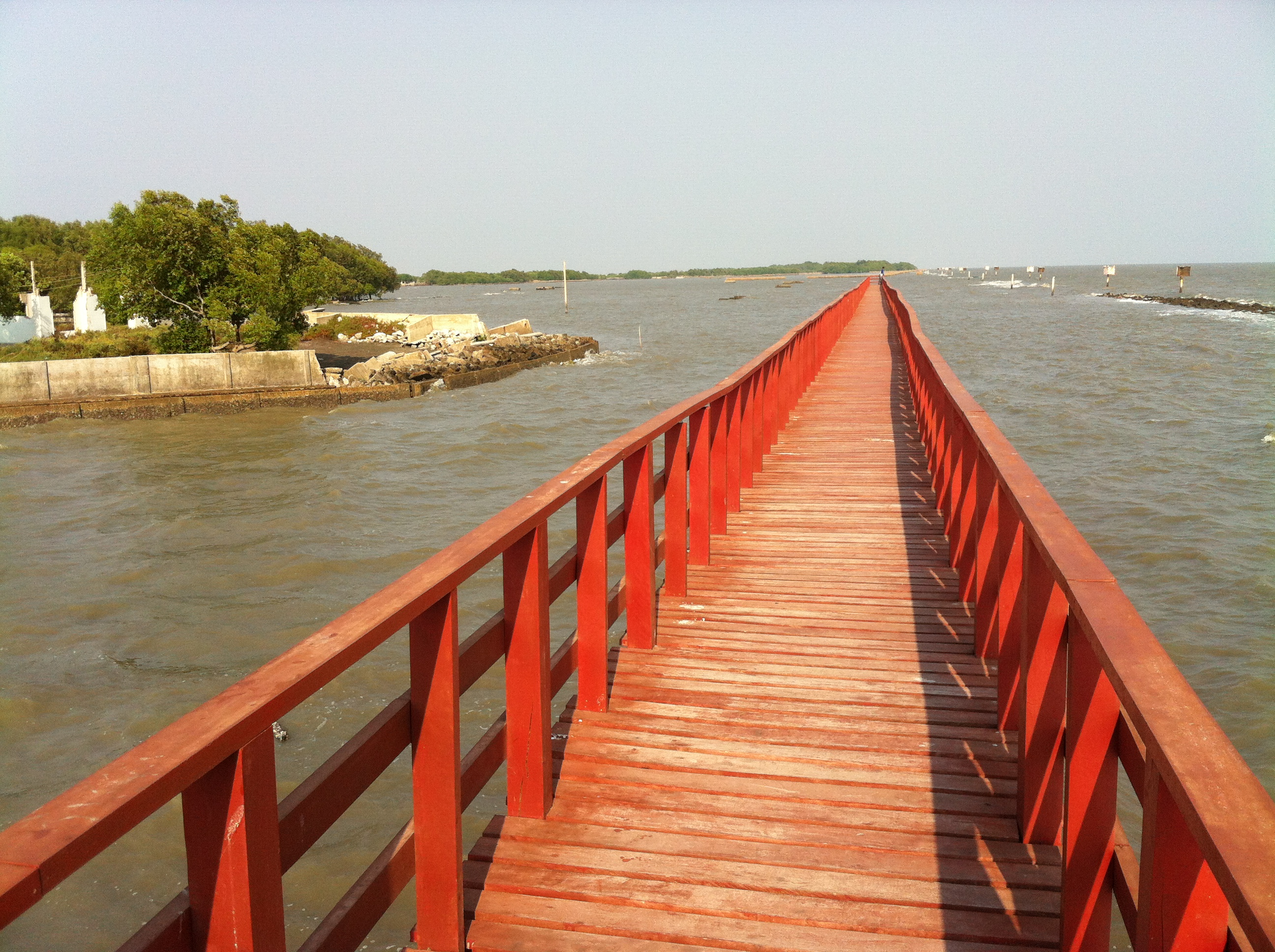
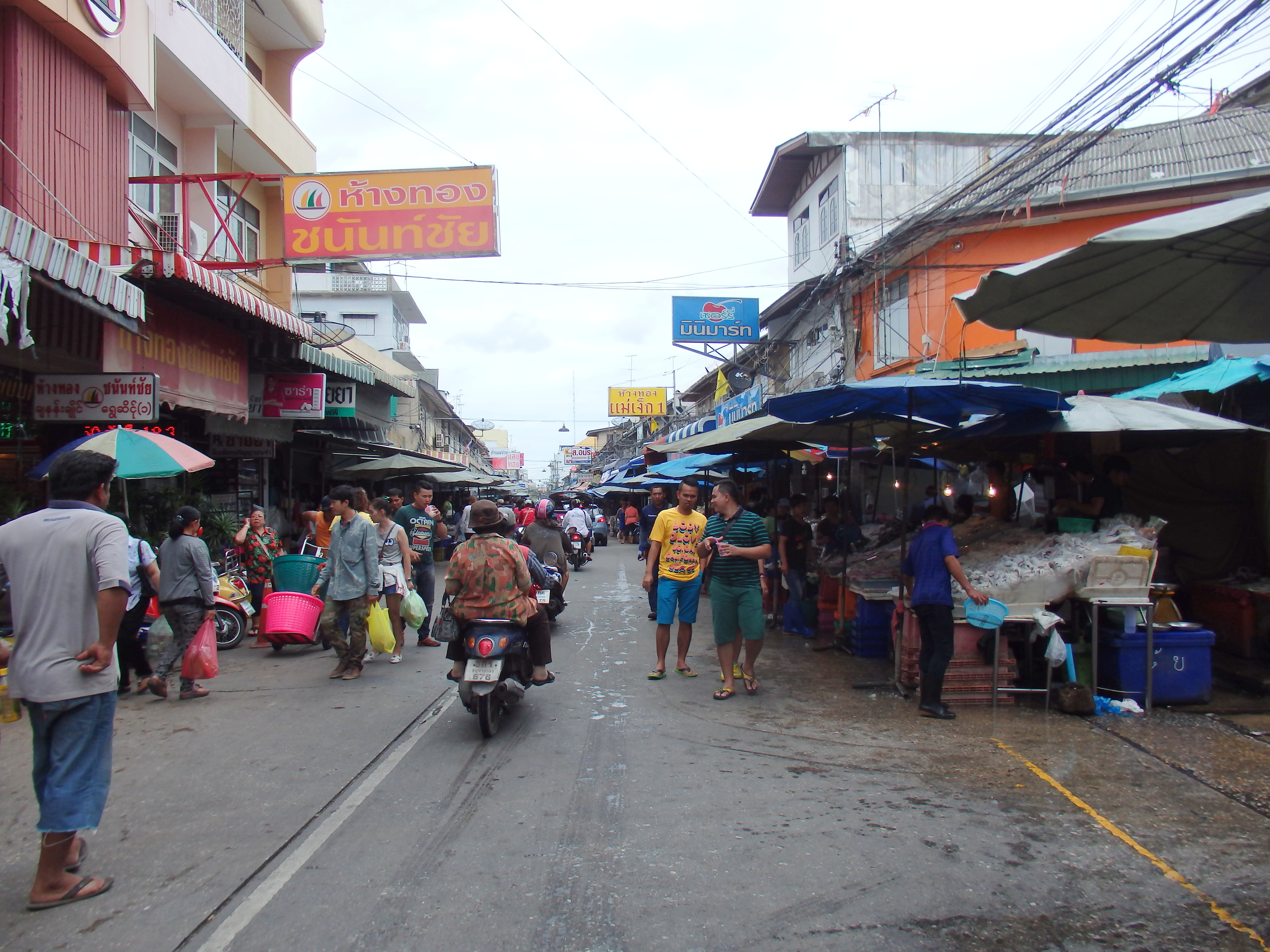
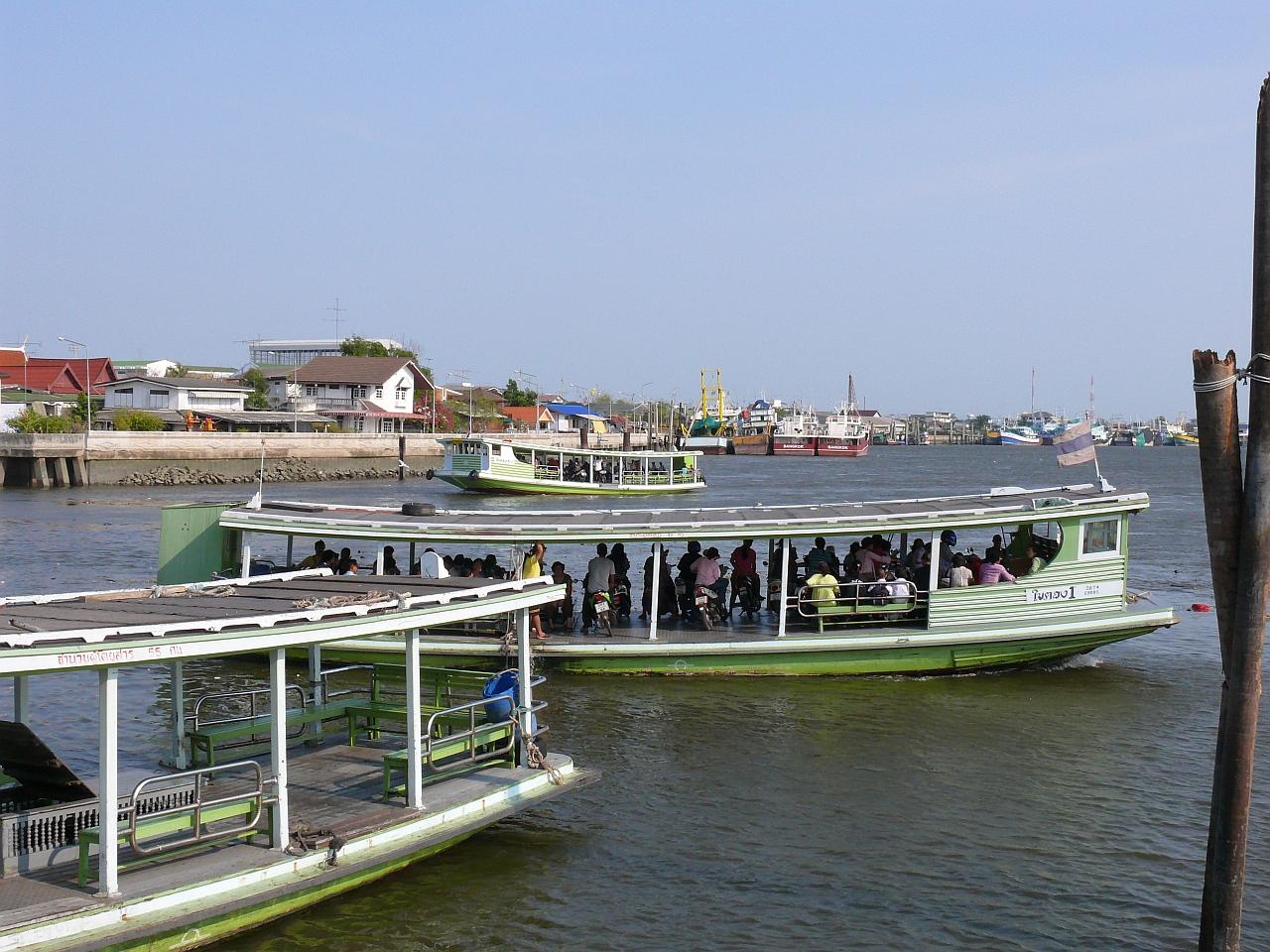
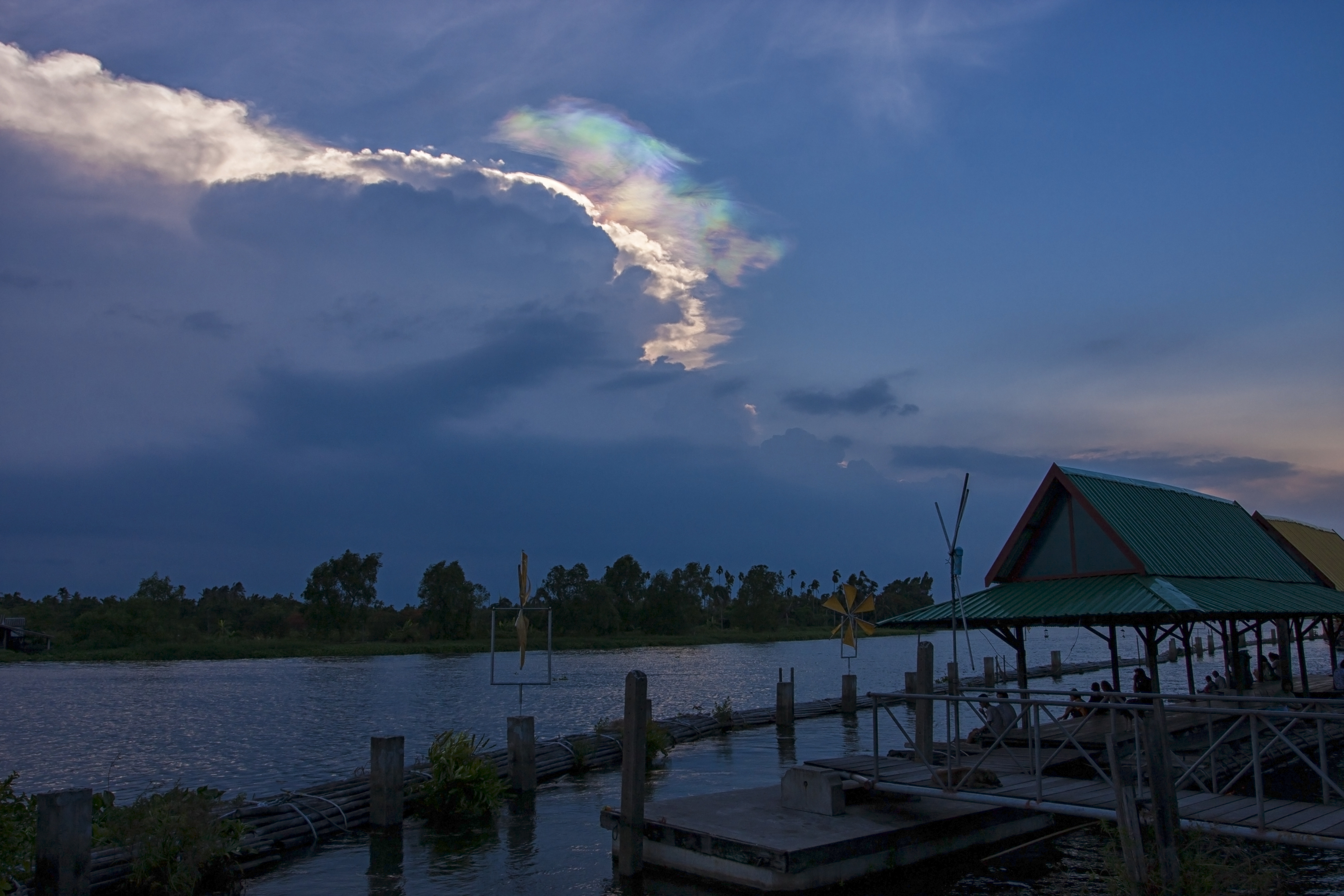
- From top: Phan Thai Norasing Shrine; Salt farming in Samut Sakhon; Red Bridge; Mahachai seafood market; Mahachai–Tha Chalom ferry; Tha Chin River in Krathum Baen at dusk

- Flag Seal
- Nickname: Mahachai (Thai: มหาชัย)
- Motto: เมืองประมง ดงโรงงาน ลานเกษตร เขตประวัติศาสตร์ ("City of fisheries. District of factories. Fields of farming. Historical area.")
- Map of Thailand highlighting Samut Sakhon province
- Country: Thailand
- Capital: Samut Sakhon

Government
  - Governor: Narit Niramaiwong (since 2024)

Area
  - Total: 866 km^{2} (334 sq mi)
  - Rank: 73rd

Population (2024 estimate)
  - Total: ▲590,867
  - Rank: 43rd
  - Density: 682/km^{2} (1,770/sq mi)
  - Rank: 6th

Human Achievement Index
  - HAI (2022): 0.6101 "low" Ranked 74th

GDP
  - Total: baht 398 billion (US$13.1 billion) (2019)
- Time zone: UTC+7 (ICT)
- Postal code: 74xxx
- Calling code: 034
- ISO 3166 code: TH-74
- Website: samutsakhon.go.th

Samut Sakhon Provincial Administrative Organization องค์การบริหารส่วนจังหวัดสมุทรสาคร
- Provincial Administrative Organization
- Interactive map of Samut Sakhon Provincial Administrative Organization

Government
  - Type: Local administrative divisions
  - Body: Samut Sakhon Provincial Administrative Organization
  - President: Udom Kraiwatnussorn
- Website: samutsakhonpao.go.th

Samut Sakhon (Thai: สมุทรสาคร, pronounced [sā.mùt sǎː.kʰɔ̄ːn]) is one of the central provinces (changwat) of Thailand, located along the coast of the Gulf of Thailand. In 2024, it had a population of 590,867, and an area of 866 km^{2} (334 sq mi), making it the 43rd most populated province whilst being the 4th smallest.

The province lies at the mouth of the Tha Chin River and forms part of the Bangkok Metropolitan Region. Salt pans line its coast, and the wreck of a Dvaravati-period ship built in the Arab tradition was excavated from a shrimp pond in the district of the provincial town.

Once an agricultural and fishing province, Samut Sakhon now holds several thousand factories, most of them small, and is among the most polluted provinces in the country.

== Toponymy ==
The word samut originates from the Sanskrit word samudra meaning 'ocean', and the word sakhon from Sanskrit sagara meaning 'lake'.

== Geography ==
Neighboring provinces are (from the southwest clockwise) Samut Songkhram, Ratchaburi, Nakhon Pathom, and Bangkok. Samut Sakhon is part of the Bangkok Metropolitan Region.
Samut Sakhon is at the mouth of the Tha Chin River, a distributary of the Chao Phraya River, to the Gulf of Thailand. At the coast are many salt pans used for harvesting sea salt. The total forest area is 42 km^{2} (16 sq mi) or 4.9 percent of provincial area.

=== Climate ===
Samut Sakhon province has a tropical savanna climate (Köppen climate classification category Aw). Winters are dry and warm. Temperatures rise until May. The monsoon season runs from May through October, with heavy rain and somewhat cooler temperatures during the day, although nights remain warm. Climatological data for the period 1981–2010: Maximum temperature is 39.7 °C (103.5 °F) in April and May and the lowest temperature is 12.0 °C (53.6 °F) in December. The highest average temperature is 35.4 °C (95.7 °F) in April and the minimum average temperature is 22.0 °C (71.6 °F) in December. Mean annual rainfall is 1648 millimeters. The maximum daily rainfall is 248 millimeters in May. Mean rainy days average 130 days per year.

== History ==
A wooden ship of the Dvaravati period was found in September 2013 in a shrimp pond at Phan Thai Norasing subdistrict in Mueang Samut Sakhon district, near Wat Wisutthiwarawat and about 8 km inland from the present coast. Known as the Phanom Surin wreck, it is about 25 m long and lay with its bow to the south. Excavation recovered a keel plank of 17.65 m and traces of two masts. The hull planks were pierced and sewn together with black cord, with brown caulking cord run between them, a technique of Arab shipbuilding. Preeyanuch Jumprom, who directed the excavation, gives the hull as about 20 by 8 m, with two spars of about 17.37 and 17.40 m, and the site as lying in an abandoned meander 2 m below the surface and 12 km east of the Tha Chin. The cargo included Guangdong storage jars incised with Chinese characters, nine bitumen-lined torpedo jars of Persian Gulf type, Persian turquoise-glazed ware, 224 betel nuts, rice, dammar, ivory, antler and local carinated cooking pots with soot on them. Three radiocarbon determinations on organic material calibrate to 680–740, 640–700 and 720–780 CE, while she describes the ship as ninth-century. The cargo included Tang ceramics of several kinds and large pointed-based storage vessels, or torpedo jars, made in the Middle East. Coconuts, betel nuts, timber, rice grains, deer antler and ivory were recovered with them. The excavation report dates the ship to the ninth or tenth century. The essays in Defining Dvāravatī place it in the late eighth or early ninth century.

The storage vessels are the first Persian Gulf torpedo jars reported from an archaeological context in Southeast Asia. One of them is inscribed in Pahlavi with the name Yazd-bōzēd, a form that indicates a Zoroastrian. The wreck has been described as the first secure archaeological evidence of West Asian merchants in the Dvaravati zone.

The oldest name of the area is Tha Chin ('Chinese pier'), probably referring to the fact that it was a trading port where Chinese junks arrived. In 1548 the city Sakhon Buri was established, and was renamed Mahachai in 1704 after the Khlong Mahachai which was dug then and connected with the Tha Chin River near the town. King Mongkut gave it its current name, but the old name Mahachai is still sometimes used by locals. It was established by the Act Establishing Changwat Samut Prakan, Changwat Nonthaburi, Changwat Samut Sakhon, and Changwat Nakhon Nayok, Buddhist Era 2489 (1946), which came into force on 9 May 1946.

== Economy and environment ==
Formerly an agricultural- and fisheries-based province, Samut Sakhon in 2020 has more than 6,000 factories, most of them small, employing fewer than 50 workers, and too small to warrant much attention from Thailand's Pollution Control Department (PCD). Small firms lack the budgets to install the environmental gear that would help protect the environment. As a result, Samut Sakhon is one of the most polluted provinces in the nation.

Soil and water samples from the industrial area of Mueang District were found to be contaminated with high levels of arsenic, lead, cadmium, chromium, zinc, copper, and nickel. High levels of persistent organic pollutants (POPS), byproducts of industrial processes, were present in eggs from free-range chickens. An egg tested by researchers was found to have 84 nanograms per kilogram of dioxins and furans, a level 33 times higher than the safety limit observed by the European Union.

The most polluted air in Thailand in 2018 was found to be in Samut Sakhon province. According to the PCD, the level of PM_{2.5} in the provincial atmosphere in 2019 was unusually high, measuring as high as 195 micrograms per cubic metre (μg/m^{3}). During the air pollution "season" of 2018–2019, PM_{2.5} levels exceeded the PCD's safe threshold of 50 μg/m^{3} for 41 days.

Samut Sakhon is a leading sea salt producer. According to a survey in 2011, 12,572 rai of salt pans were managed by 242 families in Samut Sakhon.

The number of factories in 2022 was 6,458 with a workforce of 372,282 people.

== Health ==
=== Hospitals ===
Samut Sakhon Hospital with 600 beds, is the main hospital of Samut Sakhon province, operated by the Ministry of Public Health.
In Mueang district there are also: Ekachai Hospital with 142 beds, Mahachai 3 Hospital with 180 beds, Jesada Vechakarn Hospital with 10 beds and Metropolitan Hospital Tha Chalom.
In Krathum Baen district operates the ministry a general hospital, Krathum Baen Hospital with 300 beds.
Ban Phaeo district is served by Ban Phaeo General Hospital with 323 beds, the only hospital public organisation in Thailand.

=== Health promoting hospitals ===
There are total fifty-four health-promoting hospitals in the province, of which; twenty-three in Mueang district, twelve in Krathum Baen district and nineteen in Ban Phaeo district.

== Education ==
Anno 2024, there are total 146 primary/secondary schools in the province, of which:

- Mueang district - 78 schools
- Krathum Baen district - 32 schools
- Ban Phaeo district - 36 schools

== Demographics ==
=== Population ===
Population history of Samut Sakhon province is as follows:

| 1947 | 1960 | 1970 | 1980 | 1990 | 2000 | 2011 | 2020 |
|---|---|---|---|---|---|---|---|
| 111,479 | 166,000 | 158,000 | 265,464 | 358,155 | 466,281 | 499,098 | 586,199 |

=== Religion ===
There are one hundred sixteen Theravada Buddhist temples in the province.
Seventy in Mueang district, fifteen in Krathum Baen district and thirty-one in Ban Phaeo district.

== Transportation ==
The province is the intersection of highway 35 eastbound (Bangkok route), highway 35 westbound (Pak Tho district, Ratchaburi province), Ekkachai road (no. 3242) (Chom Thong district, Bangkok), highway 4 eastbound (Bangkok route), south/west bound (southern Thailand).
The area is served by some fifteen bus lines.
Samut Sakhon is along the Maeklong Railway, operated by the State Railway of Thailand and is served by Mahachai railway station on the east bank of the Tha Chin River and Ban Laem railway station on the west bank.

== Symbols ==
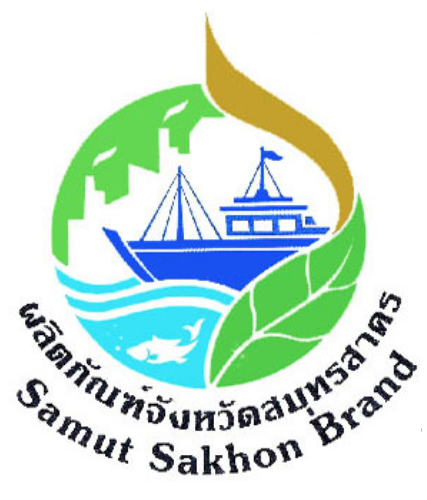
Brand

The provincial seal shows a Chinese junk in front of the coast, with a factory and a smoking chimney in the background. Both refer to the old trading tradition as well as the local industries.

The provincial flag is horizontally divided pink/light blue/pink (1:3:1) the provincial seal in the middle.

The provincial brand is a picture of a white factory, a fishing boat, a fish and blue water and a green leaf.

The provincial tree is commonly called blackboard tree or devil's tree (Alstonia scholaris).

The provincial aquatic animal is the short mackerel (Rastrelliger brachysoma) what with Samut Sakhon is the first province to have short mackerel fishing boat and has the largest amount of this species of fish caught in Thailand.

The provincial slogan is "Fishing city, factory town, agricultural ground, historic site".

== Administrative divisions ==
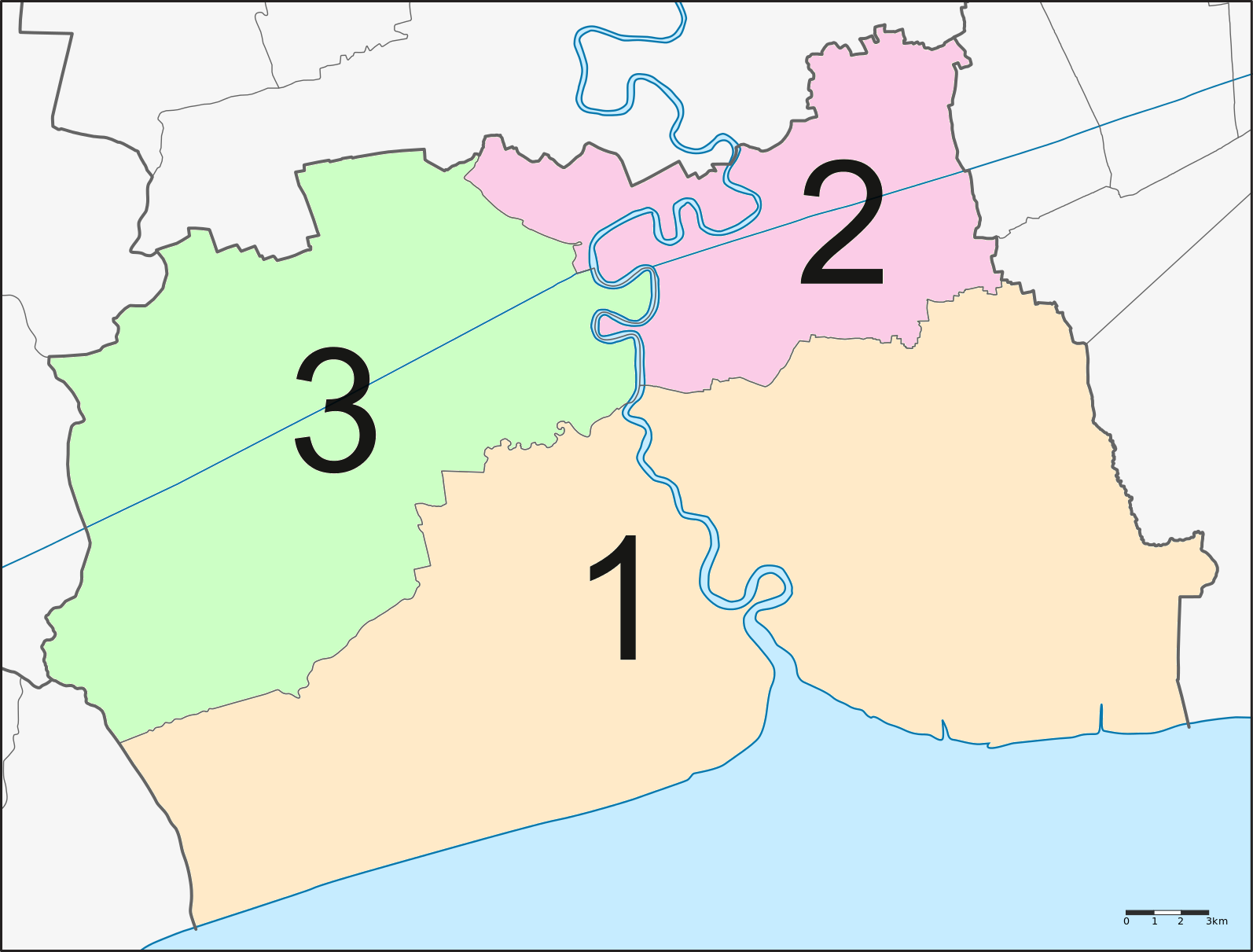
Map of Samut Sakhon province with districts

=== Central government ===
The province is divided into three districts (amphoes). The districts are further subdivided into 40 subdistricts (tambons) and 289 villages (mubans).

| District | Pop. | Subdistr. | Villages |
|---|---|---|---|
| Mueang Samut Sakhon | 305,698 | 18 | 116 |
| Krathum Baen | 183,903 | 12 | 76 |
| Ban Phaeo | 101,266 | 10 | 97 |
| Total | 590,867 | 40 | 289 |

=== Local government ===
As of December 2024 there are: one Samut Sakhon Provincial Administrative Organization (PAO) (ongkan borihan suan changwat) and sixteen municipal (thesaban) areas in the province. The capital Samut Sakhon and Om Noi have city (thesaban nakhon) status. Three have town (thesaban mueang) status and eleven are subdistrict municipalities (thesaban tambon).

| | City municipalities | people | LAO code | | | | |
| 1 | Om Noi | 53,914 | 03740201 | 2 | Samut Sakhon | 53,221 | 03740102 |

| | Town municipalities | people | LAO code | 2 | Krathum Baen. | 23,204 | 04740202 |
| 1 | Phanthai Norasing | 42,851 | 04740113 | 3 | Khlong Maduea. | 22,350 | 04740205 |

| | Subdistrict mun. | people | LAO code | 6 | Khok Krabue | 10,492 | 05740114 |
| 1 | Lak Ha | 42,296 | 05740303 | 7 | Khae Rai | 9,094 | 05740206 |
| 2 | Suan Luang | 39,007 | 05740203 | 8 | Don Kai Di | 8,624 | 05740204 |
| 3 | Na Di | 28,338 | 05740105 | 9 | Bang Pla | 7,650 | 05740103 |
| 4 | Bang Ya Phraek | 26,216 | 05740104 | 10 | Kaset Phatthana | 5,221 | 005740301 |
| 5 | Tha Chin | 10,984 | 05740106 | 11 | Ban Phaeo | 2,772 | 05740302 |

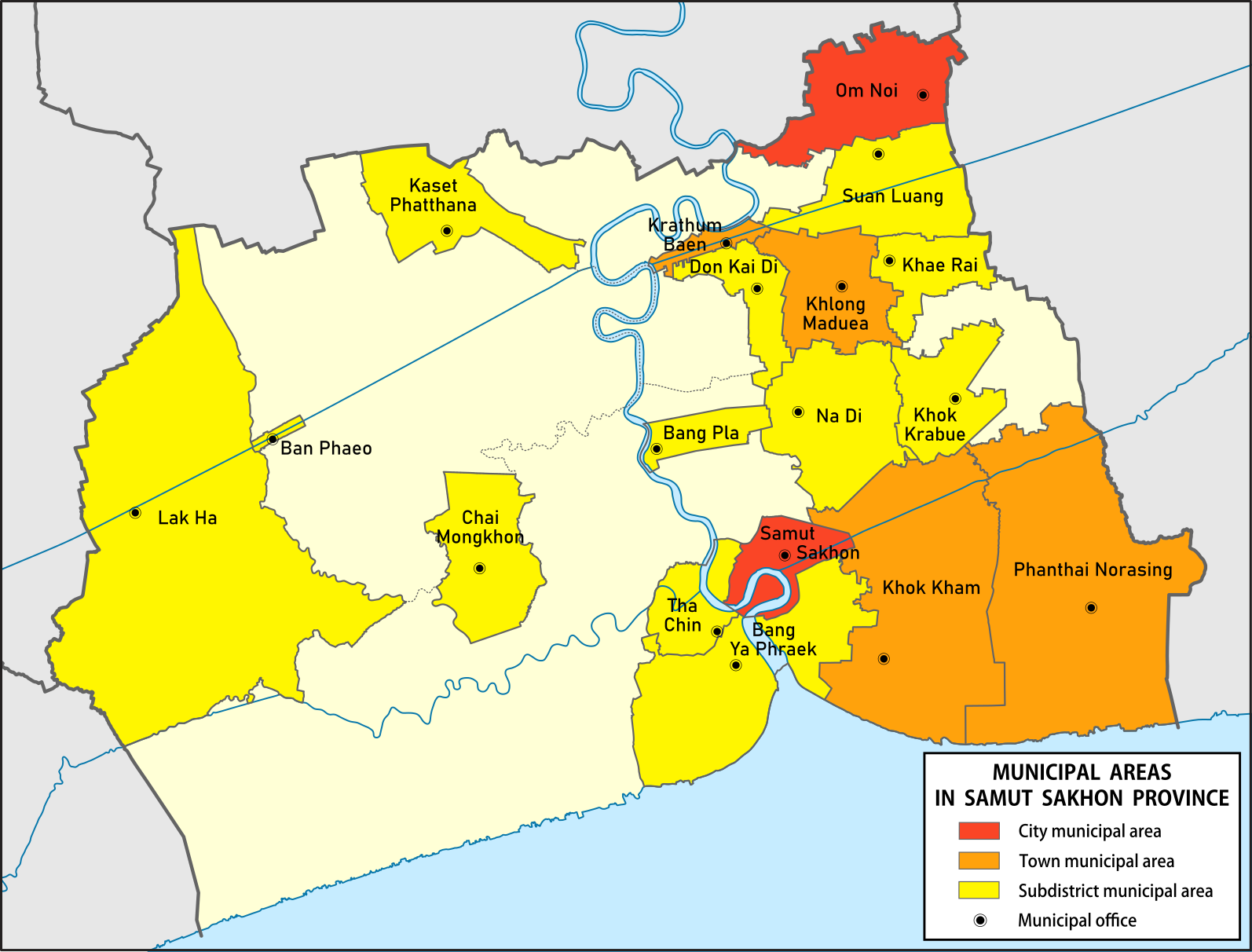
City municipalities (thesaban nakhon) Town municipalities (thesaban mueang) Subdistrict municipalities (thesaban tambon)

The non-municipal areas are administered by 21 'Subdistrict Administrative Organizations (SAO)' (ongkan borihan suan tambon):
Mueang Samut Sakhon - 10, Krathum Baen - 4 and Ban Phaeo - 7.

The communities, although not directly chosen by the local citizens, they provides advice and recommendations to the local administrative organization are:

| Municipality | Communities | Groups |
| Samut Sakhon | 32 | 3 |
| Om Noi | 28 | - |
| Krathum Baen | 9 | - |
| Khlong Maduea | 11 | - |
| Suan Luang | 14 | - |

== Human achievement index 2022 ==
| Health | Education | Employment | Income |
| 31 | 59 | 11 | 7 |
| Housing | Family | Transport | Participation |
| 77 | 9 | 3 | 72 |
Province Samut Sakhon, with an HAI 2022 value of 0.6101 is "low", occupies place 74 in the ranking.

Since 2003, United Nations Development Programme (UNDP) in Thailand has tracked progress on human development at sub-national level using the Human achievement index (HAI), a composite index covering all the eight key areas of human development. National Economic and Social Development Board (NESDB) has taken over this task since 2017.

| Rank | Classification |
| 1 - 13 | "high" |
| 14 - 29 | "somewhat high" |
| 30 - 45 | "average" |
| 46 - 61 | "somewhat low" |
| 62 - 77 | "low" |

Map with provinces and HAI 2022 rankings
