= Mueang Samut Sakhon district =

District of Thailand

Mueang Samut Sakhon เมืองสมุทรสาคร
- District
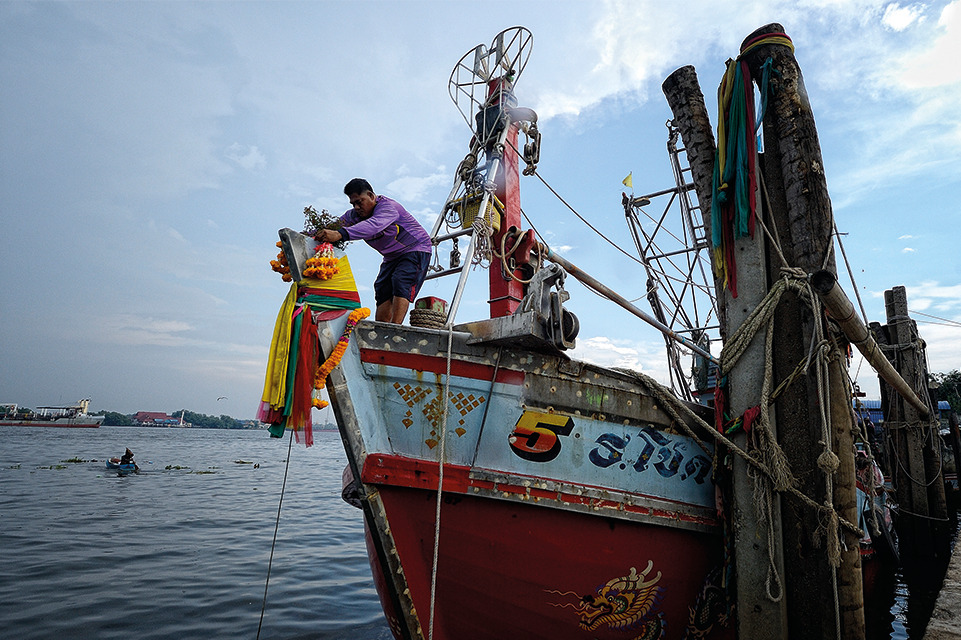
- Fishing boat at Tha Chalom

- District location in Samut Sakhon province
- Coordinates: 13°32′54″N 100°16′24″E
- Country: Thailand
- Province: Samut Sakhon
- District: Mueang Samut Sakhon

Area
  - Total: 492.04 km^{2} (189.98 sq mi)

Population (2024)
  - Total: 305,698
  - Density: 621/km^{2} (1,610/sq mi)
- Time zone: UTC+7 (ICT)
- Postal code: 74000
- Calling code: 034
- ISO 3166 code: TH-7401

Mueang Samut Sakhon (Thai: เมืองสมุทรสาคร, pronounced [mɯ̄aŋ sā.mùt.sǎː.kʰɔ̄ːn]) is the capital district (amphoe mueang) of Samut Sakhon province, central Thailand.

== History ==
Mueang Tha Chin dates back to the Ayutthaya Kingdom and was once administered by the Ministry of Defence. During his reign, King Maha Chakkraphat ordered the establishment of Mueang Sakhon Buri. Later, King Mongkut (Rama IV) renamed the city Samut Sakhon. In 1897, it was formally designated as Mueang Samut Sakhon District.

Despite the official name, locals still commonly refer to Mueang Samut Sakhon as Mahachai.

In addition to Mahachai, the city is also known by the Teochew name Lang-Ka-Su (Chinese: 龍仔厝; pinyin: Lóng zǐ cuò), which literally means "home of dragon descendants". This name has been recorded in Chinese historical texts for over a thousand years, suggesting that Samut Sakhon has long been home to Chinese settlers and people of Chinese descent. Its strategic location at the mouth of the Tha Chin River made it a prime site for maritime trade. To this day, Lang-Ka-Su remains a widely recognized informal name for the area.

In September 2013, the wreck of an ancient Arab trading ship was discovered at a shrimp farm in Phanthai Norasing Subdistrict, Mueang Samut Sakhon District. The ship was named the "Phanom-Surin Ship" after the couple who owned the land. It is considered the oldest shipwreck archaeological site ever found in Thailand and Southeast Asia.

The ship is believed to date back to the 9th century, corresponding to the Dvaravati period, and serves as compelling evidence that the Tha Chin River was once a key maritime route linking the Dvaravati Kingdom with the wider world.

== Geography ==
The general topography of the district is a coastal lowland about 1 meter above sea level. There are no islands, mountains or minerals. The main watercourse of Samut Sakhon, Tha Chin River flows into the Gulf of Thailand at Bang Ya Phraek subdistrict.
Neighbouring districts are (from the west clockwise): Mueang Samut Songkhram of Samut Songkhram province; Ban Phaeo and Krathum Baen of Samut Sakhon province; and Bang Bon and Bang Khun Thian of Bangkok. To the south is the Bay of Bangkok.

== Environment ==
Samut Sakhon province has more than 6,000 small- and medium-sized factories, many of them in this district. Soil and water samples from the industrial area of Mueang district were found to be contaminated with high levels of arsenic, lead, cadmium, chromium, zinc, copper, and nickel. High levels of persistent organic pollutants (POPS), byproducts of industrial processes, were present in eggs from free-range chickens. An egg tested by researchers was found to have 84 nanograms per kilogram of dioxins and furans, a level 33 times higher than the safety limit observed by the European Union.

== Administration ==
=== Provincial government ===
The district is divided into 18 subdistricts (tambons), which are further subdivided into 116 villages (mubans).

No.	Subdistricts	Thai	Villages	Pop.
1.	Mahachai	มหาชัย	-	40,986
2.	Tha Chalom	ท่าฉลอม	-	7,570
3.	Krokkrak	โกรกกราก	-	4,665
4.	Ban Bo	บ้านบ่อ	9	8,514
5.	Bang Tho Rat	บางโทรัด	10	8,500
6.	Ka Long	กาหลง	8	4,501
7.	Na Khok	นาโคก	6	3,639
8.	Tha Chin	ท่าจีน	7	10,984
9.	Na Di	นาดี	9	28,338
10.	Tha Sai	ท่าทราย	8	32,566
11.	Khok Krabue	คอกกระบือ	6	10,492
12.	Bang Nam Chuet	บางน้ำจืด	6	15,694
13.	Phanthai Norasing	พันท้ายนรสิงห์	8	42,851
14.	Khok Kham	โคกขาม	10	24,918
15.	Ban Ko	บ้านเกาะ	8	19,715
16.	Bang Krachao	บางกระเจ้า	9	11,448
17.	Bang Ya Phraek	บางหญ้าแพรก	6	26,216
18.	Chai Mongkhon	ชัยมงคล	6	4,101
		Total	116	305,698

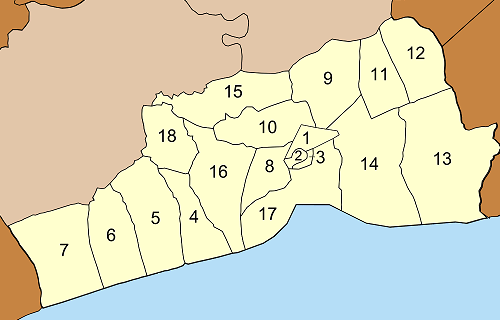
Map of subdistricts

=== Local government ===
As of December 2024 there are: seven municipalities (thesaban), of which Samut Sakhon itself has city status (thesaban nakhon) and covers the combined area of Mahachai, Tha Chalom and Krokkrak subdistricts. Phanthai Norasing is a town municipality (thesaban mueang) and covers the whole subdistrict. Bang Pla is a subdistrict municipality (thesaban tambon) which covers only village 4 of subdistrict Ban Ko. Four subdistricts completely form a subdistrict municipality: Bang Ya Phraek, Na Di, Tha Chin and Khok Krabue. The non-municipal areas are administered by ten subdistrict administrative organizations - SAO (ongkan borihan suan tambon - o bo toh).

Samut Sakhon city mun.	Pop.	03740102	sakhoncity.go.th
Mahachai	40,986		
Tha Chalom	7,570		
Krokkrak	4,665		
Total population	53,221		

Town municipality	Pop.	LAO code	website
Phanthai Norasing	42,851	04740113	pantainorasingh.go.th

Subdistrict municipality	Pop.	LAO code	website
Bang Pla	7,650	05740103	bangpla-skn.go.th
Bang Ya Phraek	26,216	05740104	bangyaphraek.go.th
Na Di	28,338	05740105	nadee.go.th
Tha Chin	10,984	05740106	thachin.go.th
Khok Krabue	10,492	05740114	khokkrabue.go.th

Subdistrict adm.org-SAO	Pop.	LAO code	website
Ka Long	4,501	06740107	kalong.go.th
Khok Kham	24,918	06740108	khokkhamlocal.go.th
Chai Mongkhon	4,101	06740109	chaimongkol-sk.go.th
Tha Sai	32,566	06740110	tasai-sk.go.th
Bang Tho Rat	8,500	06740111	bangtorad.go.th
Ban Bo	8,514	06740112	banbo.go.th
Na Khok	3,639	06740115	nakhok.go.th
Bang Krachao	11,448	06740116	bangkrachao.go.th
Bang Nam Chuet	15,694	06740117	bangnumjeud.go.th
Ban Ko	12,065	06740118	bankao.go.th

== Healthcare ==
=== Hospitals ===
There are in the district: Samut Sakhon Hospital with 600 beds, Ekachai Hospital with 142 beds, Mahachai 3 Hospital with 180 beds, Jesada Vechakarn Hospital with 10 beds and Metropolitan Hospital Tha Chalom.

=== Health promoting hospitals ===
There are total twenty-three health-promoting hospitals in the district, of which; one in every subdistrict, but Ban Bo, Ban Nam Chuet, Khok Kham, Ban Ko, Ban Krachao and Bang Ya Phraek each have two and Phantai Norasing has three.

== Religion ==
There are seventy Theravada Buddhist temples in the district.
One in Krokkrak, two in Tha Chalom, Na Di, Khok Krabue and Bang Nam Chuet, three in Ka Long, four in Ban Bo, Na Khok, Tha Sai, Khok Kham, Bang Ya Phraek and Chai Mongkhon, five in Mahachai, Tha Chin and Bang Krachao, six in Phanthai Norasing and Ban Ko and seven in Bang Tho Rat.

== Transportation ==
The district is the intersection of highway 35 eastbound (Bangkok route), highway 35 westbound (Pak Tho district, Ratchaburi province), Ekkachai road (no. 3242) (Chom Thong district, Bangkok).
There is Maeklong Railway a Wongwian Yai - Mahachai train service, starting from Wongwian Yai station, Bangkok, to Mahachai station (distance 33.1 kilometres (20.6 mi)) every day from 05.30-20.00 hrs, and a Tha Chalom - Mae Klong train service, starting from Ban Laem station, Tha Chalom subdistrict, to Maeklong station, Samut Songkhram (distance 33.7 kilometres (20.9 mi)).
