= Krathum Baen district =

Krathum Baen กระทุ่มแบน
- District
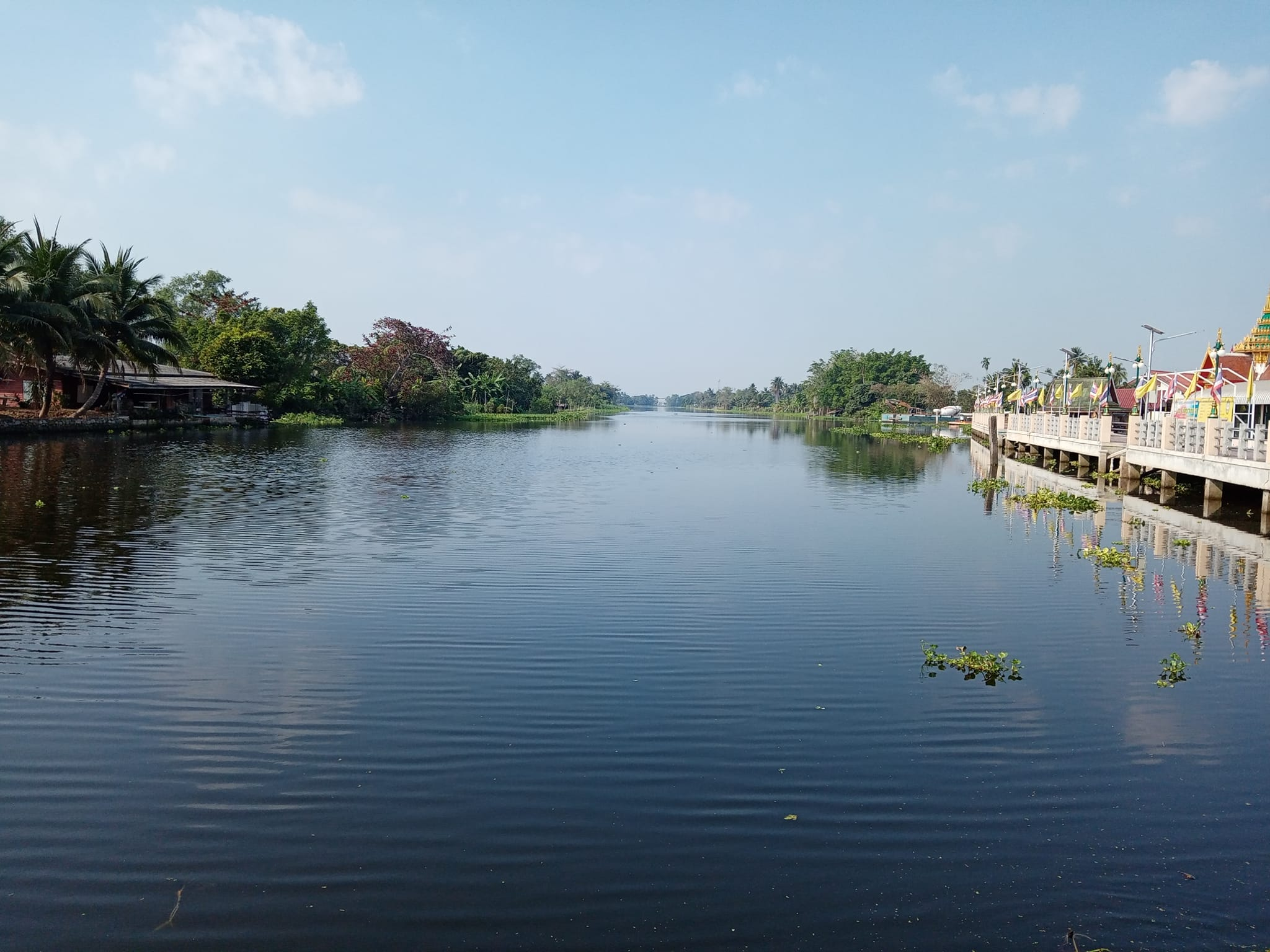
- Khlong Damnoen Saduak canal in the area of Krathum Baen, where it empties into the Tha Chin river

- District location in Samut Sakhon province
- Coordinates: 13°39′21″N 100°16′04″E
- Country: Thailand
- Province: Samut Sakhon

Area
  - Total: 135.276 km^{2} (52.230 sq mi)

Population (2024)
  - Total: 183,903
  - Density: 1,359/km^{2} (3,520/sq mi)
- Time zone: UTC+7 (ICT)
- Postal code: 74110, 74130
- Calling code: 034
- ISO 3166 code: TH-7402

Krathum Baen (Thai: กระทุ่มแบน, pronounced [krā.tʰûm bɛ̄ːn]) is a district (amphoe) in the northern part of Samut Sakhon province, central Thailand and is located west of Bangkok.

== History ==
Krathum Baen is a part of Mueang Samut Sakhon district. It was created in 1900. In 1926 the government added Tambons Tha Mai, Bang Yang, Nong Kok Khai, and Om Noi of Sam Phran district, Nakhon Pathom province to the district.

== Geography ==
Neighbouring districts are (from the north clockwise): Sam Phran of Nakhon Pathom province; Nong Khaem and Bang Bon of Bangkok; Mueang Samut Sakhon and Ban Phaeo of Samut Sakhon Province.

The important water resources are the Tha Chin river and Phasi Charoen canal.

== Toponymy ==
The name Krathum Baen meaning 'flat burflower-tree'.

== Administration ==
=== Provincial government ===
The district is divided into 10 subdistricts (tambons), which are further subdivided into 89 villages (mubans).

| No. | Subdistricts | Thai | Villages | Pop. |
|---|---|---|---|---|
| 1. | Krathum Baen | กระทุ่มแบน | - | 23,204 |
| 2. | Om Noi | อ้อมน้อย | 13 | 53,914 |
| 3. | Tha Mai | ท่าไม้ | 12 | 9,862 |
| 4. | Suan Luang | สวนหลวง | 13 | 39,007 |
| 5. | Bang Yang | บางยาง | 13 | 5,579 |
| 6. | Khlong Maduea | คลองมะด็อ | 11 | 22,350 |
| 7. | Nong Nok Kai | หนองนกไค | 8 | 3,856 |
| 8. | Don Kai Di | ดอนไก่ดี | 6 | 8,624 |
| 9. | Khae Rai | แคราย | 5 | 9,094 |
| 10. | Tha Sao | ท่าเสา | 8 | 8,413 |
| | | Total | 89 | 183,903 |

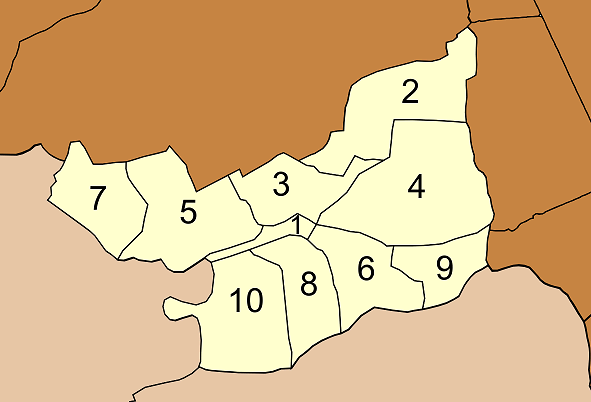
Map of subdistricts

=== Local government ===
As of December 2024 there are: six municipalities (thesaban), Om Noi has city status (thesaban nakhon), Krathum Baen and Khlong Maduea are town municipalities (thesaban mueang) and Suan Luang, Khae Rai and Don Kai Di are subdistrict municipalities (thesaban tambon), they all cover the subdistrict of the same name. The non-municipal areas are administered by four subdistrict administrative organizations - SAO (ongkan borihan suan tambon - o bo toh).

| City municipality | Pop. | LAO code | website |
|---|---|---|---|
| Om Noi | 53,914 | 03740201 | omnoi.go.th |

| Town municipality | Pop. | LAO code | website |
|---|---|---|---|
| Krathum Baen | 23,204 | 04740202 | ktb.go.th |
| Khlong Maduea | 22,350 | 04740205 | khlongmaduea.go.th |

| Subdistrict municipality | Pop. | LAO code | website |
|---|---|---|---|
| Suan Luang | 39,007 | 05740203 | suanluang.go.th |
| Khae Rai | 9,094 | 05740206 | khaerai.go.th |
| Don Kai Di | 8,624 | 05740204 | donkaidee.go.th |

| Subdistrict adm.org-SAO | Pop. | LAO code | website |
|---|---|---|---|
| Tha Mai | 9,862 | 06740207 | thamai.go.th |
| Tha Sao | 8,413 | 06740208 | thasao-smk.go.th |
| Bang Yang | 5,579 | 06740209 | bangyang.go.th |
| Nong Nok Khai | 3,856 | 06740210 | nongnokkai.go.th |

== Healthcare ==
=== Hospitals ===
There are in the district: Krathum Baen Hospital with 300 beds, Mahachai 2 Hospital with 200 beds and Vichaivaj International Hospital Om Noi with 196 beds.

=== Health promoting hospitals ===
There are total twelve health-promoting hospitals in the district, of which; one in every subdistrict, but Suan Luang, Khlong Maduea and Tha Sao each have two.

== Religion ==
There are fifteen Theravada Buddhist temples in the district.
One in Krathum Baen, Suan Luang, Nong Nok Khai and Tha Sao, two in Om Noi, Tha Mai, Khlong Maduea and Khae Rai, three in Bang Yang.

== Transportation ==
The district is the intersection of highway 4 eastbound (Bangkok route), south/west bound (southern Thailand).
The area is served by some fifteen bus lines.
