= Rama II Road =

Road in Thailand

Coordinates: 13.514429°N 100.153518°E

National Highway 35
- ทางหลวงแผ่นดินหมายเลข 35
- ถนนพระรามที่ 2 Rama II Road

Route information
- Length: 84.041 km (52.221 mi)
- Existed: 1973–present

Major junctions
- Northeast end: Suk Sawat Rd. in Chom Thong, Bangkok
- Southwest end: Phet Kasem Rd. in Pak Tho, Ratchaburi

Location
- Country: Thailand

Highway system
- Highways in Thailand; Motorways; Asian Highways

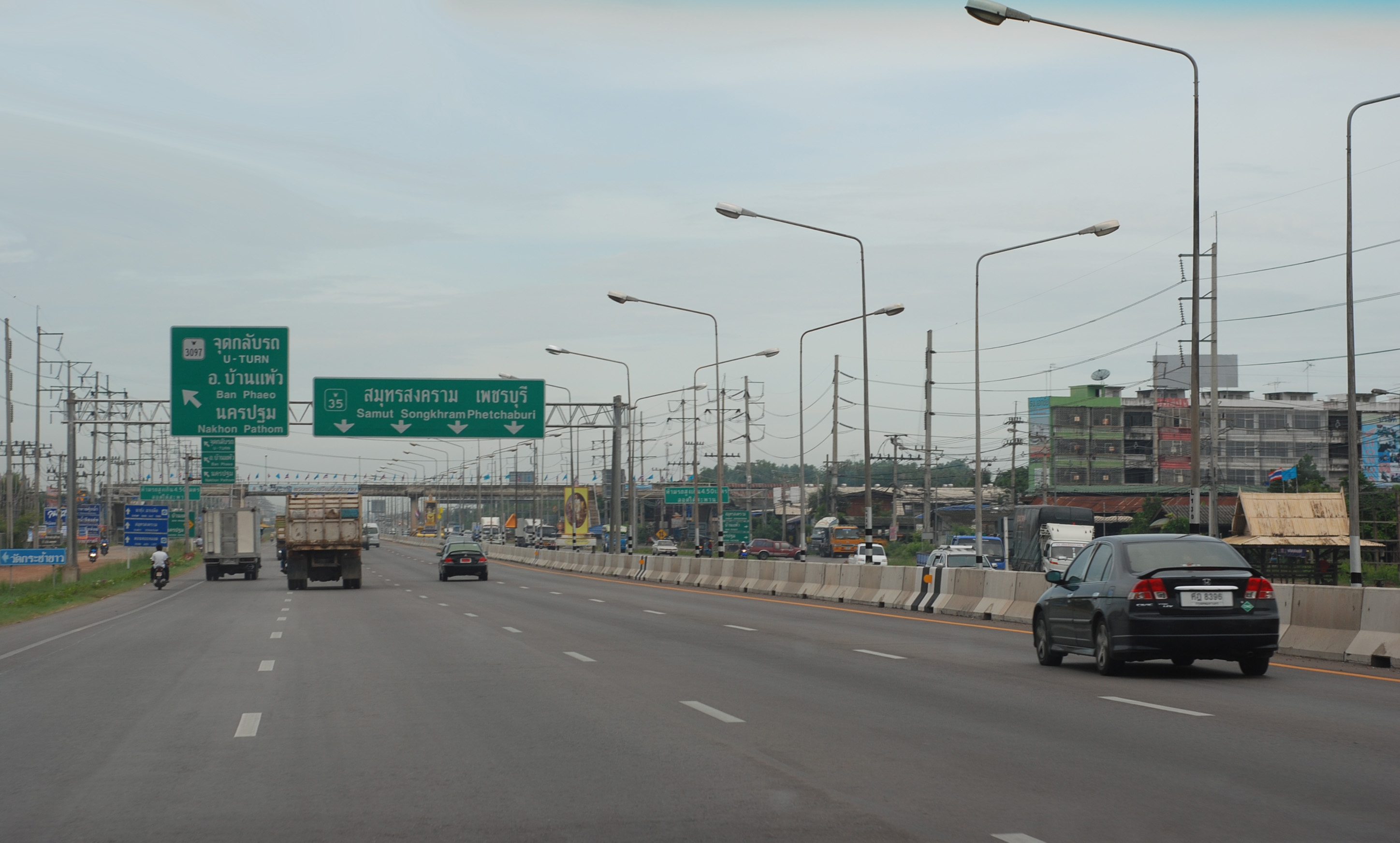
Rama II Road in the area of Samut Sakhon Province

Rama II Road (Thai: ถนนพระรามที่ 2, RTGS: Thanon Phra Ram Thi Song; usually shortened to ถนนพระราม 2, Thanon Phra Ram Song) or Highway 35 (ทางหลวงแผ่นดินหมายเลข 35, Thang Lauang Phaendin Mai Lek 35) is a road in Thailand heading towards the south. Rama II Road starts from Chom Thong District in the Thonburi side of Bangkok, passing through Bang Khun Thian District into Samut Sakhon Province. It then enters Samut Songkhram Province and terminates at a junction with Phet Kasem Road (Highway 4) in Ratchaburi Province, with a total distance of 84.041 kilometres (52.221 mi). The road is maintained by the Department of Highways.

== History ==
Rama II Road was built during the government of Field Marshal Thanom Kittikachorn with a total budget of approximately 419 million baht and was officially opened on 1 April 1973. It was named "Rama II" in honor of King Phutthaloetla Naphalai (Rama II) of the Chakri dynasty, who was born in present-day Samut Songkhram Province.

Construction began in 1970, divided into 3 phases:

1. Thonburi to Samut Sakhon, a distance of 29 km, construction cost 180 million baht
2. Samut Sakhon to Samut Songkhram, a distance of 36 km, construction cost 142 million baht
3. Samut Songkhram to meet Phet Kasem Road at the km 125.5 in area of Pak Tho District, Ratchaburi Province, distance 19 km, along with Somdet Phra Phutthaloetla Naphalai Bridge, the bridge over Mae Klong River, including construction cost 99 million baht.

Upon its completion, the road became an important travel route which shortened the travel time to the south, bypassing Phet Kasem Road and helping to divert its traffic. A side effect of the road's construction was that the Maeklong Railway line became less frequented and unprofitable, but still could not be retired due to some villages remaining accessible only by train.

=== Ongoing construction projects and accidents ===
There has been widespread criticism that Rama II Road is an "unfinished road" or "endless road" due to constant repairs and new construction projects, which have lasted from the initial construction in the 1970s up to the present: as of 2024, there were four ongoing projects on the road, due to finish in 2025. Therefore, it resembles a road that was never completed. The impact of constant construction has led to many fatal accidents and traffic congestion problems, which have been blamed as a contributing factor towards the decline of popular tourist destinations like Hua Hin.

From 2018 to 2025, Thailand’s Department of Highways recorded at least 140 deaths and 1,300 injuries from over 2,200 construction-linked accidents on Rama II Road.

=== 2024 Rama II Road crane collapse ===
At 4:13 am on 29 November 2024, a launching gantry crane and precast concrete segments collapsed on the outbound side of Rama II Road at the construction site of the Ekkachai - Ban Phaeo Intercity Motorway 82 (M82) section in Khok Krabue Subdistrict, Mueang Samut Sakhon District, Samut Sakhon Province, resulting in six deaths and eight injuries. All the victims were workmen.

=== 2025 Rama III–Dao Khanong Expressway collapse ===
On 15 March 2025, a section of the under-construction Dao Khanong Expressway Bridge collapsed onto Rama II Road, causing seven confirmed deaths.
