= Khlong Bang Bon subdistrict =

Khlong Bang Bon คลองบางบอน
- Khwaeng
- Khlong Bang Bon
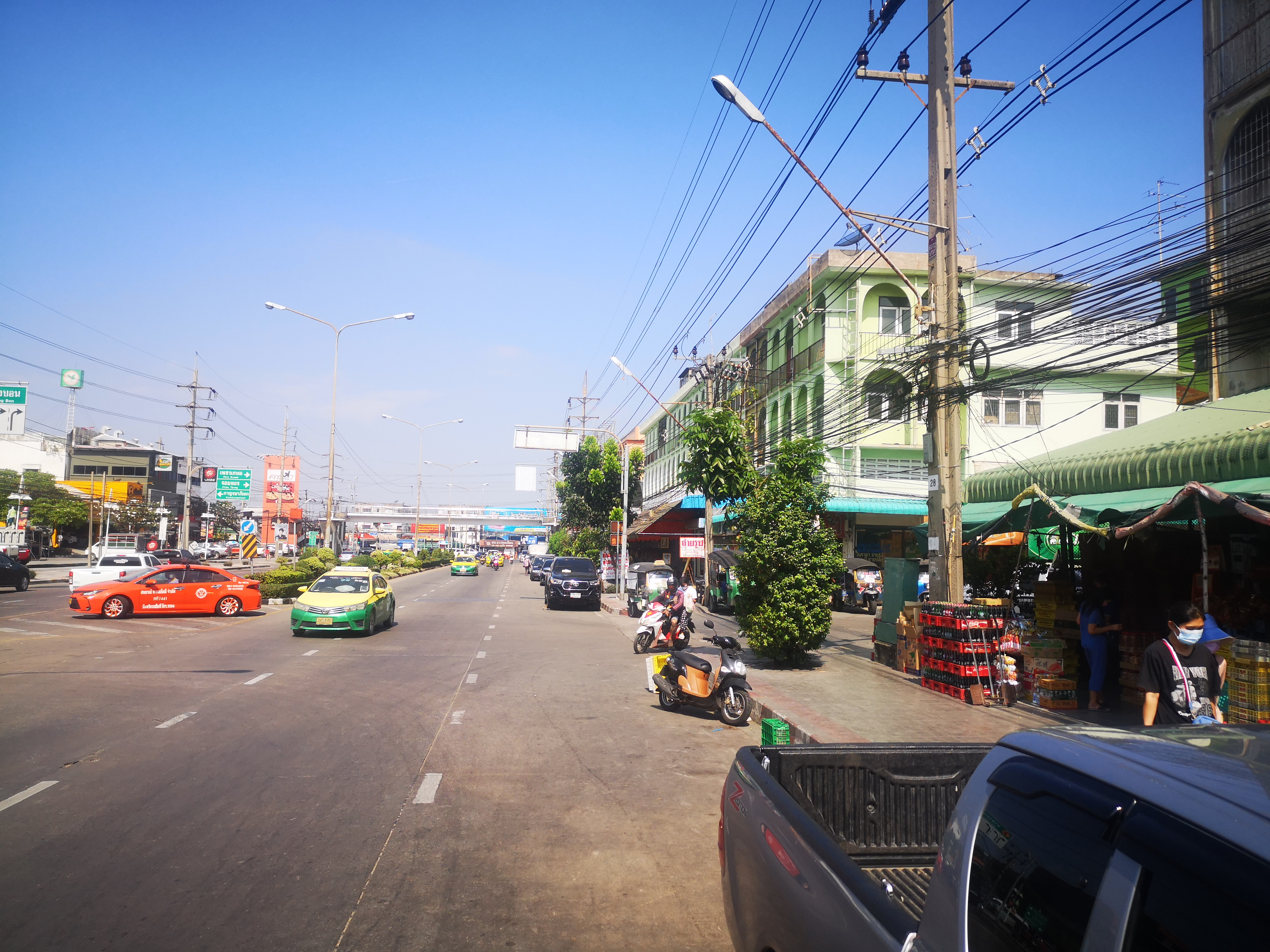
- Bang Khun Thian Road in the portion of Bang Bon Market
- Etymology: "Bang Bon canal"
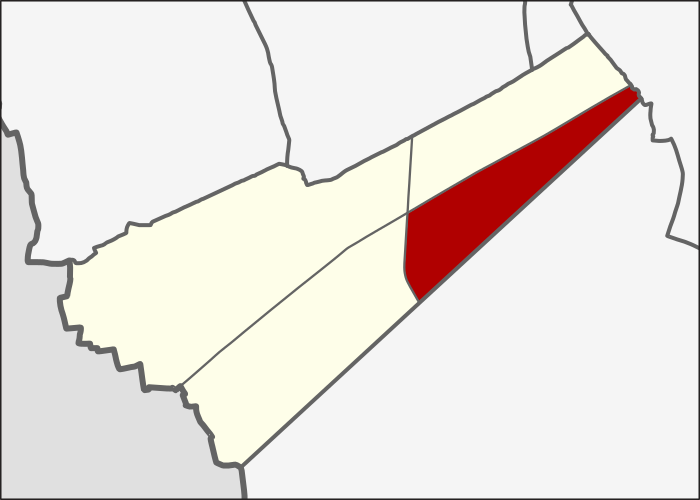
- Location in Bang Bon district
- Country: Thailand
- Province: Bangkok
- Khet: Bang Bon
- Named for: Khlong Bang Bon

Area
  - Total: 5.180 km^{2} (2.000 sq mi)

Population (2021)
  - Total: 24,008
  - Density: 4,634.75/km^{2} (12,003.9/sq mi)
- Time zone: UTC+7 (ICT)
- Postcode: 10150
- Area code: (+66) 02
- Geocode: 105005

Khlong Bang Bon (Thai: คลองบางบอน, pronounced [kʰlɔ̄ːŋ bāːŋ bɔ̄ːn]) is a khwaeng (subdistrict) of Bang Bon District in southwest Bangkok.

== History ==
Khlong Bang Bon in the past was part of Bang Bon Subdistrict in Bang Khun Thian District. Subsequently, on March 6, 1998, the Ministry of Interior transferred Bang Bon Subdistrict to the newly established Bang Bon District.

Later, on July 26, 2017, the Bangkok Metropolitan Administration (BMA) announced the dissolution of Bang Bon Subdistrict and the establishment of four new subdistricts using the east side of Kanchanaphisek Road (Motorway 9) and the north side of Ekkachai Road (Highway 3242) as the demarcation line between them.

The lower northeastern area of the former Bang Bon Subdistrict was named Khlong Bang Bon Subdistrict, after the local canal Khlong Bang Bon that flows through the area along the northeast-southwest.

== Geography ==
Its neighbours, clockwise from north, are Khlong Bang Phran in its district (Ekkachai Road is a demarcation line), Bang Khun Thian in Chom Thong District (Khlong Wat Sing is a demarcation line), Samae Dam in Bang Khun Thian District (Maeklong Railway is a demarcation line), and Bang Bon Tai in its district (Kanchanaphisek Road is a demarcation line).
