= Khlong Pittayalongkorn =

Canal in Thailand

Coordinates: 13°30′50″N 100°16′42″E

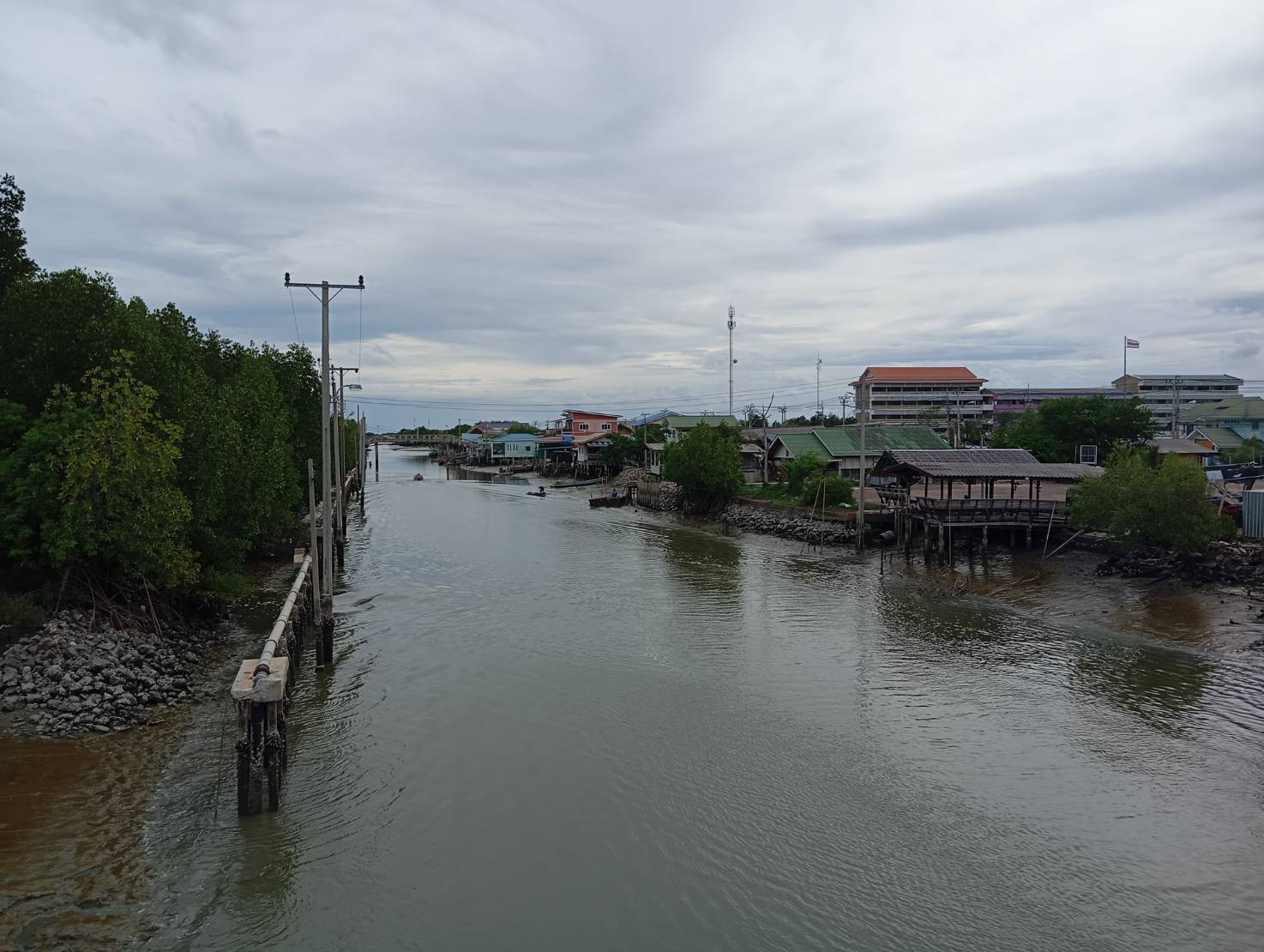
The Khlong Pittayalongkorn in the Bang Khun Thian section

Khlong Pittayalongkorn (Thai: คลองพิทยาลงกรณ์, RTGS: Khlong Phitthaya Longkhon, pronounced [kʰlɔːŋ pʰít.tʰā.jāː loŋ.kɔːn]) is a khlong (canal) in Thailand. It is a man-made waterway that runs along the upper coast of the Gulf of Thailand, passing through three adjacent provinces: Samut Sakhon, Bangkok, and Samut Prakan.

A man-made canal constructed for irrigation and salt farming along the seashore, branching off from the Tha Chin river near Wat Srisuttharam in Mueang Samut Sakhon district, Samut Sakhon province. Its course connects to the Khlong Sanphasamit and the Chao Phraya river in Phra Samut Chedi district, Samut Prakan province. It is approximately 27 km (16.8 mi) long, with two rural roads, SK.4017 and SK.503, running along both sides of the waterway.

The area around the mouth of the Tha Chin river was originally state-owned wasteland. Over time, local inhabitants encroached upon and cleared the land for cultivation, prompting the government to enact legislation in 1938 designating the area as a restricted zone for salt farming. Subsequently, the Khlong Pittayalongkorn was excavated to provide a connection to the Khlong Sanphasamit.

The section of the canal that flows through Tha Kham subdistrict in Bang Khun Thian district, on the outskirts of Bangkok, supports communities engaged in fishing and aquaculture. It also represents the last remaining habitat and foraging ground for the final population of smooth-coated otters in the city. These otters have demonstrated remarkable adaptability to human-inhabited environments. While they primarily build their dens and reside in riverside forests, they regularly venture into surrounding areas to forage and explore. Additionally, they often rest or rub their bodies against surfaces to remove ticks and other parasites from their fur, including on the floors of human-made structures. Some groups have even been observed taking shelter in cavities beneath buildings.
