= Central Rama 2 =

Shopping mall in Bangkok, Thailand

Central Rama 2 เซ็นทรัล พระราม 2
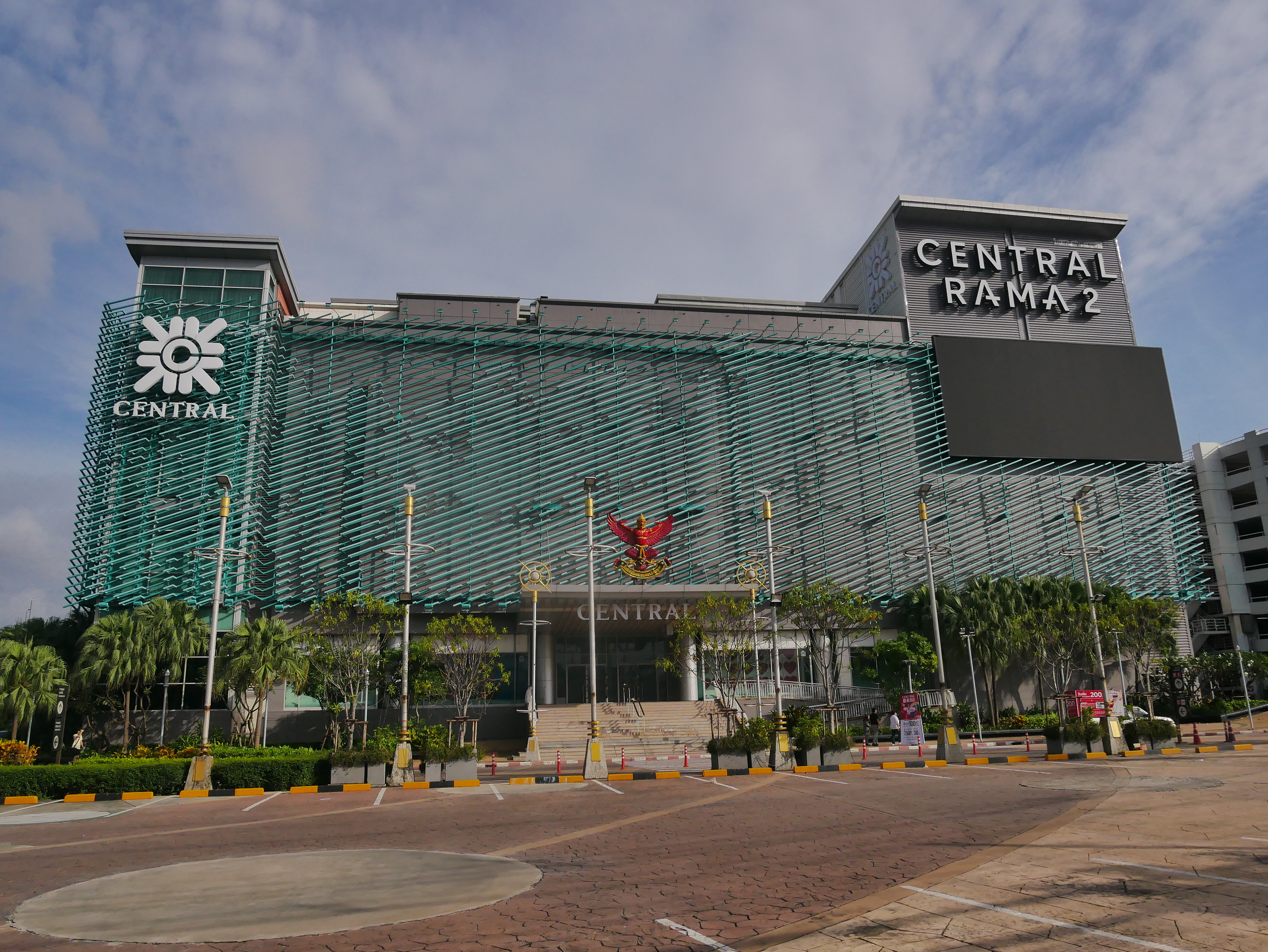
- Central Rama II in 2022
- Location: Bang Khun Thian, Bangkok 10150, Thailand
- Coordinates: 13.663395°N 100.438031°E
- Address: 128 Moo 6, Samae Dum Sub-District
- Opened: December 3, 2002
- Developer: Central Pattana
- Manager: Duangsamorn Charoenbunditchai
- Owner: Central Pattana
- Num. of stores: 352
- Floor area: 100,329 square metres (1,079,930 sq ft)
- Floors: 5
- Parking: 3,200
- Website: shoppingcenter.centralpattana.co.th/th/branch/central-rama-2

Central Rama 2 (previously known as Central Plaza Rama 2) (THAI : เซ็นทรัลพระรามสอง) is shopping center located on Rama II Road in Bang Khun Thian district, Bangkok, Thailand. It is the top shopping complex in Thailand. The complex has 350 stores, Co-working space, cinema and a pet community zone. It is owned by the company Central Pattana. The mall opened In 2002.

== Overview ==
The shopping center has a total of five floors. The shopping center is located on the main highway south of Bangkok in a rapidly expanding and densely populated residential area. The plaza has a retail shopping center, a Central Department Store, a supermarket, a food court, a 38-lane bowling alley and a 9-screen cinema multiplex.

== Facilities ==
The project is located on the highway connecting to the South and in a residential area that is continuously expanding. It is composed of shops, the Central Department Store, a supermarket, a food court, and a popular entertainment center.

Tops is a famous in Thailand, originally established in collaboration by the former parent company of U.S.-based Tops Markets LLC. In Thailand, it processes under the name Tops Supermarket and is managed by Central Food Retail, an associated company of Central Retail Corporation. Tops Food Hall is a premium supermarket offering a wide selection of household goods, fresh fruits and vegetables, dairy products, meats, and seafood. It also includes a wine cellar, a food court, and various restaurants and fast food outlets.

Uniqlo's largest store in South-East Asia is situated in Thailand, where the brand's first branch was established.

Central Rama 2 is known as the second large shopping mall on the Thonburi side. Most of the restaurants are located on the G and 4th floors. The G floor is made up of a Tops Supermarket, a food court, and various beverage and snack restaurants such as Starbucks and Waraporn Salapao. The 4th floor is known for hosting many of these dining options.

A community for family lovers is designed with the concept of Family Well-Being & Inclusive Community. A large playground is provided to delight the children, featuring the Kidzoona zone and Joyliday zone, where endless fun is offered, known as 'The Infinite of Joy'.

== Anchors ==
- Central The Store @ Rama 2
- Tops Food Hall
- Go! Wholesale (Old Tops Club)
- Major Cineplex 9 Cinemas
- Power Buy x B2S
- Officemate
- Supersports
- Central Foodpark
  - Food Park
  - Food Patio
- Fitness First
- Rama II Hall

== Construction ==
Construction of CentralPlaza Rama 2 began in November, 2000 by K-TECH construction public company limited. The client is Central Pattana PCL. This project included a five-storey building with a basement. Central Rama 2 has a total usage area of 260,000 sq. m. The total area is 96 rai including architecture, power line and M&E works. The budget of this project is 4075 million baht. The theme of this shopping center is galaxy of the universe.

== Location ==
160 Rama II Road, Samaedam, Bang Khun Thian district, Bangkok, 10150

- Bus

Bus 68, 76, 105, 140, 141, 142, 169, 172, 173: These buses pass by or stop near Central Rama 2. Check bus schedules and maps to ensure they go from one's location (Viabus).

- Personal car:

From central Bangkok, take Rama II Road (Highway 35) heading south. Central Rama 2 is located along this road. If one is coming from central areas like Sukhumvit or Silom, one can take Sathon Road or Ratchadapisek Road to connect with Rama II Road. There is ample parking at Central Rama 2, so finding a spot should not be an issue.

- Landmarks:

One will see Big C Supercenter Rama 2 located opposite CentralRama 2.

== Nearby attractions ==
- Nakornthon Hospital Major regional hospital located 500m south-west on the same side of Rama II.
- Residence
  - Park Village Rama 2
  - Vista Park Rama 2
  - Town Avenue Cocos Rama 2
  - Golden Neo Rama 2
  - Pruksa Ville 68 Rama2
  - The Grand Rama 2
- Education
  - BASIS International School of Bangkok is a top-tier International School located adjacent to Central Park.
  - Hands On Education Consultant
  - Kido Educare Center
- Business
  - TCI global ventures

== History ==
Central Rama 2 opened in June 2002, and since then, Rama II Road has developed into a major economic artery, serving as the main route to the South and linking numerous communities in the West and central Bangkok. The area has evolved into a bustling center for shopping and activities, drawing visitors from southern Bangkok and nearby provinces. This research employed a qualitative longitudinal approach to examine the environmentally sustainable practices of Centara Hotels & Resorts between 2015 and 2020. Document analysis was used to assess the qualitative data.

The company’s annual Scope 1 and Scope 2 greenhouse gas emissions increased throughout the study, corresponding with its operational demands. For the renovation control of Central Rama 2, based on the changed design look is to consider green space, seamless system elements and easy to use in a new urbanized lifestyle. Another plan is to explore, including the largest green space in Rama 2, a new lung for families in the Rama 2 area with a large green space of more than 40 rai, which was completed in 2022, meeting the needs of consumers looking for an outdoor relaxation area and to connect with nature.

== See also ==
- List of shopping malls in Thailand
