= 7th Cycle Birthday Anniversary Park, Bang Bon =

Park in Bangkok, Thailand

- Interactive map of 7th Cycle Birthday Anniversary Park, Bang Bon
- Type: Urban park
- Location: 563 Soi Rama II 82, Bang Bon Tai, Bang Bon, Bangkok
- Coordinates: 13°38′41.0″N 100°23′51.5″E
- Area: 39 acres (16 ha)
- Created: 2011
- Operator: Bangkok Metropolitan Administration (BMA)
- Status: Open year round
- Public transit: Rang Pho railway station

7th Cycle Birthday Anniversary Park, Bang Bon (Thai: สวนสาธารณะเฉลิมพระเกียรติฯ 7 รอบ บางบอน) is an urban park in Bangkok, Thailand.

== History & concept ==
The park is constructed on an area of 100 rai (16 ha; 40 acres) of the Crown Property Bureau (CPB), with 9 royal projects of King Bhumibol Adulyadej (Rama IX) as the main design concept, consisting of

1. The Kaem Ling Project (โครงการแก้มลิง – Monkey Cheeks Project): project to build a retention pond to solve the flood problem.
2. Natural Water Treatment Project (โครงการบำบัดน้ำด้วยวิธีธรรมชาติ)
3. Sufficiency Economy Philosophy (ปรัชญาเศรษฐกิจพอเพียง): sufficiency economy philosophy (SEP) by the King Rama IX
4. Royal Initiative Project on Wildlife Conservation (โครงการพระราชดำริเรื่องการอนุรักษ์สัตว์ป่า)
5. Reforestation Project: 3 Forests, 4 Benefits (โครงการปลูกป่า 3 อย่าง 4 ประโยชน์)
6. Soil Rehabilitation and Conservation Project (โครงการฟื้นฟูและอนุรักษ์ดิน)
7. Integrated Agriculture Project (โครงการเกษตรผสมผสาน)
8. Elaborate Agriculture Project (โครงการเกษตรปราณีต)
9. Energy Crop Project (โครงการปลูกพืชพลังงาน)

Hence, the park is also known as "9 Hills Park" (สวน 9 เนิน) according to its design.

It was built to celebrate the 84th birthday (7th cycle) of the King Rama IX in 2011. It was completed in first phase and opened for available in September 2018 and was full completed in December the same year.

Inside the park, there are an exhibition hall displays the royal projects, a floating amphitheatre, a bridge over the lake, a scenic view point, and many photo spots. There is also a concrete running track around the park, with a total distance of 1 km (0.6 mi). With an area of 100 rai, it is the 10th largest urban park in Bangkok.

== Location ==
The park is located on Rama II Soi 82 (Soi Rang Pho), Bang Bon Tai subdistrict, Bang Bon district, on the southwest suburbs of Bangkok, between two highways, Rama II (Highway 35) and Kanchanaphisek Roads (Motorway 9).
