= Thian Thale Phatthana Phrueksa Phirom Park =

Park in Bangkok, Thailand

- Interactive map of Thian Thale Phatthana Phrueksa Phirom Park
- Type: Urban park
- Location: Tha Kham, Bang Khun Thian, Bangkok
- Coordinates: 13°37′12″N 100°26′22″E
- Area: 14.63 acres (5.92 ha)
- Operator: Bangkok Metropolitan Administration (BMA)
- Status: Open daily from 5.00 a.m. to 9.00 p.m.

Thian Thale Phatthana Phrueksa Phirom Park (Thai: สวนเทียนทะเลพัฒนาพฤกษาภิรมย์, pronounced [ˈsǔan tʰian tʰaʔ.leː pʰát.tʰa.naː pʰrɯk.saː.pʰí.rōm]) is an urban park in Bang Khun Thian district, Bangkok, Thailand.

The park opened in early 2023 as an ecological mangrove forest park, and is part of the Green Bangkok 2030 initiative to expand green spaces in the city.

It features a 910 m (2,986 ft) jogging and walking track, along with a 1,130 m (3,707 ft) cycling path. A highlight is the 246 m (807 ft) mangrove nature trail with a wide variety of mangrove and coastal plant species. The park is also equipped with three restroom facilities.

In addition, the park serves as a dog park, allowing visitors to bring their pets into designated areas. It is the third official dog park in Bangkok, following Wacharaphirom Park in Bang Khen district and Bang Khae Phirom Park in Bang Khae district.

The park can be accessed by private car, as well as by BMTA bus routes 4-12 (68), 171, 4-27E (173)
