= Samae Dam =

Sub-district in Bangkok, Thailand

Coordinates: 13.660761°N 100.435370°E

Samae Dam แสมดำ
- Khwaeng
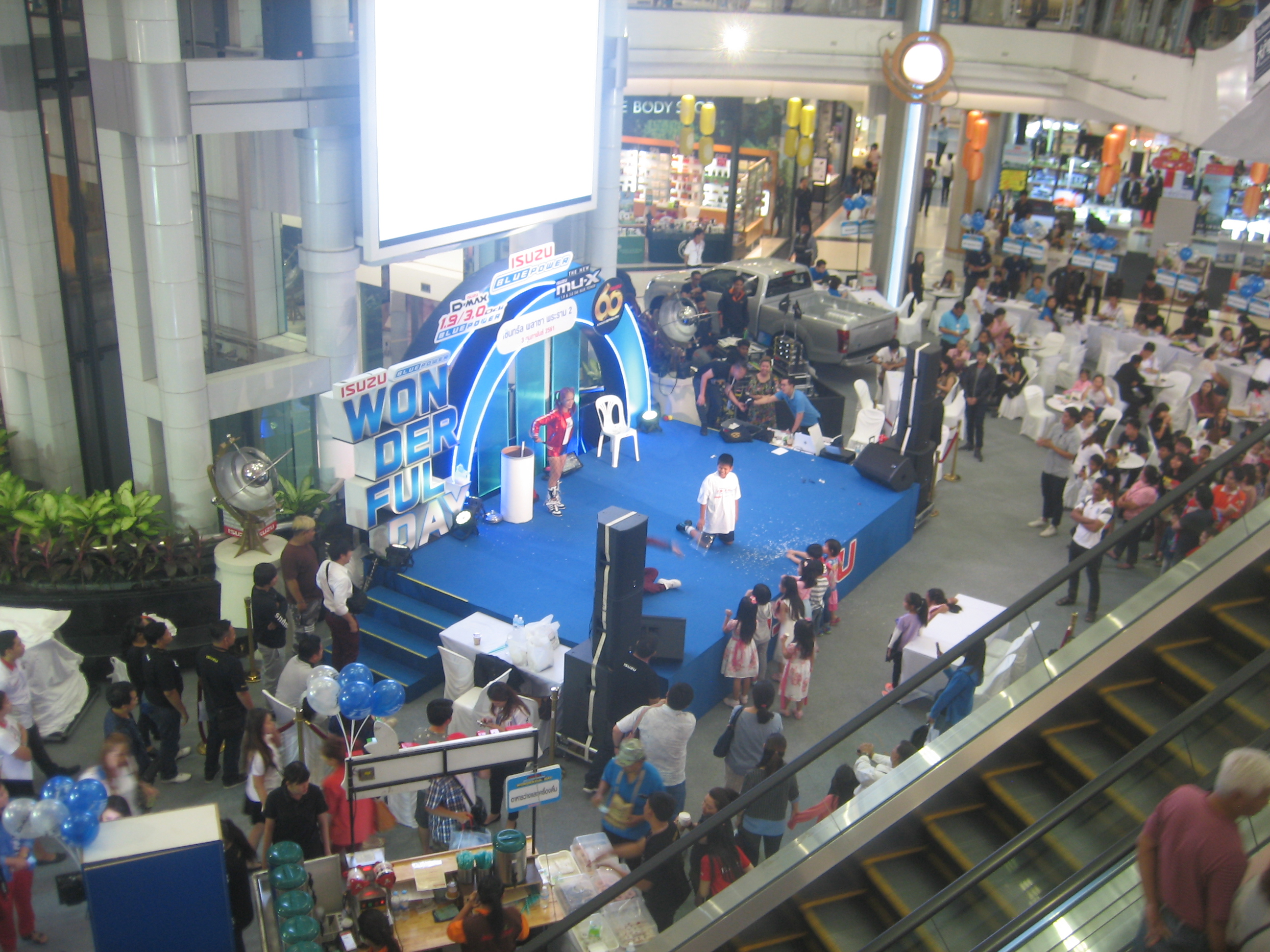
- CentralPlaza Rama II interior

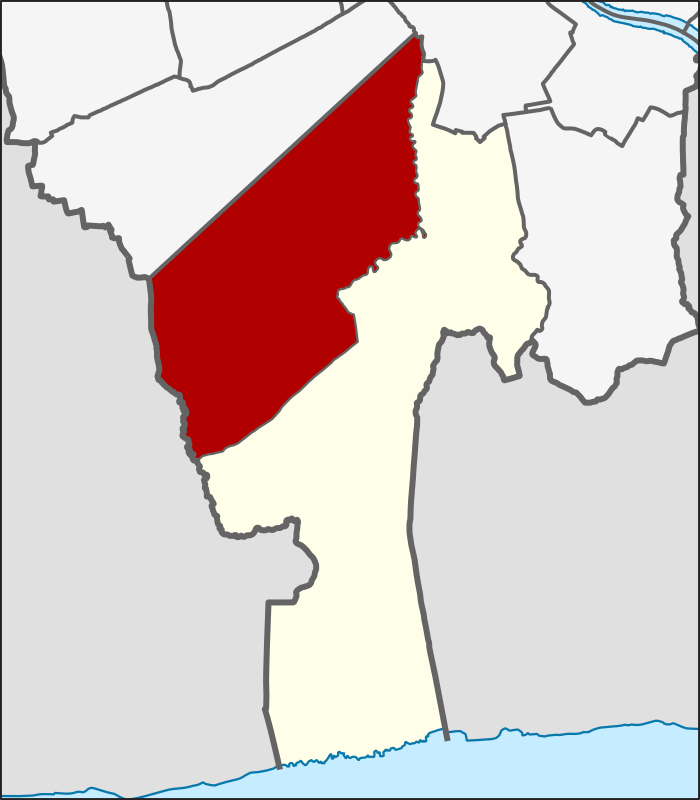
- Location in Bang Khun Thian District
- Country: Thailand
- Province: Bangkok
- Khet: Bang Khun Thian

Area
  - Total: 35.975 km^{2} (13.890 sq mi)

Population (2020)
  - Total: 125,133
- Time zone: UTC+7 (ICT)
- Postal code: 10150
- TIS 1099: 102107

Samae Dam (Thai: แสมดำ, pronounced [sā.mɛ̌ː dām]) is a khwaeng (sub-district) of Bang Khun Thian District, Bangkok.

== History ==
Samae Dam is an area where Mon people lived since the reign of King Nangklao (Rama III) during the early Rattanakosin. With most of them immigrated from Mahachai or Samut Sakhon, and settled along the Khlong Sunak Hon, a canal excavated during the reign of King Nangklao to the Mahachai quarter.

The name "Samae Dam" means Indian mangrove (Avicennia officinalis), a species of mangrove that was burned to make charcoal which is the original occupation of locals. The scenes of the burning of mangrove charcoal were mentioned in Nirat Mueang Phet, a travelogue of the renowned poet Sunthon Phu in 1854.

Nowadays, Bang Kradi quarter in Samae Dam is well known for being a Mon settlement as well as a cultural tourism destination.

== Geography ==
Samae Dam is a northern part of the district, with a total area of 35.975 km^{2} (13.890 mi^{2}). Samae Dam is an urban area.

It is bounded by other sub-districts (from north clockwise): Bang Bon Tai, Khlong Bang Bon in Bang Bon District, Bang Khun Thian, Chom Thong in Chom Thong District, Tha Kham in its district (Maeklong Railway, Khlong Wat Sing and Khlong Sanam Chai are borderlines), Tha Kham in its district (Khlong Sanam Chai is a borderline), Tha Kham in its district (Khlong Sanam Chai, Khlong Phraya Chaiyot Sombat, Lamrang Ta Nen are the borderlines), Phan Thai Norasing and Bang Nam Chuet in Mueang Samut Sakhon District of Samut Sakhon Province (Khlong Samae Dam Nuea and Khlong Samae Dam Tai are the borderlines), respectively.

== Population ==
In the 2018 it has the entire population 124,916 people.

== Transportation ==
Samae Dam is easily accessible via Rama II Road (Highway 35). The area served by many bus lines of the Bangkok Mass Transit Authority (BMTA), such as 68, 76, 105, 140, 142, 147, 720 etc.

Samae Dam also served by the Kan Kheha, Rang Sakae, Rang Pho, Sam Yaek, and Phrom Daen Railway Halts of the State Railway of Thailand (SRT), whose Maeklong Railway runs through the area.

== Places ==
- Bang Khun Thian District Office
- Bang Khun Thian Market
- CentralPlaza Rama II
- Big C Rama II
- Tesco Lotus Rama II
- Nakornthon Hospital
- Thon Buri Community Housing
- Chao Mae Ngu Chong Ang and Son Shrine
- Wat Kamphaeng
- Wat Bang Kradi
- Wat Sakae Ngam
- Wat Samae Dam
- Mon Art and Cultural Centre of Bang Kradi
