= UEF =

UEF may refer to:

- Underwater Explorers' Federation, a Hungarian diver certification organization
- Unified Emulator Format
- Uniform energy factor for water heaters
- Union of European Federalists
- United Earth Federation, one of the fictional factions of the video game Supreme Commander
- University of Eastern Finland
- Ho Chi Minh City University of Economics and Finance
