= Ho Chi Minh City University of Economics and Finance =

Ho Chi Minh City University of Economics and Finance (UEF)
- Motto: Quality, Efficiency, Integration
- Type: Private
- Established: 24 September 2007
- Location: 141-145 (with 161), Điện Biên Phủ Boulevard, Gia Định, Ho Chi Minh City, Vietnam
- Campus: Urban
- Website: www.uef.edu.vn

The Ho Chi Minh City University of Economics and Finance (UEF) is a Vietnamese private university based in Ho Chi Minh City, Vietnam. The headquarter and its branch are both located nearby on Điện Biên Phủ Boulevard, Gia Định ward.

== Facilities ==
Ho Chi Minh City University of Economics and Finance is located near the center of town (5 minutes drive to the Central Business District). It has modern equipment in a tower of 26 storeys with 3 basements.

- Classrooms fully equipped with air-conditioning, computers, projectors and Wifi
- Information Technology classrooms with individual desktops for each student
- A library with all the books the students need for their studies
- A Self-studying and social area for students to relax in their free time
- A fitness center with coach Ly Duc (2002 Asian Games Bodybuilding Champion)

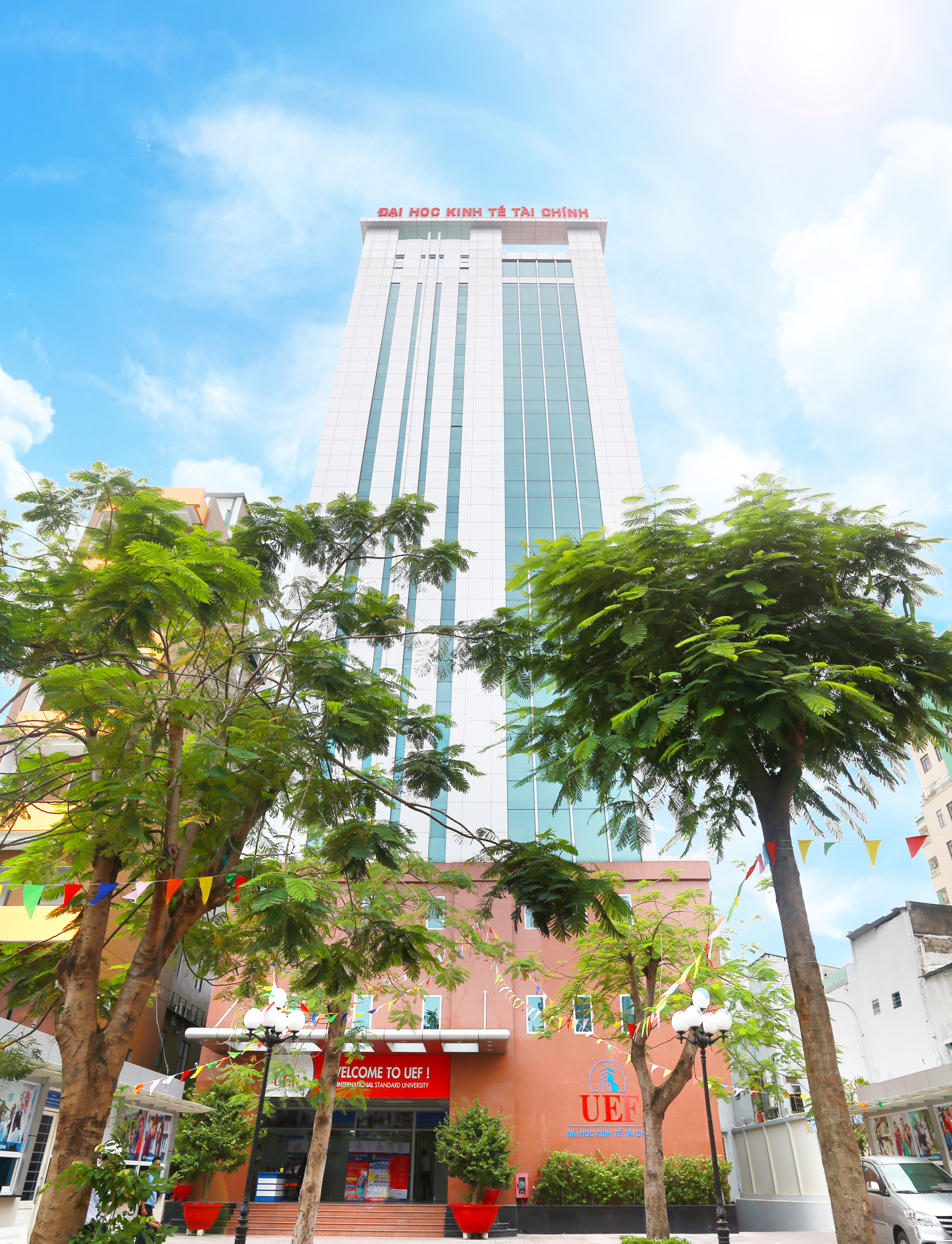
The 276 Điện Biên Phủ Building, formerly used by UEF until November 2025

== Academic programs ==
The curricula provided at the UEF are relevant to modern day business life. The teaching methods focus on student interaction, teamwork, discussions and presentations. Other than that, students are brought to cultivate problem solving and creative thinking skills. And to be sure all the students acquire the skills taught, the classes are designed to accommodate no more than 30 students.

=== Business Administration ===
- General Management
- Small and Medium-sized Enterprises Management
- Entrepreneurship
- Logistics Management

=== International Business ===
- International Management
- Foreign Trade

=== Marketing ===
- Marketing Management
- Branding
- Advertising

=== Business Law ===
- International Commerce Law
- Business Law
- Law of Finance and Banking

=== E-Commerce ===
- Online business
- Online Marketing

=== Finance and Banking ===
- Banking
- Business Finance
- Public Finance
- Investment Finance

=== Accounting ===
- Accounting
- Business Accounting

=== Information Technology ===
- IT Security
- Web technologies
- Software
- Networking

=== English ===
- Business English
- English Translation
- Academic English

=== Public Relations ===
- Event Management and Coordination
- News Media

=== Hospitality Management ===
- Hospitality Management
- Hospitality and Tourism Management
- Hospitality and Restaurant Management

== International exchange programs ==
The Ho Chi Minh City University of Economics and Finance has partnerships with the University of Pittsburgh (USA) and the university of Bangkok (Thailand).

== Internships and employment for students ==
Alongside with the Academic process, the UEF keeps strong ties with the business world. In that matter, students are offered internship and professional opportunities at UEF's partner companies in sectors such as banking (Sacombank, HSBC, Vietcombank, ANZ), retail (Nguyen Kim, AEON) or corporate services (KPMG).
