= Bang Bon Tai =

Bang Bon Tai บางบอนใต้
- Khwaeng
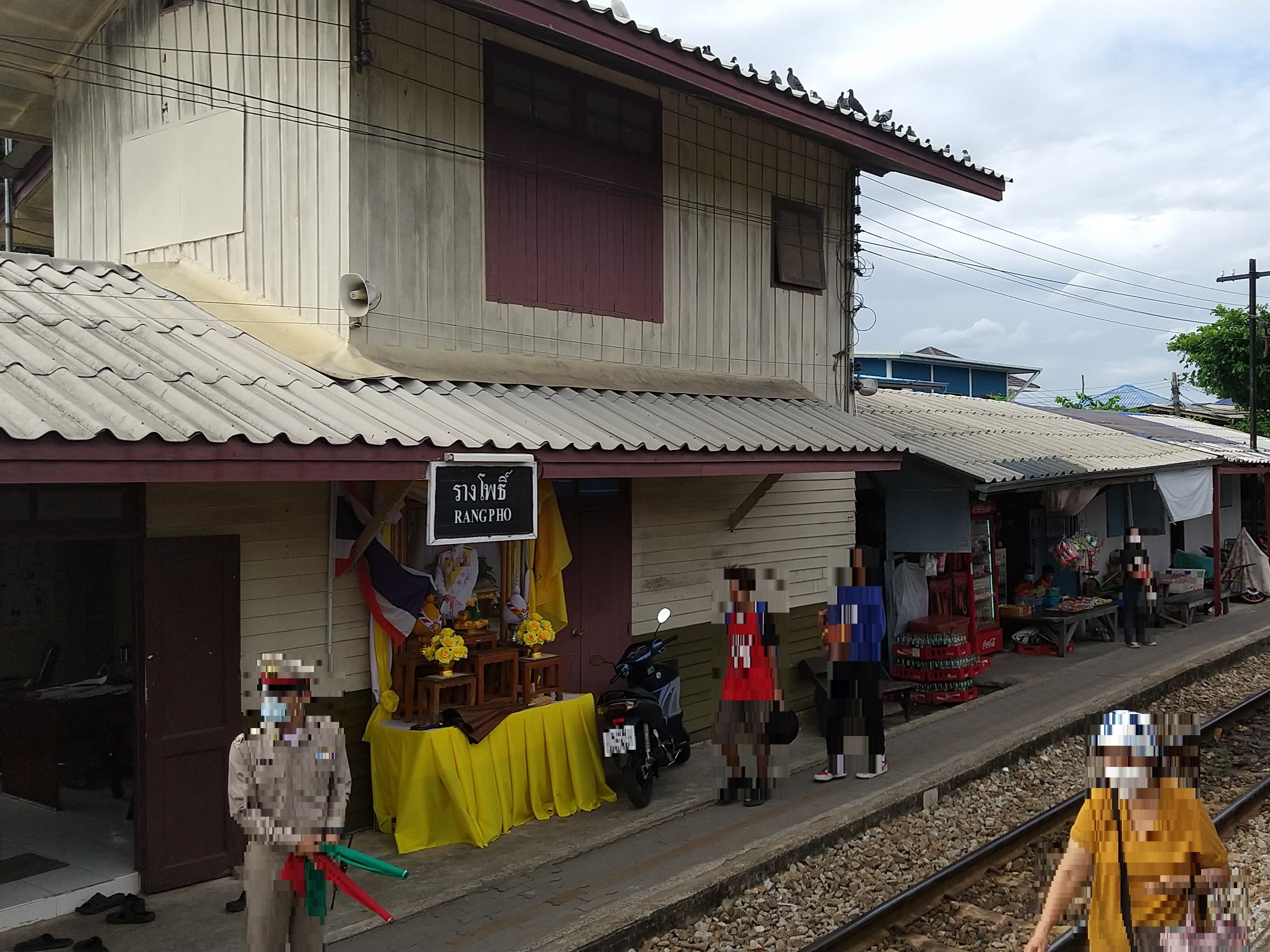
- Rang Pho railway station in early 2023

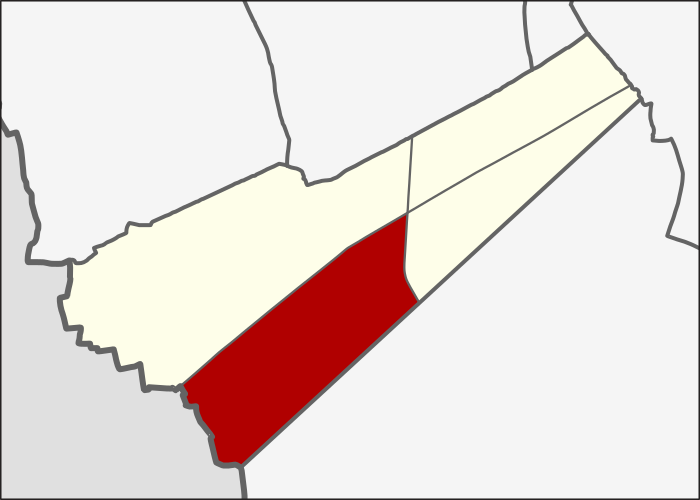
- Location in Bang Bon District
- Coordinates: 13°38′20.7″N 100°23′53.0″E
- Country: Thailand
- Province: Bangkok
- Khet: Bang Bon

Area
  - Total: 8.939 km^{2} (3.451 sq mi)

Population (2020)
  - Total: 24,860
- Time zone: UTC+7 (ICT)
- Postal code: 10150
- TIS 1099: 105003

Bang Bon Tai (Thai: บางบอนใต้, pronounced [bāːŋ bɔ̄ːn tâːj]) is a khwaeng (subdistrict) of Bang Bon District, in Bangkok, Thailand. It was one of the thirteen newly established khwaeng announced on the 26th of July 2017.

In 2020, it had a total population of 24,860 people.

== Transportation ==
=== Rail ===
Bang Bon Tai is connected with Maha Chai (downtown Samut Sakhon) by the Maeklong Railway of the State Railway of Thailand (SRT). Bang Bon, Kan Kheha, Rang Sakae (defunct), Rang Pho, Sam Yaek and Phromdaen are the stations of the area. They were all located on the border with their neighbouring Samae Dam of Bang Khun Thian District.

=== Road ===
Bang Bon Tai is connected to Maha Chai by Ekkachai Road (Highway 3242). Kanchanaphisek Road (Outer Ring Road) also passes the area.
