= Thin Doem Khun Kala =

Coordinates: 13.626761°N 100.448645°E

Thin Doem Khun Kala (Thai: ถิ่นเดิมคุณกะลา, pronounced [tʰìn dɤ̄ːm kʰūn kā.lāː]) is a group of many little islands at Khlong Chaloem Chai Phatthana in Bangkok, Thailand. This area of Bang Khun Thian District was constructed to be a relaxing place and a tourist attraction. There are mangrove forests and about 400 macaque monkeys and a way along the canal to walk to Sanam Chai Park for go to the Khun Kala waterside market for relaxing and buy the local product after watching the macaque monkeys. There is also a monument of Khun Kala to recall the history and speech of king.

== History ==
Thin Doem in Thai means the place that lives for a long time and Khun Kala means macaque monkeys. The two words together mean the place that has macaque monkeys living for a long time. Khun Kala were a pair of macaque monkeys that hurt their hands because they use their hands to dip into coconuts and could not take their hands out until the hands rotted. Each macaque monkey received the grace from King Bhumibol and was treated by a veterinary.
