= Bang Bon district =

Bang Bon บางบอน
- Khet
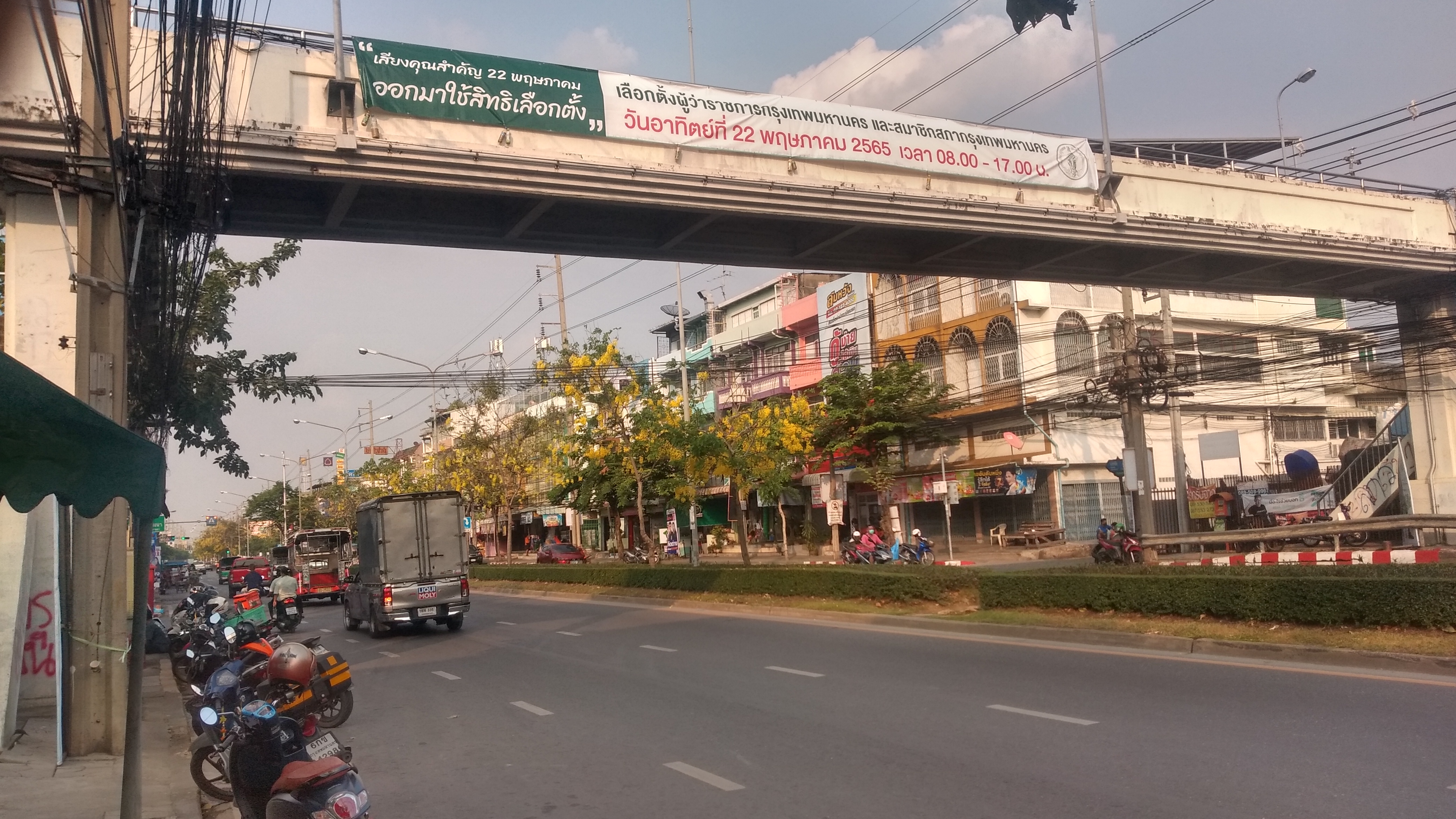
- Ekkachai Road (Highway 3242), Bang Bon, April 2022
- Etymology: A Place of Elephant Ears
- Khet location in Bangkok
- Coordinates: 13°39′50″N 100°24′32″E
- Country: Thailand
- Province: Bangkok
- Seat: Bang Bon Tai
- Khwaeng: 4
- Khet established: 6 March 1998

Area
  - Total: 34.745 km^{2} (13.415 sq mi)

Population (2017)
  - Total: 107,118
  - Density: 3,082.97/km^{2} (7,984.9/sq mi)
- Time zone: UTC+7 (ICT)
- Postal code: 10150
- Geocode: 1050
- Website: www.bangkok.go.th/bangbon

Bang Bon (Thai: บางบอน, pronounced [bāːŋ bɔ̄ːn]) is one of the 50 districts (khet) of Bangkok, Thailand. Its neighbours, clockwise from north, are Bang Khae, Phasi Charoen, Chom Thong, and Bang Khun Thian districts of Bangkok, Mueang Samut Sakhon district and Krathum Baen district of Samut Sakhon province, and Nong Khaem district of Bangkok.

== History ==
Formerly Bang Bon was a tambon of amphoe Bang Khun Thian in Thonburi Province, prior to the merger of Thonburi and Phra Nakhon into a single province, after which it was a sub-district of Bang Khun Thian District.

On 14 October 1997, Bang Bon was split from Bang Khun Thian and established as a new district. The district office opened on 6 March 1998, the last of Bangkok's 50 districts to open, first established temporarily at the Thepyada Arak Fresh Market building, but later moved to a permanent location on Ekkachai Road.

The name Bang Bon is reference to a type of herbaceous in taro family called bon (บอน, pronounced [bɔ̄ːn]) in Thai, also known internationally as elephant ears (Colocasia esculenta var. aquatilis). Bang Bon is therefore "a place of elephant ears".

== Administration ==
The district has four sub-districts (khwaeng).

No.	Name	Thai	Area (km^{2})	Map
2.	Bang Bon Nuea	บางบอนเหนือ	15.203	Map
3.	Bang Bon Tai	บางบอนใต้	8.939	Map
4.	Khlong Bang Phran	คลองบางพราน	5.423	Map
5.	Khlong Bang Bon	คลองบางบอน	5.180	Map
Total			34.745	Map

The missing number 1 is the sub-district that was dissolved and divided into four current sub-districts.

== Economy ==
Agriculture is an important part of the area economy. Among Bang Bon's famous products are Nam Doc Mai mangos, coconuts, orchids, and lotus.

== Places ==
- Wat Bang Bon
- 7th Cycle Birthday Anniversary Park, Bang Bon, otherwise known as 9 Hills Park
- Sarasas Witaed Bangbon School
- Suksanareewittaya School, formerly and still colloquially known as Suksanari 2 School (shared with Samut Sakhon province)

== Local politics ==
In Bangkok politics, Bang Bon, along with the neighboring districts of Bang Khun Thian, Chom Thong, and Nong Khaem, has long been regarded as a political stronghold of two prominent political families, the Muangsiri family and the Yubamrung family. The Muangsiri family's political influence began with Plio Muangsiri, a local headman in the Bang Khun Thian area before Bang Bon was established as a separate district in 1997. He was first elected to the House of Representatives in 1979 and was subsequently succeeded by his younger brother, as well as their children and grandchildren. As of 2026, five members of the Muangsiri family have served as Members of Parliament, making it the Bangkok political family with the largest number of MPs. This figure does not include its members who have served on the Bangkok Metropolitan Council (BMC). Over the years, family members have represented several political parties, including the Thai Citizens' Party, Thai Rak Thai, the People's Power Party, the Democrat Party, and Pheu Thai.

The Yubamrung family's political leader is Chalerm Yubamrung, a former officer of the Crime Suppression Division who entered national politics in the early 1980s. He was first elected as an MP for the area in 1983 under the Democrat Party before joining the Mass Party, a small but locally influential party that enjoyed strong support in the constituency during the 1980s and the first half of the 1990s. As the party declined, Chalerm and his three sons later joined several other parties, including the New Aspiration Party, the People's Power Party, Pheu Thai, and Palang Pracharath. In recent years, as Chalerm has gradually reduced his political role, much of the family's influence has been passed on to his second son Wan Yubamrung (formerly known as Wanchalerm Yubamrung). Meanwhile, Chalerm's younger brother, Nawarat Yubamrung, has represented Nong Khaem as a BMC member for more than 20 years, serving seven consecutive terms. In the 2026 Bangkok Metropolitan Council election, held alongside the Bangkok gubernatorial election, Nawarat successfully retained his seat as an independent candidate.

Despite the continued local influence of these long-established political families, the area's parliamentary representation has shifted in recent years. In both the 2023 and 2026 general elections, the constituency elected candidates from the Move Forward Party and its successor, the People's Party, including prominent first-term MPs such as Rukchanok Srinork and Nattacha Boonchaiinsawat.
