= Tha Kham, Bangkok =

Coordinates: 13°29′51″N 100°27′15″E

Tha Kham ท่าข้าม
- Khwaeng
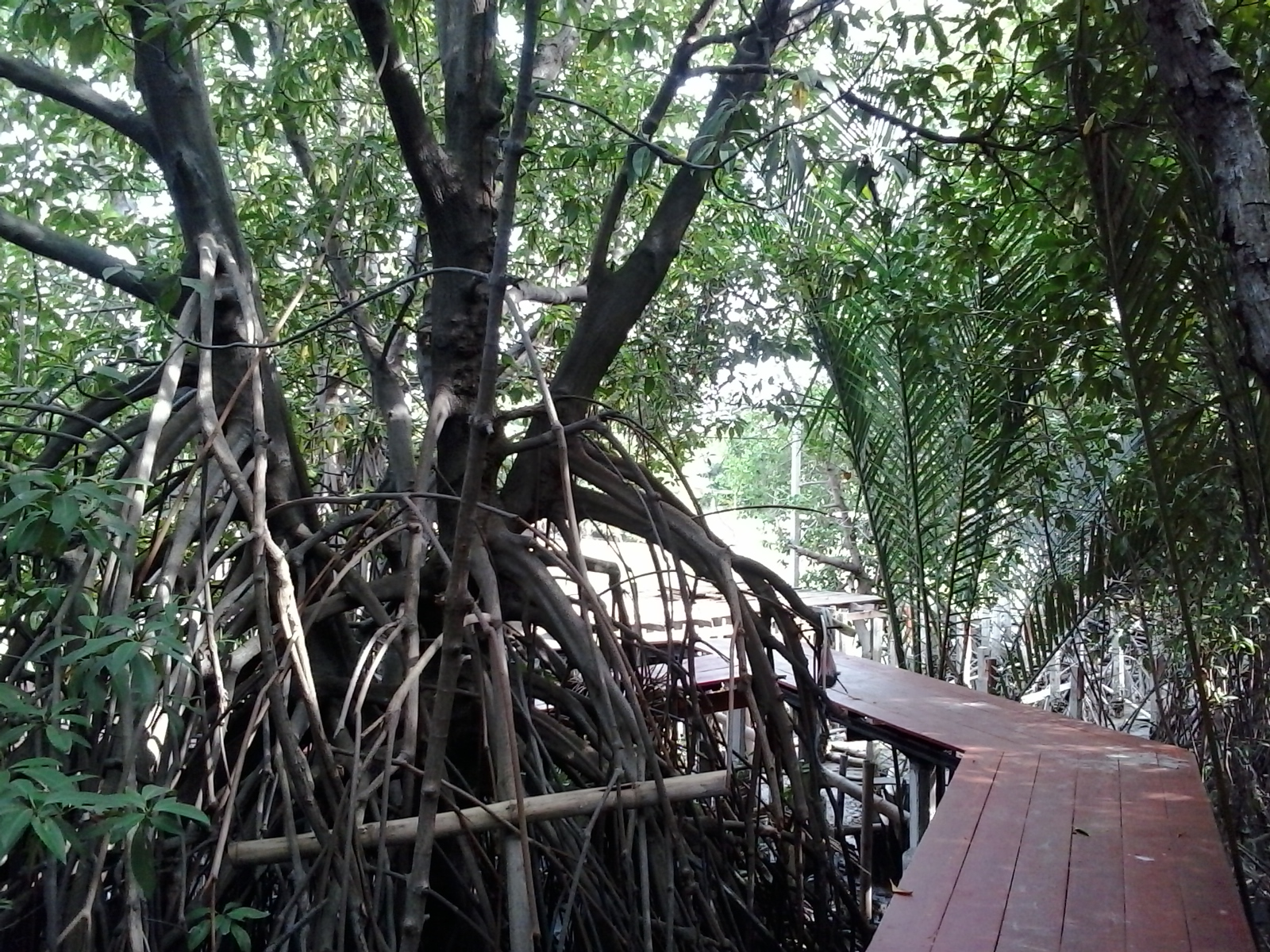
- Mangrove trees at Thian Thale, Tha Kham

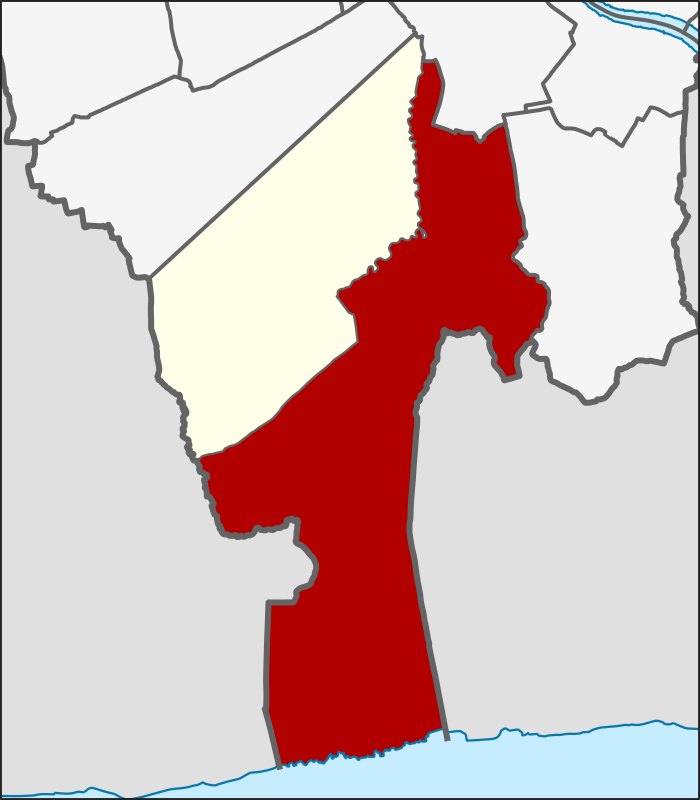
- Location in Bang Khun Thian District
- Country: Thailand
- Province: Bangkok
- Khet: Bang Khun Thian

Area
  - Total: 84.712 km^{2} (32.707 sq mi)

Population (2020)
  - Total: 61,011
- Time zone: UTC+7 (ICT)
- Postal code: 10150
- TIS 1099: 102105

Tha Kham (Thai: ท่าข้าม, pronounced [tʰâː kʰâːm]) is a khwaeng (subdistrict) in Bang Khun Thian District, Bangkok.

== History ==
The name "Tha Kham" literally means "crossing pier", refers to "crossing khlong (canal) pier". It was once the most busy crossover point for masses of kwian (two-wheeled cart drawn by water buffalos) to converge and gather before crossing over Khlong Dan, also known as Khlong Sanam Chai to the other side. Hence the name.

Tha Kham and Bang Khun Thian area is a settlement of the Mon people since the Ayutthaya period. The great evacuation of the Mons from Samut Songkhram took place during the reigns of King Rama III and Rama IV in the early Rattanakosin period.

The traditional occupation of locals is rice farming, including fruit orchards, with a network of canals was dug for communications, irrigation and flood control. Although the rice farming profession has now disappeared from the area. But in the sermon hall of Wat Tha Kham temple, which is more than 160 years old, there are also murals on the ceiling of the hall, reflecting the rice farming and dressing of the Mons in the past.

== Geography ==
Tha Kham is the southern part of the district, with total area of 84.712 km^{2} (32.707 mi^{2}), considered as the largest sub-district of Bangkok and is also the only area that is adjacent to the sea. The coastline is about 4.7 km (2 mi) long, and this muddy landscape is home to mangrove forests, which are the only mangrove forests in Bangkok.

These mangrove trees serve a vital purpose in protecting the environment and have several functions. In addition, the mangrove forests in Tha Kham are also habitat to the last troop of long-tailed macaques (Macaca fascicularis) and the last group of smooth-coated otters (Lutrogale perspicillata) in Bangkok.

Its terrain is a narrow strip of land between the provinces of Samut Prakan and Samut Sakhon.

The area is bounded by other places (from north clockwise): Samae Dam in its district, Bang Mot and Thung Khru in Thung Khru District, Khlong Khun Racha Pinitjai in Na Kluea, Ban Khlong Suan and Laem Fa Pha of Phra Samut Chedi District in Samut Prakan Province, Bay of Bangkok (upper Gulf of Thailand), and Khlong Bang Sao Thong in Phan Thai Norasing of Mueang Samut Sakhon District in Samut Sakhon Province, respectively.

Tha Kham is also filled with seafood restaurants and fish ponds, especially on both sides of Bang Khun Thian Chai Thale Road (Bang Khun Thian Coastal Road).

== Environmental issues ==
Tha Kham experiences seawater eroding the coast an average of 30 meters (98 ft) a year, as well as a risk from the industrial waste discharged from the factories in the vicinities.

== Population ==
In the year 2018, it had a population of 58,962 people. Most of residents engaged in vegetable and fruit farming as well as fish, shrimp, crab and cockle farming.

== Important places ==
- Wat Tha Kham
- Wat Hua Krabue
- Pittayalongkorn Pittayakhom School
- Bang Khun Thien Museum
- Taweethapisak Bangkhunthian School
- Bang Khun Thian Geriatric Hospital
- Thin Doem Khun Kala (macaque scenic viewpoint)
- Prince Chumphon Shrine
- Guanyin Shrine
- Brahminy Kite Scenic Viewpoint (only brahminy kite scenic viewpoint in Bangkok and central region)
- Thian Thale Phatthana Phrueksa Phirom Park
- 28th Milestone of Bangkok & 29th Milestone of Bangkok (only two Bangkok boundary markers are in the sea)
