= Mike Lam =

Hong Kong businessman

- 林景楠
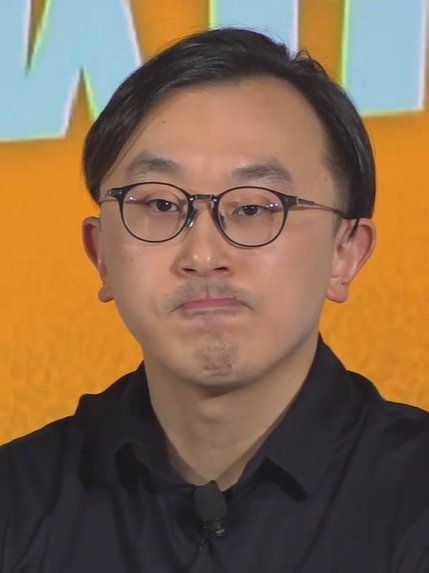
- Lam in 2020
- Born: 5 October 1988 (age 37); Hong Kong
- Known for: Founder of AbouThai; Hong Kong 47
- Spouse: Bowie Kanokwon (m. 2015)
- Children: 2 daughters 1 son
- Website: Mike Lam on Facebook

Mike Lam King-nam (Chinese: 林景楠; born 5 October 1988) is a Hong Kong businessman who founded the retail chain AbouThai. Previously known for a pro-democracy background, Lam was arrested for subversion in the case of Hong Kong 47, and testified for the prosecution against fellow defendants.

== Business career ==
In February 2015, Lam, then a customs officer, spoke against the government's "multiple-entry" Individual Visit Endorsements that permits Shenzhen residents to enter Hong Kong easier during a protest. He was then doxed by radical supporters of the government, and subsequently sacked. Lam then rented a small unit in Kowloon City and started his Thai groceries business with his wife, which would then known as AbouThai (阿布泰國生活百貨, or 阿布泰 in short), meaning "About Thai".

Because of Lam's pro-democracy stance, AbuThai was considered to be a part of yellow economic circle, a loose business coalition that was backed by opposition protestors, especially after the 2019 large scale protest. The chain was targeted by law enforcement officers, criticised by supporters to be biased.

Following the outbreak of COVID-19 and the spread to Hong Kong in January 2020, AbouThai imported medical masks from Thailand reserved for hospital staff and officers for border control, winning support from the medical workers but accused by pro-Beijing camp of bribery. Amidst the worsening pandemic and widespread anxiety fighting for masks, AbuThai sold masks at a low price which attracted long queues.

On 23 August 2023, Lam sold his retail chain to TCC Group of Thailand, with branding changed to Big C.

== Political career ==
In March 2020, Lam announced his intention to run in 2020 legislative election for the Import and Export constituency, but in June decided to run in New Territories East constituency instead, and joined the pro-democracy primaries despite late sign-up.

After losing in the primaries, Lam decided to run in Import and Export constituency instead.

=== Hong Kong 47 ===
I have been comforting my family for several days. The most important thing is that I did nothing wrong and I did nothing illegal, so even if I will be prosecuted or imprisoned, in the end, my conscience is clear.

— Mike Lam, before anticipated indictment in February 2021

On 6 January 2021, Mike Lam was arrested by the national security police for subversion over his participation in the primaries. He was formally charged in late February along with others and was one of the four released on court bail after prosecution dropped appeal.

Lam did not appear much in public after the release, but wrote on social media in August 2022 after General Secretary of the Chinese Communist Party Xi Jinping visited the city, and quoted Xi to implement "One country, two systems" and "Patriots administering Hong Kong" principles, while avoiding Hong Kong independence sentiments. He further wrote in January 2023 that Hong Kong is a city with rule of law, along with a picture with Financial Secretary Paul Chan.

Lam pleaded guilty to the charge in January 2023, and was later revealed to be testifying for the prosecution. The decision has angered some of the remanded democrats which called for boycotting AbouThai, while some in the yellow economic circle decided to cut ties. Five people, including two minors, were arrested after allegedly harassing customers and demanding to meet Mike Lam after news of his decision to be prosecution witness emerged. Lam declared in March that his grocery chain has severed ties with the yellow economic circle, describing the movement as "wrong" while echoing the authorities.

== Personal life ==
Lam married his Thai wife Bowie Kanokwon in 2015. The couple has two daughters, Cantonese names of which are homophones of "freedom" and "conscience".
