= Rukchanok Srinork =

Thai politician (born 1994)

- รักชนก ศรีนอก
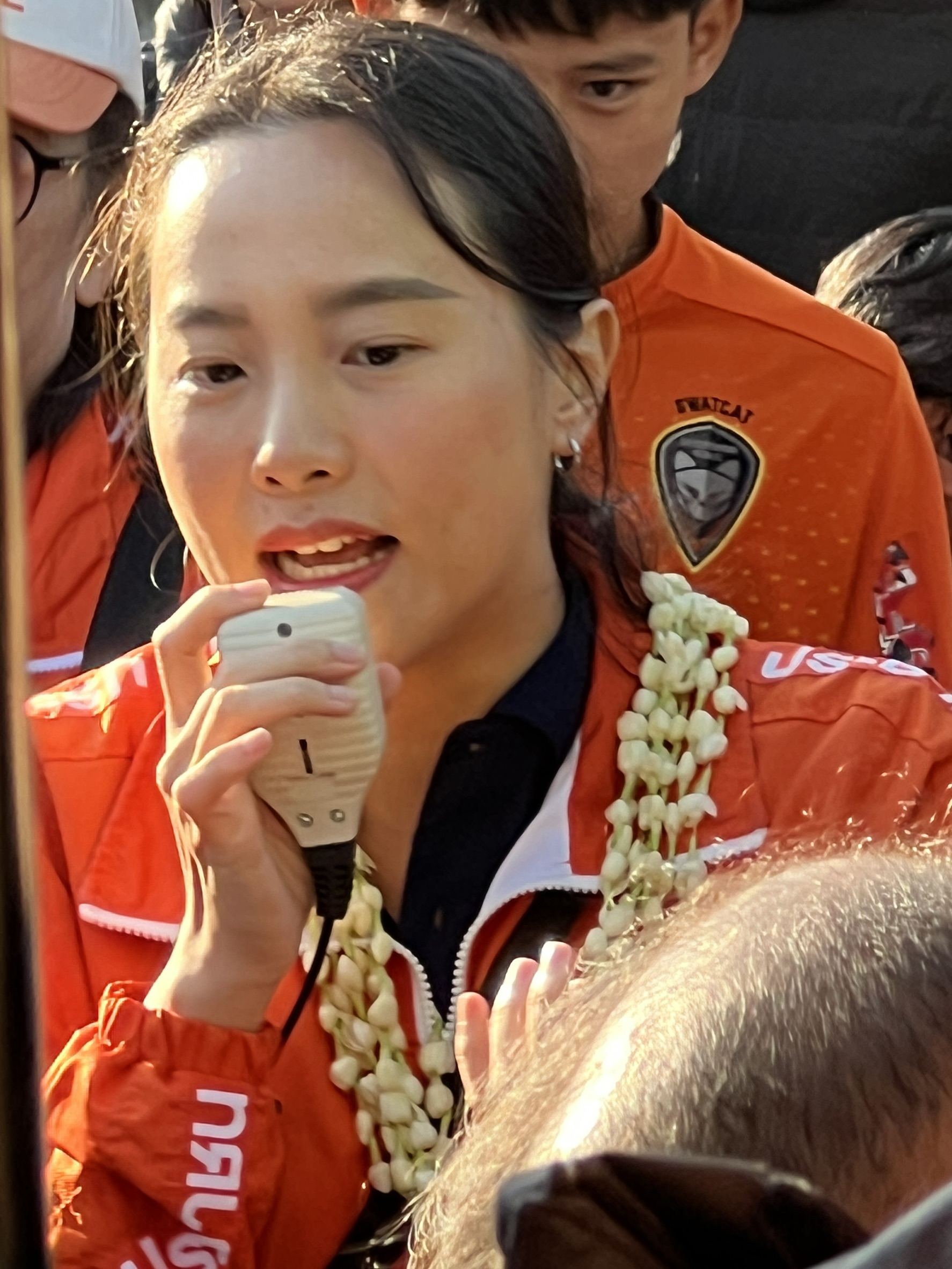
- Rakchanok in 2025 at Maejo Market, Chiang Mai

Member of the House of Representatives
- Incumbent
- Assumed office 14 May 2023
- Constituency: Bangkok–28 (Bang Bon, Chom Thong, Nong Khaem); Party-list (2026–present)

Personal details
- Born: 11 October 1994 (age 31) Talat Phlu, Bangkok, Thailand
- Party: People's (2024–present)
- Other political affiliations: Move Forward (2022–2024)
- Education: Thammasat University
- Occupation: Politician
- Nickname: Ice

Rukchanok Srinork (Thai: รักชนก ศรีนอก; born 11 October 1994), nicknamed Ice, is a Thai politician and former member of the House of Representatives for Bangkok constituencies. She was elected as a constituency House of Representatives representing the Move Forward Party, and later became affiliated with the People’s Party. She is known for her work on the scrutiny and oversight of the national budget, as well as for her public commentary on contemporary social and political issues in Thailand.

== Early life, education, and career ==
Rukchanok Srinork was born on 11 October 1994 in Talat Phlu, Bangkok. She grew up in an incomplete family; the person who raised her was not actually her biological mother, a fact she only discovered when she grew older. She completed her primary school at Wat Khun Chan School and her secondary education at Satri Wat Absornsawan School, an all-girls school in the neighborhood. Rukchanok went on to earn a Bachelor of Science in Statistics from the Faculty of Science and Technology, Thammasat University in 2016.

In 2021, she gained wider public attention through her participation in political and social discussions on the audio-based social media application Clubhouse, where her commentary on contemporary political issues attracted significant public interest.

Before entering formal politics, Rukchanok worked as an online retail entrepreneur, operating an e-commerce business that she began during her first year at university. Between 2019 and 2023, she served as a director of Ha Ngern Pai Dao Ang Karn Co., Ltd., and from 2020 to 2023, she was also a director of Dern Len Bon Dao Ang Karn Co., Ltd. In addition, from 2021 to 2023, she served as an advisor to the Chair of the Committee on Political Development, Communication, and Public Participation in the House of Representatives.

== Political career ==
In the 2023 Thai general election, Rukchanok ran as a Bangkok constituency candidate representing the Move Forward Party. Her principal opponent was Wan Ubumrung of the Pheu Thai Party, who had previously held the seat. Rukchanok won the election. Following the election, media reports cited speculation that the Election Commission of Thailand might delay certification of her result due to complaints filed against her. Rukchanok stated in interviews that the issue was likely related to post-election complaints and affirmed that she would continue engaging with constituents during the review process. The Election Commission subsequently certified all 500 members of the 26th House of Representatives, including Rukchanok.

After certification, she served as a Member of the House of Representatives for a Bangkok constituency from 2023 to 2025. During this period, she was initially affiliated with the Move Forward Party before later joining the People’s Party. She was also appointed 18th Vice-Chair of the Committee on the Consideration of the Annual Budget Expenditure Bill for Fiscal Year 2026.

== Political activities and roles ==
Rukchanok Srinork has served as spokesperson of the Committee on the Study of Budget Preparation and Oversight. Following her certification as a member of the House of Representatives, she played an active role in the scrutiny and oversight of government budgeting, participating in committee work related to both the consideration of the annual budget expenditure bill and the monitoring of public spending by state agencies.

During this period, she became publicly associated with oversight of expenditures by the Social Security Committee, particularly regarding issues of appropriateness and transparency in budget use. These included scrutiny of expenditures such as calendar production and asset procurement by the Social Security Office (Thailand). These issues received significant public attention and were widely reported in Thai media.

In 2025, Rukchanok was ranked “Politician of the Year” in the annual “Best of the Year 2025” public opinion survey conducted by Suan Dusit Poll.

== Legal cases and controversies ==
=== Criminal charges ===
On 13 December 2023, Rukchanok was convicted for retweeting posts in 2020 on X relating to a company owned by Maha Vajiralongkorn and the manufacturing of the COVID-19 vaccine. The charges were three years on a lese majeste charge and three for violation of the Computer Crimes Act. Rukchanok was granted bail for 500,000 baht with the condition that she refrain from activities which could offend the monarchy.

=== Public disputes and verbal harassment in media ===
In late 2025, a social media dispute arose after comments by a public figure referred to Rukchanok Srinork’s family background. The remarks were criticized in the media as demeaning, and Rukchanok responded by stating that while she supported freedom of expression, she opposed the use of language she described as hate speech and the targeting of individuals’ families in political attacks. The National Human Rights Commission of Thailand subsequently issued a statement describing violations of human dignity and sexual harassment as unacceptable and called for relevant authorities to review the matter in accordance with legal procedures.

Rukchanok was later cited as a case study in reports on online harassment and disinformation targeting female politicians, based on analysis of social media content prior to the 2023 general election.
