= Bang Bon Nuea =

Bang Bon Nuea บางบอนเหนือ
- Khwaeng
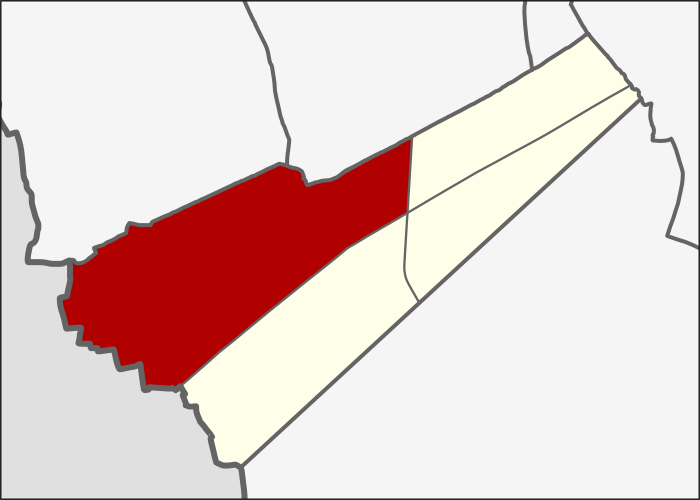
- Location in Bang Bon District
- Country: Thailand
- Province: Bangkok
- Khet: Bang Bon

Area
  - Total: 15.203 km^{2} (5.870 sq mi)

Population (2020)
  - Total: 22,619
- Time zone: UTC+7 (ICT)
- Postal code: 10150
- TIS 1099: 105002

Bang Bon Nuea (Thai: บางบอนเหนือ, pronounced [bāːŋ bɔ̄ːn nɯ̌a̯]) is a khwaeng (subdistrict) of Bang Bon District, in Bangkok, Thailand. In 2020, it had a total population of 22,619 people.
