= Nattacha Boonchaiinsawat =

Thai politician

- ณัฐชา บุญไชยอินสวัสดิ์
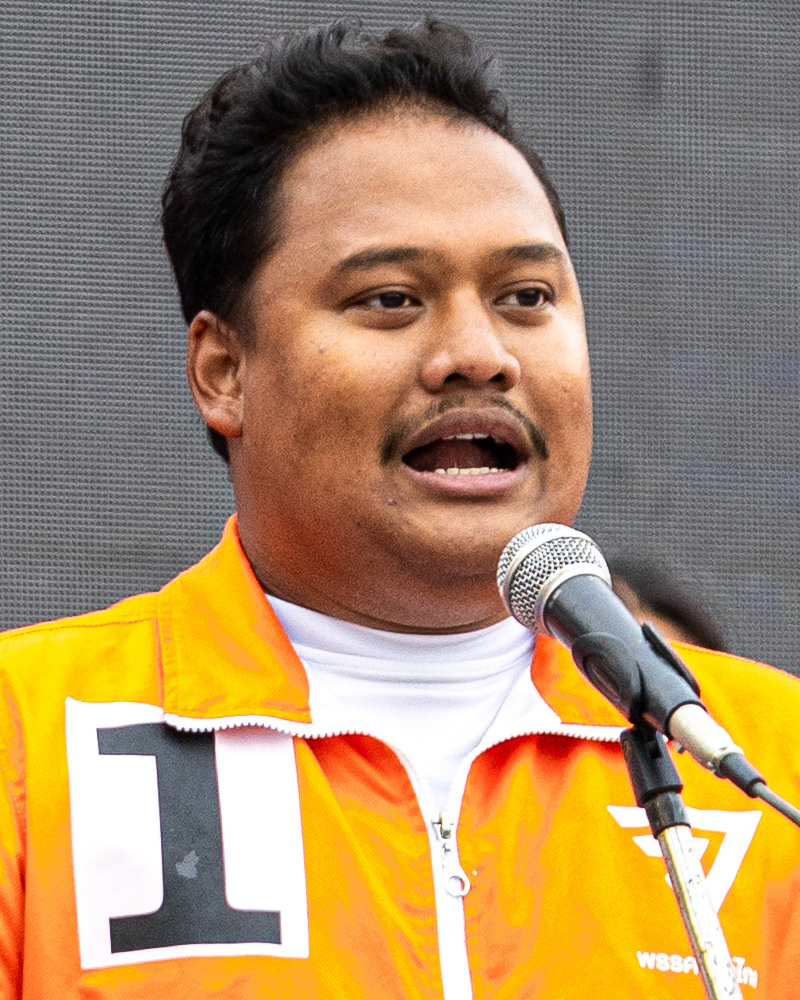

Member of the House of Representatives
- Incumbent
- Assumed office 24 March 2019

Nattacha Boonchaiinsawat (Thai: ณัฐชา บุญไชยอินสวัสดิ์) is a Thai politician and member of the House of Representatives representing Bangkok since 2019. A member of the People's Party, Nattacha oversees the party's election strategy.

== Career ==
Nattacha served as vice chairman of a parliamentary subcommittee investigating the release of invasive blackchin tilapia in Thailand's waterways.
