= Nakornthon Hospital =

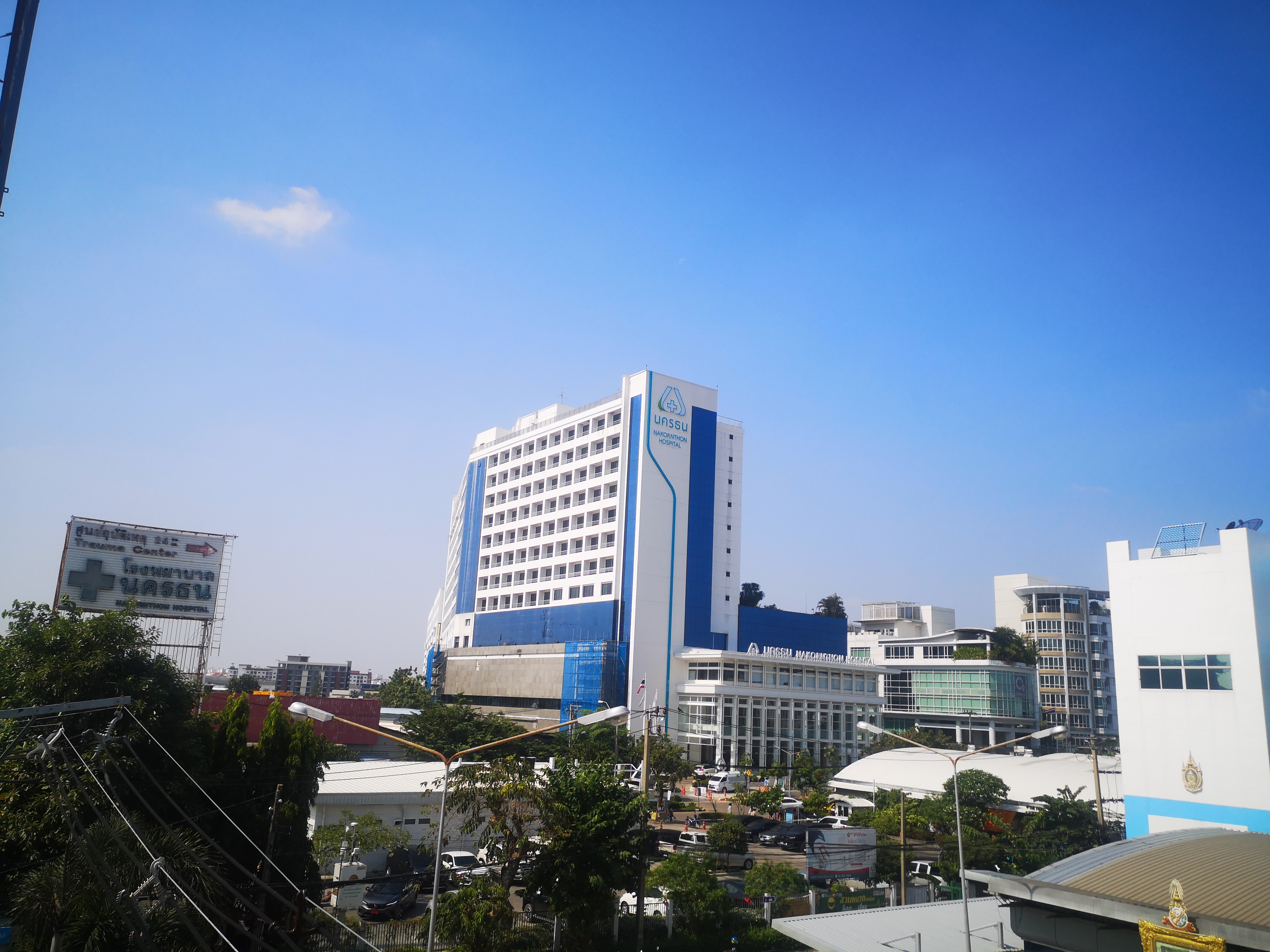

Geography
- Location: 1 Soi RamaII 56, Rama II Road, Samae Dam, Bang Khun Thian, Bangkok 10150, Thailand
- Coordinates: 13.660312°N 100.433339°E

Organisation
- Care system: Private
- Type: General and Specialized

Services
- Standards: Thailand Hospital Accreditation
- Beds: 500 Inpatient Beds

History
- Opened: 1996

Links
- Website: Official website
- Lists: Hospitals in Thailand

Nakornthon Hospital is a hospital located in Bangkok, Thailand. It first opened on November 10, 1996, to provide health care for the local community.

Today the hospital provides medical care through multidisciplinary teams of trained specialists. The hospital operates with a 500-bed capacity and more than 15 specialty centers, and has received the ISO 9001:2000 certification, as well as the Thailand Hospital Accreditation.

The hospital has many specialty centers, including:

- Allergy
- Assisted Reproductive Technology (ART)
- Skin, Cosmetic, and Laser
- Wellness

The hospital has an active community support program including providing mobile medical services, cardiopulmonary resuscitation (CPR) training, and disaster medical aid partnership. Throughout the year, Nakornthon Hospital hosts multiple events to promote health and well-being in the community, including:

- Health Empowerment Program, which provides a series of health seminars free of charge to the community.
- NT Sport Events, which includes a series of competitions among local area businesses to promote health and well-being
- Nakornthon Hospital sponsors the Nakornthon Hospital Marathon in order to promote well-being and community fitness.
