= Khlong Bang Phran =

Khlong Bang Phran คลองบางพราน
- Khwaeng
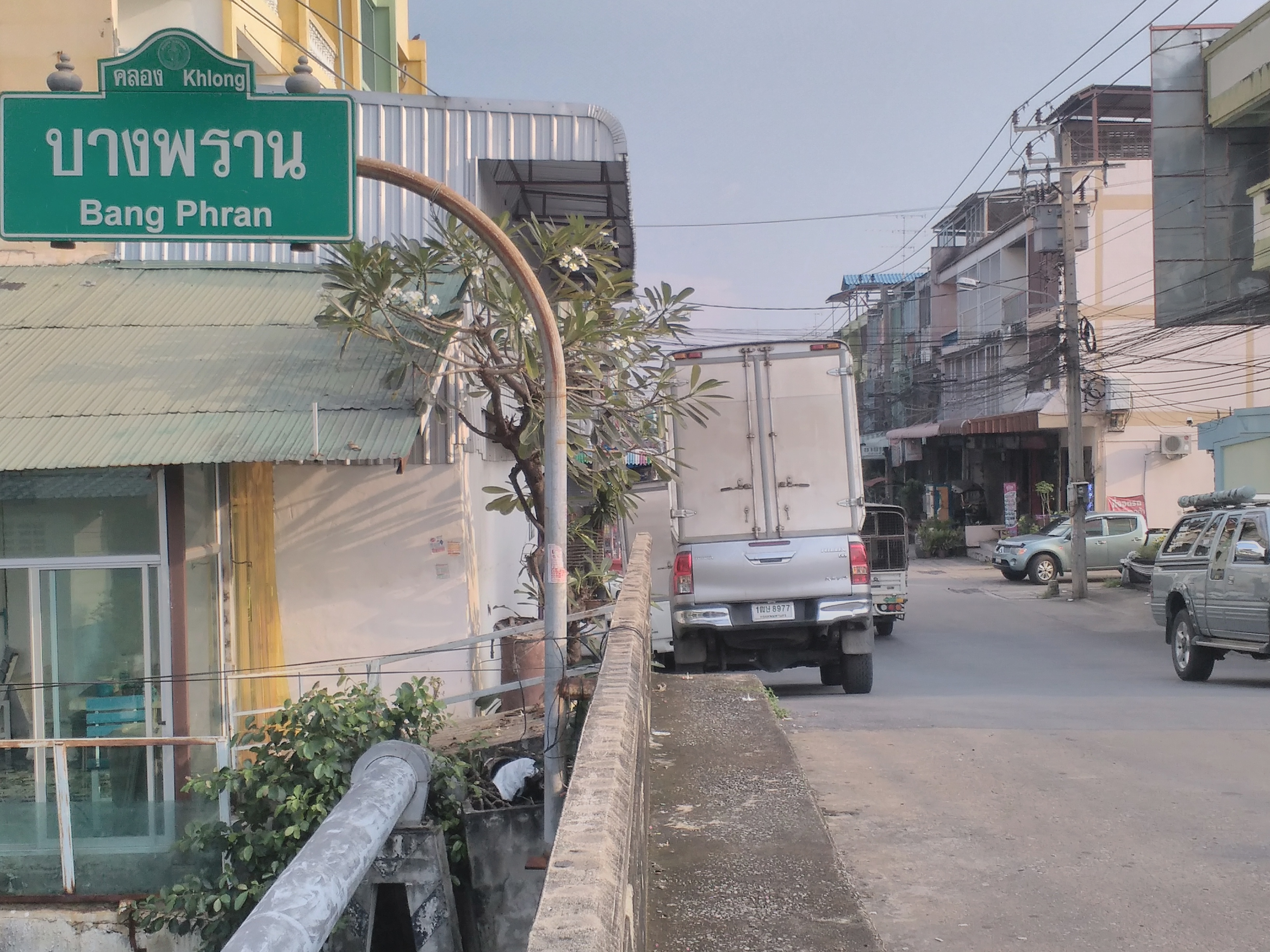
- Khlong Bang Phran

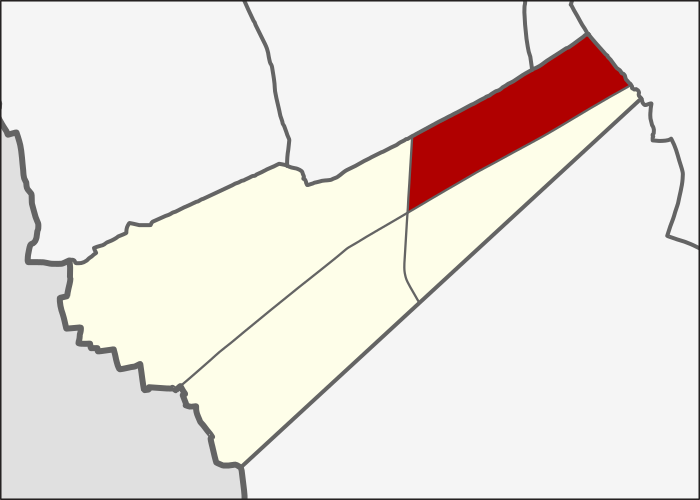
- Location in Bang Bon District
- Country: Thailand
- Province: Bangkok
- Khet: Bang Bon

Area
  - Total: 5.423 km^{2} (2.094 sq mi)

Population (2020)
  - Total: 32,286
- Time zone: UTC+7 (ICT)
- Postal code: 10150
- TIS 1099: 105004

Khlong Bang Phran (Thai: คลองบางพราน, pronounced [kʰlɔ̄ːŋ bāːŋ pʰrāːn]) is a khwaeng (subdistrict) of Bang Bon District, in Bangkok, Thailand. In 2020, it had a total population of 32,286 people.
