= Big C =

Thai retail company

Big C Retail Corporation PLC
- Type: Public
- Industry: Retail
- Founded: 1993; 33 years ago
- Founder: Central Group
- Headquarters: Bangkok, Thailand
- Area served: Thailand, Laos, Cambodia, Vietnam, Hong Kong
- Key people: Aswin Techajareonvikul, President; Charoen Sirivadhanabhakdi, Chairman
- Products: Discount Stores, Grocery Stores, Hypermarkets
- Revenue: 140 billion baht (2018)
- Net income: ▲6,976 million baht (FY2013)
- Number of employees: 27,000
- Parent: TCC Group (Thailand, Laos and Cambodia); Central Group & Nguyen Kim Group (Vietnam)
- Website: bigc.co.th

Big C, operated by Big C Supercenter Public Company Limited under Big C Retail Corporation Public Company Limited, is a grocery and general merchandising retailer headquartered in Bangkok, Thailand. In 2016, Big C was Thailand's second-largest hypermarket operator after Lotus's. It has operations in five countries, namely Thailand, Laos, Cambodia, Vietnam and Hong Kong.

The company was founded by Central Group in 1993 and the first Big C opened on Chaengwattana Road in Bangkok in 1994. As of 2019 Big C operates 153 hypermarkets, 63 Big C markets, and 1,018 Mini Big C stores.

== History ==
=== Beginning ===
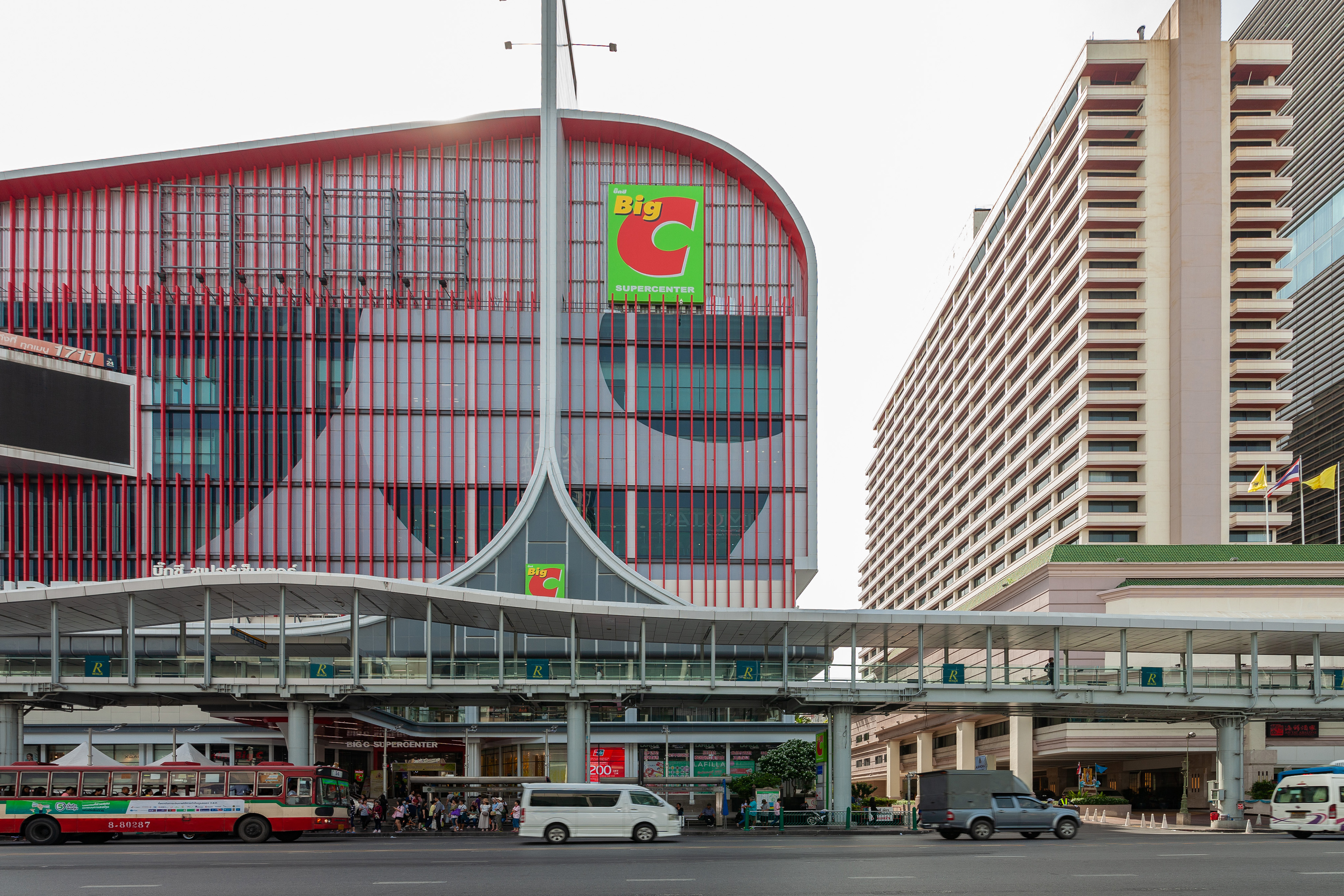
Big C Supercenter Ratchadamri in the Pathum Wan District of Bangkok.

Central Group opened the Central Superstore at the Wong Sawang intersection in 1993 as a Central Department Store subsidiary. It began selling groceries from Central Supermarket and private label clothing from Central Department Store and Central Trading, under the self-service store concept.

The Big C brand was first launched on 15 January 1994, the name being an abbreviation of "Big Central". The name has since been modified to have a different meaning. That of 'Big' meaning 'a large area with various services and facilities for customers and also covers a wide variety of products that Big C selects to sell to meet all customers' needs'; whilst the 'C' means customers who have always supported Big C well'.

The first Big C store was opened on Chaengwattana Road in Bangkok.

=== 1990s ===
Save One Rangsit was rebranded as the Big C Supercenter in 1995, and was the chain's first store outside Bangkok. The same year, Central Superstore Company Limited changed its name to Big C Supercenter Public Company Limited, and was listed on the Stock Exchange of Thailand (SET) (SET: BIGC) with S.K. Garment PLC holding a majority stake.

Big C launched the single floor store concept at Bangphlee in 1996, integrating a super center 12,000 m^{2} floor space and a layout and decor to facilitate shopping. The efficient design contributed to lower operating costs.

=== Merger with Groupe Casino ===
After 1997 Asian financial crisis, Big C Supercenter PCL formed a business alliance with France-based Groupe Casino, known for its Géant stores. Groupe Casino bought 530 million shares of a capital increase in 1999, making them the largest shareholder after the company's recapitalization. After securing the controlling stake in Big C, Groupe Casino sold Big C's garment business in order to concentrate only on retail activity to strengthen the efficiency of the operation.

=== 2000s ===
Big C extended its business hours from 08:00 to midnight daily and launched the Big C website in 2000. Two years later, Big C launched a hard-discount supermarket chain, "Leader Price by Big C", an affiliate store similar to the Leader Price brand of Groupe Casino. In the same year, Big C launched its first credit card, "Big C Credit Card", and "Big C Hire-Purchase". Big C Foundation (Thai: มูลนิธิบิ๊กซี) was also launched in 2002, with its main objectives including providing necessary assistance and support for children in terms of education, and offering opportunities for education to those suffering as a result of social abuses or the drug trade.

Big C developed and expanded the "Compact Store" concept in 2005. Compact Stores each require an investment of between 300 and 400 million baht, and have an average retail space of 5,000-6,000 square metres, whereas Big C's standard stores have retail space of about 10,000 square metres and require an investment of between 600 and 700 million baht. In May 2005, the "Big C Shopper Card" was launched, which was a hire-purchase card.

In 2006, Leader Price by Big C was rebranded as "Mini Big C" (Thai: มินิบิ๊กซี), a proximity store format offering 24-hour service. Big C launched another new brand store format in July 2010 called "Big C Junior" (Thai: บิ๊กซี จูเนียร์), which is sized midway between a compact store and a supermarket.

=== Global branding ===
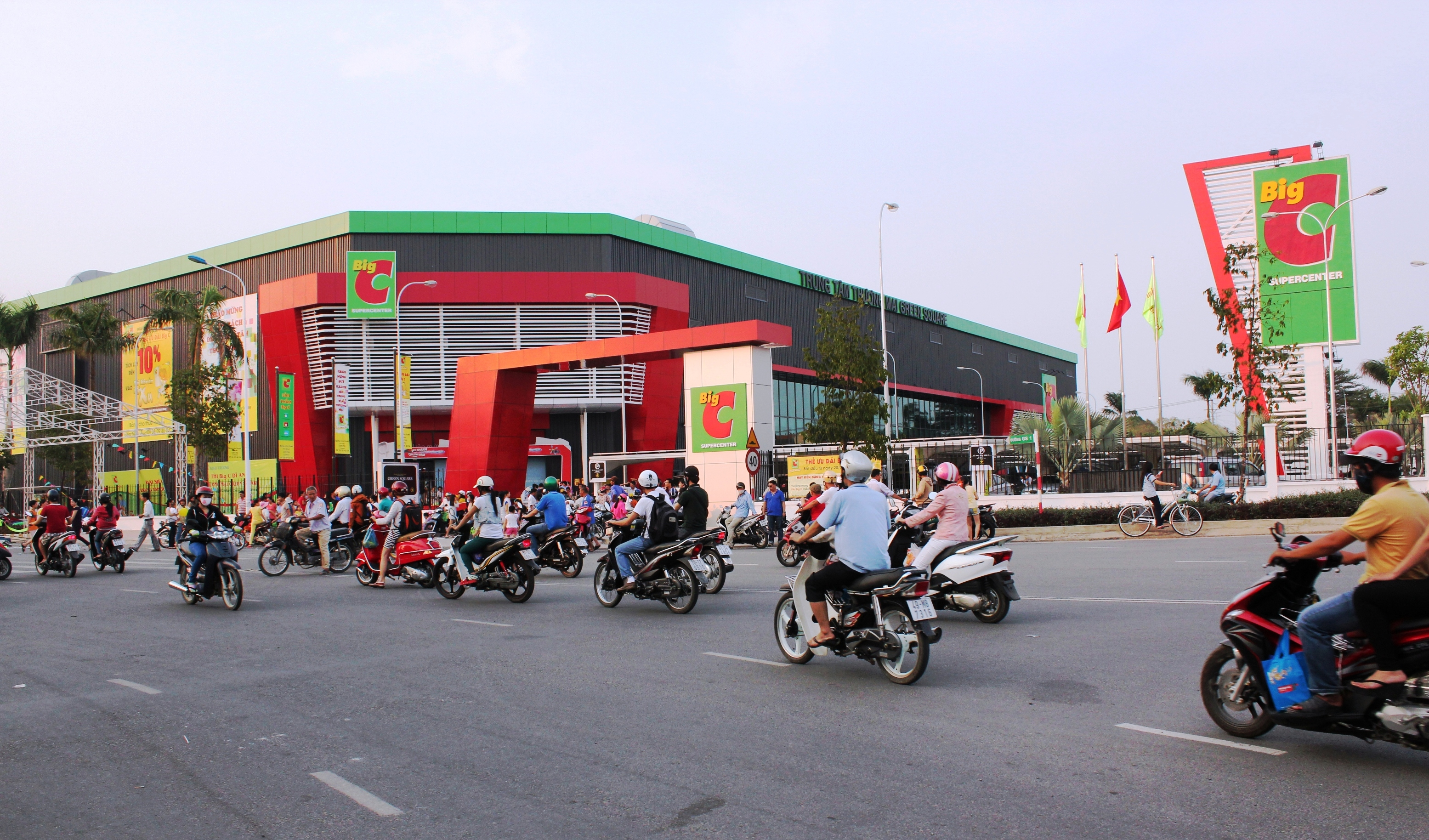
Big C Sri-Ar branch in Vietnam

The "Big C" brand was used for the first time outside Thailand at the end of 2003, with the rebranding of three Cora hypermarkets in Vietnam. The stores were owned by Vindemia, a Groupe Bourbon company in Réunion. Casino took control of Vindemia, and the Big C Supercenter banner is used for these stores.

In 2010, Big C announced that it would open its first store in Laos, inside The New Taladsao Shopping Mall in Vientiane, in late 2012.

=== Carrefour acquisition ===
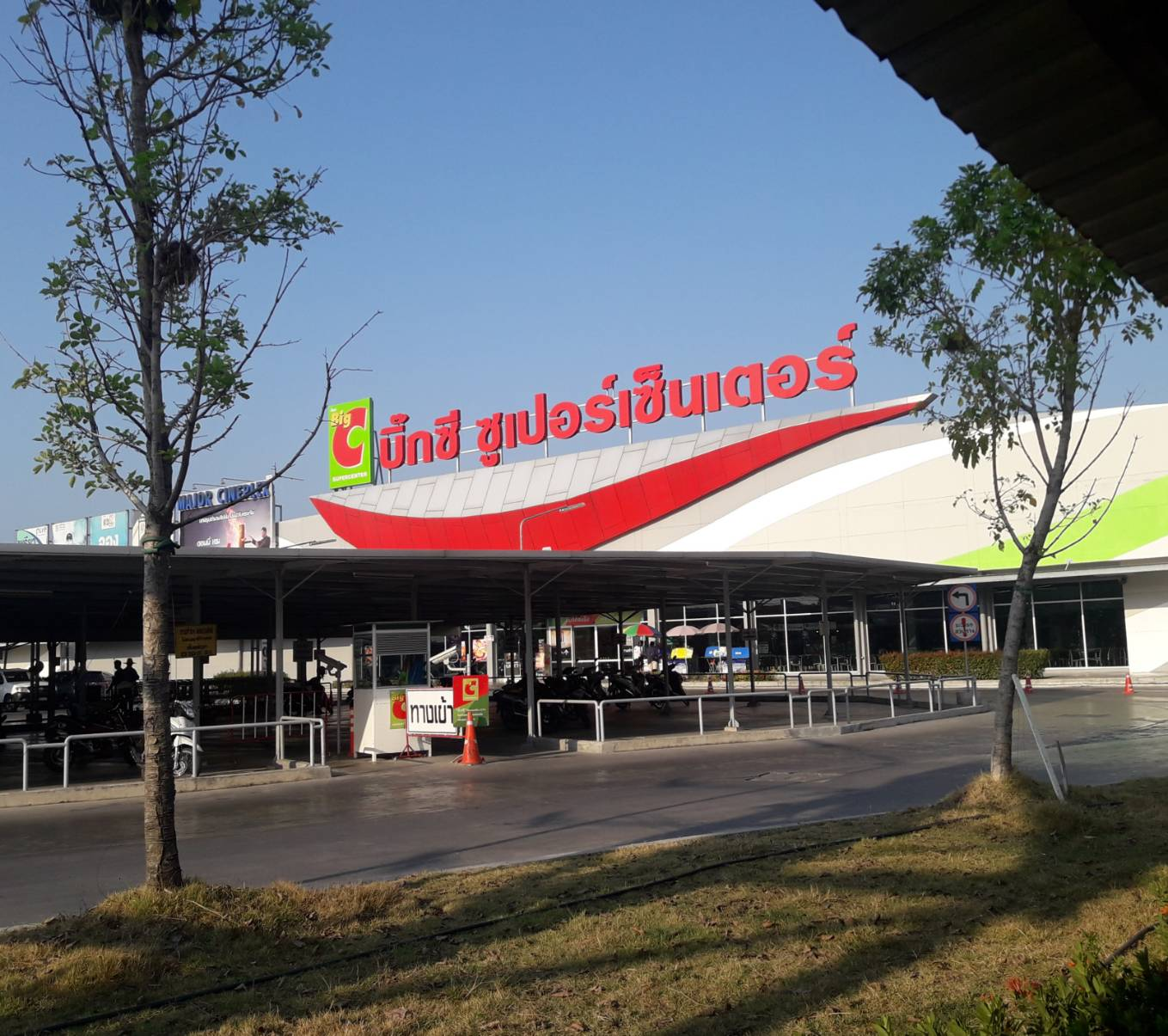
Big C Pathum Thani Branch, Thailand

In November 2010, Big C won a bid to buy the 42 Carrefour branches in Thailand for €868 million (35.4 billion baht). After the acquisition, Groupe Casino, whose Thai subsidiary is Big C Supercenter PCL, owned 111 hypermarkets versus Tesco's 87. However, if other retail formats are included, Tesco is larger with some 704 stores nationwide.

Big C and Carrefour branches in Thailand had their first co-promotion in January 2011, before Carrefour Thailand stores were rebranded as Big C. In March 2011, Carrefour Suwintawong was the first Carrefour store to be rebranded as a Big C.

In 2013, Big C main competitor, Lotus's, was ordered by the Civil Court of Thailand to pay ฿4 million to Big C following from a campaign in 2011 by Ek-chai Distribution Centre to use Carrefour coupons. Carrefour was at that time the local operator of Lotus's hypermarkets, but was later taken over by Big C which caused the lawsuit. In the lawsuit, Big C claimed damages of ฿416 million.

=== Ownership under Thai Charoen Corporation ===
Groupe Casino SA agreed in February 2016 to sell its stake in Thai hypermarket operator Big C for €3.1 billion (US$3.46 billion) to Thai billionaire, Mr Charoen Sirivadhanabhakdi. His holding company, TCC Group, announced that it would acquire Casino's 58.6% stake in Big C Thailand for 252.88 baht a share (US$7.10), valuing Big C close to US$5.86 billion at the time of sale. The sale allowed Casino to reduce its debt level by €3.3 billion. The retailer launched a €4 billion deleveraging plan in 2016 which included selling its stake in Big C as well as Vietnam retail assets. Big C is now operated and managed under Berli Jucker Public Company Limited, part of TCC Group.

=== 2017 terrorist attack ===
On 9 May 2017, a Big C supermarket in Pattani was the subject of a terrorist attack which injured around 80 people. The attack was most likely perpetrated by local Muslim residents, although Lieutenant General Piyawat Nakwanich said that it was most likely a reaction against the presence of big businesses in the area.

=== Abandoned Tesco Lotus acquisition plan ===
In January 2020, CEO Aswin Techajareonvikul acknowledged the company's intent to acquire the operations of Tesco Lotus in Thailand and Malaysia. TCC Group (the parent company of Big C) submitted a bid, however, following financial troubles caused by the COVID-19 pandemic, did not acquire the company. The sale of Tesco Lotus to the Charoen Pokphand (CP Group) was approved in November 2020 for US$10.6 billion, and was later rebranded as Lotus's.

=== Recent developments ===
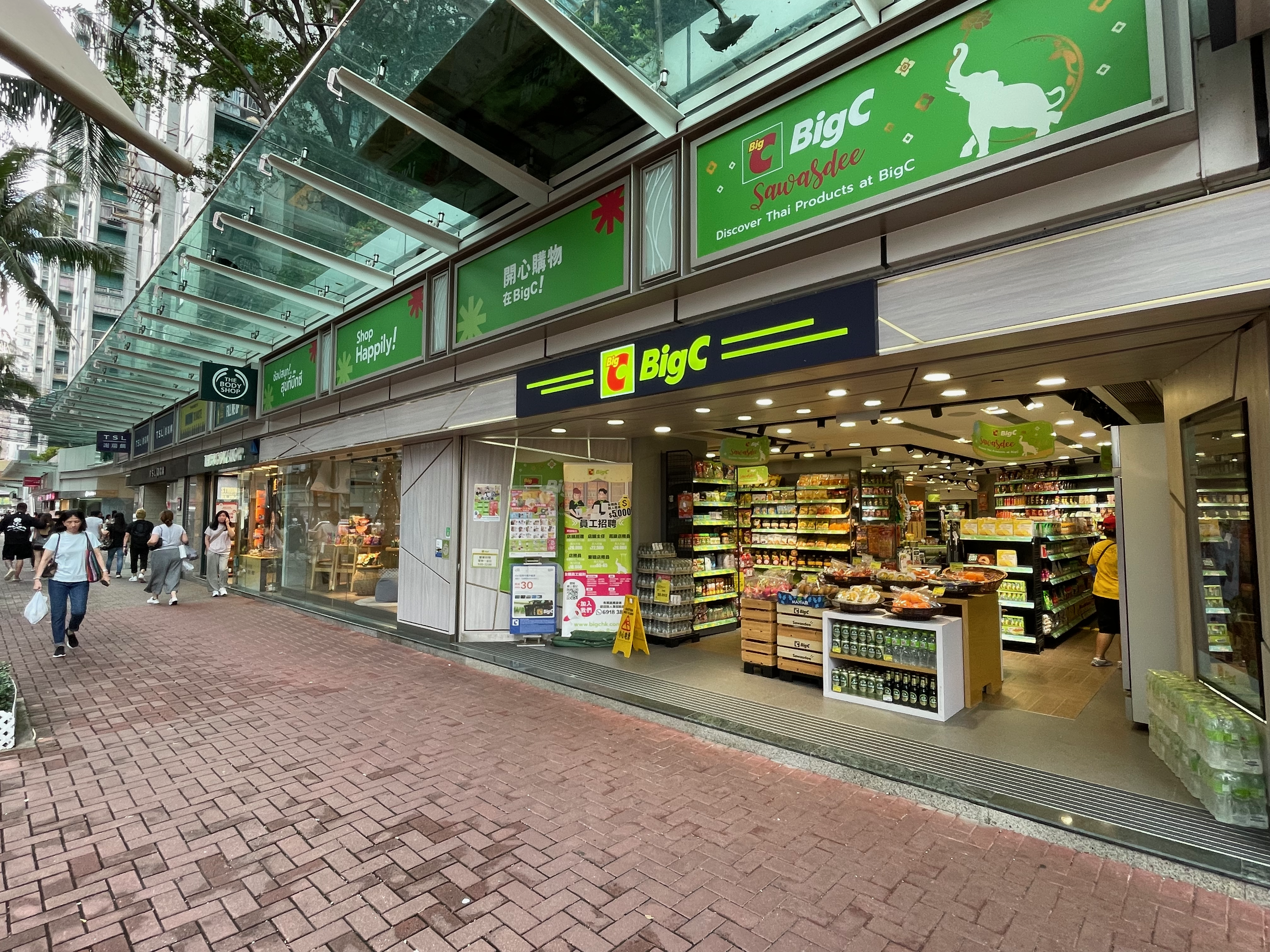
Big C Whampoa Garden Branch, Hung Hom, Hong Kong

In 2023, Big C took over 24 AbouThai stores in Hong Kong with plans to rebrand them as Big C. In August, the CEO announced plans for Big C to be dual listed on the Stock Exchanges of Thailand and Hong Kong during the fourth quarter. On 29 August, Big C postponed its return to the Stock Exchange of Thailand due to market conditions caused by the political climate of deadlock following the 2023 elections.

== Store formats ==
- Big C (Thai: บิ๊กซี) A Big C Supercenter is a hypermarket targeting mid-to-low income customers. There are 138 Big C Supercenters in Thailand and one in PoiPet, Cambodia as of 2022.
- Big C Extra (Thai: บิ๊กซี เอ็กซ์ตร้า) is a hypermarket targeting mid- to high-income customers. It offers a wider range of fresh and dry food items, imported products, and wine than a Big C Supercenter. There are 15 Big C Extra stores in Thailand as of end-2022.
- Big C Place (Thai: บิ๊กซี เพลส) is The shopping center/hypermarket format, originally an extension of the Big C Rama IV branch on the eastern land of the building under the name "Big C Plaza," has now become the primary format for standalone buildings, with some branches renovated from existing Big C and Big C Extra locations.
- Big C Marché (Thai: บิ๊กซี มาร์เช่) is an exclusive supermarket located in One Bangkok (Big C Bangkok Marché) and Bluport Huahin (Big C Huahin Marché) targeting high-value income customers. It offers 3 shop-in-shop concepts. The supermarket offers more imported products and fresh and dry food items than a Big C Foodplace. The restaurant presents the premium meals, as well as the grill bar that you can pick any items in store and bring it to cook for meals. And the wine cellar, presenting a wider range of Wine and Alcoholic around the world.
- Big C Foodplace (Thai: บิ๊กซี ฟู้ดเพลส) s an urban supermarket targeting urban upmarket customers. The stores are located in urban locations and focus in offering a selection of products, particularly ready-to-eat meals, organic foods, healthy foods, and imported products. At the end of 2022, Big C Foodplace had a total of 11 branches.
- Mini Big C (Thai: มินิบิ๊กซี) Mini Big C is a "proximity store" format targeting mid- to low-income customers. Mini Big C stores carry a larger assortment than typical convenience stores and offer selected promotional items. The average size of a Mini Big C store is around 80–250 m^{2}, open 24/7. There are 1,430 Mini Big C stores in Thailand as of end-2022.
- Pure by Big C (Thai: เพียว บาย บิ๊กซี) is a drugstore format offering pharmaceutical, health, beauty, and wellness products. Most of Pure drugs, Promotion, Blond Kid, ores are in Big C hypermarkets and Big C Markets. There are 146 Pure outlets in Thailand (2022).

Former Store Formats

- Big C Plaza (Thai: บิ๊กซี พลาซา)
- Big C Market (Thai: บิ๊กซี มาร์เก็ต)
- Big C Depot (Thai: บิ๊กซี ดีโป้) is a wholesale format targeting HORECA customers. Formerly Big C Market stores. At the end of 2022, Big C Depot had a total of 11 branches.

== Outside of Thailand ==
=== Laos ===
41 M-Point Mart stores in Vientiane were rebranded to Mini Big C in June 2019. In early 2023, Big C began construction on its first hypermarket in Vientiane with the aim of opening in April 2024. Construction is being supported by Lao investors.

There are currently 66 Mini Big C branches operating in Vientiane. Big C's products in Laos differs from stores in other countries, as Lao stores instead have more products that appeal better to the Lao market. Products are either sourced locally, or imported from Thailand, Vietnam, China or Europe. Products produced in Laos are also being distributed by Big C to stores across different countries in cooperation with the Ministry of Industry and Commerce. The two signed on 19 November 2020 a Memorandum of Understanding.

=== Cambodia ===
Big C Supercenter: Big C opened its first Cambodian store in Poipet on 4 December 2019. The company invested 300 million baht to build Big C Poipet on 20 rai. The hypermarket is 8,000 m^{2}, with 3,000 m^{2} of sales area and rental space of 5,000 m^{2}.

In early 2023, Big C partnered with the Overseas Cambodian Investment Corporation (OCIC) to construct the first hypermarket in Khan Chroy Changvar.

Big C plans to open five or six Big C hypermarket stores in Phnom Penh and Siem Reap over the next two years. They plan to open 350 stores in the country in every province of Cambodia over the next 5 years.

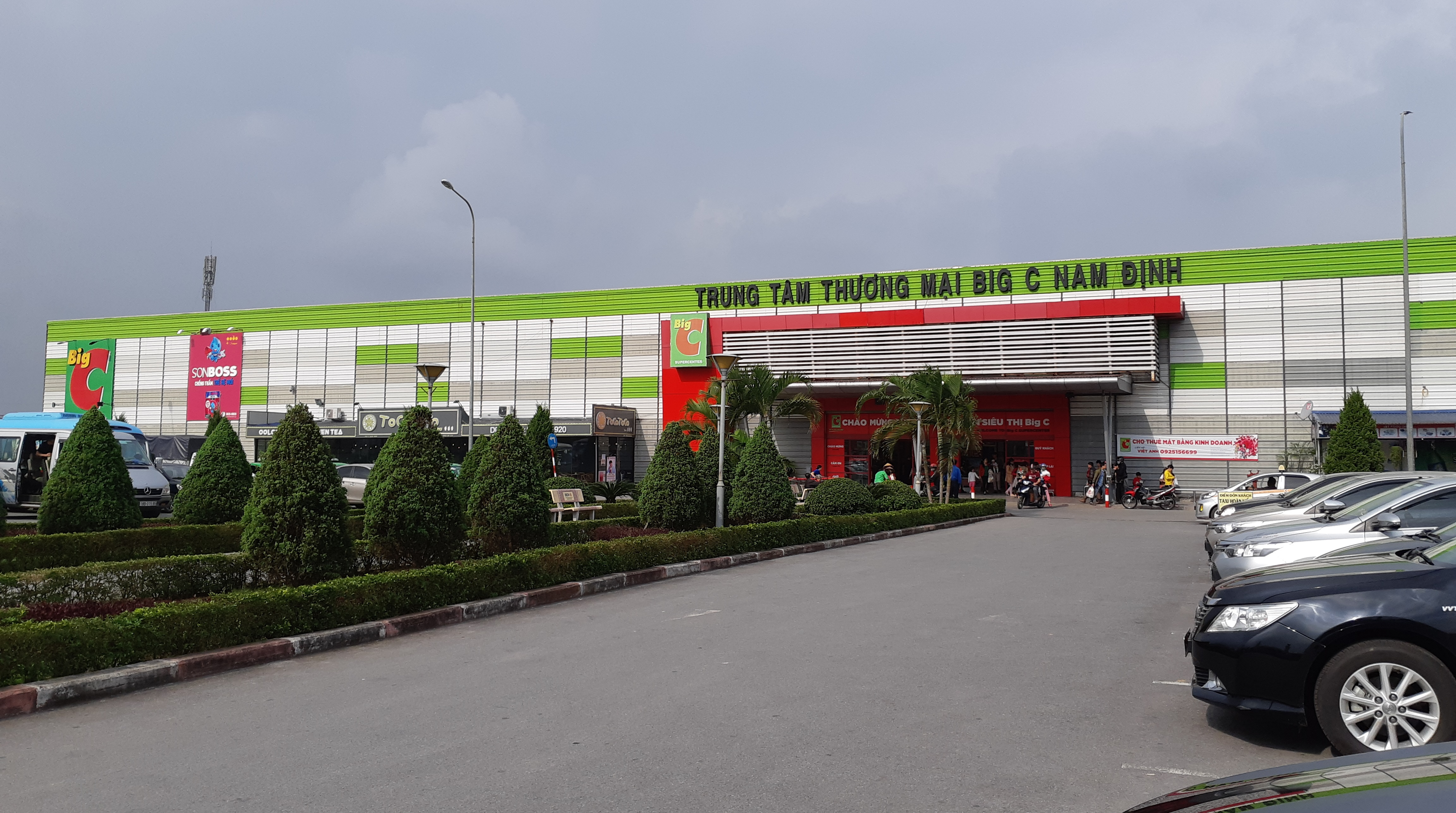
Big C in Nam Định, 2018

Mini Big C: On 5 September 2021, Big C opened its first Mini Big C store in Phnom Penh. Its opening was attended by government officials, business people and the Thai ambassador. On 16 September, it opened its first Big C Mini in Phnom Penh.

In 2022, Big C acquired Kiwi Mart and its 18 stores.

As of the end of 2022, there are 17 Big C Mini and 2 Kiwi Premium stores in Cambodia.

=== Vietnam ===
Big C has 35 stores throughout Vietnam, all owned by Central Group, which rebranded them under its GO! and Tops Market retail brands from late 2020 to early 2021. Berli Jucker, which owns a majority stake in Big C in Thailand, Laos, and Cambodia, invested one billion baht in 2020 to open three MM Mega Market wholesale stores in Vietnam the following year, bringing the total number of MM Mega Market stores there to 21 branches.

=== Hong Kong ===
On 23 August 2023, Big C acquired local Thai retailer AbouThai and rebranded them into Big C stores. By 2026, Big C will expand its network to 100 locations in Hong Kong.
