= Nguyenkim Shopping Center =

Vietnamese consumer electronics retail chain

Nguyenkim Trading Joint Stock Company
- Company type: Public
- Website type: E-commerce
- Available in: English, Vietnamese
- Founded: 1992
- Headquarters: Ho Chi Minh City, Vietnam
- Area served: Vietnam
- Owner: Pico
- Founder: Nguyễn Văn Kim
- Industry: Retail; Electronics; Online shopping
- Products: Audios; Videos; Major appliances Small appliances Computers; Mobiles; Games
- Website: https://www.nguyenkim.com/

Nguyenkim Shopping Center is a Vietnamese consumer electronics retail chain. Established in 1992, the company operates a network of stores specializing in home appliances, digital devices, and entertainment systems.

== History ==
Nguyen Kim was founded in 1992 in Ho Chi Minh City, initially operating as a retail shop for electronics. In 1996, the company opened its first large-scale retail center on Tran Hung Dao Street and later expanded its operations to Hanoi in 2007.

In 2015, Central Group acquired a 49% stake in Nguyen Kim. Subsequently, in June 2019, the company took full operational control by acquiring the remaining 51% of NKT New Solution and Technology Development (the owner of Nguyen Kim) for VND 2.66 trillion (US$115 million).

In December 2025, Central Group divested Nguyen Kim, selling the chain to local competitor Pico for 1.1 billion baht (US$36 million).
