= Bang Khun Thian district =

Bang Khun Thian บางขุนเทียน
- Khet
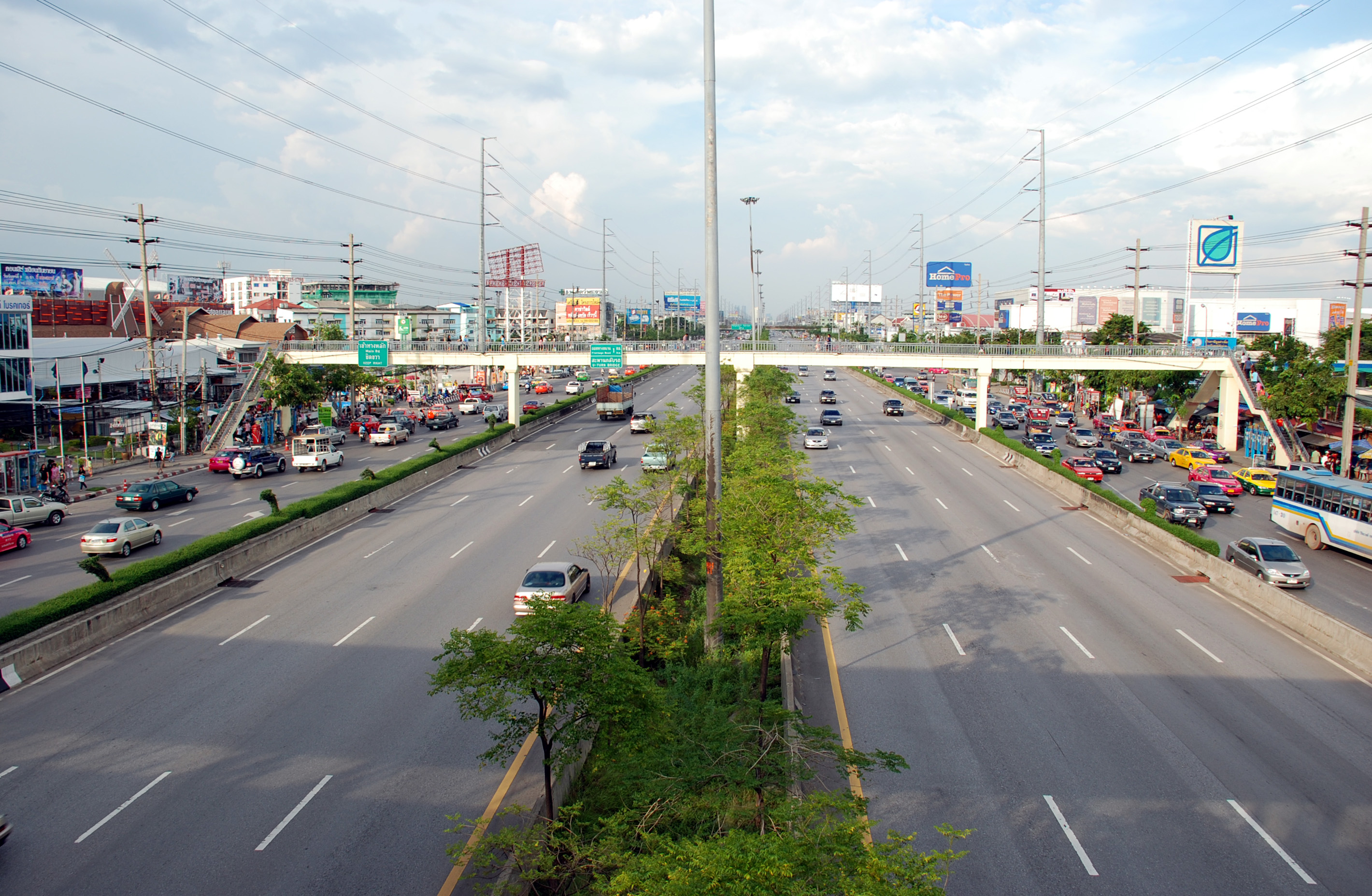
- Rama II road in the area of Bang Khun Thian

- Khet location in Bangkok
- Coordinates: 13°39′39″N 100°26′9″E
- Country: Thailand
- Province: Bangkok
- Seat: Samae Dam
- Khwaeng: 2

Area
  - Total: 120.687 km^{2} (46.598 sq mi)

Population (2017)
  - Total: 182,235
  - Density: 1,509.98/km^{2} (3,910.8/sq mi)
- Time zone: UTC+7 (ICT)
- Postal code: 10150
- Geocode: 1021

Bang Khun Thian (Thai: บางขุนเทียน, pronounced [bāːŋ kʰǔn tʰīan]) is one of the 50 districts (khet) of Bangkok, Thailand. Its neighbors, clockwise from the north, are Bang Bon, Chom Thong, and Thung Khru Districts of Bangkok, Phra Samut Chedi district of Samut Prakan province and Mueang Samut Sakhon district of Samut Sakhon province. Bang Khun Thian is Bangkok's southernmost district, and the only one bordering the Bay of Bangkok (upper Gulf of Thailand).

== History ==
Bang Khun Thian is an old district, believed to have been established in 1867 as an amphoe of Thonburi.

In 1972, Thonburi and Phra Nakhon Provinces were combined into Bangkok metropolis. Administrative units in the newly combined capital province were renamed from amphoe and tambon to "district" (khet) and "sub-district" (khwaeng). Thus, Bang Khun Thian became a district of Bangkok, composed of seven sub-districts: Bang Khun Thian, Bang Kho, Chom Thong, Bang Mot, Tha Kham, Bang Bon, and Samae Dam.

Due to population increases, a portion of Bang Khun Thian district was set up with its own district office and called Bang Khun Thian Branch 1. This new unit oversaw four sub-districts: Bang Khun Thian, Bang Kho, Bang Mot, and Chom Thong. In 1989, Bang Khun Thian Branch 1 was made a full district called Chom Thong District. In 1997, Bang Bon sub-district was separated from Bang Khun Thian and became its own district.

== Economy ==
Bang Khun Thian, particularly its Tha Kham Sub-district, is a centre of seafood aquaculture, mostly shrimp. Most of Tha Kam's residents—70 to 80%—are aquaculture farmers and aquaculture occupies much of the district's land area. The industry is jeopardised by coastal erosion—the shoreline has retreated more than a kilometre since 1952—and since 2009, wastewater pollution has negatively impacted cultivation and farmer incomes have declined by 30–90 percent.

== Administration ==
The district is divided into two sub-districts (khwaeng).

No.	Name	Thai	Area (km^{2})	Map
5.	Tha Kham	ท่าข้าม	84.712	Map
7.	Samae Dam	แสมดำ	35.975	Map
Total			120.687	Map

The missing numbers 1, 2, 3, 4 and 6 belong to the sub-districts which were split off to form Chom Thong and Bang Bon districts.

== Places ==
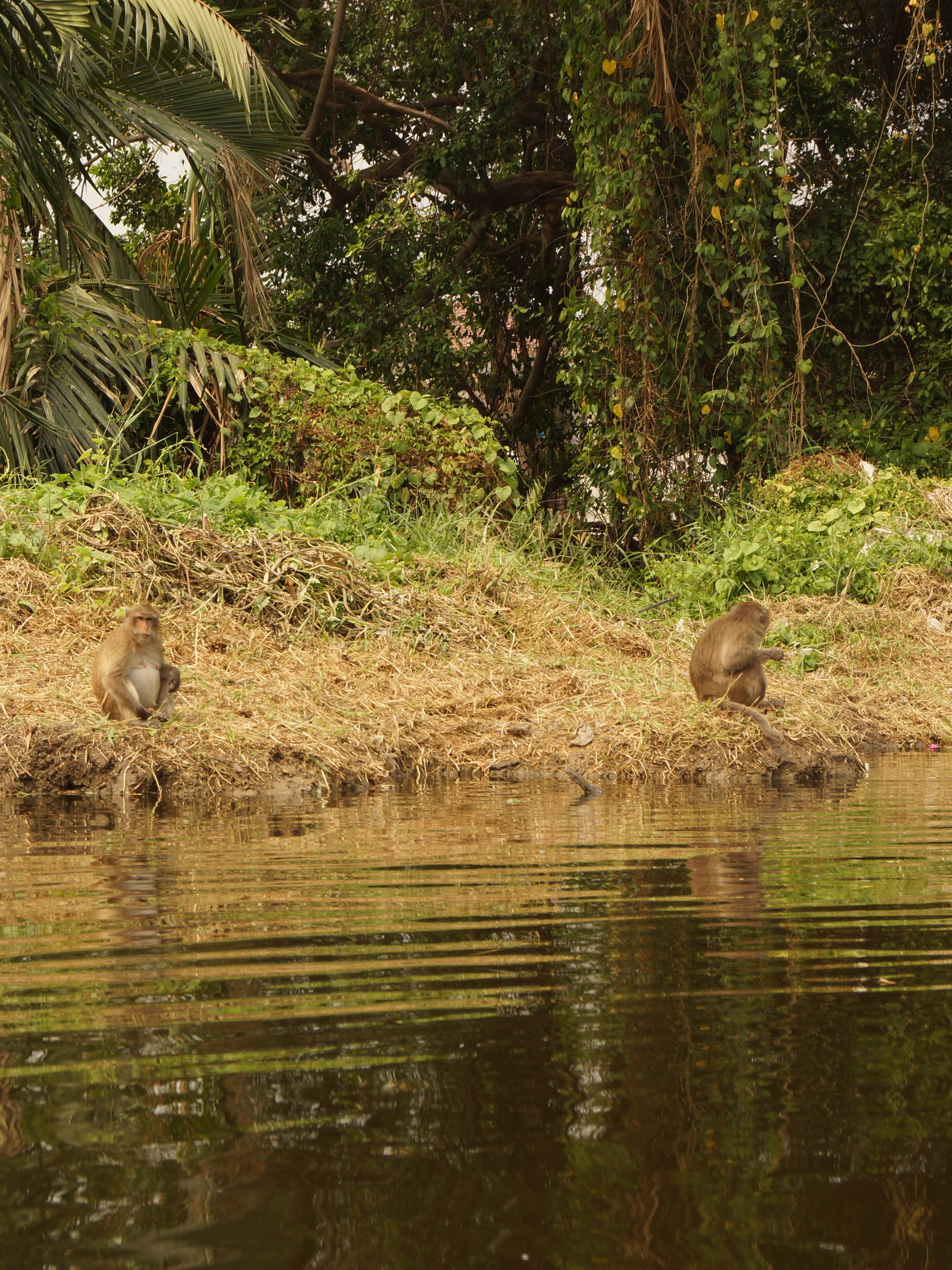
Monkeys in Tha Kham, Bang Khun Thian

Bang Khun Thian has Bangkok's only seashore. The coastline, about 5 km (3.1 mi) long, is muddy and contains mangrove forests as well as shrimp farms. The only way to access the Bay of Bangkok here is by boat. A group of crab-eating macaques (Macaca fascicularis, Thai ลิงแสม), a species of monkey, inhabits the coastal area. A fishing community is located nearby, and the seashore is known for its seafood restaurants.

Besides this, Bang Khun Thian's mangrove forests are also home to the last group of smooth-coated otters (Lutrogale perspicillata, Thai นากใหญ่ขนเรียบ) in Bangkok.

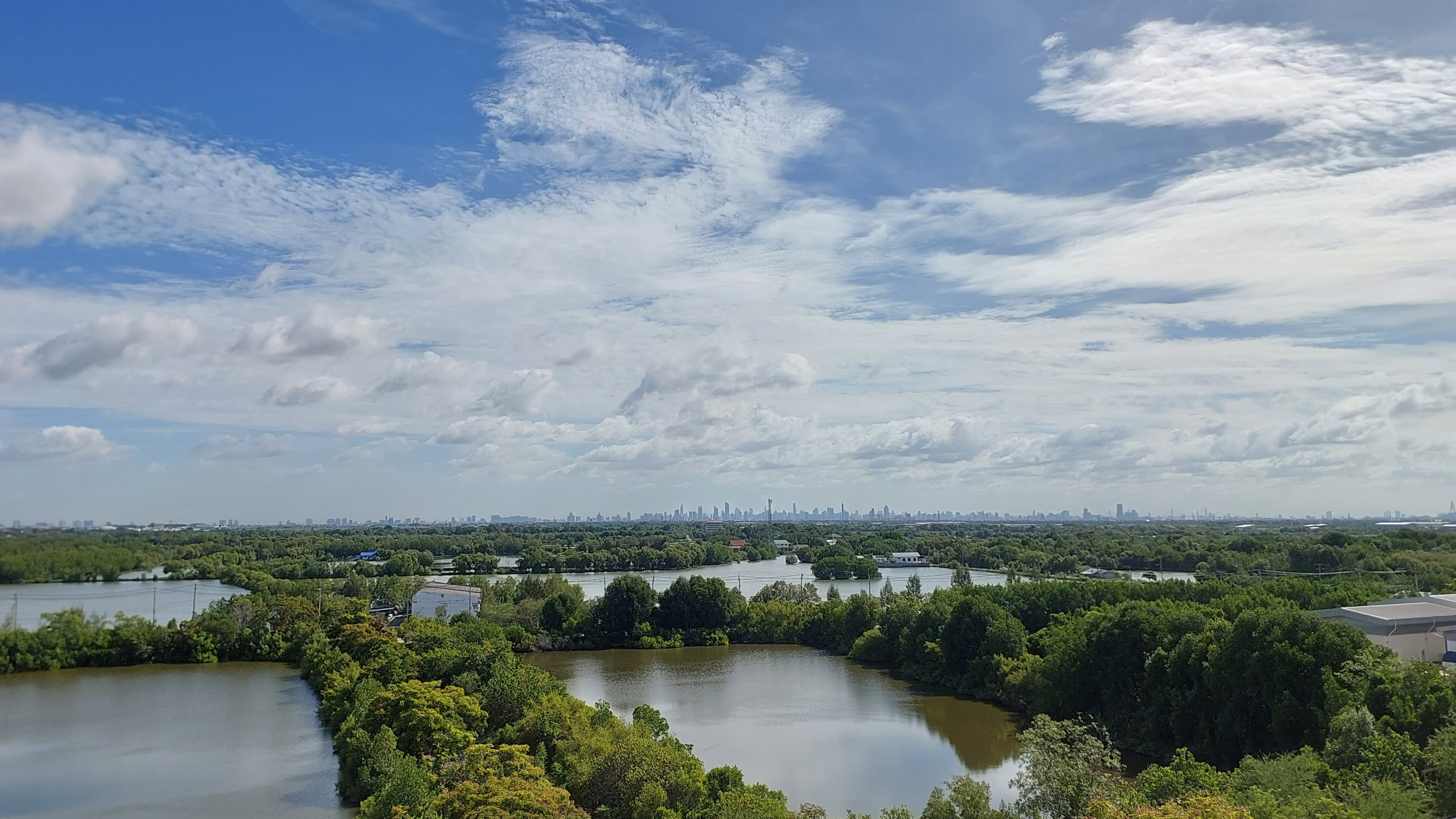
Bang Khun Thian, facing northeast towards central Bangkok

Facing northeast towards central Bangkok, Bang Khun Thian hosts important temples such as Wat Kamphaeng (วัดกำแพง), Wat Kok (วัดกก), Wat Tha Kham (วัดท่าข้าม), Wat Hua Krabue (วัดหัวกระบือ), and Wat Bang Kradi (วัดบางกระดี่).

Bang Kradi in Samae Dam is reputed to be the residence of the Thai Mon people.

Central Rama II is the main shopping mall in the district, accompanied by a Lotus's and two Big C malls.

Taweethapisek Bangkhunthian School (a branch of Taweethapisek School), Khlong Pittayalongkorn School, and Ratthanakosinsomphod Bangkhunthian School are the primary schools in the area.
