= Om Noi =

Om Noi อ้อมน้อย
- City Municipality
- City of Om Noi เทศบาลนครอ้อมน้อย
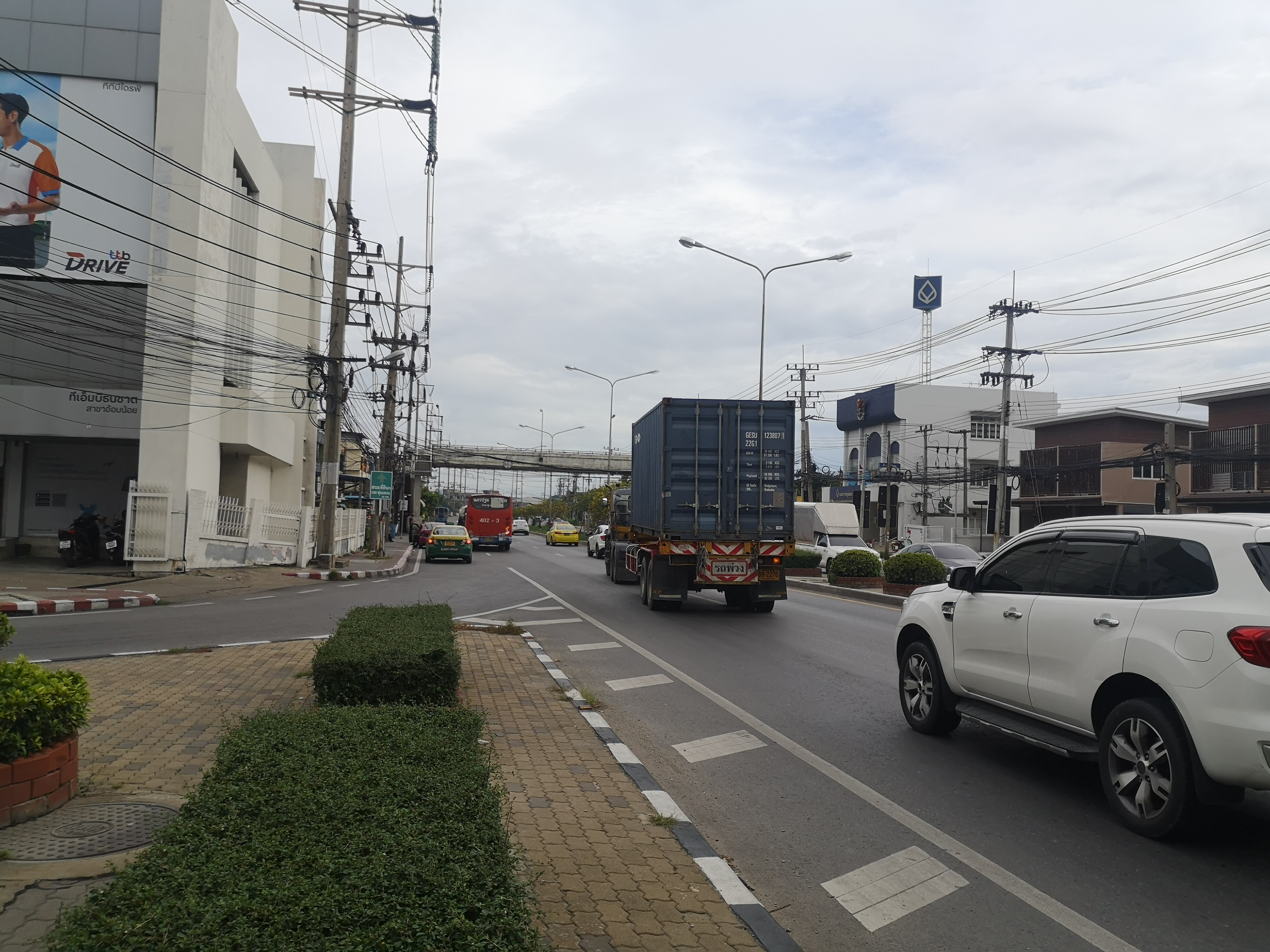

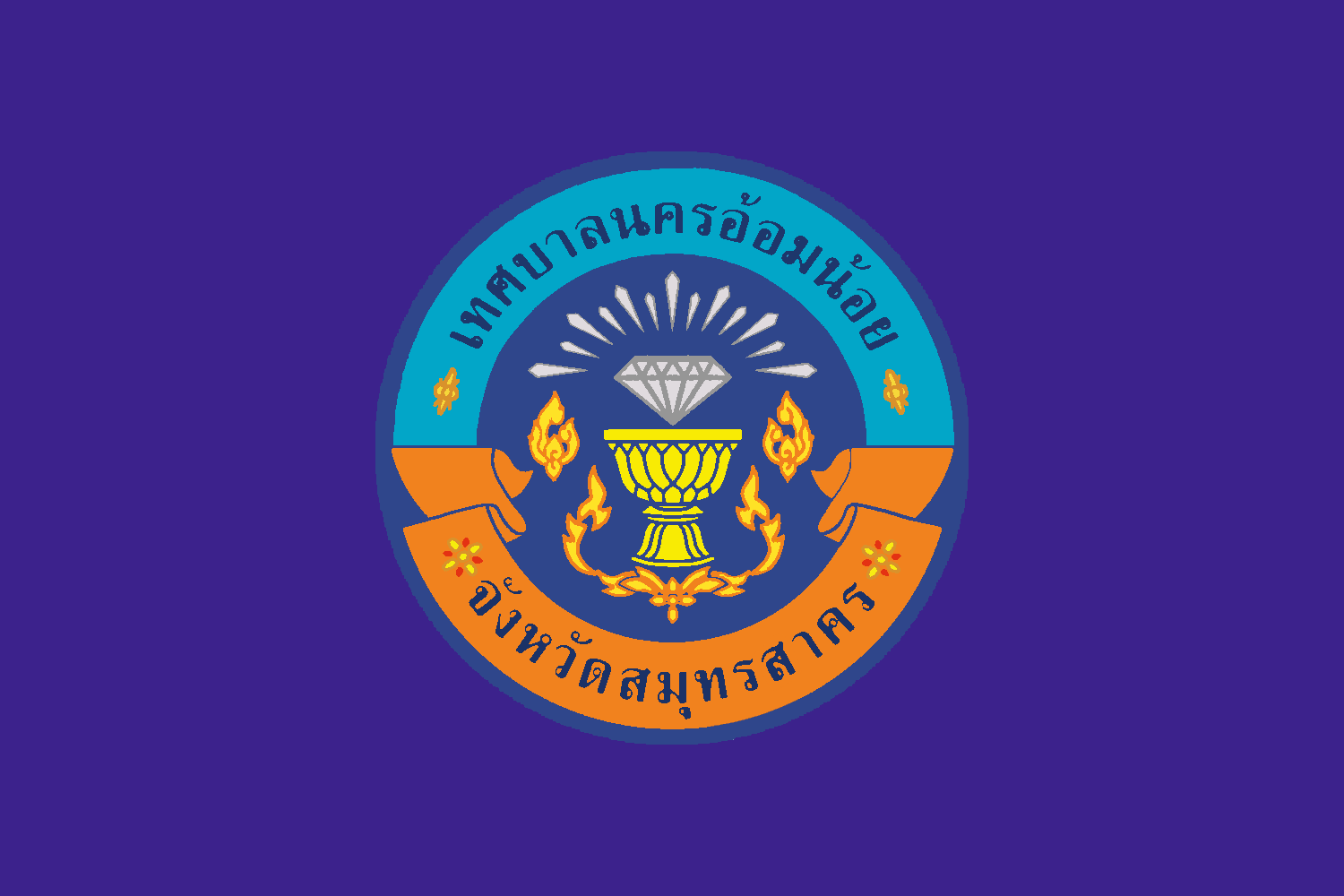
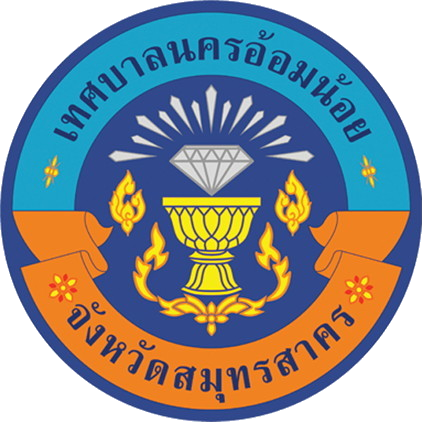
- Flag Seal
- Motto: Thai: ศรัทธาหลวงพ่อเพ็ง หลวงพ่อพักตร์ อนุรักษ์วัฒนธรรมไทย ลือไกลอุตสาหกรรม งามล้ำเบญจรงค์
- Location in Bangkok Metropolitan Region Location in Thailand
- Coordinates: 13.7001°N 100.3241°E
- Country: Thailand
- Region: Central Thailand
- Province: Samut Sakhon
- District: Krathum Baen
- Subdistrict municipality: 1 May 1994
- Town municipality: 21 September 2002
- City municipality: 27 December 2010

Government
  - Type: City Municipality

Area
  - Total: 30.40 km^{2} (11.74 sq mi)
- Elevation: 7.0 m (23.0 ft)

Population (2024)
  - Total: 53,914
  - Density: 1,773/km^{2} (4,590/sq mi)
- Time zone: UTC+7 (ICT)
- Postcode: 74130
- Calling code: 034
- ISO 3166 code: TH-74020200
- Local Admin. Org.: code
- Om Noi city mun.: 03740201
- Website: omnoi.go.th

Om Noi (Thai: อ้อมน้อย, RTGS: Om Noi) officially the City of Om Noi (Thai: เทศบาลนครอ้อมน้อย, RTGS: Thetsaban Nakhon Om Noi) is a municipality in Samut Sakhon, Thailand. It is located 13 km west from Bangkok. The city was established in 2010.

== History ==
Om Noi was upgraded to subdistrict municipality (thesaban tambon) on 1 May 1994. Later to town municipality (thesaban mueang) on 21 September 2002. Finally on 27 December 2010 to city municipality (thesaban nakhon).

== Geography ==
Neighbouring subdistricts are (from the west clockwise): Om Yai, Rai Khing and Krathum Lom of Sam Phran district, Nakhon Pathom province; Nong Khang Phlu of Nong Khaem district, Bangkok; Suan Luang and Tha Mai of Krathum Baen district, Samut Sakhon province.
The main watercourse of Samut Sakhon province, Tha Chin River flows into the Gulf of Thailand at Bang Ya Phraek subdistrict.

== Administration ==
=== Provincial government ===
The administration of Om Noi subdistrict (tambon) is responsible for an area that covers 30.4 square kilometres (11.7 sq mi) and consists of thirteen villages (muban), as of December 2024: 53,9148 people and 51,913 households.

No.	Villages	Thai	Pop.
1.	Pak Khlong Om Noi	ปากคลองอ้อมน้อย	627
2.	Khlong Talad	คลองตลาด	7,922
3.	Rang Nam Sai	รางน้ำใส	2,531
4.	Taew	แถว	3,659
5.	Na Don	นาดอน	8,445
6.	Huathanon	ห้วถนน	2,602
7.	Tan Kloeway	ต้นกล้วย	825
8.	Nong Bua	หนองบัว	3,028
9.	Nong Nok Krasa	หนองนอกกระสา	2,987
10.	Krathum Lom	กระทุ่มล้ม	3,522
11.	Don Song	ดอนสอง	3,933
12.	Sri Samran	ศรีสำราญ	5,140
13.	Rong Mu	โรงหมู	8,693
		Total	53,914

=== Local government ===
As of December 2024 there is Om Noi city municipality (thesaban nakhon), which covers the whole subdistrict.
There are 28 communities (chumchon) in Om Noi, although not directly chosen by the local citizens, which provides advice and recommendations to the local administrative organization.

== Healthcare ==
=== Hospitals ===
There are in the subdistrict: Mahachai 2 Hospital with 200 beds and Vichaivaj International Hospital Om Noi with 196 beds.

=== Health promoting hospitals ===
There is one health-promoting hospital in the subdistrict (Moo10).

== Education ==
There are four primary schools:

- Ban Klong Kae school - Moo2.
- Wat Om Noi school - Moo4.
- Om Noi municipal school - Moo13.
- Wat Sri Samranrat Bamrung school.

There is one secondary school:

- Om Noi Sobhon Chanupatham school - Moo4.

There is one vocational school:

- Om Noi municipal vocational college.

== Religion ==
The following active temples, where Theravada Buddhism is practised by local residents:

Temple name	Thai	Location
Wat Om Noi	วัดอ้อมน้อย	Moo4
Wat Si Samranrat Bamrung	วัดศรีสำราญราษฎร์บำรุง	Moo12

== Transportation ==
Because it is situated in Bangkok Metropolitan Region, making Om Noi easily accessible by three mainroads: Highway 4, Phutthamonthon Sai 4 Road (Highway 3310) and Phutthamonthon Sai 5 Road (Highway 3414).
The area is served by several bus lines of the Bangkok Mass Transit Authority (BMTA).
