= Rai Khing =

Rai Khing ไร่ขิง
- Town Municipality
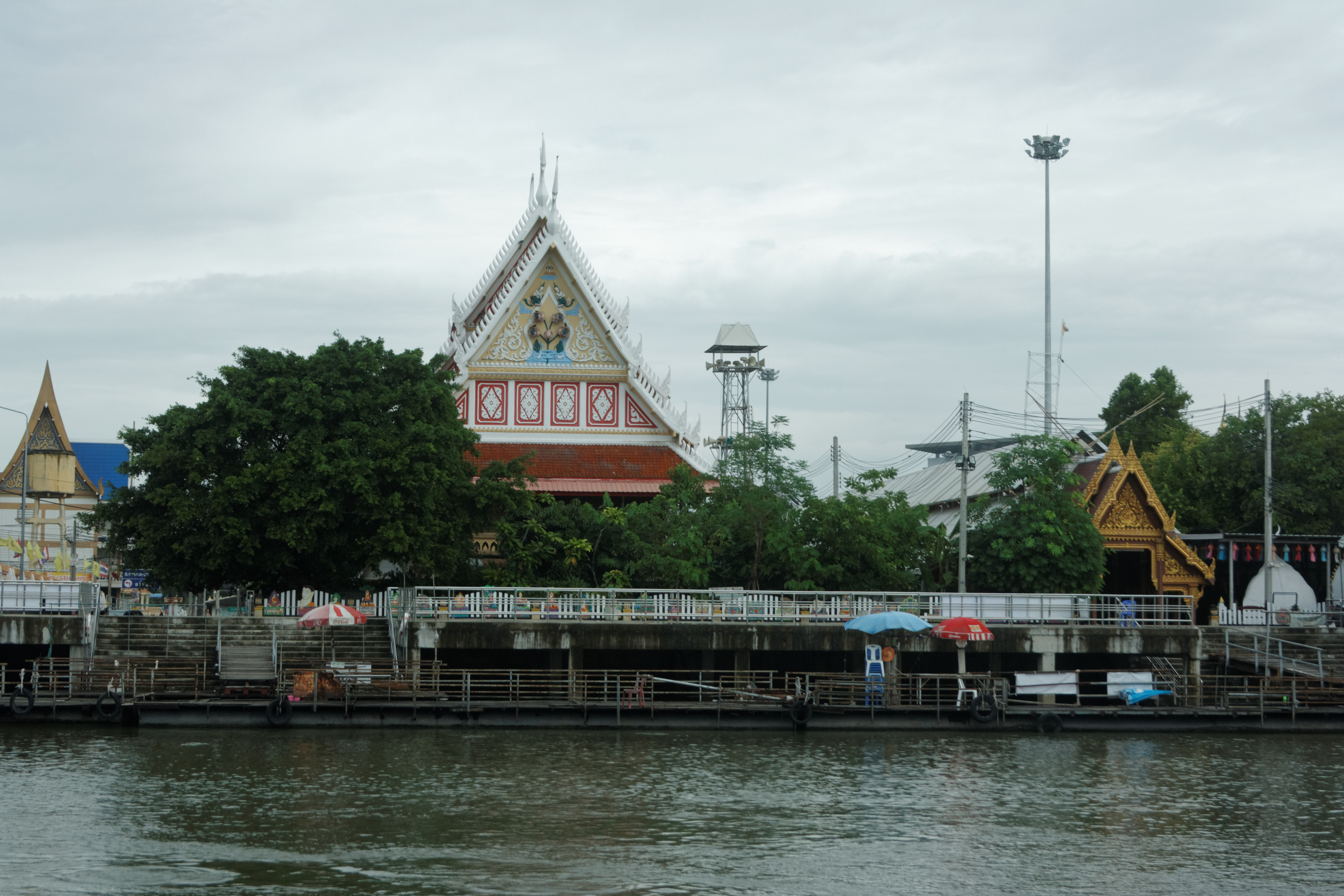
- Wat Rai Khing as seen from Tha Chin River

- Location within Bangkok Metropolitan Region Location within Thailand
- Coordinates: 13°44′21.3″N 100°15′25.6″E
- Country: Thailand
- Province: Nakhon Pathom
- District: Sam Phran
- Named for: Ginger Farm

Government
  - Mayor: Chamras Tangtrakultham
  - Deputy Mayor: Wannapha Ror Ritboon

Area
  - Total: 25.4 km^{2} (9.8 sq mi)

Population (2020)
  - Total: 33,549
  - Density: 1,320.83/km^{2} (3,420.9/sq mi)
- Time zone: UTC+7 (ICT)
- Postcode: 73210
- Area code: (+66) 02
- Website: https://www.raikhing.go.th/index.php?p=1

Rai Khing (Thai: ไร่ขิง, pronounced [râj kʰǐŋ]) is a tambon (subdistrict) of Sam Phran district, Nakhon Pathom province, western outskirts Bangkok.

== History ==
Rai Khing is not known exactly how long this area has been in existence. It only know that there were Chinese who settled in the area because it was suitable for planting ginger. Ginger was widely cultivated in large numbers, hence the name "Rai Khing" (ginger farm) since then.

Famous local Buddhist temple, Wat Rai Khing, according to the history, it was built in 1851 during the reign of King Mongkut (Rama IV) and was named Wat Rai Khing, so it is assumed that Rai Khing subdistrict existed before the temple.

In the pre-1960s, Tha Chin water bus from Suphan Buri–Tha Tian in Bangkok also passed in front of the temple.

== Geography ==
Rai Khing is considered to be the central part of the district with Tha Chin River (locally known as Nakhon Chai Si River) flows through the area. It is about 8 km (5.0 mi) west of downtown Sam Phran and about 25 km (15.5 mi) from downtown Nakhon Pathom.

It has a total area of approximately 25.4 km^{2} or approximately 15,875 rai. Most of the general characteristics are vast plains with fertile land, and have good irrigation conditions with Tha Chin River as the main water resource emptying through and can be branched into 20 tributaries. The general condition of all waterways can still be used for consumption such as farming.

The area is hemmed by other subdistricts (from north clockwise): Bang Krathuek and Bang Toei in its district, Krathum Lom in its district and Om Noi in Krathum Baen District of neighbouring Samut Sakhon Province, Om Yai and Tha Kham in its district, and Tha Talat with Song Khanong in its district, respectively.

== Administration ==
The entire area of Rai Khing is governed by Rai Khing Municipality (เทศบาลเมืองไร่ขิง). It was promoted from the subdistrict municipality in 2008 and upgraded to a major town municipality in 2015.

Rai Khing also consists of 14 administrative muban (village).

No.	Name	Thai
1.	Ban Rai Khing	บ้านไร่ขิง
2.	Ban Rai	บ้านไร่
3.	Ban Khlong Mai	บ้านคลองใหม่
4.	Ban Khlong Manao	บ้านคลองมะนาว
5.	Ban Khlong Bang Phrao	บ้านคลองบางพร้าว
6.	Ban Khlong Ta Jun	บ้านคลองตาจุ่น
7.	Ban Pracha Ruam Jai	บ้านประชาร่วมใจ
8.	Ban Khlong Phi Suea	บ้านคลองผีเสื้อ
9.	Ban Khlong Wat Tha Phut	บ้านคลองวัดท่าพูด
10.	Ban Khlong Bang Sue	บ้านคลองบางซื่อ
11.	Ban Tha Kwian	บ้านท่าเกวียน
12.	Ban Khlong Chang	บ้านคลองฉาง
13.	Ban Khlong Bang Yang	บ้านคลองบางยาง
14.	Ban Khlong Rang Toei	บ้านคลองรางเตย

The emblem of the town municipality shows Luang Phor Wat Rai Khing, the highly revered principal Buddha statue of Wat Rai Khing.

Its slogan is "Rai Khing's Smile and Happiness".

== Places ==
- Wat Rai Khing
- Wat Tha Phut

== Local traditions ==
- Worshiping Luang Phor Wat Rai Khing during the Chinese New Year Festival every year.
- Gilding Luang Phor Wat Rai Khing is held annually at Wat Rai Khing during April shortly before the Songkran Festival.
- Tak Bat Devo and listening to sermons, including gilding Luang Phor Wat Rai Khing during the Buddhist Lent Festival around October.
- Loi Krathong Festival at Wat Tha Phut.

== Transportation ==
Rai Khing is accessible by the main road, Phet Kasem (Highway 4), that runs through the south to the northwest near the area. The subdistrict is crossed by Phutthamonthon Sai 6 Road (Highway 3316) that runs along Tha Chin River meander in the northwest of the area.

Air-conditioned bus route 84 runs from Krung Thon Buri BTS Station in Bangkok to the destination at Wat Rai Khing. While air-conditioned bus route 556 runs from nearby Don Wai Market and terminates at Bobae in Bangkok, passed in front of Wat Rai Khing as well.
