= Nong Khaem =

Nong Khaem can mean:

- Nong Khaem District, a district of Bangkok, Thailand
- Nong Khaem subdistrict, Bangkok, a subdistrict in Nong Khaem District, Bangkok
- Nong Khaem, Phrom Phiram, a subdistrict of the Phrom Phiram District of Phitsanulok Province, Thailand
