= 2025 Thai monk scandal =

Blackmailing event and Embezzlement case in Thailand

In 2025, there have been a number of embezzlement and sex scandals involving monks in Thailand. In early 2025, an investigation opened into a high profile abbot of Wat Rai Khing temple in Nakhon Pathom Province named Phra Thammavajiranuwat (known as Chao Khun Yaem). He is accused of embezzling about 847,000,000 Thai baht of the temple's money to pay for a betting website.

Another more high profile case was reported in July 2025 following the disappearance of Phra Thep Wachirapamok, a prominent Buddhist monk. The investigation led to the arrest of a woman who allegedly blackmailed thousands of monks with sexual videos. As of 14 July 2025, six senior monks have been defrocked and two remain missing.

== Background ==
90% of Thailand's population is Buddhist, and at any time there are approximately 200,000 monks and 85,000 novices.

== Phra Thammavajirayanavut (Yaem)'s case ==
In May 2025, a case involving a high-profile abbot of Wat Rai King in Sampran District, Nakhon Pathom Province which is being accused of embezzling money that belongs to the temple (at least 100 million baht). A female suspect named Aranyawan Wangthapan, 28, is alleged to have links to the gambling industry, was accused of receiving these funds. He then transfers the money to pay for the gambling website. . After being arrested, he was disrobed from the monkhood on 15 May, 2025.

The investigation results conducted by the Central Investigation Bureau reveals that at least more than 10 temples involved in this case.

== Sika Golf and senior monks case ==
On 15 July 2025, Wilawan Emsawat was arrested in Nonthaburi and charged with receiving stolen goods, extortion, and money laundering. In a 16 July 2025 interview, she admitted to multiple relationships with two monks, along with a religious professor. Five phones owned by Emsawat were found, including several containing images of her engaged in sexual acts with monks.

Police described Emsawat as having targeted senior monks.

== Aftermath and reaction ==
Following Emsawat's arrest, police announced they will conduct background checks on around 300,000 Buddhist monks in Thailand.
