= DeeDo =

Thai fruit juice brand

Foodstar
- Foodstar logo

- 1000-ml DeeDo lychee juice
- Native name: ฟู้ดสตาร์
- Company type: Private
- Industry: Beverage
- Founded: 1993; 33 years ago
- Founder: Chantra Pongsri
- Headquarters: 58 Moo 6 Phraprathon-Banpaew Road, Talat Chinda subdistrict, Sam Phran district, Nakhon Pathom province, Thailand
- Brands: DeeDo; Fruitku; Mikku
- Website: main.foodstar.co.th/en/home/

DeeDo (Thai: ดีโด้, pronounced [dīːdôː]) is a Thai fruit juice brand. It is the primary product of Foodstar (Thai: ฟู้ดสตาร์), a Nakhon Pathom-based company that also makes food and beverage products. It diversified beyond DeeDo fruit juices through its Mikku yogurt brand as well as by selling herbal teas, ice pops, and jelly. Foodstar's original products occupied the economy and super-economy segments of the fruit juice market. The company in 2021 released DeeDo Max C, a more premium product that contains double the amount of orange juice of the original product. Its products in 2023 could be purchased in 20 countries.

Along with seven friends and workers, Chantra Pongsri established Foodstar in 1993. They released the DeeDo brand in 1995 and broke even and began turning a profit four years later. To distinguish themselves from competitors entering the fruit juice market, Foodstar began creating television advertisements in 2006 and later used celebrity branding to promote its products. Foodstar partnered with the actor Tasit Sinkanawiwat in 2008, the actor Saranyu Winaipanit in 2013, the Burmese actor Aung Ye Lin in 2016, the singer Jannine Weigel in 2016, the actor Mario Maurer in 2017, the actress Supassra Thanachat in 2021, and the singers Ble Patumrach R-Siam and Phuwasit Ananphonsiri in 2023.

== History ==
Kitti Pongsri founded a company that sold instant noodles and wanted to diversify into other products. Noting that few Thai companies sold fruit juice, he decided it was the right product. His daughter, Chantra Pongsri, recruited seven friends and workers to found Foodstar in 1993. The founders came from a food and beverage background, having previously worked at the seasoning powder brand Fa Thai (Thai: ฟ้าไทย) and the instant noodle brand Wai Wai. The company began selling the fruit juice brand DeeDo to consumers in 1995. It took four years after DeeDo's launch for company to break-even and start turning a profit. International consumers initially became familiar with Foodstar's products through border trade, and the company in 2011 started exporting its goods. For instance, after two to three years of border trade with Myanmar, Foodstar partnered with the distributors MK Distribution and Honestly Business Enterprise to sell the products directly to customers.

After conducting a test on Foodstar's DeeDo juice in 2014, Myanmar's Ministry of Cooperatives discovered it had been tainted by coliform bacteria and mould. Farmers in 2015 said that a Foodstar factory in the Khlong Chinda subdistrict of Sam Phran district in Nakhon Pathom province had discharged wastewater, resulting in rancid smells and ruining their products. After four months of Foodstar's not resolving the problem, the farmers demonstrated at the factory. They obstructed the entrance and exit, held signs, shouted through loudspeakers, and used a bulldozer to barricade the road. Foodstar said that a construction firm it had contracted to enlarge the factory in April had pumped water into the canal after there had been a downpour but that the current polluted water did not originate from the factory.

Fruit juice made up ฿12.5 billion (US$390,869,293) of Thailand's economy in 2015, and the economy juice sector made up 40.3% of that. Taking 16.8% of the economy juice sector, Foodstar's DeeDo fruit juice brand ranked second behind the Minute Maid Pulpy owned by The Coca-Cola Company. Foodstar's revenue was ฿3 billion (US$93,808,630) in 2017 and between 35% and 40% of its revenue came from exports. Around 2018, the company upgraded its equipment to reduce manufacturing expenses. The new machinery could assemble 600 bottles per minute up from 200 per minute. After the COVID-19 pandemic began, the company experienced a drop in sales since customers experienced more financial challenges.

Foodstar has 15 distribution centers in Thailand. Centers are located in the provinces of Chanthaburi, Chiang Mai, Chumphon, Khon Kaen, Nakhon Pathom, Nakhon Ratchasima, Nakhon Sawan, Phitsanulok, Prachuap Khiri Khan, Songkhla, Suphan Buri, Surat Thani, Ubon Ratchathani, and Udon Thani, as well as in Bangkok at Rom Klao Road. The distribution centers each cost about ฿200 million (US$6,253,909) to build. The company has a 120-rai (190,000 m^{2}; 2,100,000 ft^{2}) factory in the Sam Phran district of the Nakhon Pathom province. To upgrade the equipment at its factory, Foodstar spent between ฿200 million (US$6,253,909) and ฿300 million (US$9,380,863) in 2022. The purpose was to prepare the company for increased local and foreign sales of its products. The company's goods could be purchased in 20 countries in 2023 including China, India, the Philippines, and the United States. Foodstar that year had revenue of ฿800 million (US$25,015,635).

== Products ==
Foodstar's products are economy and super-economy goods, meaning they operate in the lower-priced market. Foodstar's primary product is DeeDo, a brand of fruit juice that it produces and distributes. Aiming to attract new customers, it expanded the products it makes, also selling yoghurt drinks, ice pops, and jelly. Its yogurt brand is called Mikku and includes the flavors blueberry and orange. Targeting customers who were entering the job market, Foodstar in 2015 started selling herbal teas with the flavors chrysanthemum, roselle, and tamarind. The next year, they released the brand Fruitku, a fruit juice containing coconut gel. Foodstar in 2021 launched DeeDo Max C, a more premium beverage product. The drink had double the amount of orange juice as the original product and 200% vitamin C. It was sold in three citrus flavors: mandarin orange, yuzu, and calamansi. The company planned to add candy such as gummy candy to the products it sells.

A substantial portion of the people who consume Foodstar products are children and teenagers. Foodstar's leaders were worried that sales of the company's products would drop owing to teenagers' focus on fitness, Thailand's aging population, and sugary drink taxes. They planned to create new products to cater to consumers' desire for healthier food and beverage options.

== Marketing ==
More beverage competitors started to enter the market roughly eight years after the Foodstar brand DeeDo began being sold in 1995. To distinguish itself from other brands, Foodstar started investing in television advertisements, posting its first in 2006. Its early ads aired on animated cartoon channels. Foodstar subsequently began celebrity branding campaigns, partnering with actors who performed on the most popular drama series. They hired the actor Tasit Sinkanawiwat, who started endorsing their products in advertisements in 2008. During their 20th anniversary year in 2013, Foodstar invested more than ฿100 million (US$3,126,954) on marketing, hiring Saranyu Winaipanit to promote their products including in a commercial. Focusing their marketing on teenagers, the company sponsored DeeDo High School Band, a 13-week television show on Channel 3's Channel 3 Family. The program aired on Saturdays between May and August 2015 and allowed students in matthayom 1–6 to compete. The company invested ฿200 million (US$6,253,909) on marketing in 2016, spending ฿100 million (US$3,126,954) on creating a commercial with the singer Jannine Weigel with the theme "because we belong together". Aiming to attract teenagers who lived in cities, Foodstar modernized its products' packaging. The company changed the shape of its bottles from square to round. It secured a license to feature characters from the manga series Doraemon on its products.

In 2017, Foodstar spent ฿200 million (US$6,253,909) on creating a television advertisement starring the actor Mario Maurer. Aiming to promote its products in ASEAN countries, the company aired the Maurer commercial in Cambodia, Laos, Myanmar, Thailand, and Vietnam. The ad's theme was "passing on freshness ... satisfaction anywhere, everywhere". Foodstar partnered with the Burmese actor Aung Ye Lin to promote its products in Myanmar, where the company held a sweepstake containing prizes like the iPhone 6 and cash prizes. The actor Chanon Santinatornkul was recruited as brand sponsor in 2019, aiming to interest youth in their products. After launching the more premium drink DeeDo Max C, Foodstar hired the actress Supassra Thanachat to promote the product to youths.

For its 30th anniversary year, Foodstar allocated ฿200 million (US$6,253,909) to spend on marketing. Aiming to attract younger customers, the company spent some of the money in 2023 to redesign the packing and logo of Deedo and other offerings to look better and be more contemporary. Another portion of the funds was spent on a "lucky draw". Foodstar signed partnerships with the singers Ble Patumrach R-Siam and Phuwasit Ananphonsiri to sponsor and advertise DeeDo.
