= Nakhon Pathom =

Nakhon Pathom นครปฐม
- City Municipality
- City of Nakhon Pathom เทศบาลนครนครปฐม
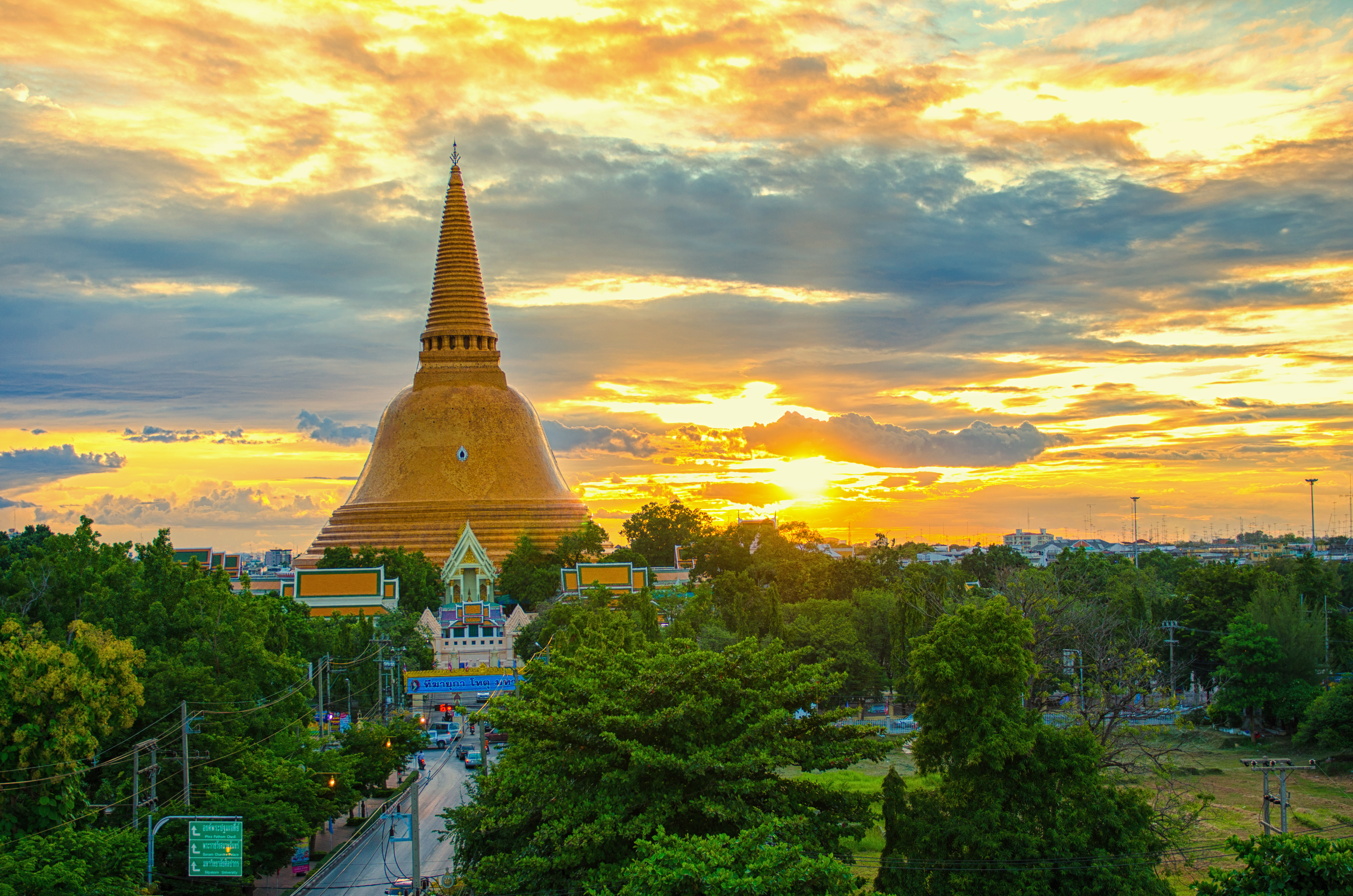
- Phra Pathommachedi

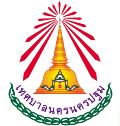
- Seal

- Location in Bangkok Metropolitan Region Location in Thailand
- Coordinates: 13°49′14″N 100°03′45″E
- Country: Thailand
- Province: Nakhon Pathom
- District: Mueang Nakhon Pathom

Government
  - Type: City Municipality
  - Mayor: Ekaphan Kuptawat

Area
  - Total: 19.85 km^{2} (7.66 sq mi)

Population (2000)
  - Total: 120,657
- Time zone: UTC+7 (ICT)
- Area code: (+66) 34
- Website: nakhonpathomcity.go.th

Nakhon Pathom (Thai: นครปฐม, pronounced [náʔkʰɔ̄ːn pā.tʰǒm]) is a city (thesaban nakhon) in central Thailand, the capital of Nakhon Pathom province. One of the most important landmarks is the giant Phra Pathommachedi. The city is also home to Thailand's only Bhikkhuni temple Wat Song Thammakanlayani (วัดทรงธรรมกัลยาณี), which is also open to women from abroad.

Nakhon Pathom houses a campus of Silpakorn University within the former Sanam Chandra Palace.

The city is 57 km west of Bangkok.

According to Charles Higham, "Two silver medallions from beneath a sanctuary at Nakhon Pathom, the largest of the moated sites, proclaim that it was 'the meritorious work of the King of Sri Dvaravati', the Sanskrit term Dvaravati meaning 'that which has gates'. The script is in south Indian characters of the seventh century." Nakhon Pathom was the largest Dvaravati center.

== History ==
Nakhon Pathom was located in the Gulf of Thailand 2000 years ago, but is steadily receding southward as a result of sedimentation. Nakhon Pathom, along with Ratchaburi and Sing Buri, is considered one of the oldest cities in Thailand, having been founded as far back as 40 BC. It was for a long time one of the important capitals of Dvaravati, a prestigious Mon kingdom from Lop Buri to ex Tun Sun area. The Indian King Ashoka sent monks to Siam at this time to popularize Theravada Buddhism. They arrived in Nakhon Pathom and from there toured the country. Hence the city's self-image of having spread Buddhism throughout Siam.

In April 1842, trouble broke out between three groups of Chinese who had formed secret societies, each with about 1,000 men. The leaders of these groups were named Khim, Ia and Phiao (Piaw). The Siamese government sent soldiers under the command of Phra Sombat Wanit to arrest the leaders. In fact, Khim and Phiao were the first to be thrown into the dungeon, but Ia managed to escape. He then robbed the houses in the Samut Sakhon and Nakhon Pathom area along with his people. They could only be overpowered after a large police operation.

In the 1930s, Nakhon Pathom was a nest of 300 houses and about 12. Buddhist temples. There was also the famous monks' retreat at Bang Thammasala.

== Geography ==
Nakhon Pathom is located about 50 kilometers west of Thailand's capital, Bangkok, in the middle of a wide plain, crossed by watercourses, such as the Mae Nam Tha Chin (Tha Chin River). Sugar cane has been grown here since the late 18th century. Old travel reports describe that near Nakhon Pathom on the Tha Chin, there were sugar factories every four to five kilometers, surrounded by some ten to fifteen houses and firmly in Chinese hands.

== Places of interest ==
- Phra Pathom Chedi (พระปฐมเจดีย,) - considered the tallest Buddhist structure in the world, it is about 127 meters high, rediscovered by King Mongkut (Rama IV) during his time as a wandering monk in the jungle (restored since 1853) and covered with fine Chinese tiles at the behest of his son Chulalongkorn (Rama V).
- Phra Ruang Rochanarit - Standing Buddha about eight meters high in the north chapel.
- New museum at the south entrance of the temple complex, displaying mainly Dvaravati period artifacts found during construction work on the chedi and in the surrounding excavations, as well as Mon-style Buddha statues.
- Wat Phra Praton Praton Chedi (พระประโทณเจดีย์): small, quiet temple with an ancient Khmer prang and a small but popular shrine to the heroes of a legend Phya Khong and his foster mother Yai Hom.
- Wat Songdhammakalyani- (วัดทรงธรรมกัลยาณี) - Thailand's only Bhikkhuni temple, open also to interested Western women.
- Sanam Chandra Palace - King Vajiravudh's palace complex in the west of the city. The complex now houses the Sanam Chan Palace Campus of Silpakorn University.

== Gallery ==
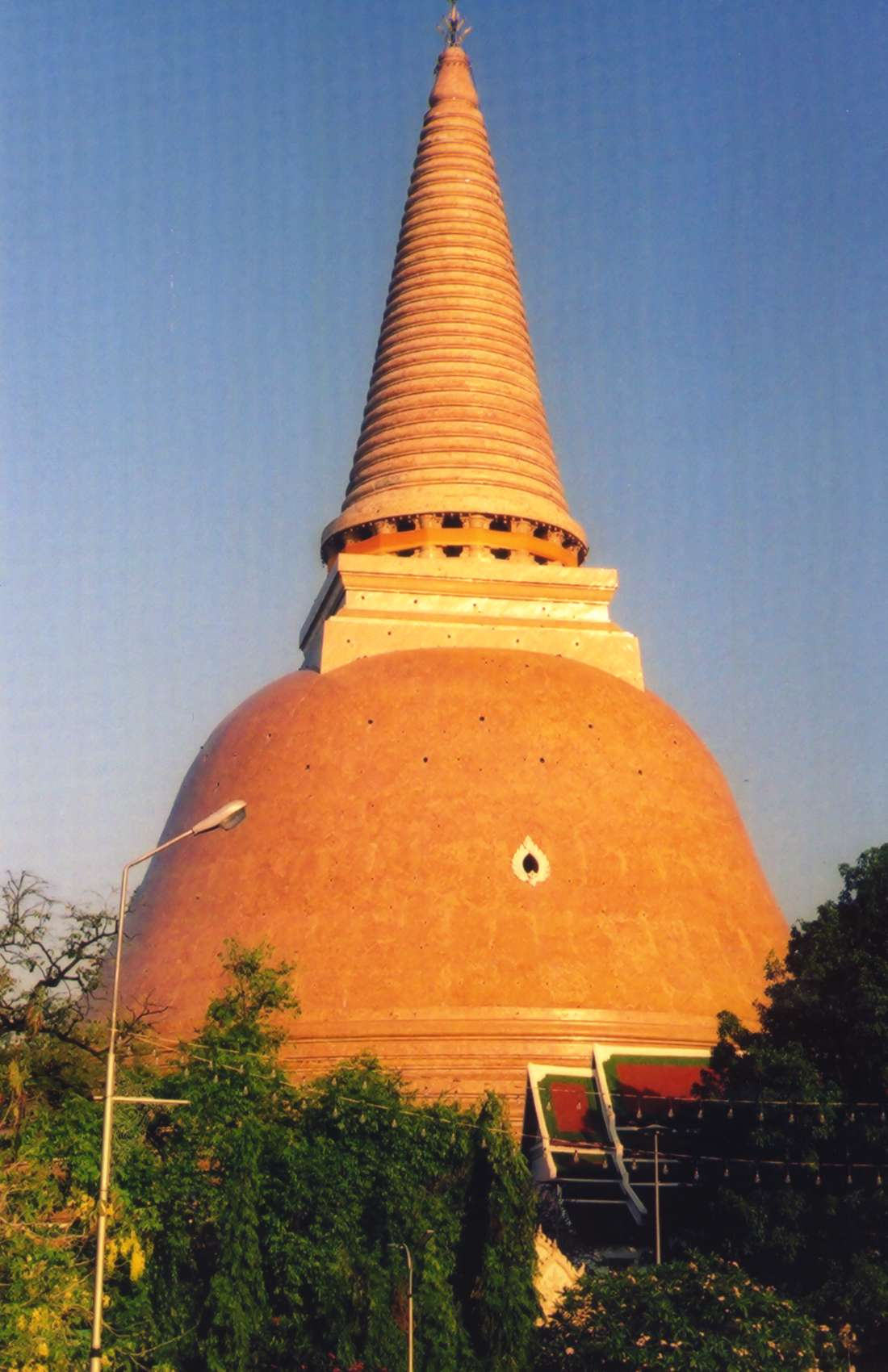
Phra Pathommachedi

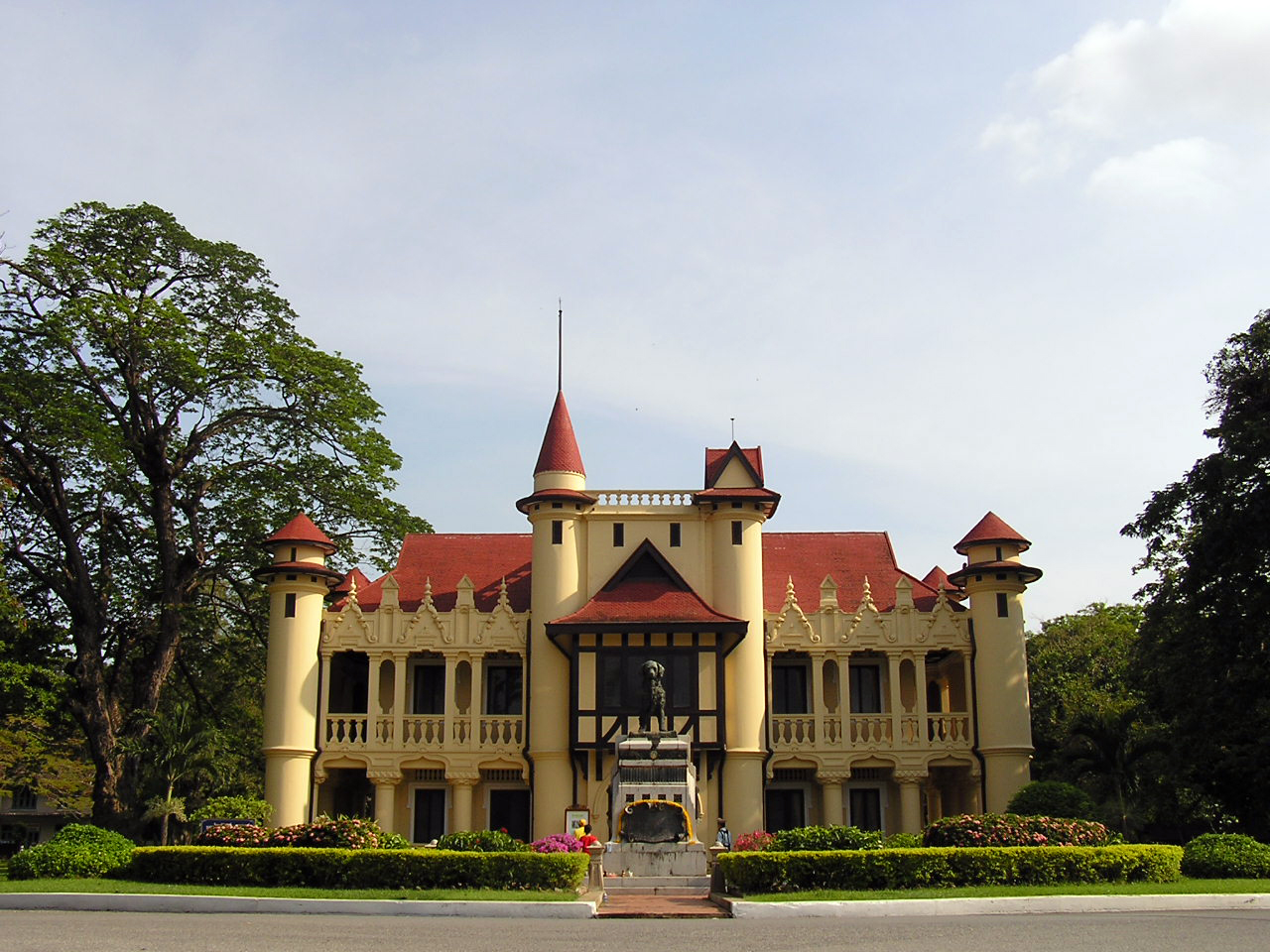
Sanam Chandra Palace

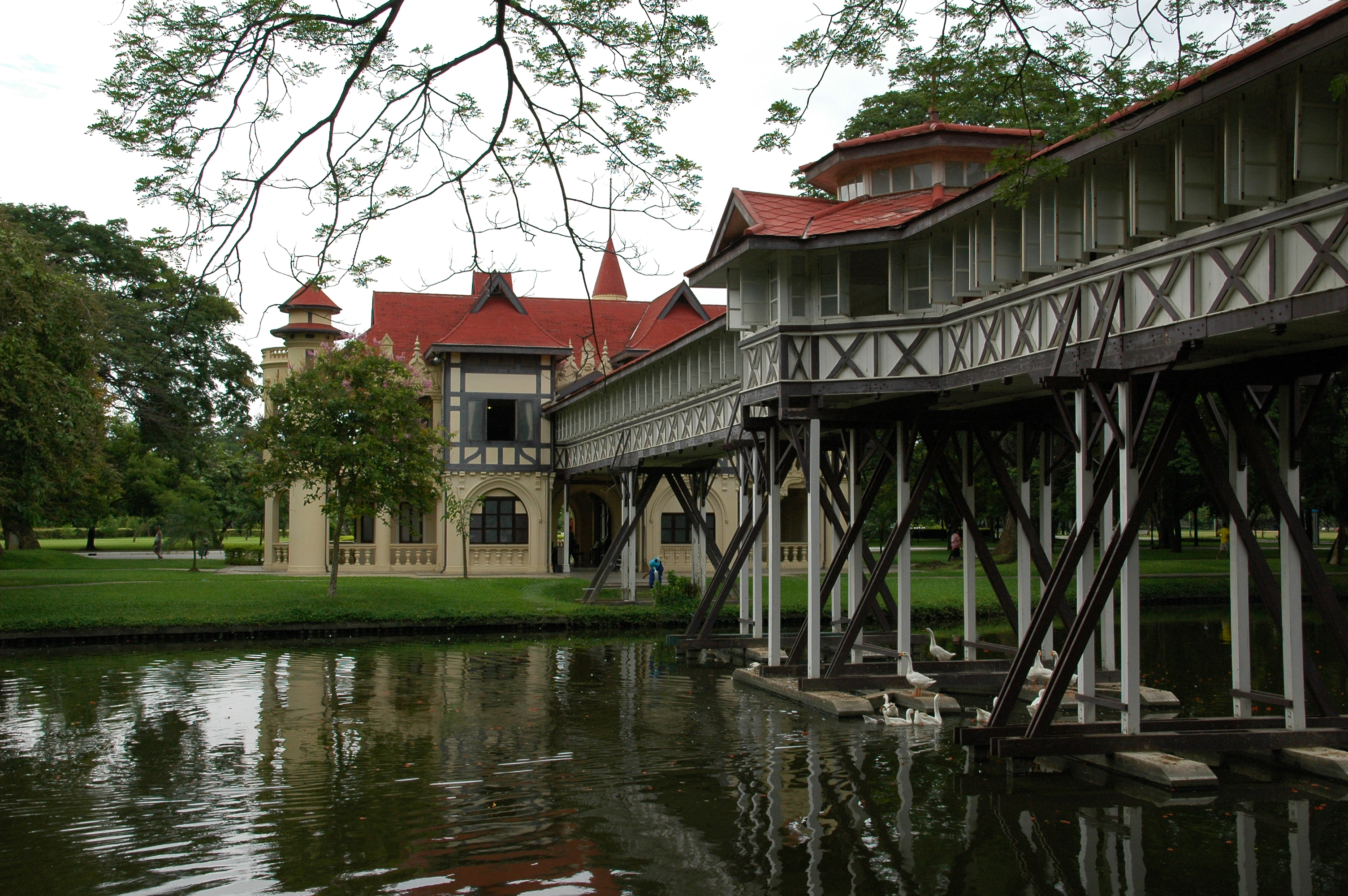
Sanam Chandra Palace

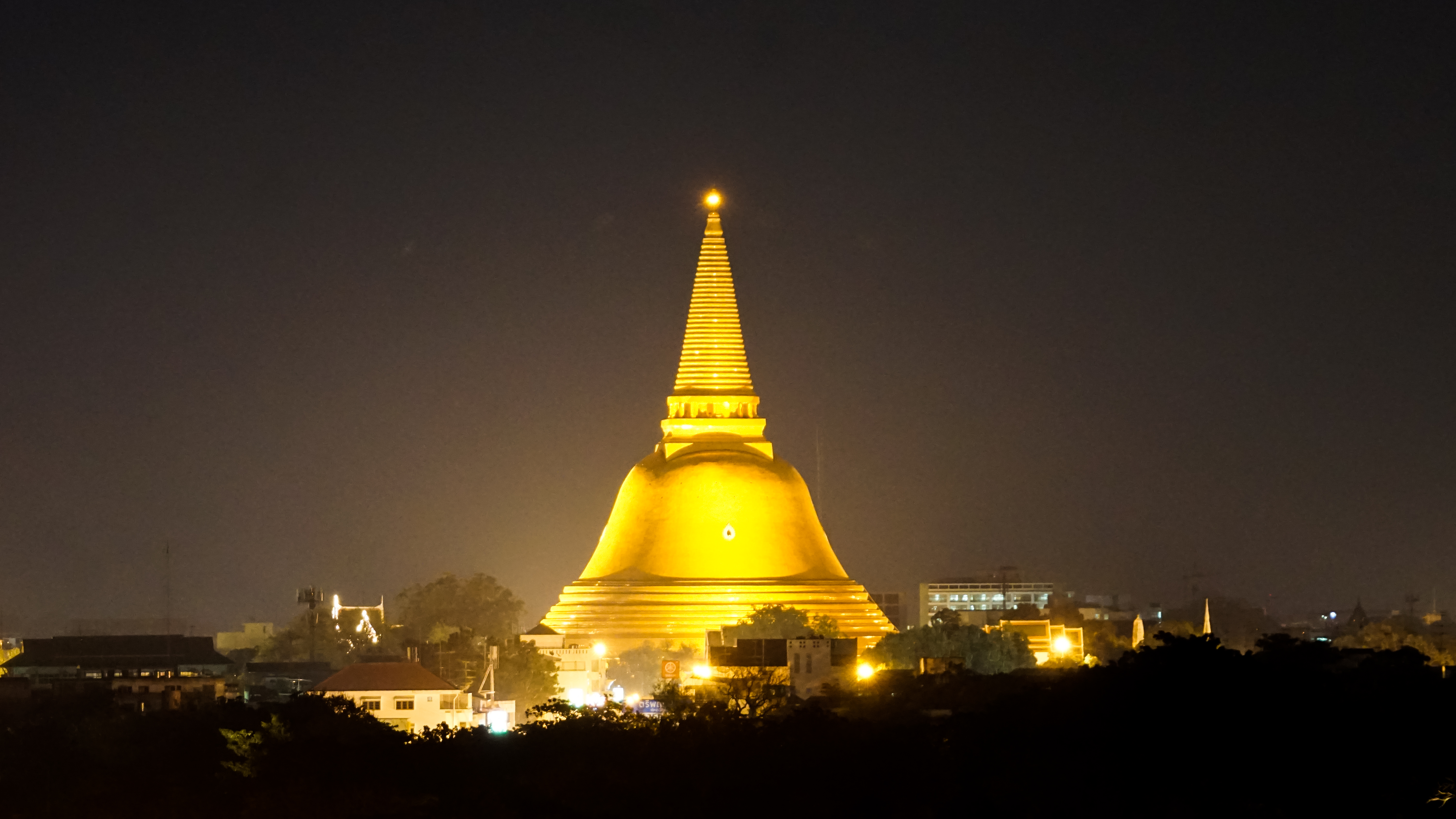
Phra Pathommachedi

== See also ==
- Phra Pathommachedi
- Samphran Elephant Ground & Zoo
