= Wat Rai Khing =

Buddhist temple in Nakhon Pathom province, Thailand

Coordinates: 13°44′33″N 100°15′30.96″E

- วัดไร่ขิงพระอารามหลวง
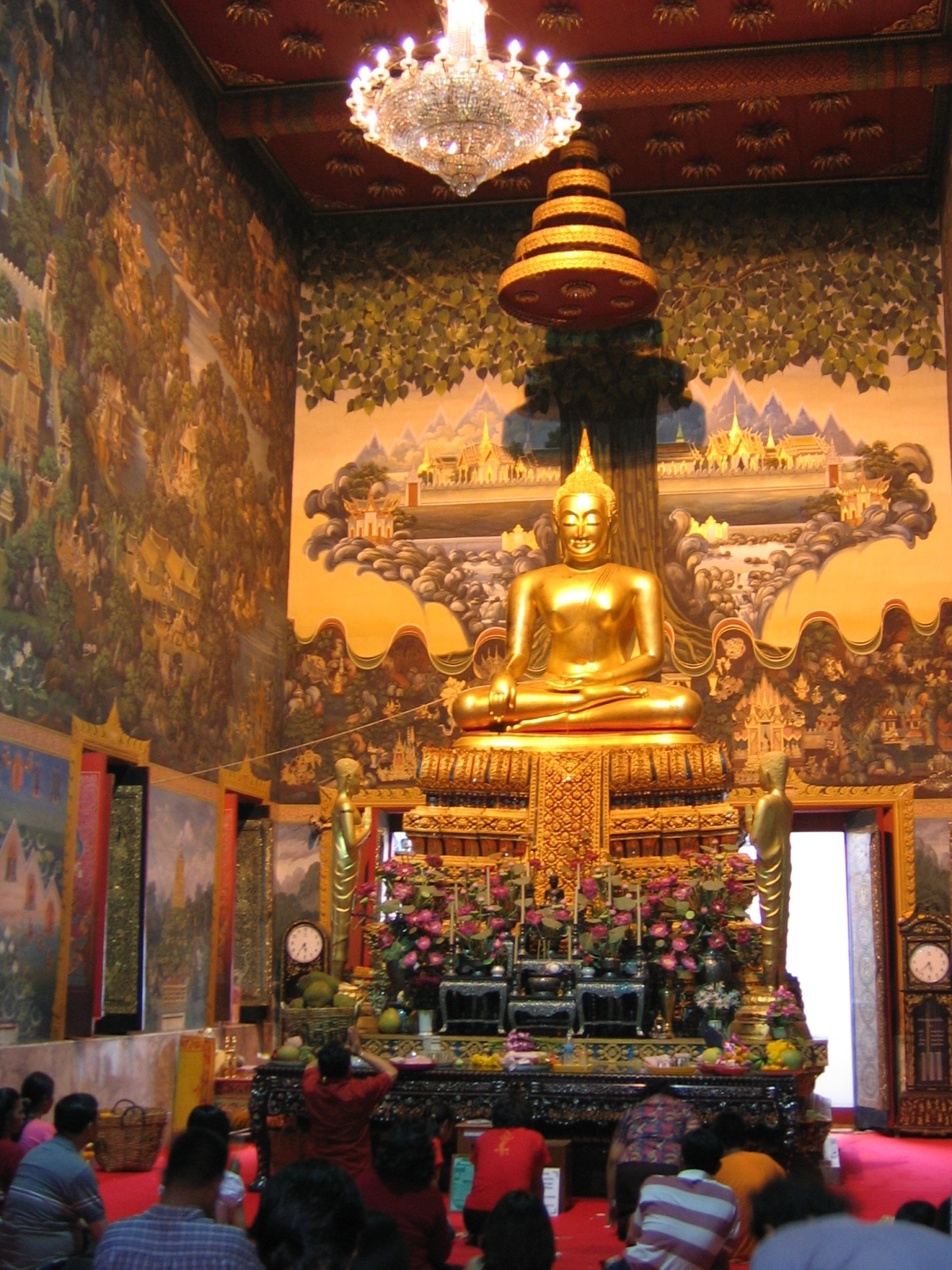
- Luang Por Wat Rai Khing

Religion
- District: Rai Khing, Sam Phran
- Province: Nakhon Pathom

Location
- Interactive map of Wat Rai Khing

Wat Rai Khing (Thai: วัดไร่ขิง, pronounced [wát râj kʰǐŋ]; lit. 'temple on ginger farm') is another prominent and notable temple in Nakhon Pathom province in addition to Wat Phra Pathom Chedi, which is the provincial temple. Wat Rai Khing is located along the Tha Chin River (known locally as Nakhon Chai Si River), Tambon Rai Khing, Sam Phran district on Petchkasem Road, west of Bangkok. And not far from other attractions such as Sampran Riverside (Rose Garden), Samphran Elephant Ground & Zoo etc.

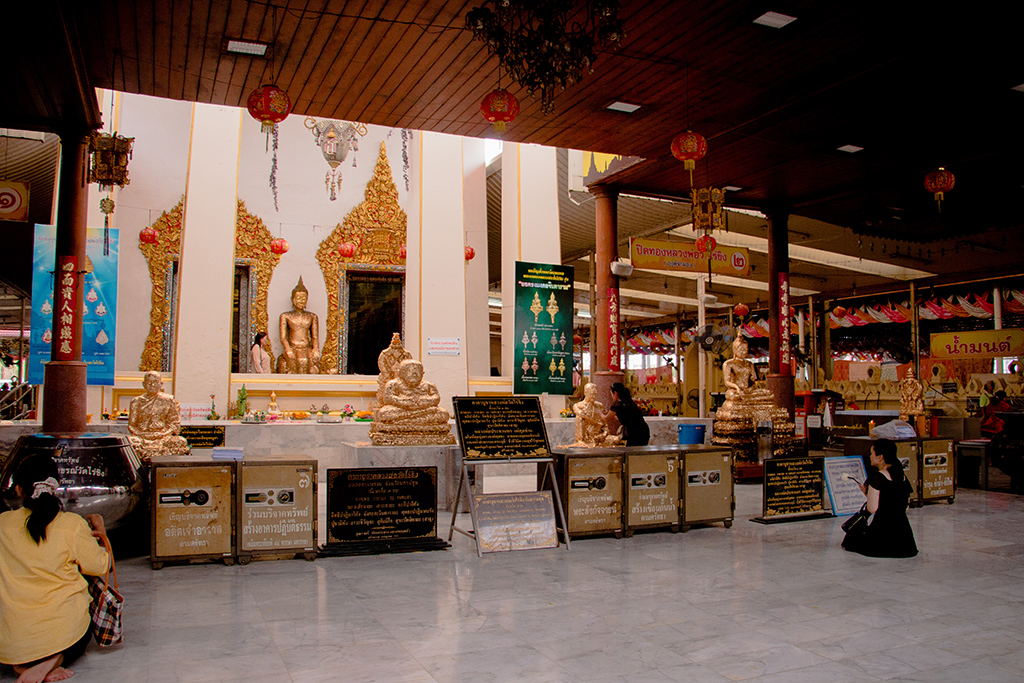
Front of the main hall

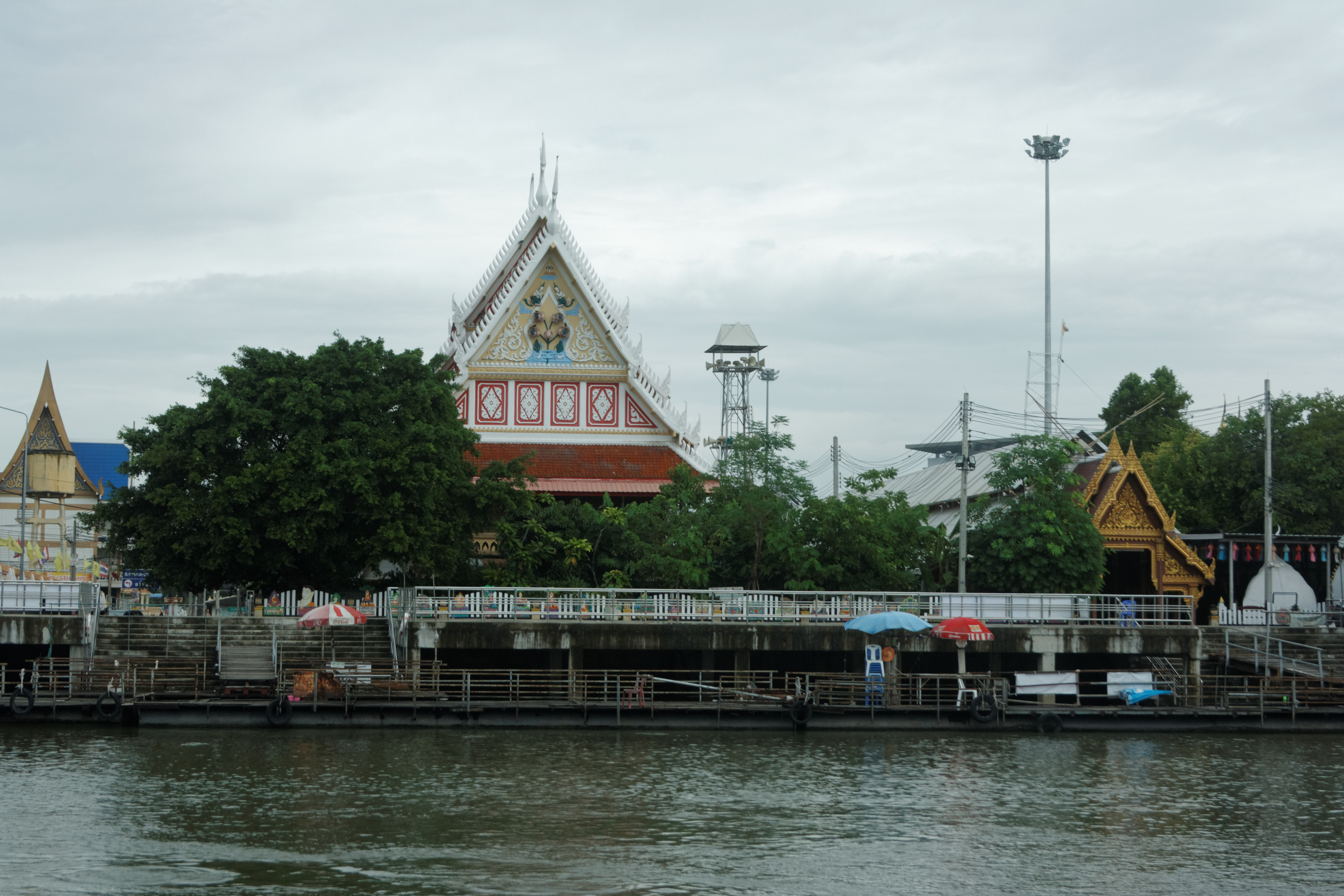
The temple as seen from the opposite side of Tha Chin River

It is a civilian monastery built in 1791 (reign of King Rama IV). Somdej Phra Phuttha Chan (Pook), who was a Sam Phran people named this temple after the tambon (subdistrict). When construction was completed, the Buddha image was brought from Wat Sala Poon and enshrined here, later the locals named the image Luang Por Wat Rai Khing (หลวงพ่อวัดไร่ขิง). The Buddha image is in the attitude of Buddha Subduing Mara. The Buddha image is of Chiang Saen style and is assumed to have been built by Lanna Thai and Lan Xang craftsmen. According to legend, this Buddha image was found floating in the river, along with four other Buddha images, namely Luang Por Sothon (หลวงพ่อโสธร) of Wat Sothonwararam in Chachoengsao, Luang Por Ban Laem (หลวงพ่อบ้านแหลม) of Wat Ban Laem in Samut Songkhram, Luang Por To (หลวงพ่อโต) of Wat Bang Phli Yai Nai in Bang Phli, Samut Prakan and Luang Por Thong (หลวงพ่อทอง; also known as Luang Por Wat Khao Takrao–หลวงพ่อวัดเขาตะเครา) of Wat Khao Takrao in Ban Laem, Phetchaburi all of which are the principal Buddha images in the prominent temples of all central basin. Therefore, believed that all five were brothers.

Prince Vajirananavarorasa granted temple the name of Wat Mongkol Chinda Ram (วัดมงคลจินดาราม; with the words Rai Khing in parentheses after the name) but the locals call the temple Wat Mongkol Chinda Ram Rai Khing, later it was shorten to Wat Rai Khing. The temple is well known among Thais, faithful Buddhists frequently pay a visit to Wat Rai Khing to pay homage to the sacred Buddha image. Every Saturdays and Sundays, food and fruits are sold in front of the temple. This temple is also renowned for its natural fish sanctuary, a habitat of hundreds of thousands of iridescent shark (Pangasianodon hypophthalmus) and black-spotted catfish (Pangasius larnaudii). Visitors can buy bread or fish food here to feed these fish. Also, the temple pier is home to a delicious spicy tom yum noodles soup restaurant.

Moreover, visitors can travel to the Wat Don Wai Floating Market, another famous floating market which is a source of various Thai food of the province, not far from here by taking Tha Chin River cruise (fare 60 baht/round trip) and can also see the scenery on both sides of the river and the way of life of the locals as well.
