= Nong Khaem subdistrict, Bangkok =

Nong Khaem หนองแขม
- Khwaeng
- Etymology: Reed Marsh
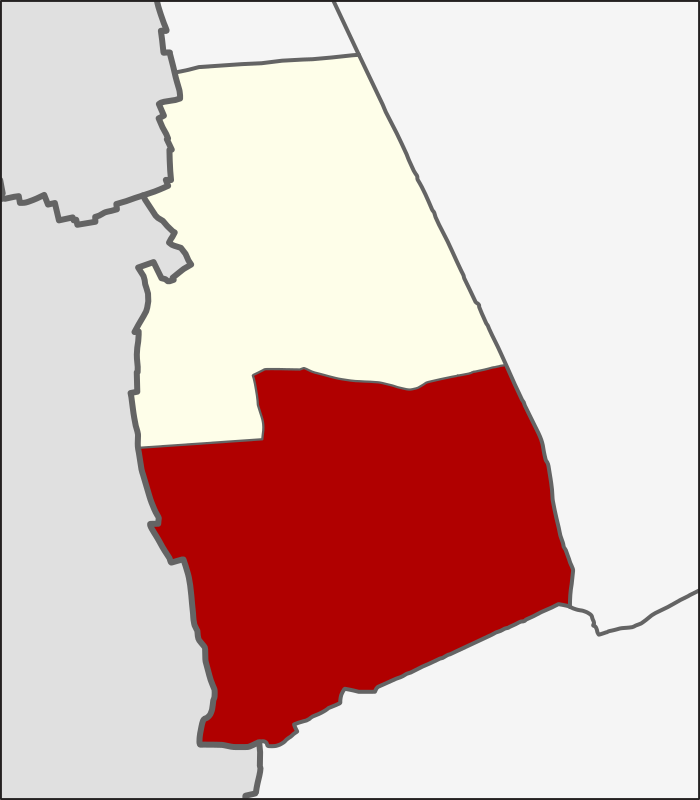
- Location in Nong Khaem district
- Country: Thailand
- Province: Bangkok
- Khet: Nong Khaem

Area
  - Total: 18.789 km^{2} (7.254 sq mi)

Population (2021)
  - Total: 80,179
  - Density: 4,267.34/km^{2} (11,052.4/sq mi)
- Time zone: UTC+7 (ICT)
- Postal code: 10160
- TIS 1099: 102302

Nong Khaem (Thai: หนองแขม, pronounced [nɔ̌ːŋ kʰɛ̌ːm]) is a khwaeng (subdistrict) of Nong Khaem District, in Bangkok, Thailand.

== History and naming ==
Situated at the western edge of Bangkok, Nong Khaem borders provinces of Samut Sakhon and Nakhon Pathom and is known for a number of agriculture projects like white champaca and orchid breeding include chital deer farming. In 1870 a temple was built here next a nong (marsh) that was thick with khaem (Saccharum arundinaceum, a type of reed), which became the name of both the temple and, much later, the administrative district.

During that time, the administrative centre of Nong Khaem was here. Along the Khlong Phasi Charoen canal, the district office and the police station were located.

== Geography ==
As a khwaeng, Nong Khaem is lower part of the district. The upper part of the area is a low-density residential area. The lower part is an agricultural area.

== Population ==
In late 2021, it had a population of 80,179 people.
