= Don Wai Market =

Coordinates: 13°46′18.2352″N 100°17′2.1588″E

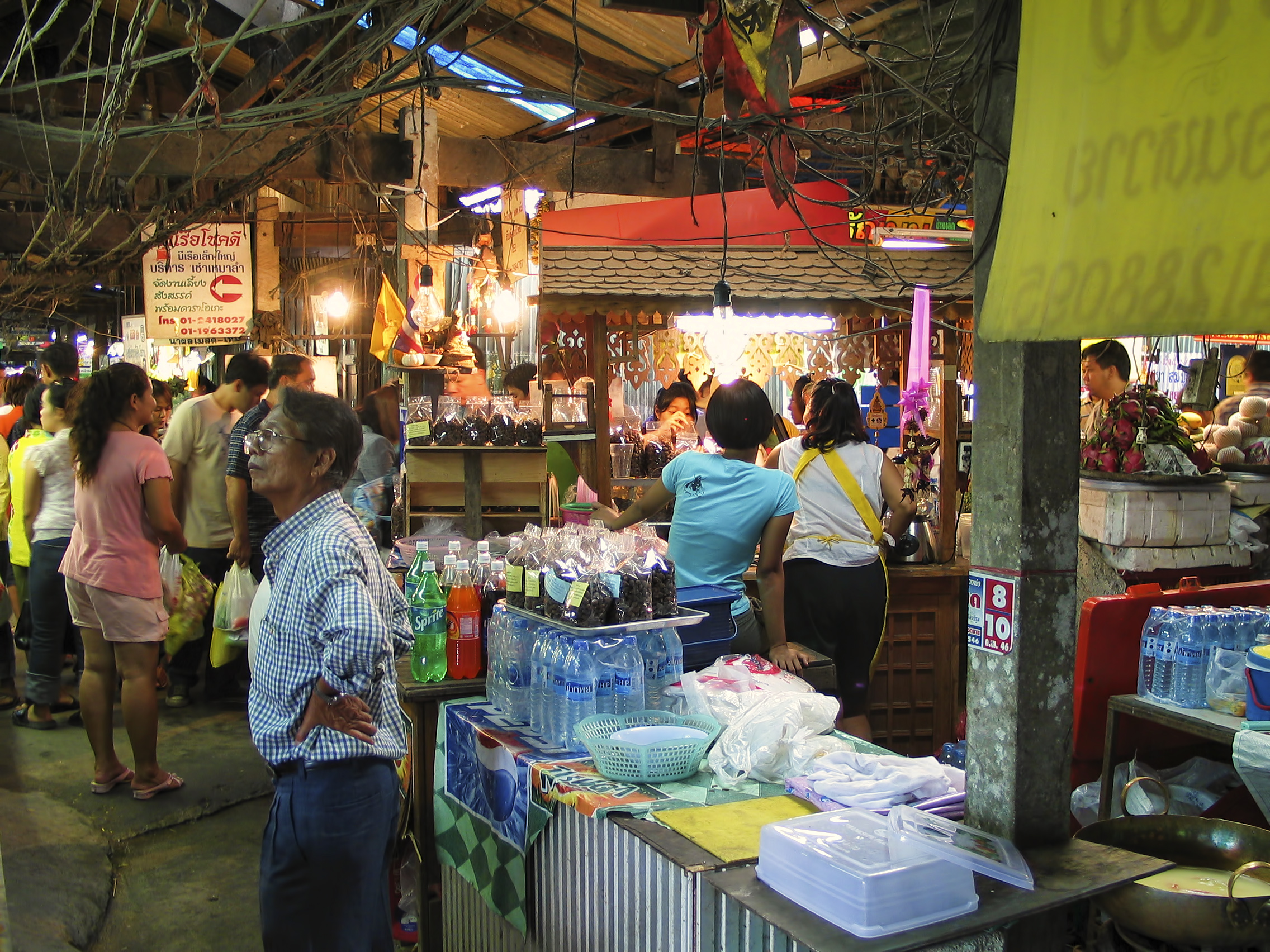
Don Wai Market

Don Wai Market (Thai: ตลาดน้ำวัดดอนหวาย, ตลาดน้ำดอนหวาย, lit. "(Wat) Don Wai Water Market", but sometimes translated as "floating market") Is a riverside market in Nakhon Pathom Province, Thailand. It is located along the Tha Chin River, behind Wat Don Wai in Bang Krathuek Subdistrict, Sam Phran District.

This market is a community of locals that is a long walk into the inner. The two sides of the way are old wooden shophouses lined along the riverbank dated back to the reign of King Rama VI. It is a very busy market especially on weekends. It has many products for sale to visitors many are local produce or fruit obtained from planting in the area. However, the most famous thing at the market is the variety of food, such as tom yum noodles soup, fried fishcake or fish balls, beef and pork barbecue, pork satay, nam prik, stewed Java barb in salty soup, Chinese sausage, Thai sweets, coconut milk ice cream and notable Chinese stewed duck, which has two shops that are both old and famous.

Don Wai Market is located near Wat Rai Khing, another famous tourist destination of Nakhon Pathom with a cruise for about 20 minutes. Visitors can cruise between these two locations with a fare of 60 baht per person (round trip). Moreover, from here, visitors can also take a cruise to see the way of life of locals on both sides of Tha Chin River (fare is 100 baht each, approx. one hours).
