= Nong Khang Phlu =

Nong Khang Phlu หนองค้างพลู
- Khwaeng
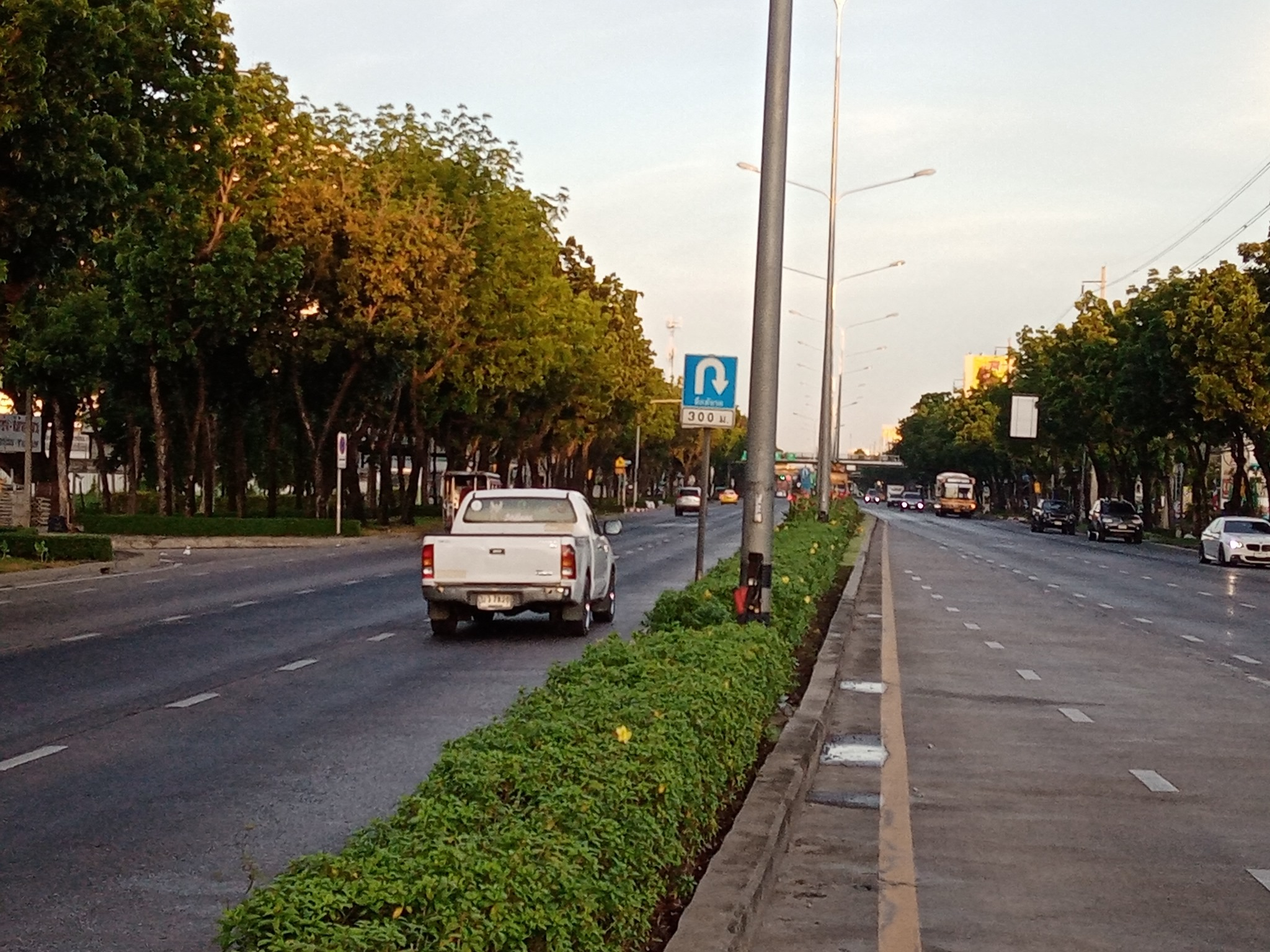
- Phet Kasem Road (Highway 4) in the area of Nong Khang Phlu

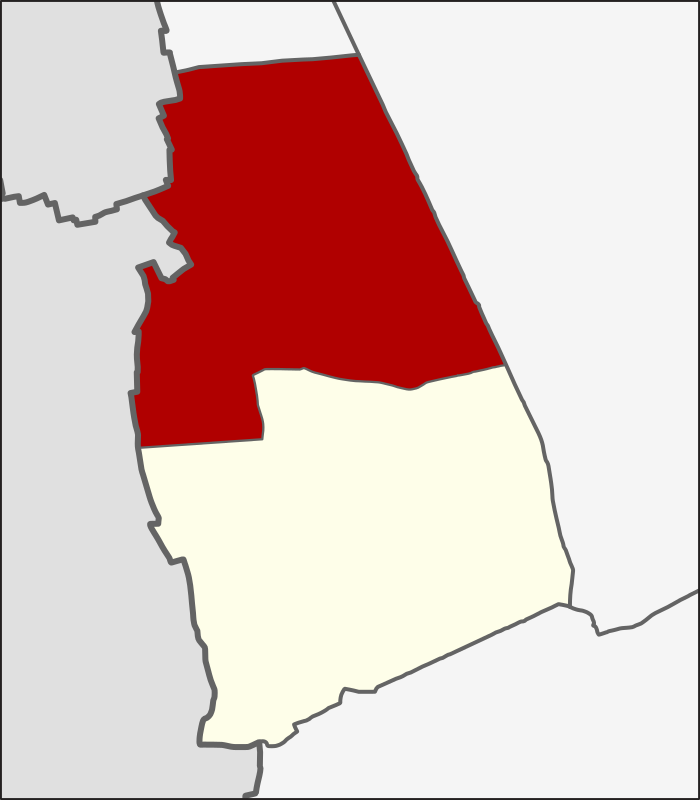
- Location in Nong Khaem District
- Coordinates: 13°42′27.7″N 100°22′22.4″E
- Country: Thailand
- Province: Bangkok
- Khet: Nong Khaem

Area
  - Total: 17.036 km^{2} (6.578 sq mi)

Population (2020)
  - Total: 75,725
- Time zone: UTC+7 (ICT)
- Postal code: 10160
- TIS 1099: 102303

Nong Khang Phlu (Thai: หนองค้างพลู, pronounced [nɔ̌ːŋ kʰáːŋ pʰlūː]) is a khwaeng (subdistrict) of Nong Khaem District, in Bangkok, Thailand. In 2020, it had a total population of 75,725 people.
