= Sam Phran district =

Sam Phran สามพราน
- District
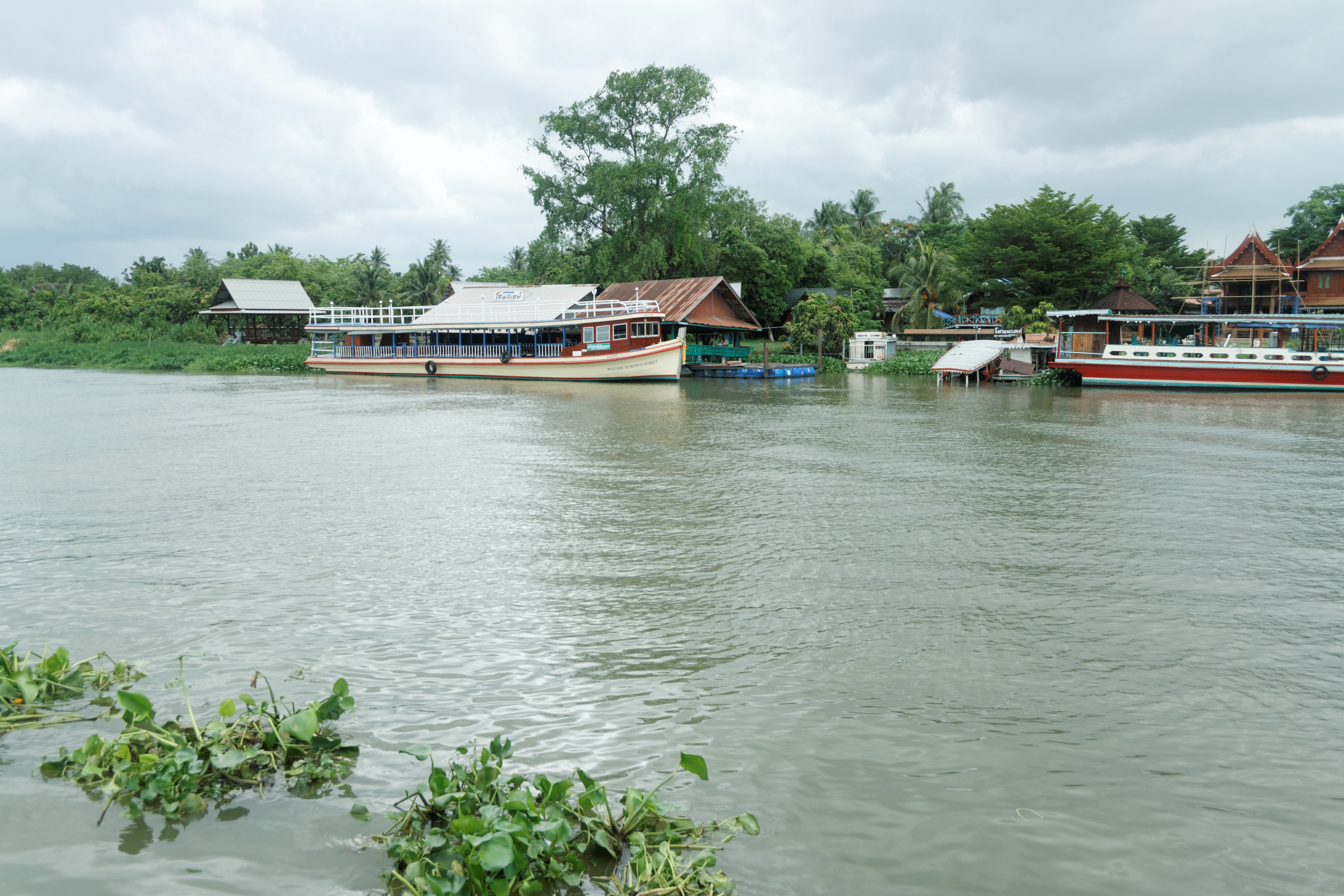
- Tha Chin river in the area of Don Wai floating market

- District location in Nakhon Pathom province
- Coordinates: 13°43′27″N 100°13′0″E
- Country: Thailand
- Province: Nakhon Pathom
- Seat: Sam Phran

Area
  - Total: 249.347 km^{2} (96.273 sq mi)

Population (2017)
  - Total: 208,836
  - Density: 837.53/km^{2} (2,169.2/sq mi)
- Time zone: UTC+7 (ICT)
- Postal code: 73110
- Geocode: 7306

Sam Phran (Thai: สามพราน, pronounced [sǎːm pʰrāːn]) is the southernmost district (amphoe) of Nakhon Pathom province, Thailand.

== History ==
The district was established in 1896, then named Talat Mai District. It was renamed Sam Phran in 1917.

The name Sam Phran, meaning 'three hunters', refers to the three hunters according to local folklore about the construction of Phra Pathom Chedi.

The district was the site of the Kader Toy Factory fire in 1993, the worst industrial factory fire in history. The factory was owned by the Charoen Pokphand (CP) Group, a Thai transnational corporation and one of Asia's largest agribusiness firms.

== Geography ==
The district is elongated in an east-west direction and neighbouring districts are (from the north clockwise) Mueang Nakhon Pathom, Nakhon Chai Si, and Phutthamonthon of Nakhon Pathom Province, Thawi Watthana district and Nong Khaem of Bangkok, Krathum Baen and Ban Phaeo of Samut Sakhon province, and Bang Phae of Ratchaburi province.

The main water resource of the district is the large Tha Chin River or Nakhon Chai Si River which meanders through the district in a southeasterly direction.

Sam Phran district has evolved as a ribbon development of tambons (sub-districts) along Phetkasem Road, a major thoroughfare linking Bangkok with the cities of Nakhon Pathom and Kanchanaburi.

== Economy ==
The district is the site of two Wai Wai noodle factories, one each in Om Yai and Rai Khing. Foodstar, which makes the fruit juice brand DeeDo, is based in the district's Talat Chinda subdistrict.

The Tha Kham Sub-district (usually written Takham), is the centre of the Roman Catholic Christian religion in Thailand. Michael Michai Kitbunchu, Cardinal of Thailand, was born in Sam Phran and many Catholic religious institutes have their convents, monasteries, and headquarters in the area as well as Thailand's major seminary. The largest and most important installation in the Catholic enclave of Tha Kham is the campus shared by Joseph Upatham School, one of the largest combined kindergarten, primary, and secondary schools in the country. It is one of the 43 schools and colleges governed by the Education Department of Bangkok Archdiocese (EDBA). The Ban Phu Waan Pastoral Training Centre, a leading Catholic conference and convention centre is also here. There are several other large private schools in Tak Kham including St. Peter's school (mixed gender, grades K–9) also governed by the EDBA in the parish of St. Peter, and Marie Upatham, an independent Catholic school for girls in the Tha Kham village of Mor Sii.

Sam Phran is the site of the National Police Academy and numerous other colleges including St. Joseph Intertechnology College, a Catholic vocational school and teacher training centre also governed by the EDBA.

== Administration ==
The district is divided into 16 sub-districts (tambons), which are further subdivided into 137 villages (mubans). Sam Phran is a town (thesaban mueang) and Om Yai a sub-district municipality (thesaban tambon). There are a further 15 tambon administrative organizations (TAO).

No.	Name	Thai	Villages	Pop.
1.	Tha Kham	ท่าข้าม	6	9,880
2.	Song Khanong	ทรงคนอง	6	4,140
3.	Hom Kret	หอมเกร็ด	6	8,015
4.	Bang Krathuek	บางกระทึก	8	9,470
5.	Bang Toei	บางเตย	7	4,016
6.	Sam Phran	สามพราน	9	12,430
7.	Bang Chang	บางช้าง	11	7,638
8.	Rai Khing	ไร่ขิง	14	22,406
9.	Tha Talat	ท่าตลาด	10	14,848
10.	Krathum Lom	กระทุ่มล้ม	9	16,398
11.	Khlong Mai	คลองใหม่	7	11,326
12.	Talat Chinda	ตลาดจินดา	11	7,397
13.	Khlong Chinda	คลองจินดา	14	11,579
14.	Yai Cha	ยายชา	6	7,102
15.	Ban Mai	บ้านใหม่	5	9,142
16.	Om Yai	อ้อมใหญ่	8	15,775

== Places of interest ==
- Wat Rai Khing (วัดไร่ขิง), temple on the Nakhon Chai Si River (Tha Chin River)
- Rose Garden Riverside (สวนสามพราน), botanical garden
- Samphran Elephant Ground & Zoo (ลานแสดงช้างและฟาร์มจระเข้สามพราน), crocodile farm and zoo, a branch of Samutprakarn Crocodile Farm and Zoo
- Samphran Peacock Park (สวนนกยูงสามพราน), peacock park and zoo
- Royal Police Cadet Academy (โรงเรียนนายร้อยตำรวจ), Royal Thai Police (RTP) academy
- Don Wai Floating Market (ตลาดน้ำดอนหวาย), floating market
- Wat Samphran, a Buddhist temple with a tower around which is the statue of a dragon

== Notable people ==
- Chanathip "Messi-J" Songkrasin, Thai professional footballer
- Michael Michai Kitbunchu, Cardinal of Thailand
- Pallop Pinmanee, a retired Thai Army general
