= Nong Khaem district =

Nong Khaem หนองแขม
- Khet
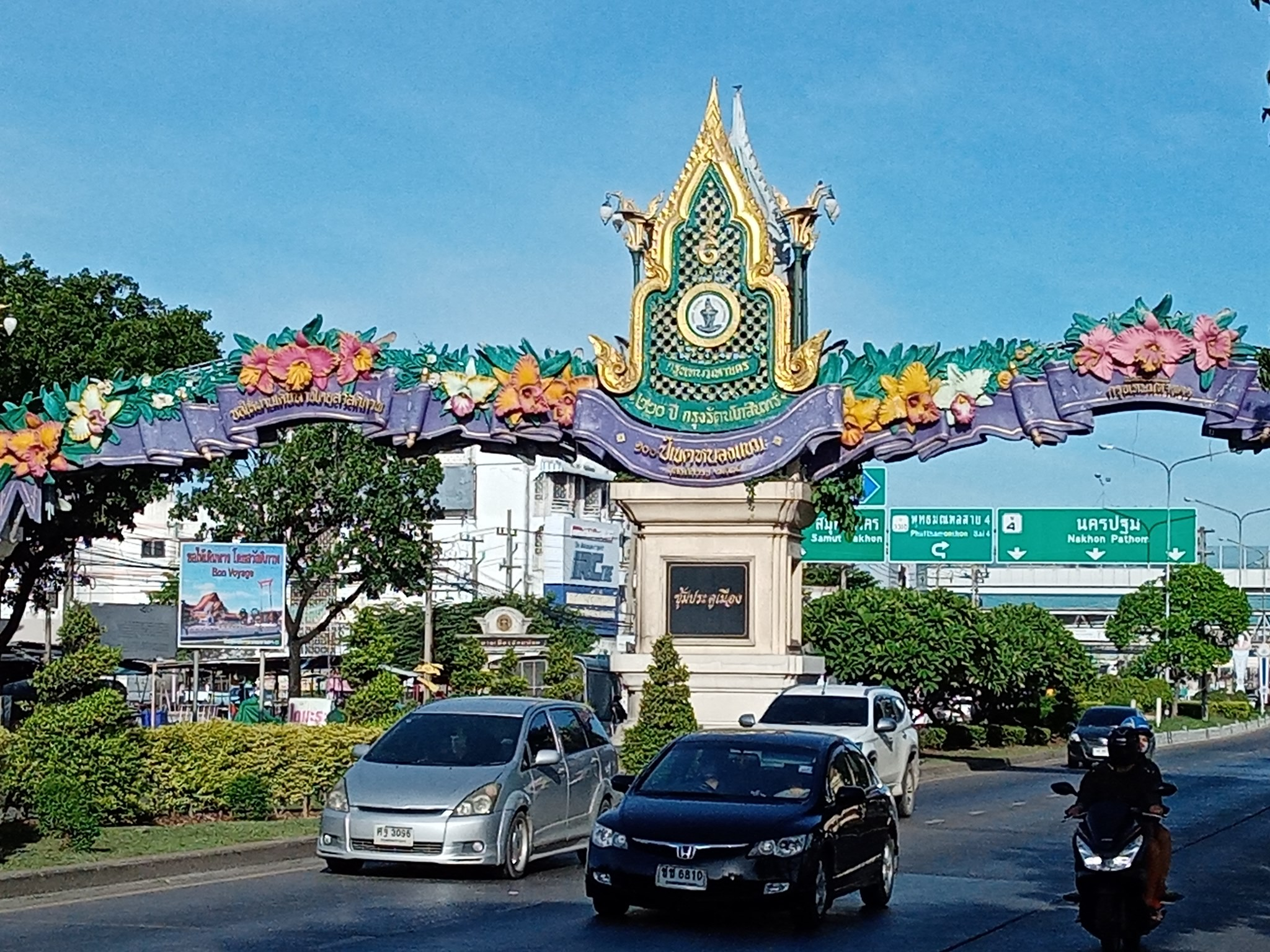
- Bangkok City Gate, Nong Khaem

- Khet location in Bangkok
- Coordinates: 13°42′17″N 100°20′56″E
- Country: Thailand
- Province: Bangkok
- Seat: Nong Khang Phlu
- Khwaeng: 2

Area
  - Total: 35.825 km^{2} (13.832 sq mi)

Population (2017)
  - Total: 155,722
  - Density: 4,346.74/km^{2} (11,258.0/sq mi)
- Time zone: UTC+7 (ICT)
- Postal code: 10160
- Geocode: 1023

Nong Khaem (Thai: หนองแขม, pronounced [nɔ̌ːŋ kʰɛ̌ːm]) is one of the 50 districts (khet) of Bangkok, Thailand. The district is bounded by other Bangkok districts (from north clockwise): Thawi Watthana, Bang Khae, Bang Bon of Bangkok, Krathum Baen of Samut Sakhon province, Sam Phran and Phutthamonthon of Nakhon Pathom province. Nong Khaem is Bangkok's westernmost district.

== History ==
Since the past, Khlong Phasi Charoen has served as an important waterway for the Nong Khaem area. The canal was constructed in 1871 during the reign of King Rama IV. As a result, many key local landmarks such as temples, communities, markets, and the police station were established along its banks.

On July 15, 1904, the royal barge passed through Nong Khaem via Khlong Phasi Charoen during low tide. While the forward escort boat carrying King Rama V's retinue reached Krathum Baen, the King's own barge was unable to proceed. His Majesty stayed near Wat Nong Khaem, which has long been a spiritual anchor for the community.

In the past, the area around Nong Khaem and its surroundings consisted mainly of rice fields and plantations. During the flood season, locals used rowing boats to reach the waterfront market at Wat Nong Khaem. As early as 4:00 a.m., boats filled the canal, selling various goods along Khlong Phasi Charoen.

The name of the district comes from nong which means 'wetland' and khaem which means 'reed' (Saccharum arundinaceum), a reedy plant, reflecting its environment in the past. It was set up as Amphoe Nong Khaem in 1902. In 1938 it became a king amphoe of Phasi Charoen for about 20 years before it was elevated to district status again. It became a khet in 1972 after Bangkok administrative reform. In 1998, the eastern part of Nong Khaem (Lak Song Sub-district) was made part of the newly established district of Khet Bang Khae.

Nong Khaem is known for its abundant plantings of canna in the centre median strip of Phet Kasem Road. The flowers stretch along nearly five kilometres of roadway. They were planted in 1977 and have since become a district landmark.

The old building of Nong Khaem Police Station more than 100 years old, located on the Khlong Phasi Charoen. Now it has been renovated into a museum and a learning centre for local culture.

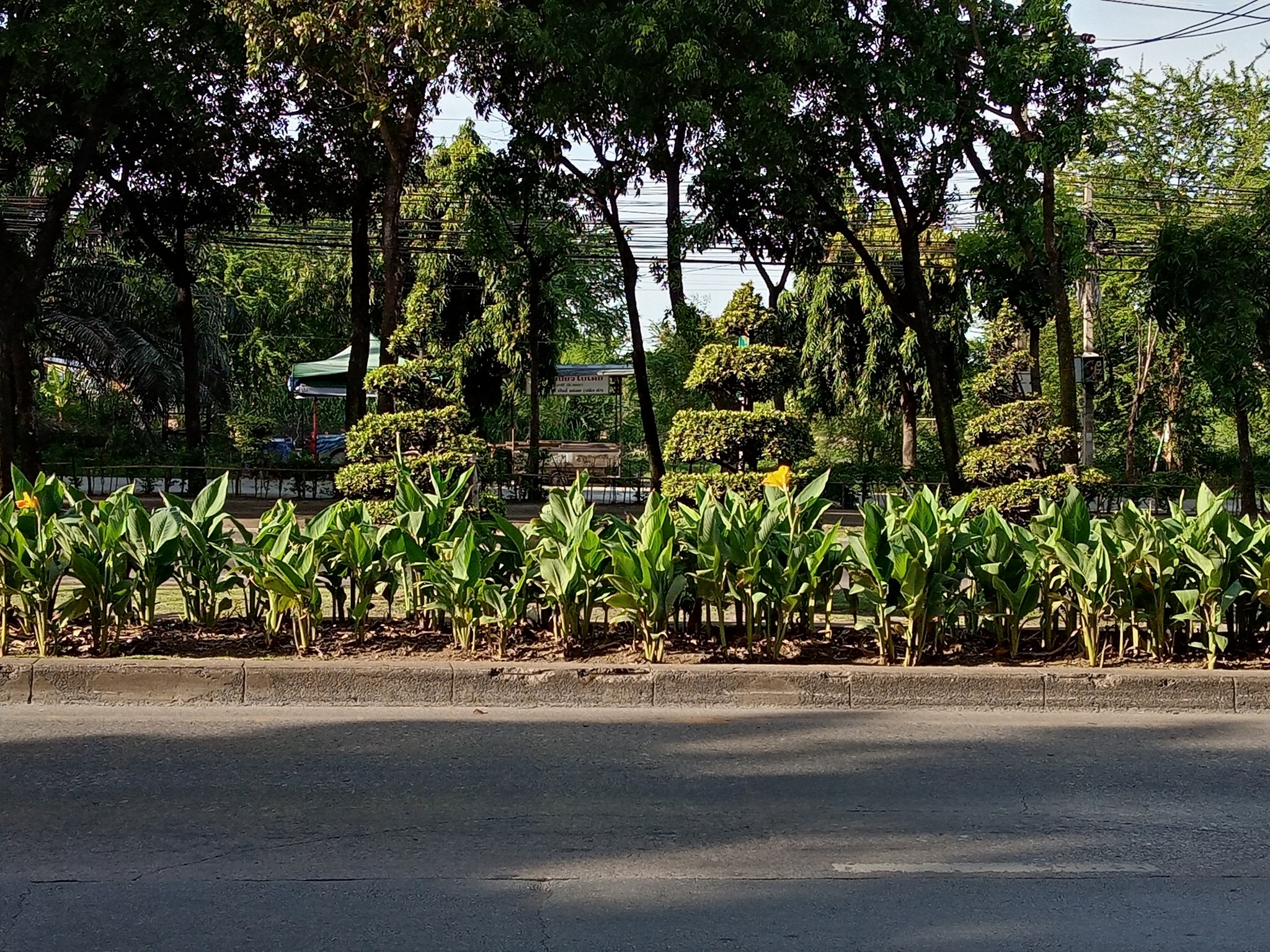
Cannas in the centre median strip of Phet Kasem Road

== Administration ==
The district is divided into two sub-districts (khwaeng).

No.	Name	Thai	Area (km^{2})	Map
2.	Nong Khaem	หนองแขม	18.789	Map
3.	Nong Khang Phlu	หนองค้างพลู	17.036	Map
Total			35.825	Map

The missing number 1 belongs to the sub-district which was split off to form Bang Khae district.

== Economy ==
Today, even though many industries and signs of prosperity have expanded into the area, Nong Khaem remains one of Bangkok's 50 districts that still has a significant amount of green space. In some parts, there are still only a few major landowners. Some of them hold as much as 180 rais (71 acres). Small-scale farmers typically rent between 10 and 20 rais (3 and 6 acres) for cultivation. Nong Khaem was once known for its extensive white champaca plantations, covering up to 1,000 rais (395 acres).

In 1973, Thai President Foods began producing MAMA brand instant noodles at a factory in Nong Khang Phlu. In 1986, the factory was relocated to a larger site in Si Racha.

Nong Khaem was also the original location of Channel 3 before the station moved to its current location in Khlong Toei in 1999.

The district is one of Bangko's three main solid waste disposal centres. It processes around 3,500 tonnes of waste daily from all 16 districts on the Thonburi side of the Chao Phraya River. The other two Bangkok Metropolitan Administration (BMA) disposal centres are located on the eastern side, in the Prawet and Sai Mai districts. The Nong Khaem facility operates with an annual budget of two billion baht.

Nong Khaem has also long been home to the only spotted deer farm in Bangkok.

== Transportation ==
Phet Kasem is the main road of the district, Ma Chareon Road (Soi Phet Kasem 81) and Soi Phet Kasem 69 (Khlong Khwang) are the shortcuts to Bang Bon and connect with other roads. This district still has no BTS or MRT access. The nearest MRT station is Lak Song located in Bang Khae beside The Mall Bang Khae. However, the district is served by many bus lines, both BMTA and affiliated bus services, such as 4-36 (7), (4-43) 80, 4-45 (81), 4-46 (84), 4-57, 91ก, 4-50 (123), 4-59 (189), 4-63 (547), and also local buses as well.

== Places ==
- Southeast Asia University (SAU)
- Thonburi University
- Muban Kru Technological College
- Wat Nong Khaem
- Wat Wong La Pha Ram
- Wat Udomrangsi
- Vichaivej International Nongkhaem Hospital
