= Samphran Elephant Ground & Zoo =

Zoo in Thailand

Coordinates: 13°46′12.6″N 100°15′13.7″E

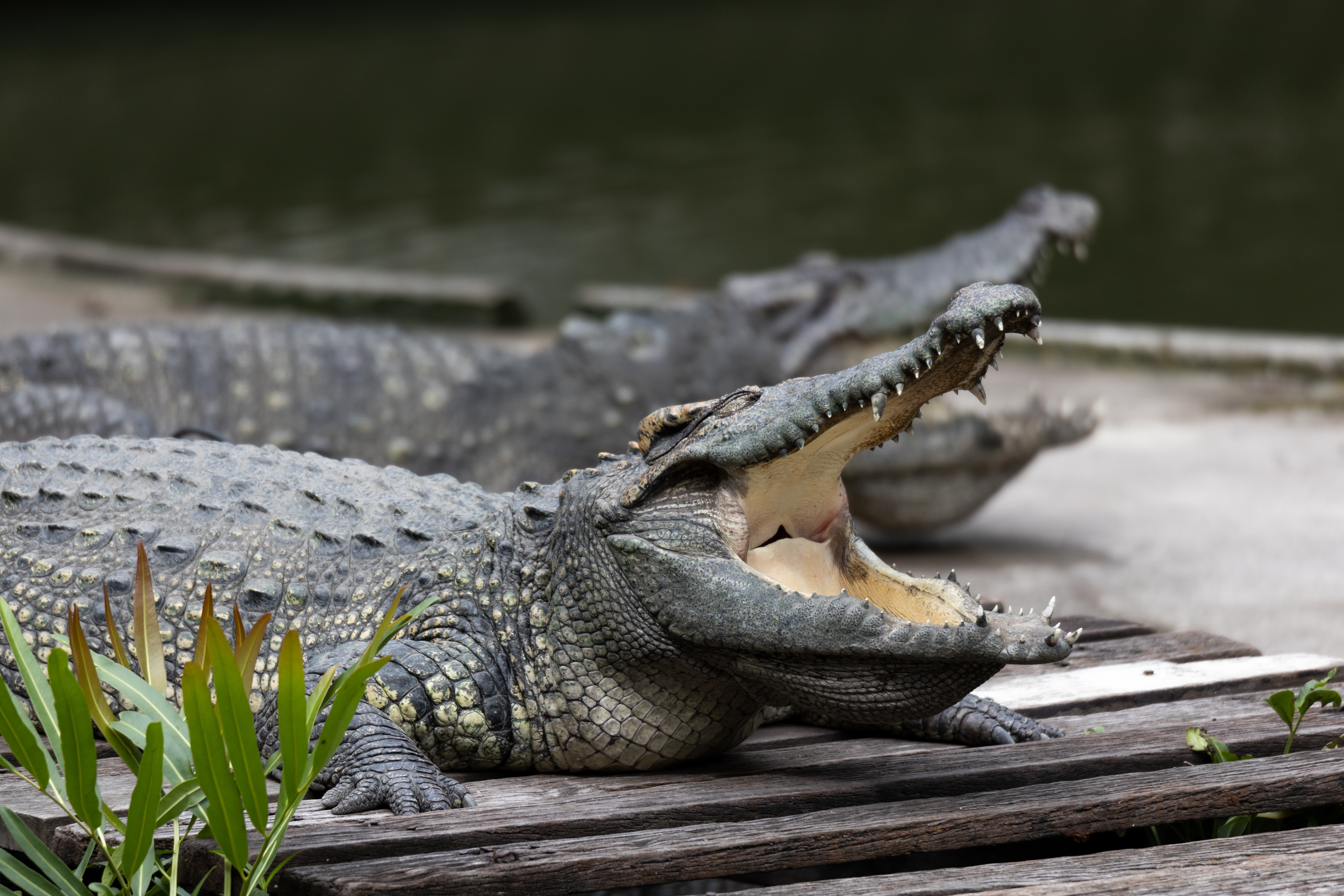
Crocodylus siamensis at Samphran Elephant Ground & Zoo

Samphran Elephant Ground & Zoo (Thai: ลานแสดงช้างและฟาร์มจระเข้สามพราน) is a famous tourist place located in Tha Kham, Sam Phran, Nakhon Pathom Province, central Thailand.

== General ==
Samphran Elephant Ground & Zoo was established by Mr. Pichai Chaimongkoltrakul. The zoo officially opened to the public on March 24, 1985 as a tourist destination, orchid propagation facility and animal breeding especially crocodiles and elephants.

== Location ==
Samphran Elephant Ground & Zoo is located at 117 Moo 6, Petkasem Rd, Sam Phran, Nakhon Pathom, Thailand, west of Bangkok and about 40 kilometers from the city.

== Main show ==
The elephant theme show and the crocodile wrestling show are the highlight events in this zoo.

=== Elephant theme show ===
The elephant show consists of a group of elephants dancing, racing, painting and re-enacting “Yutha Hathi”, a royal battle in Thai history, performed with actors riding on the elephants.

=== Crocodile wrestling ===
The crocodile wrestling show consists of handlers demonstrating to the visitors how to catch crocodiles with their bare hands and also put their arms or heads inside the crocodile’s jaws.

Show time

The zoo open is daily from 08.30 A.M. – 05.30 P.M.

Daily Show Time	1st show	2nd show
Elephant Theme Show	01.45 P.M. – 02.10 P.M.	03.30 P.M. – 04.00 P.M.
Crocodile Wrestling Show	00.45 P.M. – 01.05 P.M.	02.20 P.M. – 02.40 P.M.
Magic Show	01.15 P.M. – 01.45 P.M.	03.00 P.M. – 03.30 P.M.

Visitors can ride the elephants and visit tropical gardens and waterfalls around the zoo. They can also visit the orchid nursery and the crocodile nursery. Located at the zoo is the ‘Erawan Restaurant’ which provides international cuisine and offers food and drinks for visitors if they are hungry throughout the day.
