= Neta L =

Battery electric mid-size crossover SUV

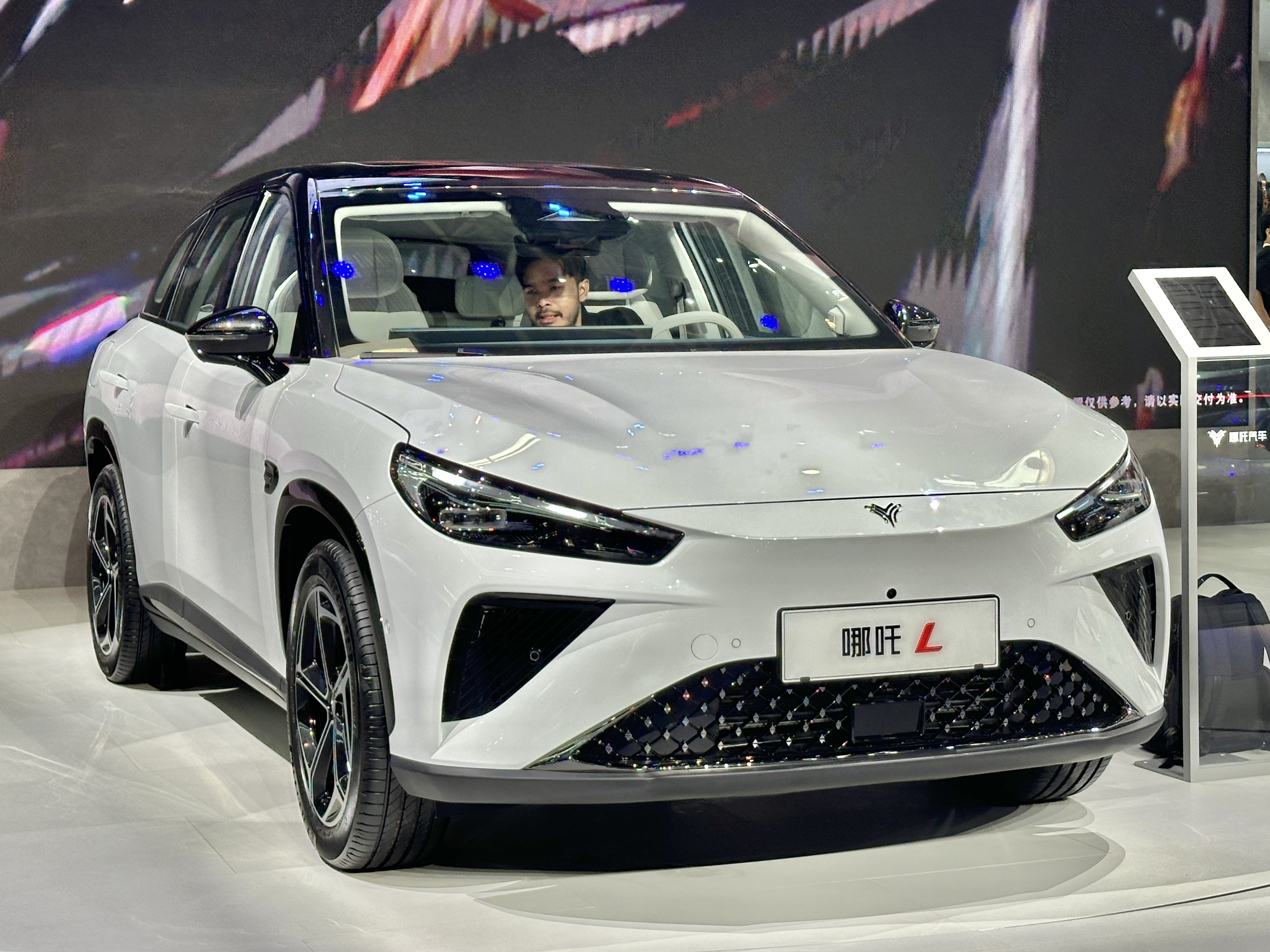

Overview
- Manufacturer: Hozon Auto
- Production: 2024
- Assembly: China: Yichun, Jiangxi

Body and chassis
- Class: Mid-size crossover SUV (D)
- Body style: 5-door SUV
- Layout: Rear-motor, rear-wheel-drive; Front-engine, rear-motor, rear-wheel drive (EREV)
- Platform: Shenhai platform

Powertrain
- Engine: Petrol range extender: 1.5 L Dongfeng H15R I4
- Electric motor: Permanent magnet synchronous
- Power output: 228 hp (170 kW; 231 PS)
- Hybrid drivetrain: Range-extended electric
- Battery: 30 kWh LFP Gotion; 40.3 kWh LFP CATL; 43.9 kWh Freevoy LFP CATL; 68 kWh Shenxing LFP CATL
- Range: 1,300 km (810 mi) (EREV)
- Electric range: 510 km (317 mi) (EV, CLTC); 164–210 km (102–130 mi) (EREV, WLTC); 220–310 km (137–193 mi) (EREV, CLTC)

Dimensions
- Wheelbase: 2,810 mm (111 in)
- Length: 4,770 mm (188 in)
- Width: 1,900 mm (75 in)
- Height: 1,660 mm (65 in)

The Neta L (Chinese: 哪吒L; pinyin: Nézhā L) is a battery electric mid-size crossover SUV produced by Hozon Auto under the Neta (Nezha) brand, a Chinese all-electric car manufacturer.

== History ==
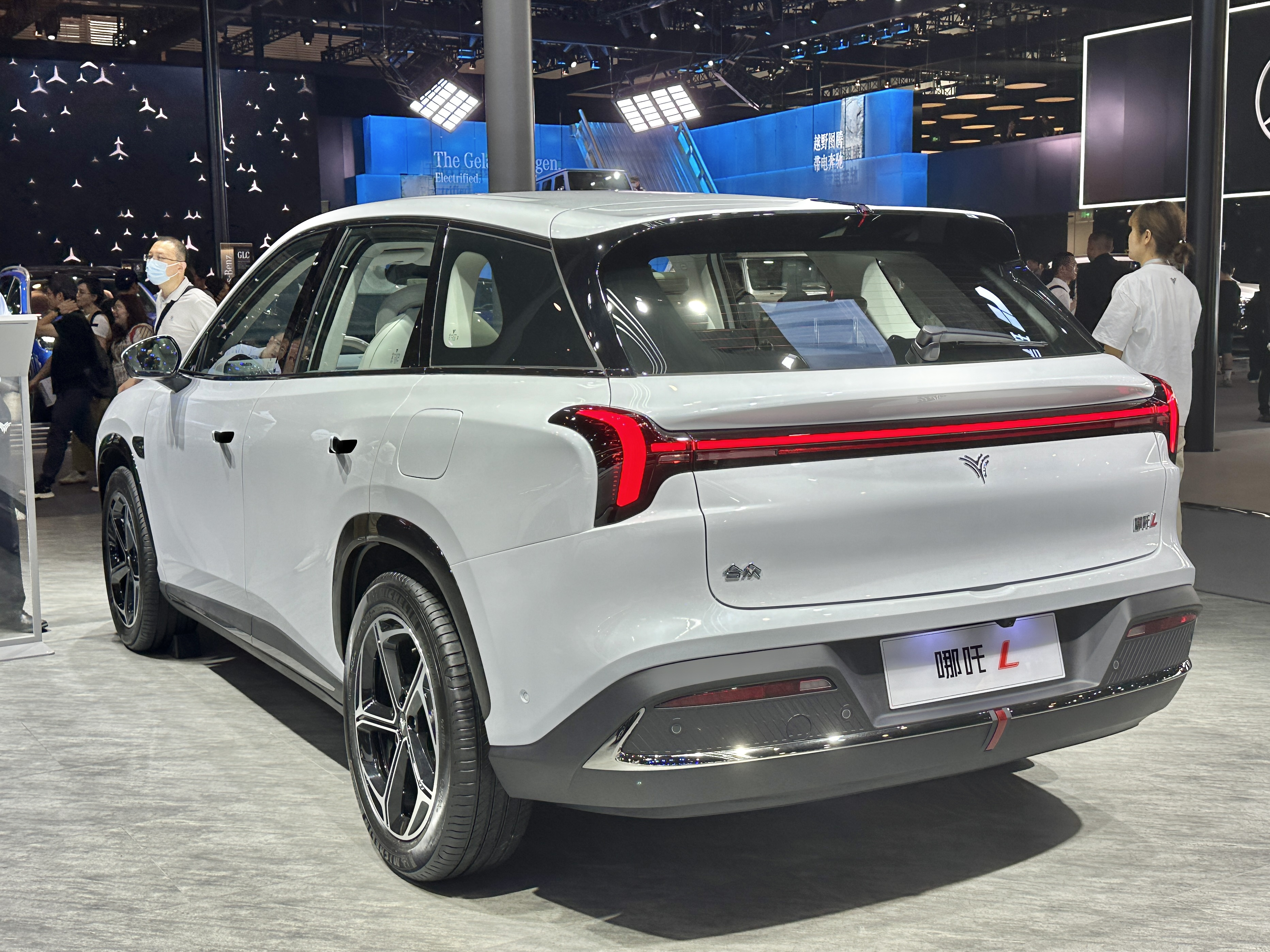
Rear view

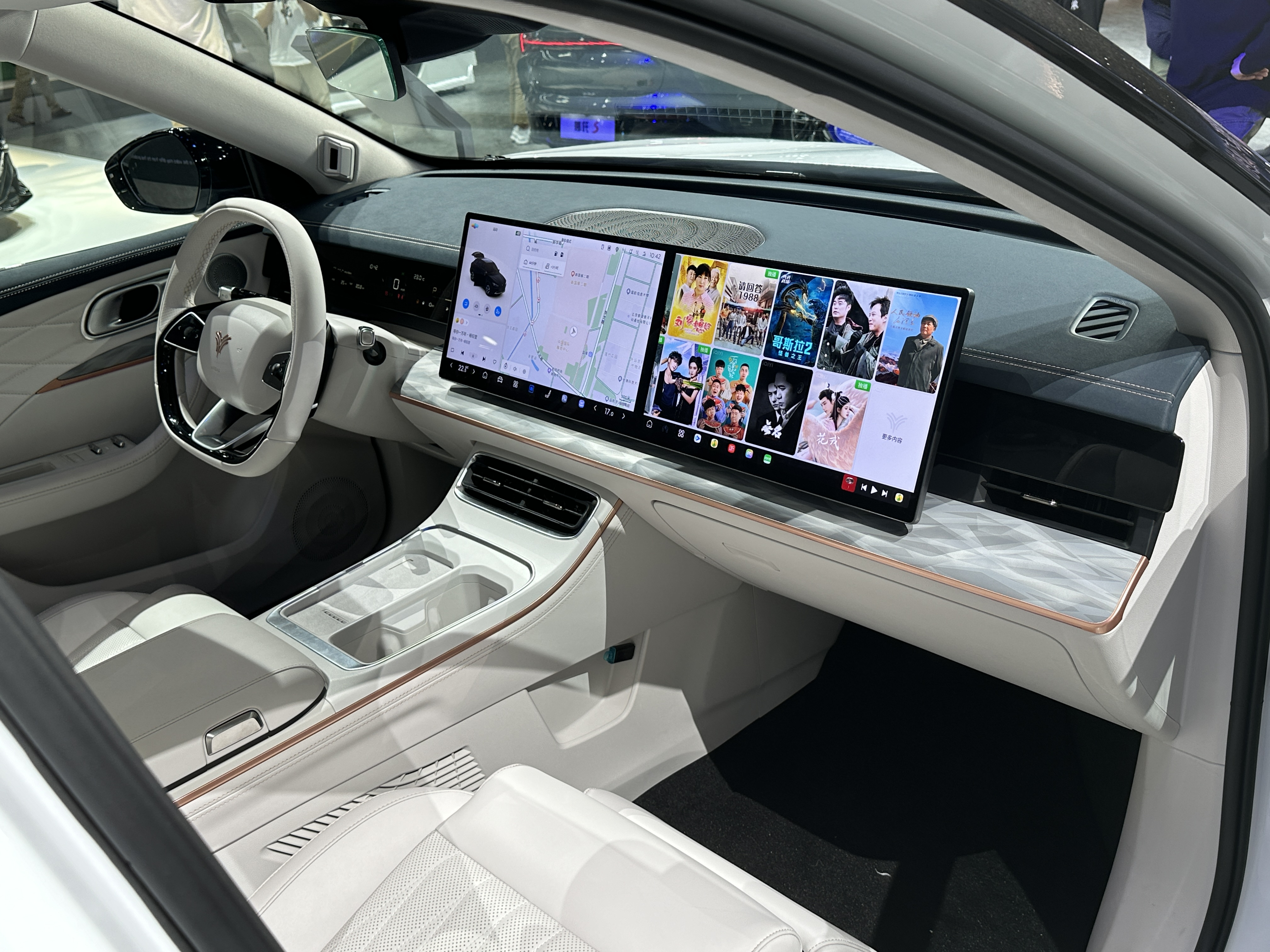
Interior

In early March 2024, Chinese electric car manufacturer Hozon Auto introduced another model in its range, this time in the form of the large, mid-size SUV Neta L, intended to help increase market share through a popular segment in the Chinese market. The car adopted stylistic features identical to the Neta S and Neta GT models, distinguishing itself with retractable door handles, clearly outlined fenders and a pointed front. Narrow, oblong headlights contrast with the narrow light reflector running along the entire rear part of the body.

The passenger cabin has a luxurious arrangement emphasizing access to an extensive multimedia system. The dashboard is formed by a set of two 15.6-inch touchscreens fused together, acting as a central multimedia system and an additional screen for the passenger. The driver has a smaller, narrow display in front of the steering wheel. The passenger has an additional backrest tilt function, and both seats have an extensive 8-point massage system. There is an extensive fridge for drinks in the armrest, and there are foldable tables on the backrests of the seats for the rear passengers.

== Specifications ==
The Neta L was designed with two types of drive in mind. The basic, fully electric version is powered by a 228 HP engine and has a 69 kWh LFP battery offering a maximum range of up to 510 kilometers according to the Chinese CLTC standard. The top hybrid variant has a power unit consisting of an electric motor as the main source of energy and a 1.5-liter combustion unit with a power of 90 HP ensuring extended range. This variant received two battery variants enabling the possibility of driving in fully electric mode: 30 kWh and 40 kWh.

== Sales ==
Year	China		
Year	EV	EREV	Total
2024	1,956	16,852	18,808
2025	48	1,388	1,436
