= Neta N01 =

Battery electric subcompact crossover SUV (2018-2020)

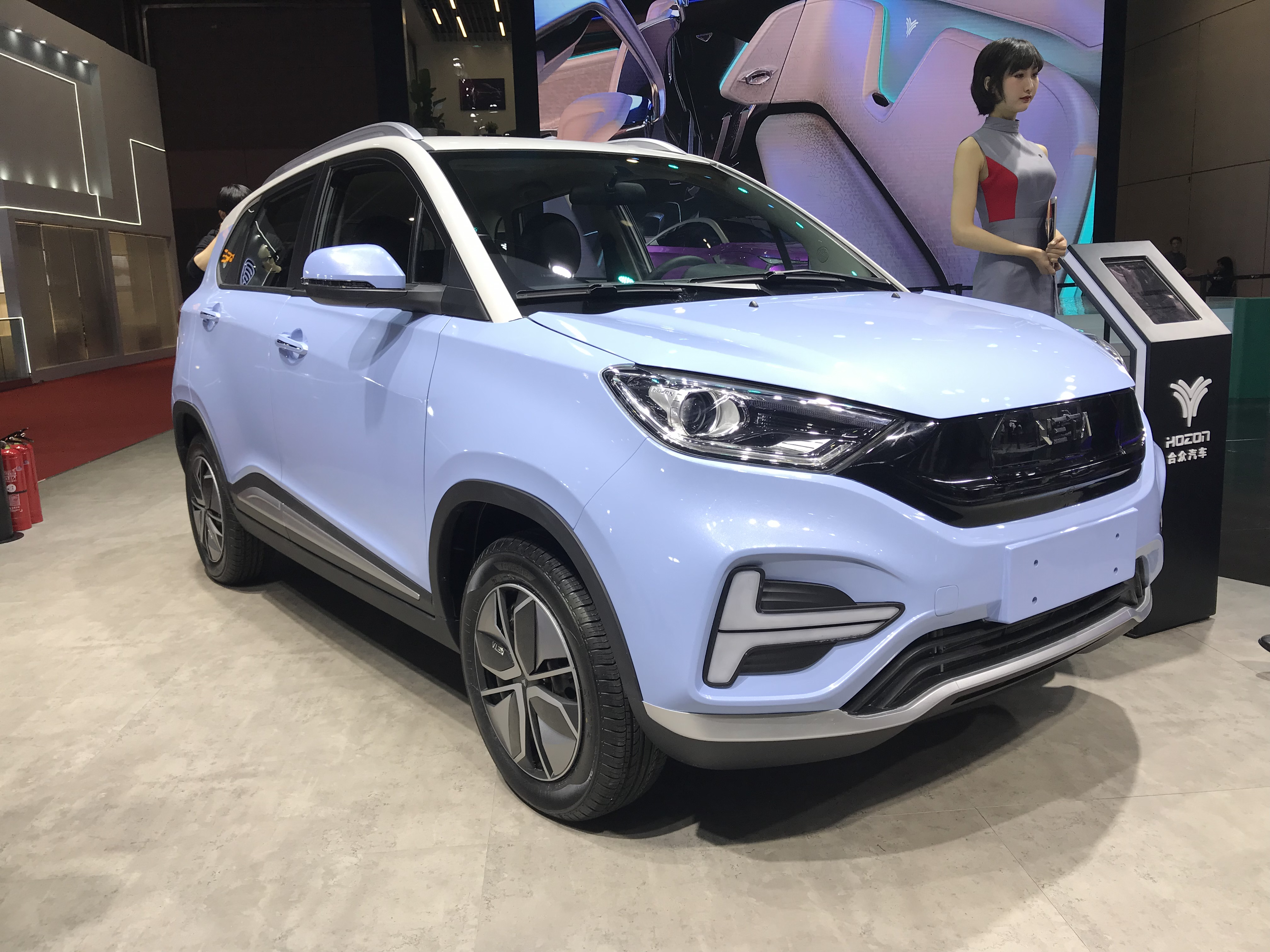

Overview
- Manufacturer: Hozon Auto
- Production: 2018–2020 (Over 18,000 Units)
- Assembly: China: Zhejiang

Body and chassis
- Class: Subcompact crossover SUV (B)
- Body style: 5-door SUV
- Layout: Front engine, front wheel drive

Powertrain
- Electric motor: 1x AC PMSM
- Power output: 55 kW (74 hp; 75 PS)
- Transmission: 1-speed direct-drive
- Battery: 35 kWh (Li-ion battery)
- Electric range: 301 km (187 mi)
- Plug-in charging: 120 V (8 hours) (AC charging, 0–100%); 240 V (30 minutes) (DC charging, 0–80%)

Dimensions
- Wheelbase: 2,370 mm (93.3 in)
- Length: 3,872 mm (152.4 in)
- Width: 1,648 mm (64.9 in)
- Height: 1,571 mm (61.9 in)

Chronology
- Successor: Neta Aya

The Neta N01 (Chinese: 哪吒N01; pinyin: Nézhā N01) is a battery electric subcompact crossover SUV produced by Hozon Auto under the Neta (Nezha) brand, a Chinese all-electric car marque. It was manufactured by the Zhejiang Hezhong New Energy Automobile Company.

== Overview ==
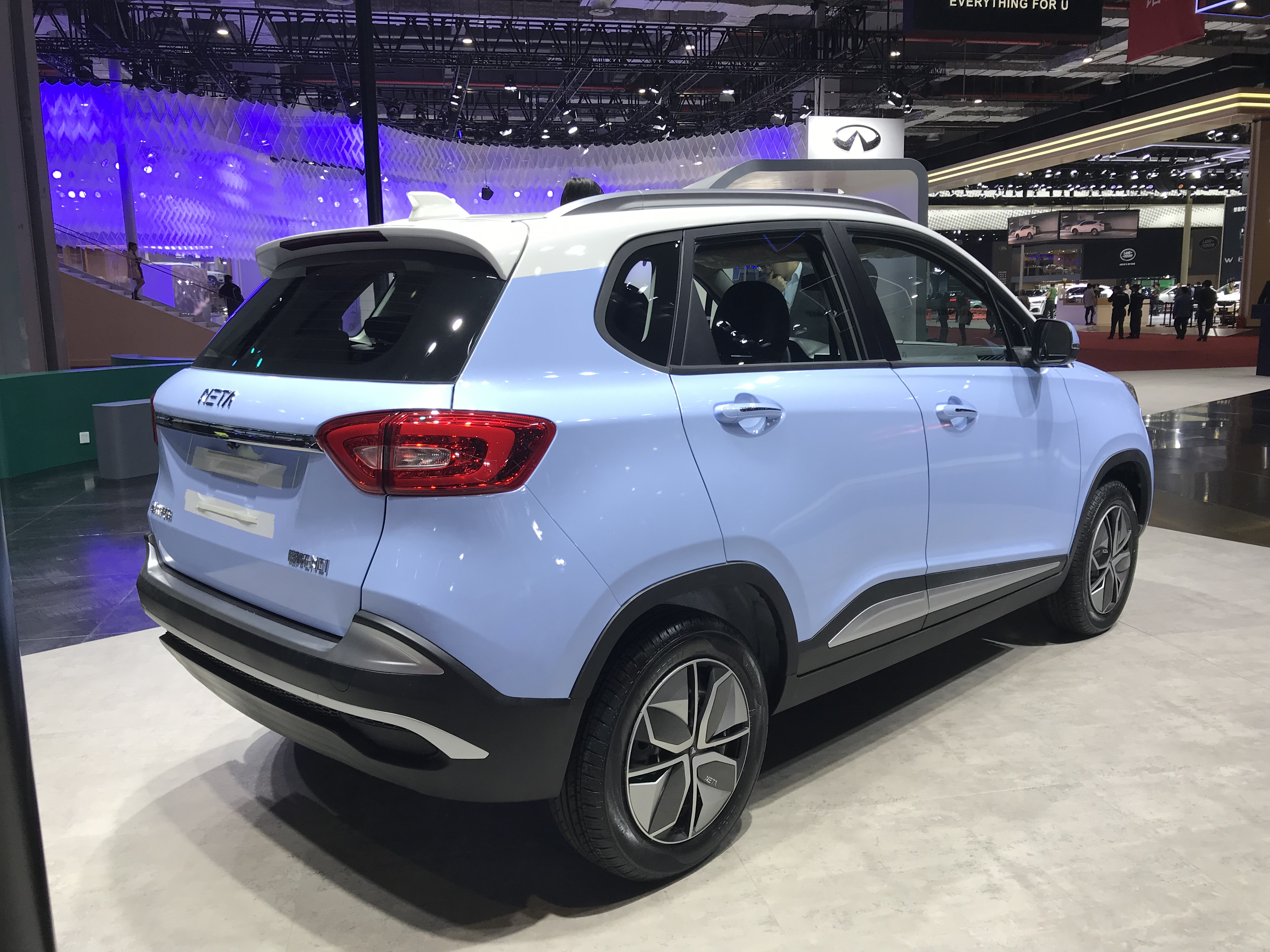
Rear view

The Neta N01 was launched in 2018. It is powered by a single electric motor to the front axle, with a power output of 75 bhp (56 kW; 76 PS) and 175 N⋅m (129 lb⋅ft) of torque.

The N01 is 3,872 mm (152.4 in) long, with a wheelbase of 2,370 mm (93.3 in).

The price of the Neta N01 ranged from 66,800 to 139,800 yuan at launch.

== Sales ==
Year	China
2018	1,206
2019	10,006
2020	8,158
