= Hozon Auto =

Chinese electric vehicle manufacturer

Hozon Auto New Energy Automobile Co., Ltd.
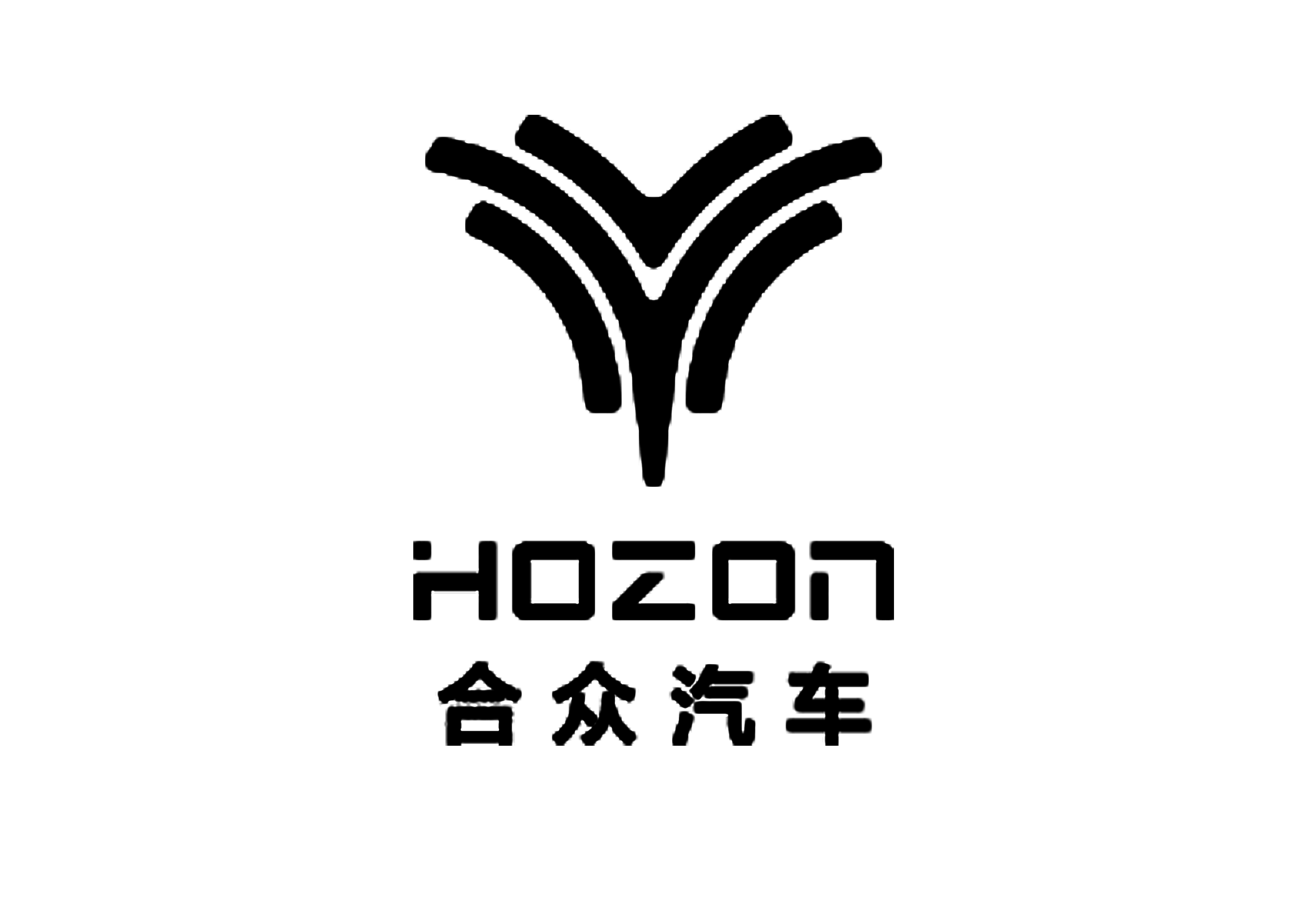
- Type: Public
- Industry: Automotive
- Founded: October 2014; 11 years ago
- Founder: Fang Yun Zhou
- Headquarters: Shanghai, China
- Area served: China; Thailand; Malaysia; Indonesia; Mexico; Brazil; Laos; Uzbekistan; Singapore; Nepal
- Production output: ▼127,496 (2023)
- Brands: Neta Auto
- Revenue: ▲RMB 13.554 billion (2023)
- Operating income: ▲ -6.867 billion RMB (2023)
- Net income: ▲-6.758 billion RMB (2023)
- Total assets: ▼RMB 21.366 billion (2023)
- Owner: Nanning Minsheng New Energy Industry Investment Partnership (Limited Partnership) (11.20%); Beijing Huading New Power Equity Investment Fund (Limited Partnership) (9.82%); Yichun Jinhe Equity Investment Co., Ltd. (7.96%); Chengdu Hongjing Technology Co., Ltd. (6.30%)
- Number of employees: 9,000
- Subsidiaries: Neta Auto (Thailand); Neta Auto Malaysia; Neta Auto Indonesia; Neta Auto Brazil

Chinese name
- Simplified Chinese: 合众新能源汽车股份有限公司
- Hanyu Pinyin: Hézhòng Xīn Néngyuán Qìchē Gǔfèn Yǒuxiàn Gōngsī
- Website: hozonauto.com; netaauto.co (global)

Hozon Auto (Chinese: 合众汽车; pinyin: Hézhòng Qìchē) is a Chinese electric car manufacturer which was established in 2014. It produces vehicles under the Neta (Chinese: 哪吒; pinyin: Nézhā) brand.

== History ==
Hozon Auto was founded in 2014 in the Zhejiang province, co-founded by Beijing Sinohytec and Zhejiang Yangtze Delta Region Institute of Tsinghua University and is based in Jiaxing. It opened an Autonomous Vehicle Research Centre in California's Silicon Valley in 2018, and a Beijing-based Design Centre opened in March 2019. Its current headquarters are located in Putuo District, Shanghai, which was opened in 2023.

The company announced its first concept car in 2017. The first production model Neta N01 compact SUV was launched in 2018 built on its HPA platform along with the launch of the Neta brand, with orders for the mid-sized Neta U SUV based on the HPC platform being taken in 2019. The company has plans for further models based on the two platforms.

In terms of the number of vehicles delivered and sold in 2021, the company was ranked fourth in the Chinese EV market after XPeng, Li Auto, and NIO. Compared to its competitors, it focuses on the low-priced market.

The company's deliveries from January to November 2022 are expected to reach 144,278 units, making it the first emerging EV manufacturer to achieve annual sales of more than 150,000 units. The total number of vehicles delivered since the brand was established is 240,255. While it took 42 months to reach 100,000 units, it took only eight months to go from 100,000 to 200,000 units.

In March 2024, in order to alleviate the financial pressure of Hozon and facilitate its expansion in overseas markets, the government of Hong Kong announced to provide a subsidy of up to HK$ 200 million (25.6 million USD). The Hong Kong government also promise to assist its cornerstone round of IPO and rise 200 million USD. In return, Hozon will establish a manufacturing plant in Hong Kong.

In April 2024, three investment companies founded by the governments of Yichun, Tongxiang and Nanning, announced that they will jointly inject 5 billion RMB (691 million USD) into Hozon to alleviate financial pressures and for a future IPO.

In March 2025, Hozon Auto announced that it had reached debt-to-equity agreements totaling over 2 billion yuan with 134 domestic core suppliers. This debt-to-equity plan received support from leading suppliers such as CATL, Gotion High-Tech, BDStar Intelligent & Connected, and Greenway Automotive Lighting. In the same month, at a dealer conference in Bangkok, Thailand, Hozon Auto also signed four key agreements with local suppliers and financial institutions, securing a credit line of 10 billion Thai baht (approximately 2.15 billion yuan). The company plans to begin localized production of the Neta X in Thailand in July.

Since 2025, the shareholding platform established by Zhang Yong and Fang Yunzhou for the core founding team of Neta Auto has been subject to multiple judicial freezes involving significant sums. Hozon Auto's three major production bases in Yichun, Nanning, and Tongxiang have all ceased production, and its supply chain system has nearly collapsed. State-owned capital from Yichun, Nanning, Tongxiang, and other localities has invested a total of over 5 billion yuan, and with the suspension of projects, these funds are largely unrecoverable.

In September 2026, creditors discussed plans to invest RMB ¥3 billion into the company to kickstart a three phase development plan. The first phase will involve restarting production of the Neta X with a target annual sales target of 10,000 units. The second phase will focus on launching vehicles for export to Asia, Africa and Latin America with 300,000 units annually, and the third phase involves launching high-tech global models with an RMB ¥40 billion annual output and preparing for an IPO.

=== Sales strategy ===
Of the more than 300 NEV startup brands in China in 2019, Neta was one of the 12 which successfully began mass production and deliveries, and was one of only 4 which sold more than 10,000 vehicles that year. Neta's sales rapidly increased from 2020 to its peak of 148,700 in 2022 off the low-cost Neta V and Neta U, ranking first place amongst NEV brand annual sales that year and positioning it as one of China's NEV leaders.

In 2023, in an effort to move upmarket, Neta introduced the Neta S and Neta GT to compete in the high-end of the market. As part of that effort, Neta moved sales of the successful lower-end high-volume Neta V and U models to be sold only at 4S dealerships, allowing their direct sales stores to focus their marketing exclusively on the new high-end models. However, sales of the new models were poor despite the brand's full marketing efforts, and the effort to push upmarket undermined the brand's entry-level customer base. In 2023 Neta's annual sales fell to the Neta V and U still accounted for over 51% of the brand's annual sales despite being relegated to the smaller dealership sales network.

In 2024, Neta reverted to its previous entry-level mass-market positioning with the low-cost Neta L in an attempt to regain their previous sales leadership; it achieved initial sales success and positive enthusiasm from consumers, but persistent delivery delays of the model led to the brand's reputation and sales decline, which combined with the insufficient updates to the Neta U and V ultimately led to the company's failure.

The largest region of Neta owners is Zhejiang province at 11.6%, followed by Hebei province at 9.4% and Tianjin at 7.1%.

Cumulative Neta sales proportion by region
Province	Sales proportion	City	Sales proportion
Zhejiang	11.6%	Tianjin	7.1%
Hebei	9.4%	Xingtai	5.1%
Henan	8.4%	Zhengzhou	2.9%
Jiangsu	8.2%	Hangzhou	2.8%
Guangdong	7.6%	Yichang	2.8%
Guangxi	7.1%	Nanning	2.8%
Tianjin	7.1%	Shanghai	2.6%
Hubei	6.3%	Chengdu	2.2%
Shandong	6.3%	Wenzhou	1.8%
Anhui	4.3%	Jiaxing	1.8%
Total	76.3%	Total	31.9%

== Overseas markets ==
In March 2023, Hozon Auto announced the construction of its first overseas production facility in Bangkok, Thailand. The facility is scheduled to operate at the end of January 2024 and will target at manufacturing and exporting right-hand drive electric cars to ASEAN countries. In November 2023, Neta Auto (Thailand) Co., Ltd. with its partner, Bangchan General Assembly Co., Ltd. (BGAC), started assembling right-hand drive electric cars in Thailand, with its first model the Neta V-II. At this point, over 12,000 units of the imported Neta V have been delivered within Thailand.

In August 2023, Hozon Auto through its subsidiary PT Neta Auto Indonesia introduced the Neta V in Indonesia, with deliveries commenced in November 2023. In April 2024, Neta Auto Indonesia started assembling vehicles at the PT Handal Motor Indonesia plant, with the facelifted V-II.

In 2024, Hozon Auto started an operation in Brazil and announced a local factory for 2025. The Brazilian factory will build all the supply for the South American market. Hozon Auto expands into Africa in 2024 by entering Kenya.

== Products ==
Hozon Auto currently has a single brand called Neta.

=== Discontinued models ===
- Neta U/X (2020–2026), compact SUV, BEV
- Neta V/Aya (2020–2026), subcompact SUV, BEV
- Neta S (2022–2024), mid-size sedan/estate wagon, BEV/REEV
- Neta GT (2023–2024), mid-size sports car, BEV
- Neta L (2024), mid-size SUV, BEV/REEV
- Neta N01 (2018–2020), subcompact SUV, BEV
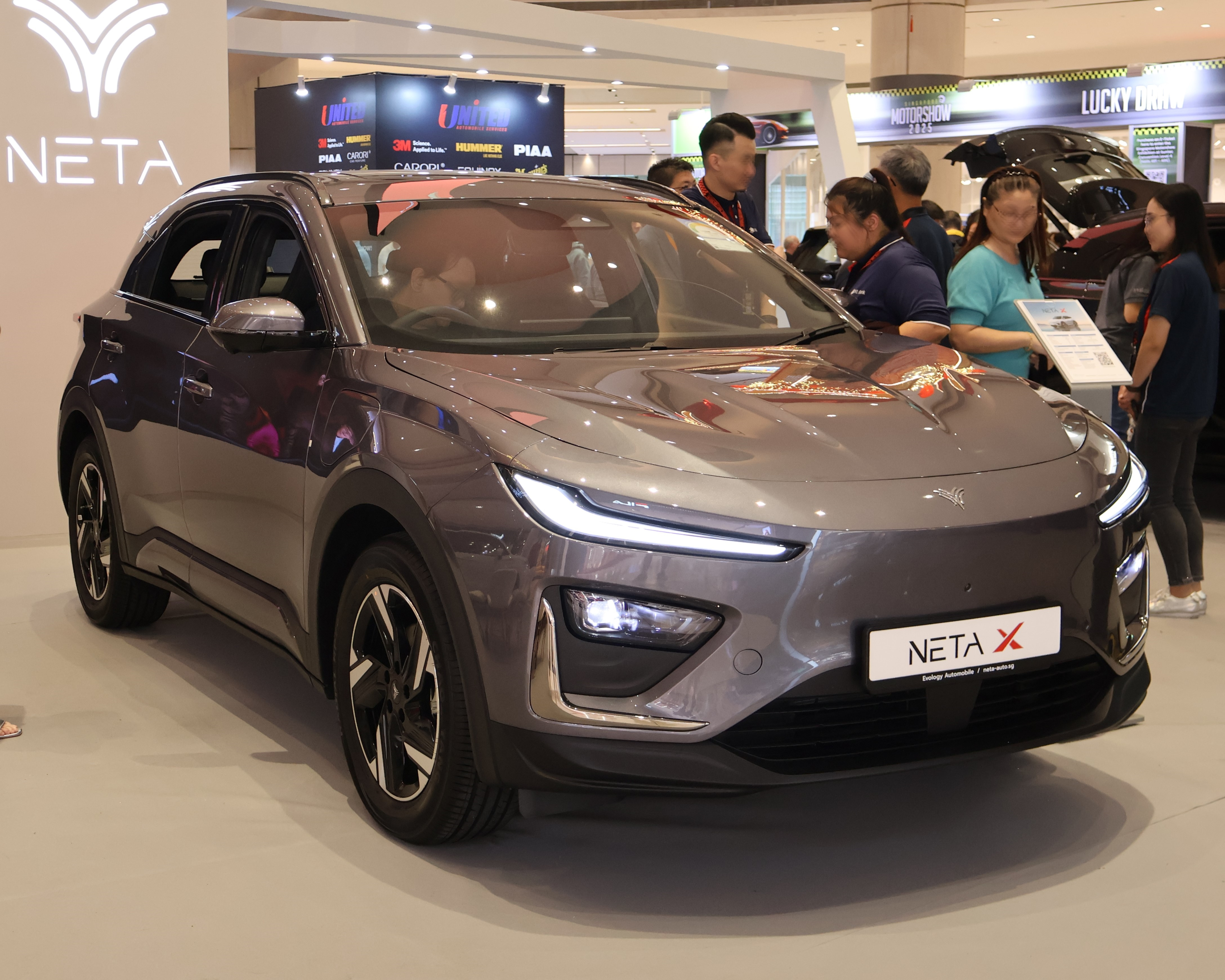
Neta X

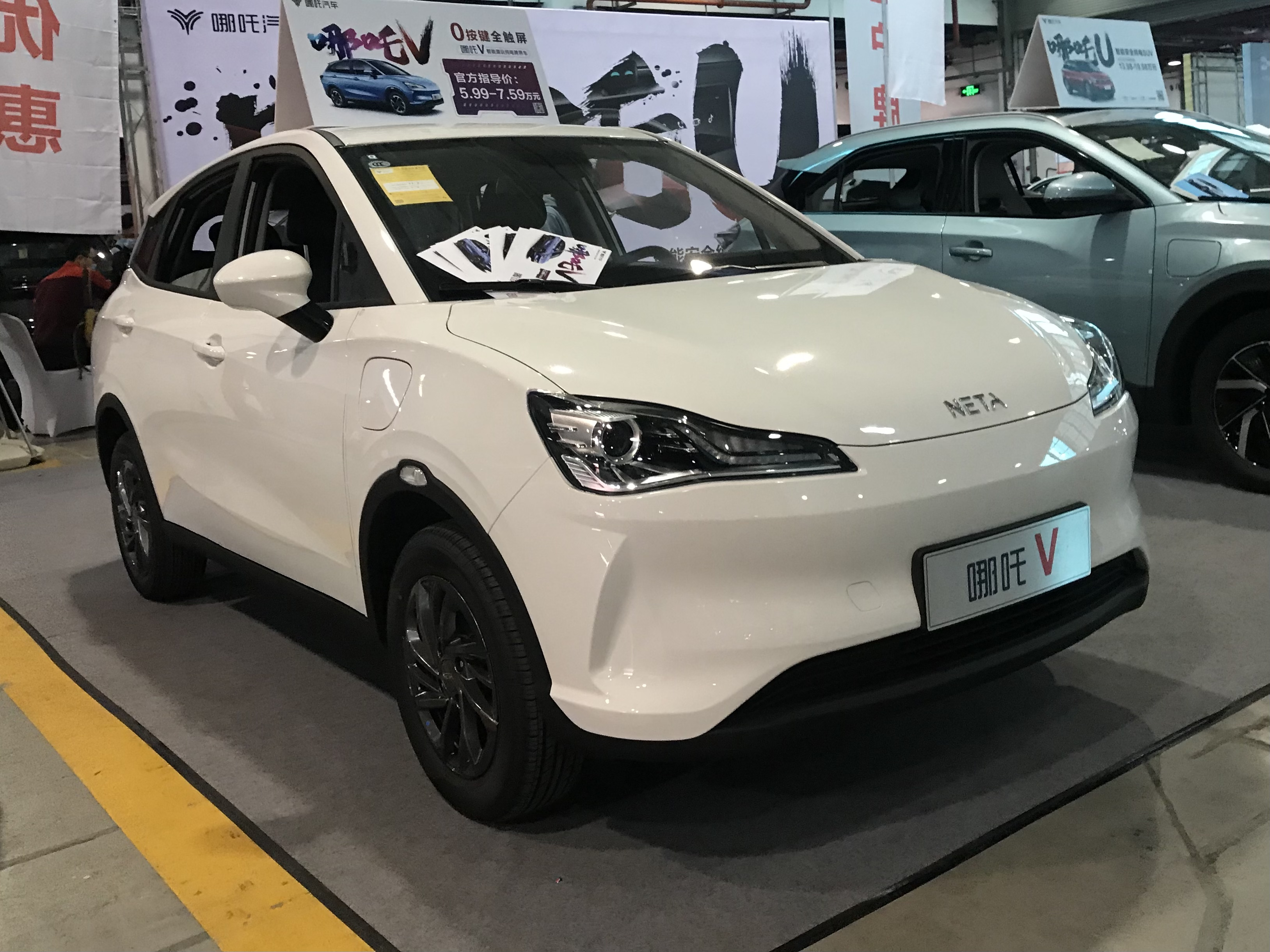
Neta V

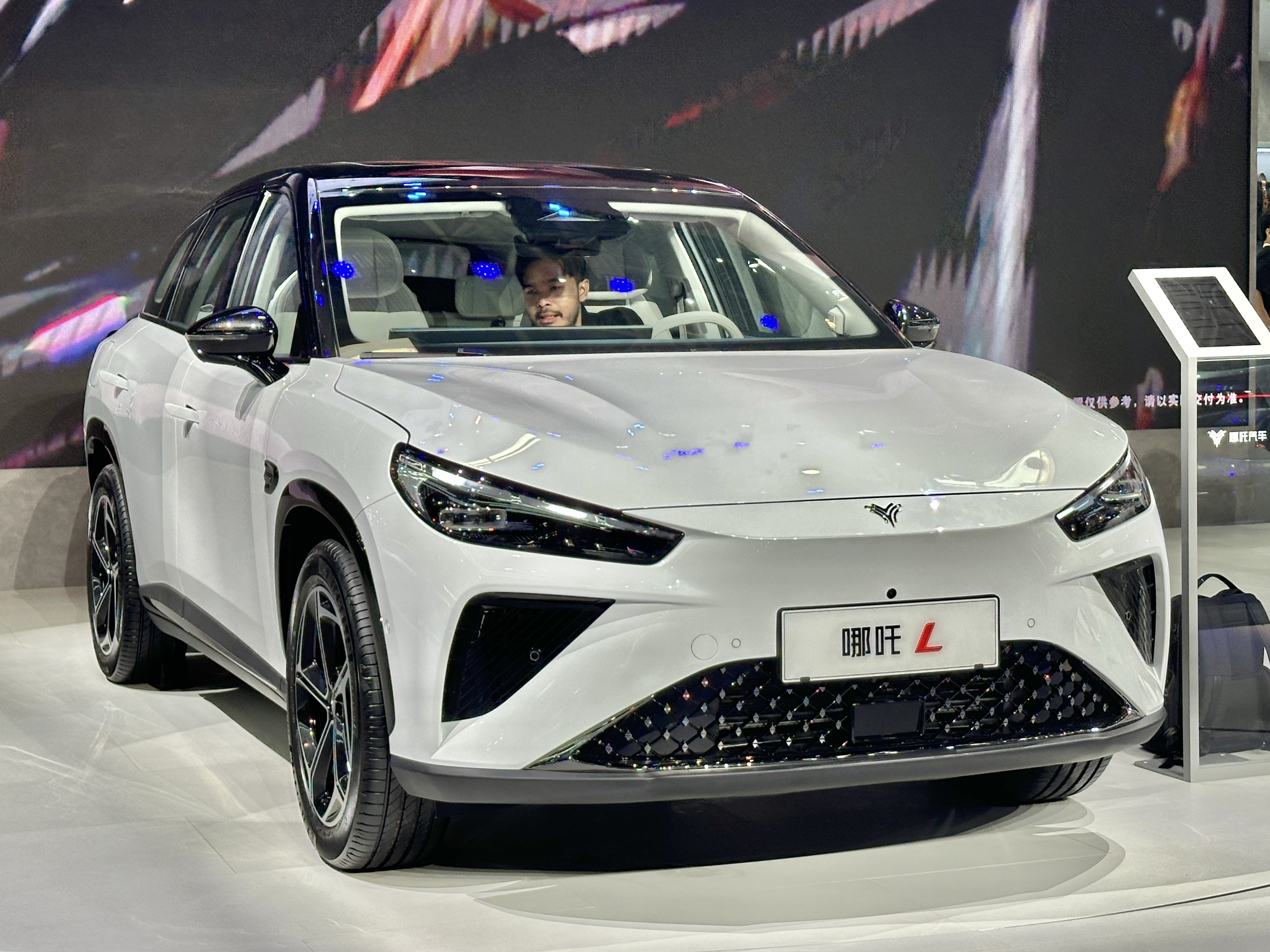
Neta L

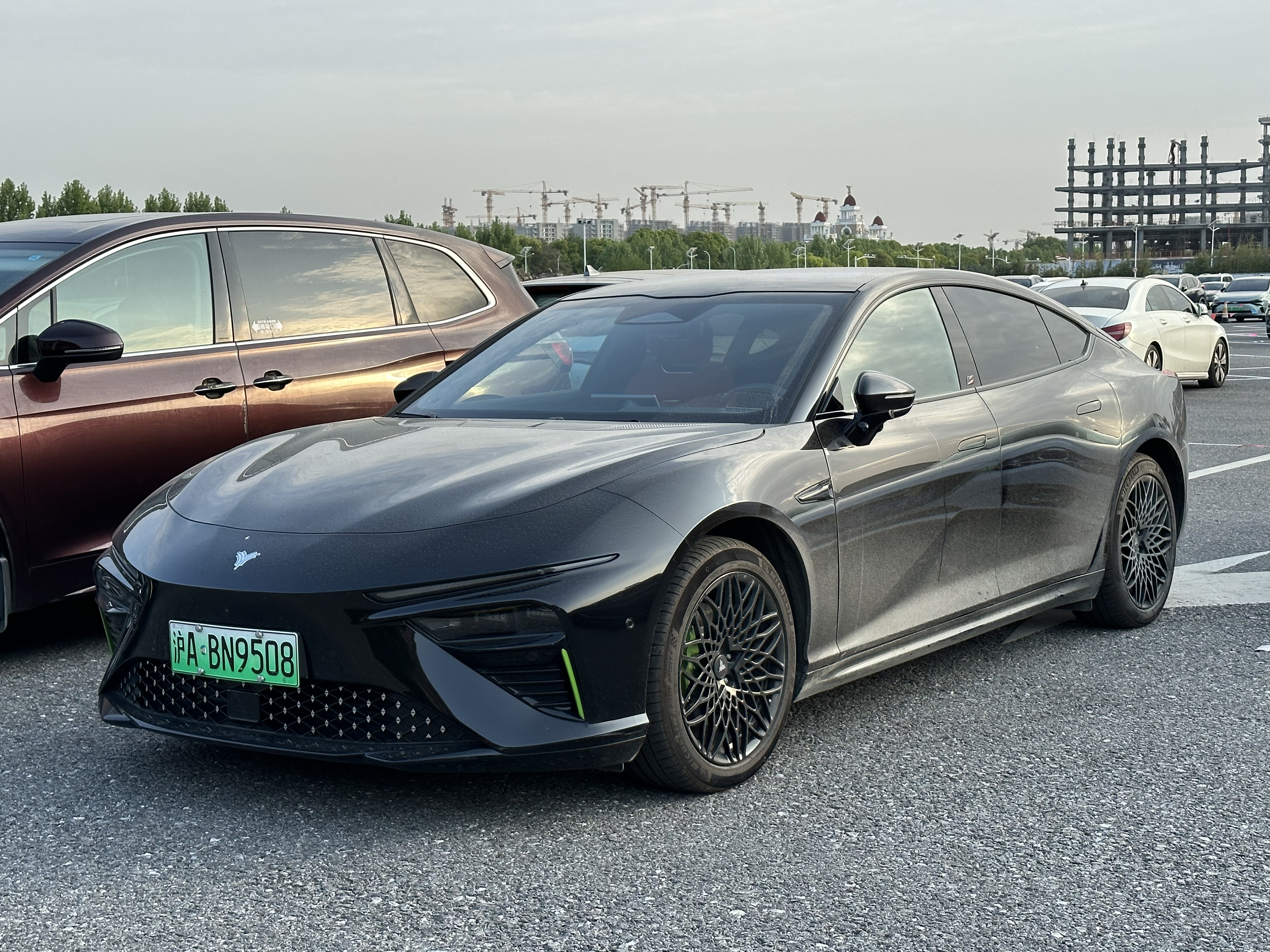
Neta S

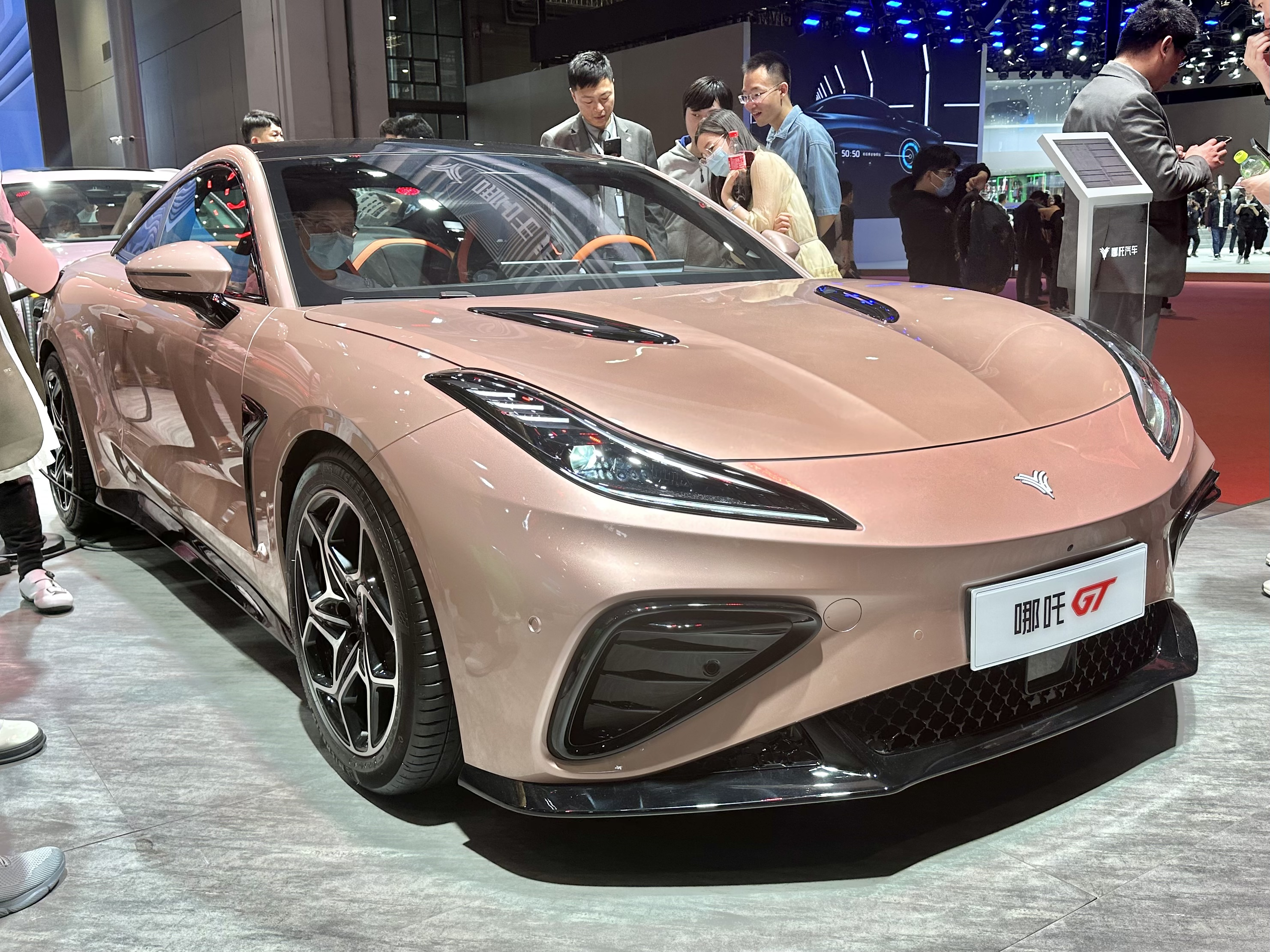
Neta GT

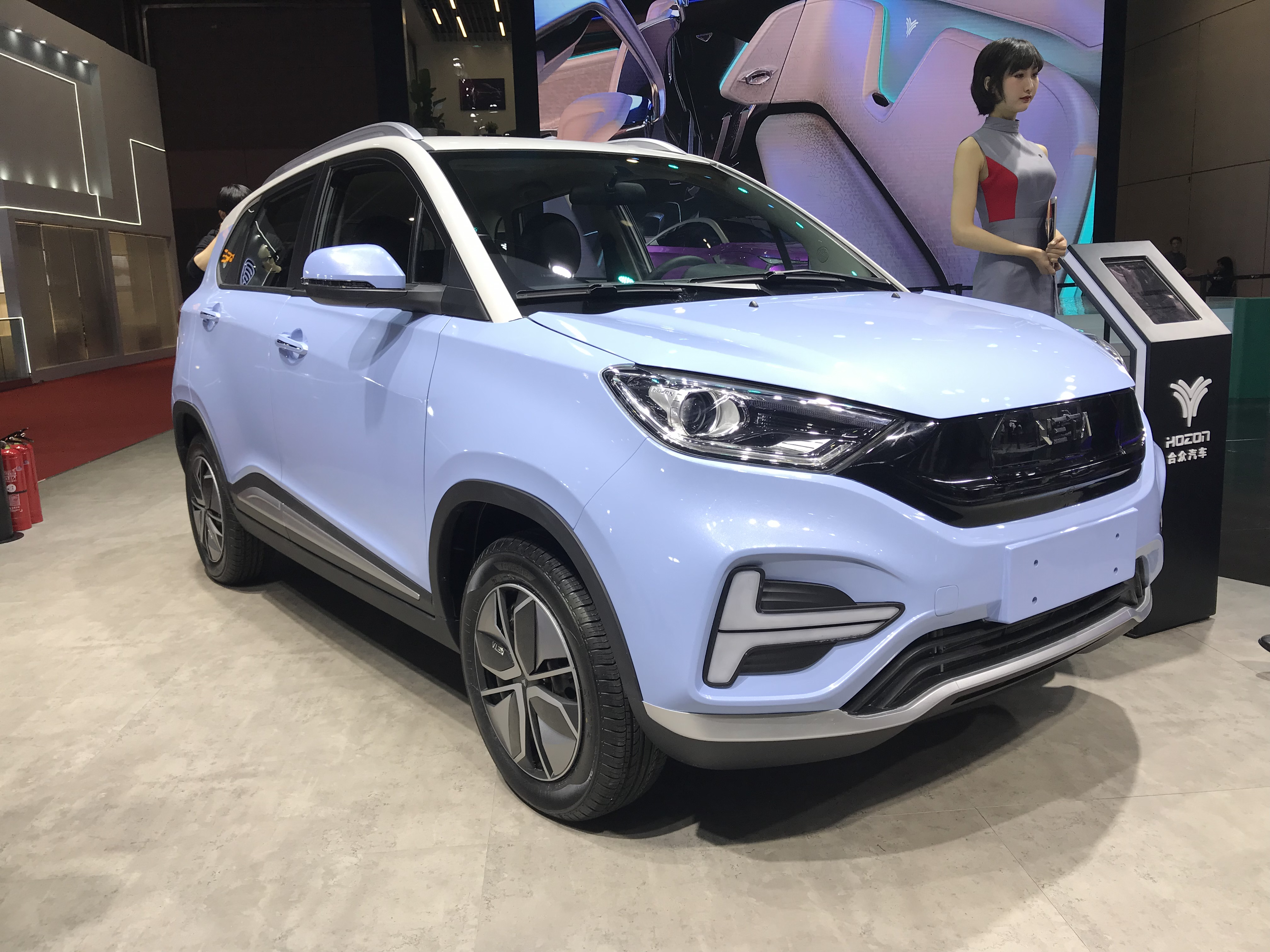
Neta N01

=== Concepts ===
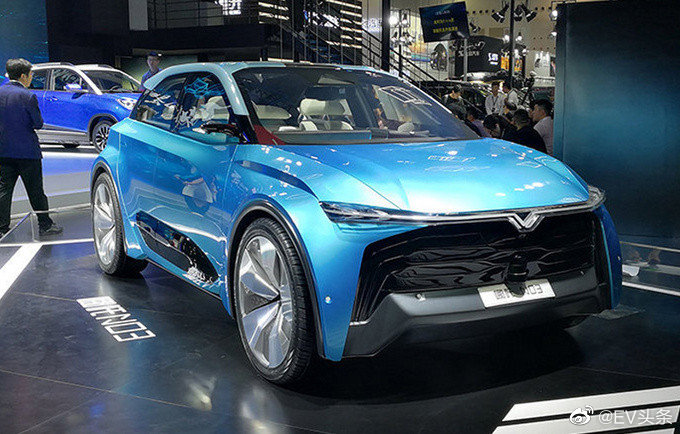
Neta Eureka 01 Concept

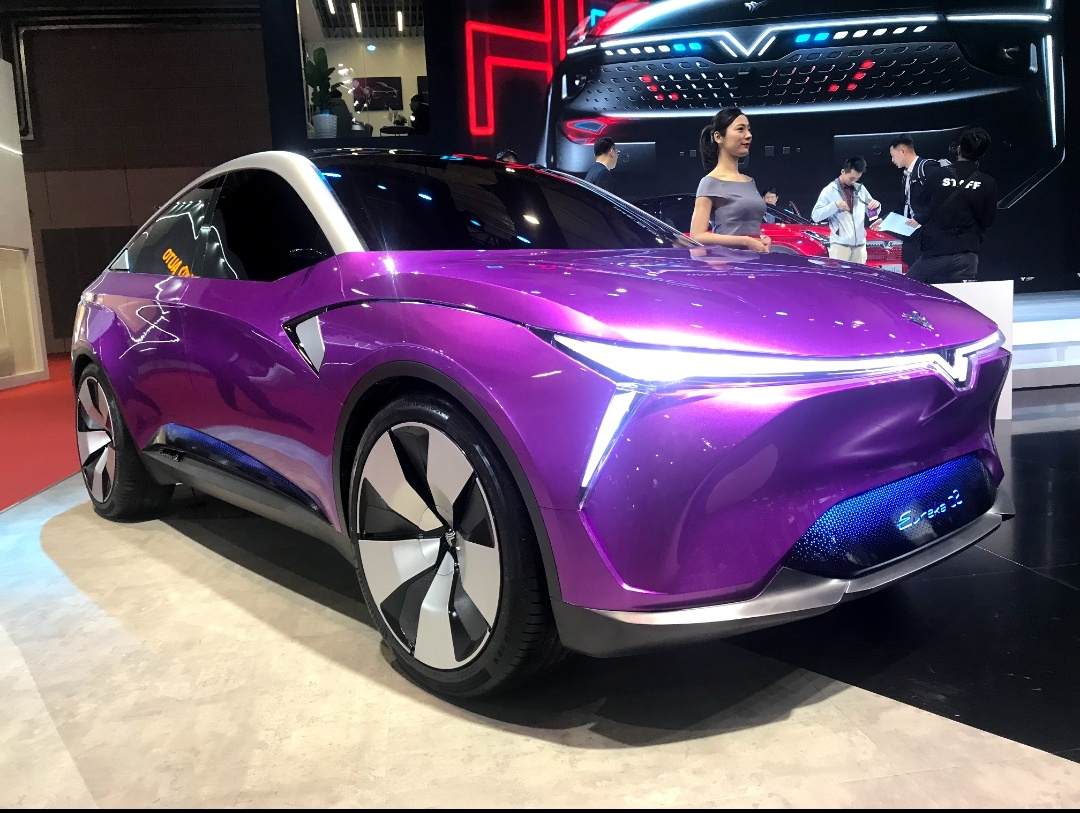
Neta Eureka 02 Concept

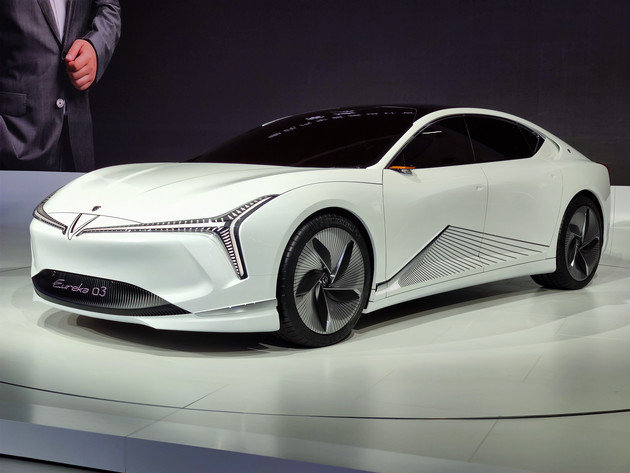
Neta Eureka 03 Concept

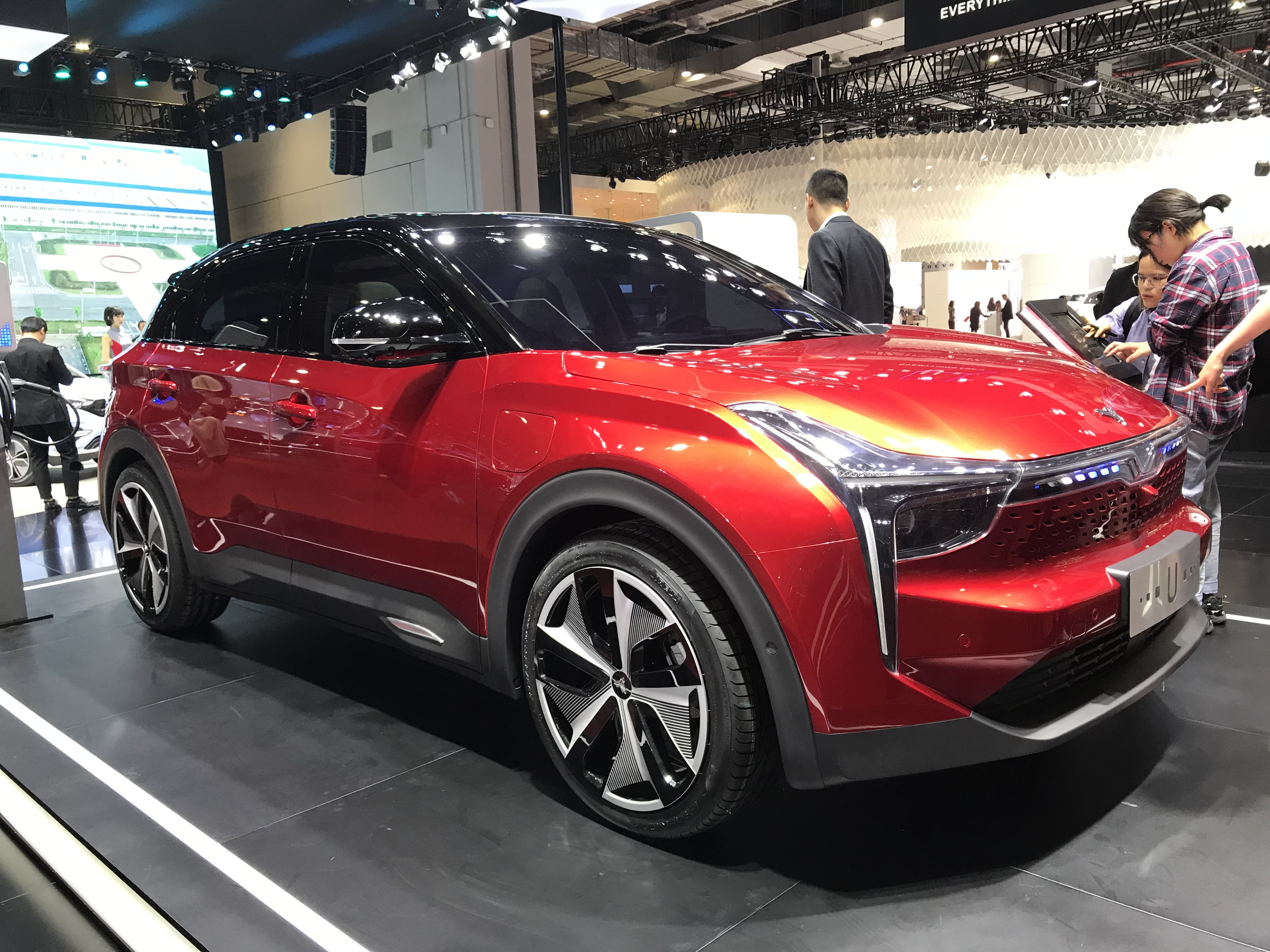
Neta U Concept

== Sales ==
Neta sales data
Year	Sales
2018	1,206
2019	11,212
2020	15,509
2021	69,674
2022	152,073
2023	127,496
2024	87,684
2025	1,213

== Related disputes ==
=== Auto insurance disputes ===
In 2024, several Neta owners said that the insurance premiums for Neta vehicles risen sharply, and they were even rejected by several auto insurance companies. Some auto insurance companies responded that most Hozon car buyers use them as online ride-hailing vehicles, and the high rate of accidents caused by online ride-hailing vehicles has greatly increased the cost of auto insurance companies. Industry experts pointed out that Hozon Auto cannot communicate or reach an agreement with the insurance company on premium issues, it will affect Hozon Auto's sales volume.

=== Business Difficulties ===
In February 2024, several Hozon Auto employees broke the news on workplace social media, CEO Zhang Yong's previous promise to pay year-end bonuses in the first week of work was not fulfilled, and he was even told that the payment would be delayed by one month. Zhang Yong later responded that the annual performance payment coefficient and amount are being confirmed, emphasizing that employees' wages, social security and bonuses have never been delayed since 2016. He also said that "a small number of employees in the company are not used to hard times" and "it is necessary to pass on the coldness to everyone."

On October 15, 2024, another employee broke the news that he had not received last month's salary; Hozon Auto responded to the media the next day, saying that the company's front-line employees' salaries were paid on time, but the salary structure of mid- and senior-level employees was being adjusted recently, so the salary of some employees was slightly delayed. At the end of the same month, an online media outlet received information from a Hozon Auto employee that Hozon Auto had begun implementing a salary cut plan for all R&D personnel. The salary cuts for more than 1,000 employees range from 5% to 30%, which should correspond to the earlier "salary structure adjustment". Hozon Auto responded that the salary increase plan is part of the company's goal of achieving positive cash flow as soon as possible. The company also launched a full-staff equity incentive plan, allocating 5% of the shares to all employees as incentives; the company will also implement organizational streamlining, Cutting redundant staff, focusing on business, flattening management and other cost-cutting and efficiency-enhancing measures. On November 7, media reported that Hozon Auto launched a large-scale layoff that day, with the layoff rate reaching up to 70%, but the company denied it.

On November 14, 2024, Hozon Auto told the media that the company is promoting major strategic adjustments, including streamlining its structure and focusing on its core business. To further improve operational efficiency, the company will allocate more resources to overseas market expansion and plans to achieve positive operating cash flow in February 2025. Hozon Auto also announced that it has reached a cooperation agreement with Nanning Industrial Investment Group, which will provide financial support for the company's supply chain. On December 6, Hozon Automobile announced that Zhang Yong would no longer serve as the company's CEO and would become a company consultant; the company's founder and chairman Fang Yunzhou would concurrently serve as CEO. Fang Yunzhou issued an internal letter to all employees on the same day, admitting that the company was in operational difficulties and stating that he "bears the primary responsibility and deeply apologizes to everyone."

In March 2025, Neta Auto proposed at a supplier conference that 70% of its debts would be converted into equity of its parent company Hozon Auto, and the remaining 30% would be repaid in interest-free installments in cash, but this plan was not approved by all suppliers. The company's executives also disclosed at the meeting that in addition to poor management, starting from the second quarter of 2024, the bank withdrew loans from the company's account for two consecutive quarters, resulting in the company's failure to successfully go public and the rupture of the capital chain, which directly caused the operating crisis at the end of the year.

On May 7, industrial robot company Efort announced that Hozon New Energy and its subsidiaries agreed to pay approximately RMB 49 million in arrears in batches, which was interpreted by the outside world as a partial solution to Neta Auto's funding problems; However, a few days later, Hozon New Energy was filed for bankruptcy review by an advertising company. As of June 2025, more than 100 pieces of information on persons subject to execution have been stored, with a total amount of execution exceeding RMB 150 million.

At the end of May, the company's headquarters moved from Shanghai's Putuo District to the Hongqiao Business District; however, on June 12, it was forced to move out of the location and all employees worked from home. On June 13, Hozon New Energy officially entered the bankruptcy review process. On August 11, Hozon New Energy was listed as a "dishonest debtor".

=== Fake sales controversy ===
According to a July 2025 report by Reuters, Neta, inflated its reported sales figures by arranging for cars to be insured before they were delivered to customers. Between January 2023 and March 2024, Neta booked early sales of at least 64,719 vehicles using this method—accounting for more than half of the 117,000 units it reported sold during that period. The vehicles were insured in advance and sent to dealers, who would later transfer the insurance to actual buyers. The practice began in late 2022, reportedly to qualify for expiring government EV subsidies.

== See also ==
- Automobile manufacturers and brands of China
- List of automobile manufacturers of China
