= Neta GT =

Battery electric sports car

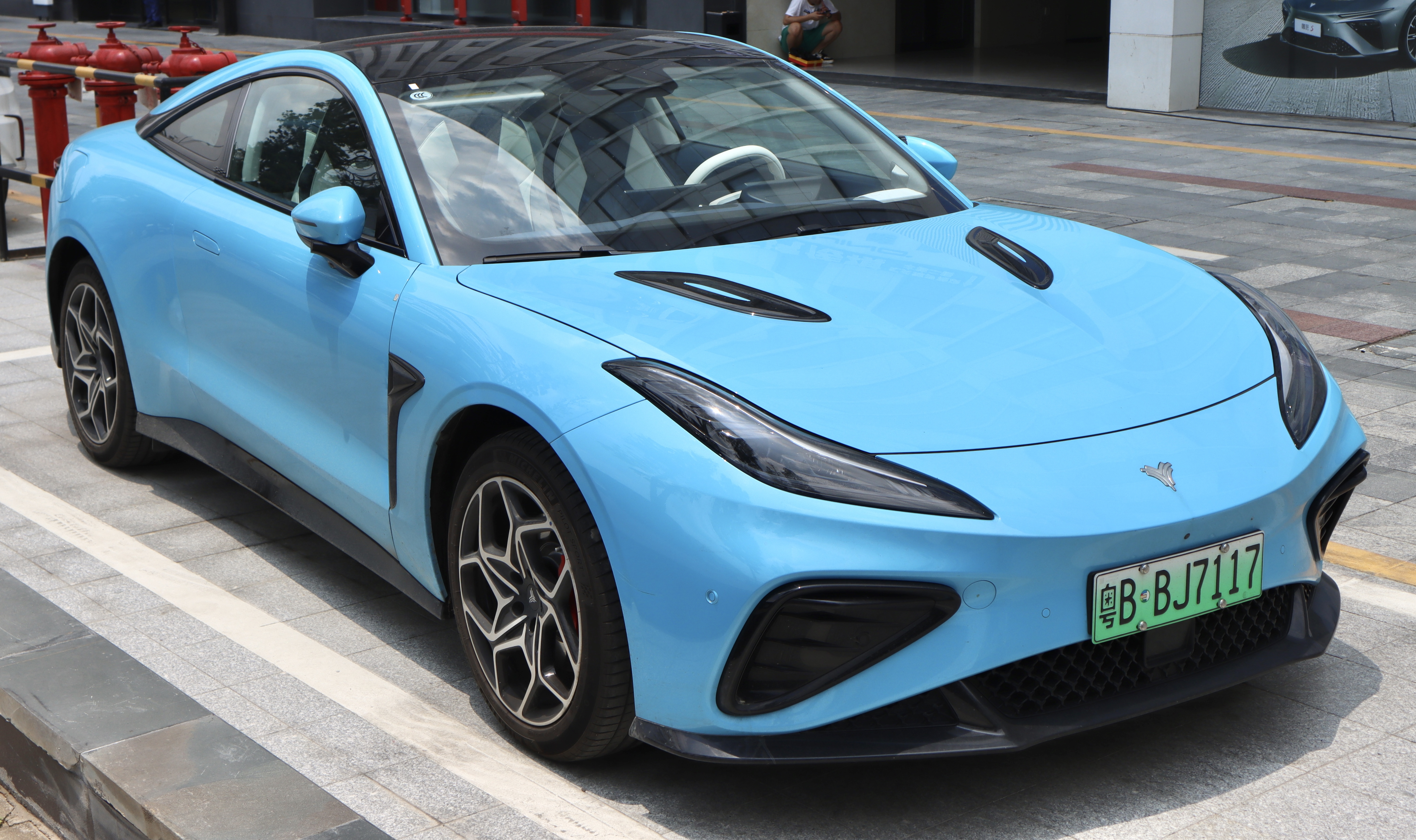

Overview
- Manufacturer: Hozon Auto
- Production: 2023–2024
- Assembly: China: Yichun, Jiangxi

Body and chassis
- Class: Sports car (S)
- Body style: 2-door coupé
- Layout: Rear-motor, rear-wheel drive; Dual-motor, all-wheel drive
- Platform: Shenhai platform

Powertrain
- Electric motor: AC permanent magnet synchronous: 1xPMSM (RWD); 2xPMSM (AWD)
- Power output: RWD: 170 kW (230 hp; 230 PS); AWD: 340 kW (460 hp; 460 PS)
- Transmission: 1-speed direct-drive
- Battery: Lithium ion
- Electric range: 560–580 km (350–360 mi)

Dimensions
- Wheelbase: 2,770 mm (109 in)
- Length: 4,715 mm (185.6 in)
- Width: 1,979 mm (77.9 in)
- Height: 1,415 mm (55.7 in)
- Curb weight: 1,820–1,950 kg (4,010–4,300 lb)

The Neta GT (Chinese: 哪吒GT; pinyin: Nézhā GT) is a battery electric sports car produced by Hozon Auto under the Neta (Nezha) brand, a Chinese all-electric car manufacturer. Neta vehicles are manufactured by the Zhejiang Hezhong New Energy Automobile Company.

== History ==
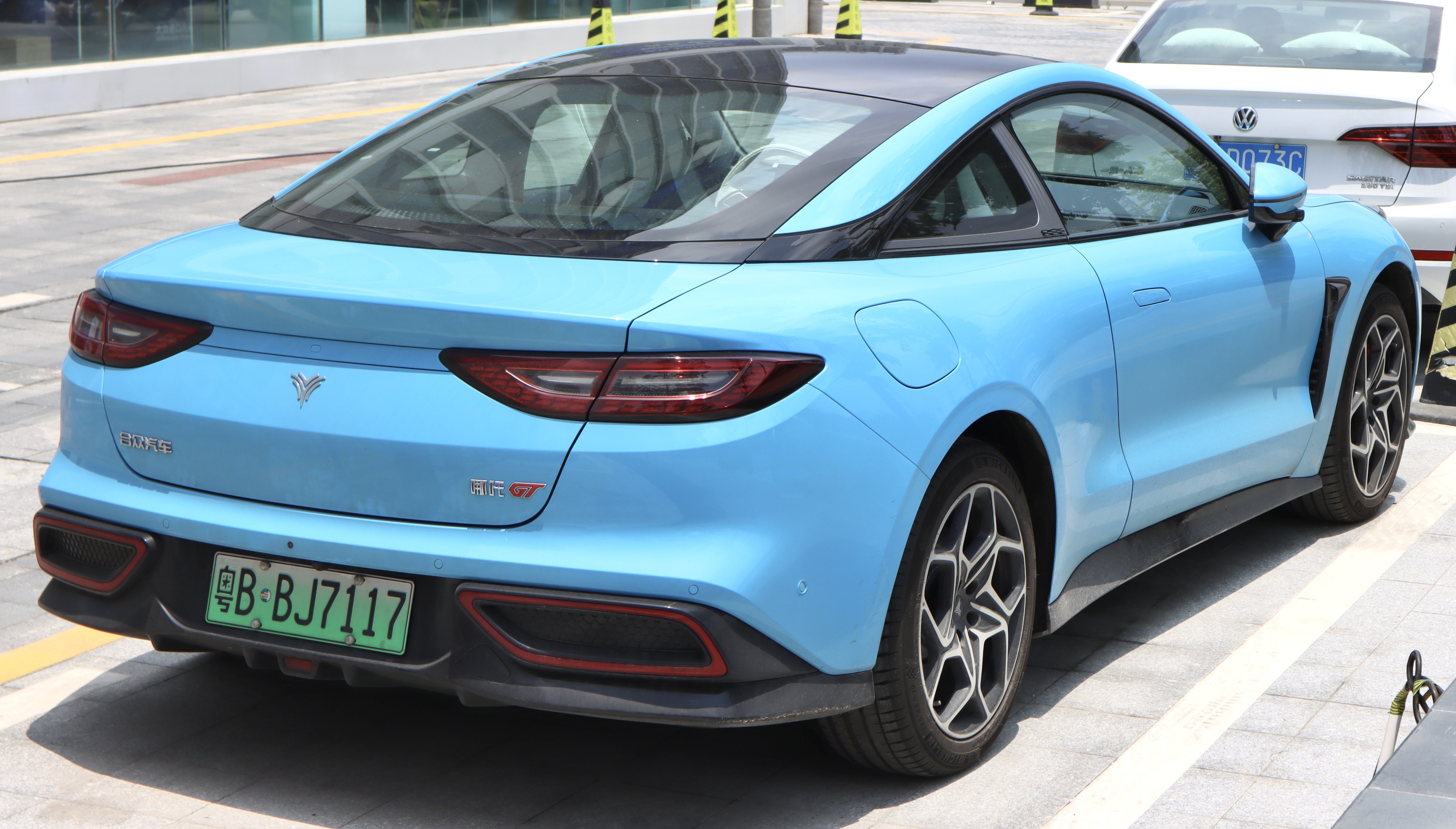
Rear view

In December 2022, the Chinese company Hozon Auto presented another model expanding the portfolio of the Neta brand, which has so far been created by 4 electric cars. At the time of the presentation, the car was called Neta E. The vehicle took the form of a 2-door sports coupe, unusual for electric cars, with a slim, aggressively outlined silhouette distinguished by slanted headlights. The exterior was also enriched with imitation air intakes and a rear diffuser. The car is based on the Shenhai platform shared with the Neta S.

A characteristic feature of the GT is the retractable external door handles that improve aerodynamics and a camera system enabling semi-autonomous driving. As in the related Neta S, the radar monitoring the vehicle's surroundings has been hidden at the top edge of the windshield. In April 2023, the manufacturer presented the full specification of the vehicle, and at the same, the car's name was changed to the Neta GT. The multi-colored passenger compartment is dominated by the 17.6-inch vertical touchscreen infotainment system.

The GT was created for the mainland Chinese market, with plans to start production and sales in the first quarter of 2023. The manufacturer wants to emphasize the uniqueness of the concept of an affordable sports-electric car, which has no direct competitor in China at the time of its debut.

== Specifications ==
The GT is a fully electric car; buyers can choose from two drive variants. The basic one, transferring power to the rear axle, develops 228 hp, while the top AWD engine reaches 456 hp. The basic battery pack allows the user to drive about 560 km (350 mi) on a single charge, and the top one up to 580 km (360 mi).

== Sales ==
Year	China
2023	9,010
2024	151
2025	22
