= Neta U =

Battery electric compact crossover SUV

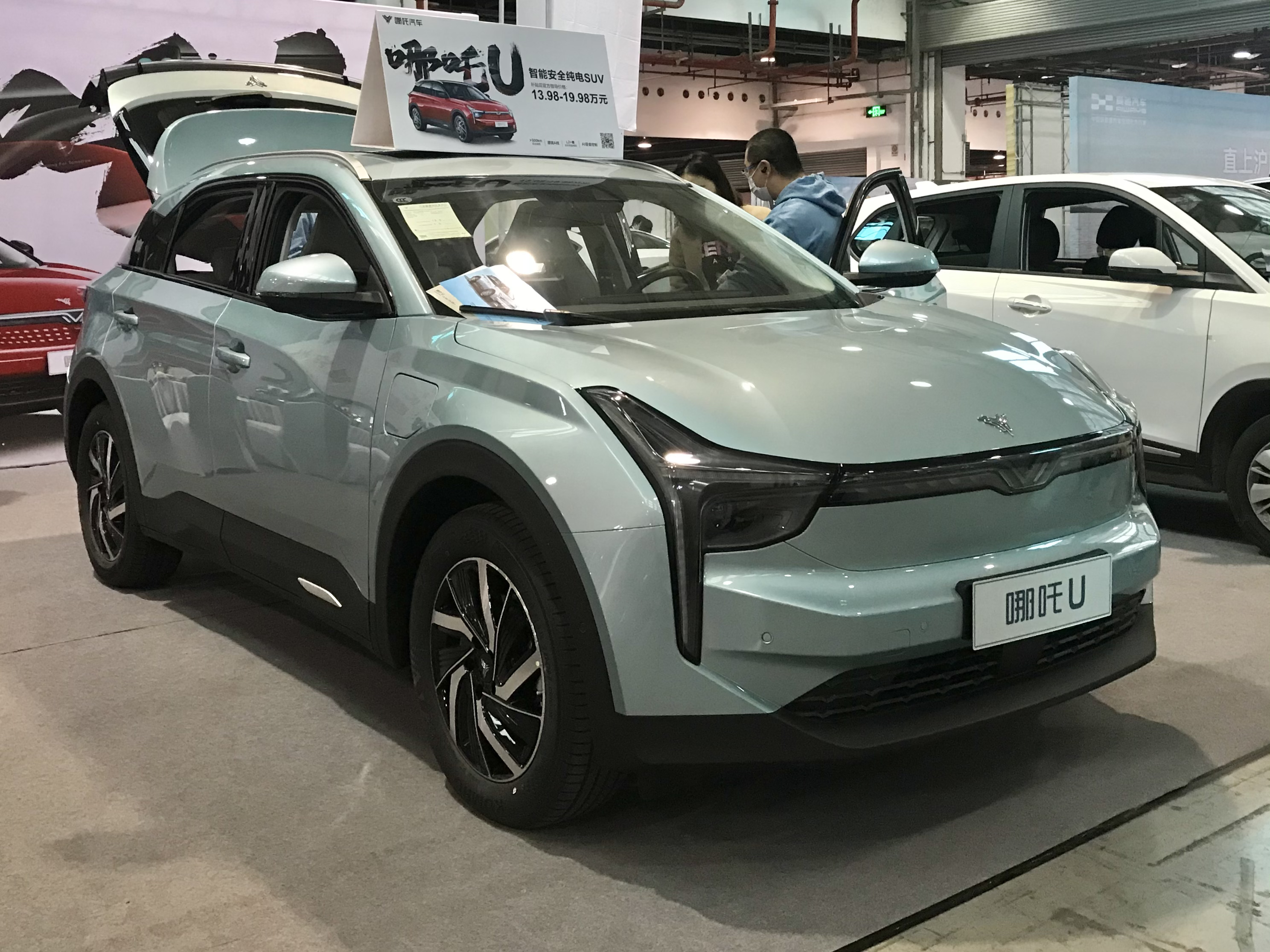

Overview
- Manufacturer: Hozon Auto
- Also called: Neta X
- Production: 2020–2025 (China); 2023–2026 (export)
- Assembly: China: Yichun, Jiangxi (Hozon New Energy Automobile Co., Ltd. Yichun Branch); Thailand: Bangkok (BGAC, X); Indonesia: Bekasi (HIM, X)

Body and chassis
- Class: Compact SUV (C-segment)
- Body style: 5-door crossover SUV
- Layout: Front-motor, front-wheel drive Dual-motor, all-wheel drive

Powertrain
- Electric motor: Permanent magnet synchronous
- Power output: 120–150 kW (161–201 hp; 163–204 PS); 120–170 kW (161–228 hp; 163–231 PS) (Neta U PRO); 220 kW (295 hp; 299 PS) (Neta U 4WD)
- Battery: 54.32—81.57 kWh NMC (Neta U); 51.8—64 kWh LFP (Neta X)
- Electric range: 400–660 km (249–410 mi) (CLTC)

Dimensions
- Wheelbase: 2,770 mm (109.1 in)
- Length: 4,530 mm (178.3 in)
- Width: 1,860 mm (73.2 in)
- Height: 1,628 mm (64.1 in)
- Kerb weight: 1,680–1,779 kg (3,704–3,922 lb)

The Neta U (Chinese: 哪吒U; pinyin: Nézhā U) is a battery electric compact SUV produced by Hozon Auto after 2019 under the Neta (Nezha) brand, a Chinese all-electric car marque, manufactured by the Zhejiang Hezhong New Energy Automobile Company. It was later renamed to Neta X after a facelift.

== Overview ==
Hozon Auto launched the Neta U during the 2019 Shanghai Auto Show in April 2019, it was built on Hozon Auto's EPT2.0 platform, which is Hozon's second generation powertrain platform.

The Neta U was originally previewed as the NETA U pre-production concept at launch and was changed to Neta U in August 2018. It went on sale at the end of 2019.

The power of the Neta U comes from a front positioned electric motor producing 150 horsepower (112 kW; 152 PS) and 310 N⋅m (229 lb⋅ft), mated to a battery pack capable of a range up to 500 kilometres (310 mi).

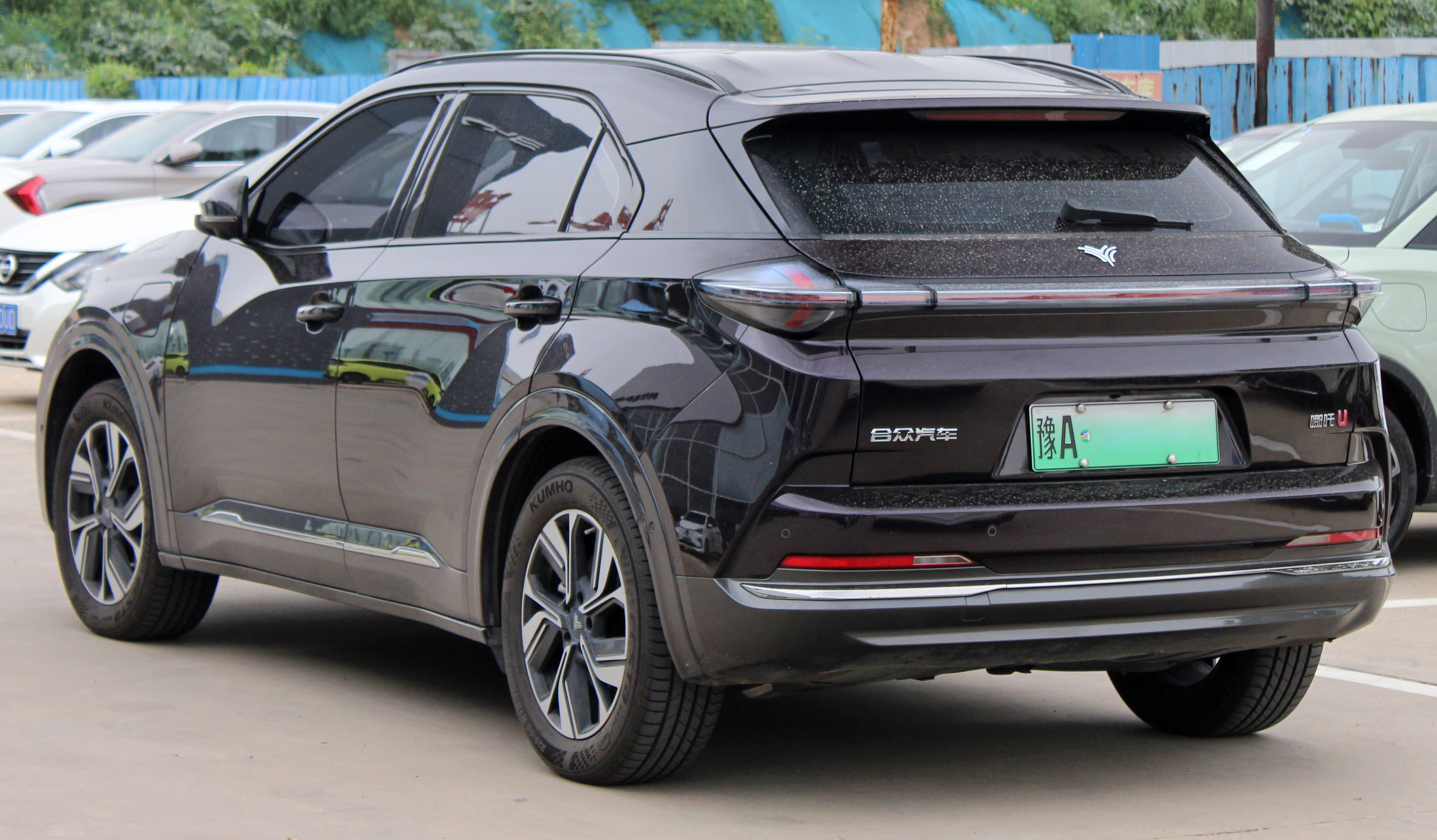
Rear view

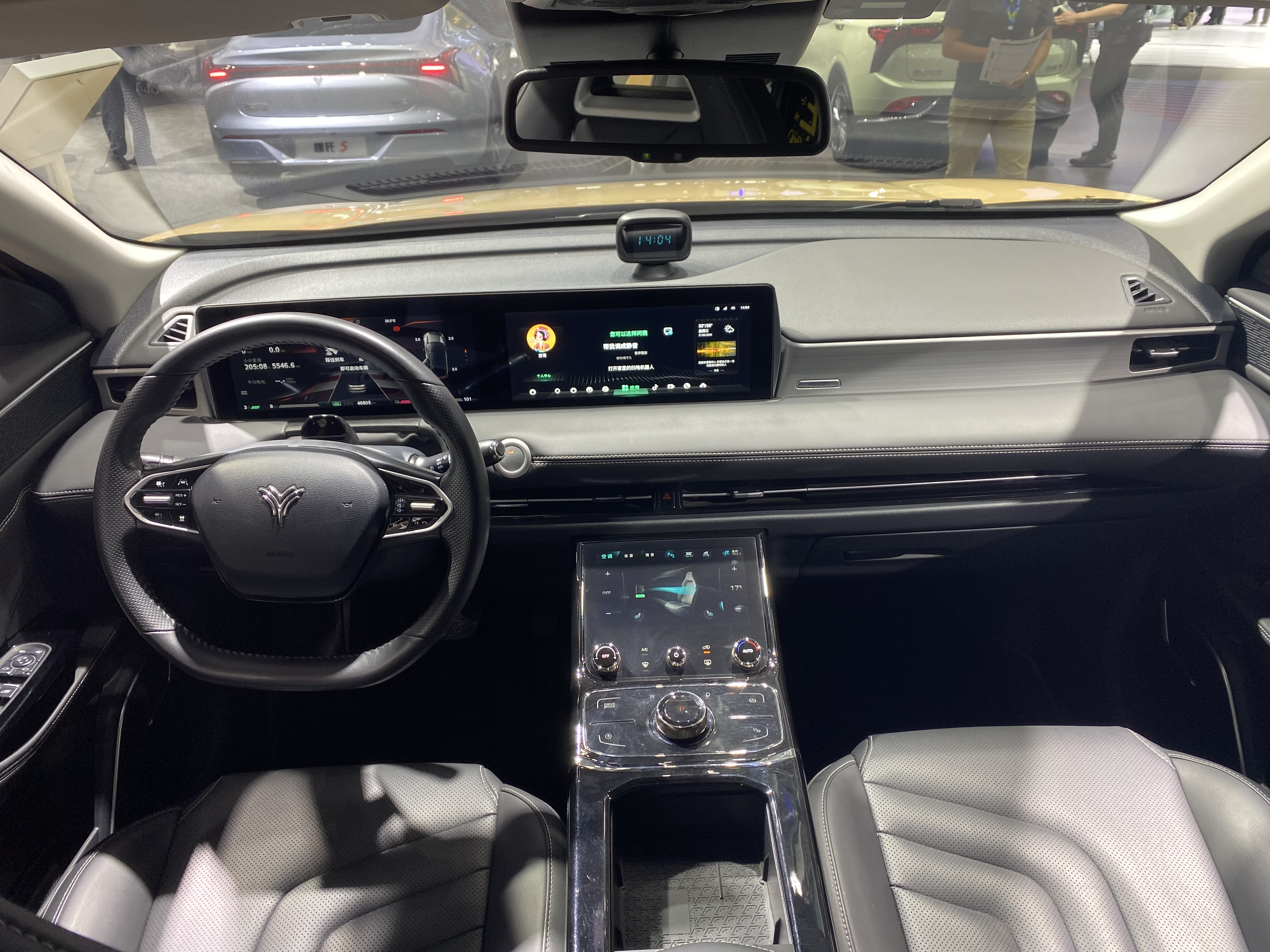
Interior

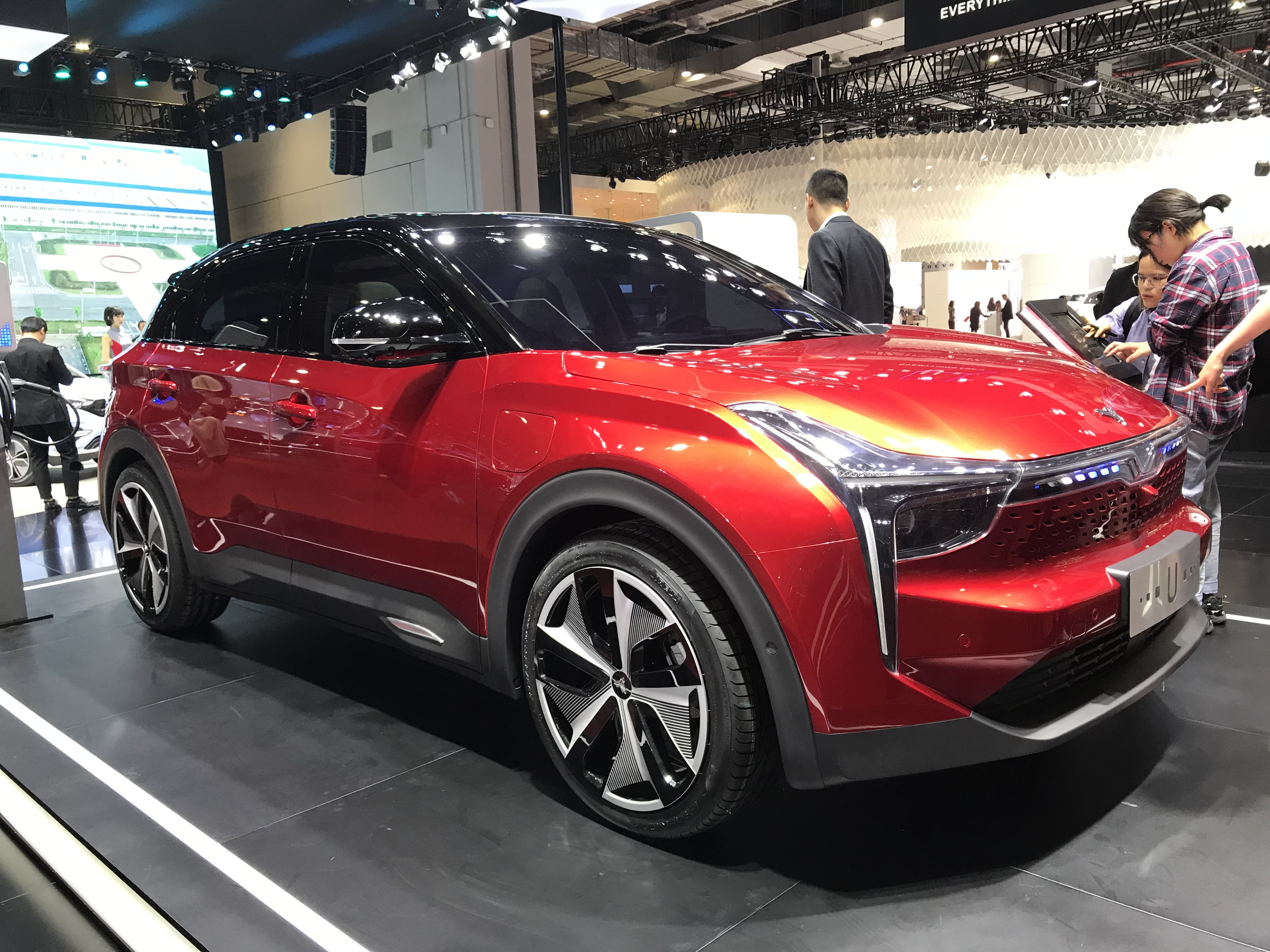
Neta U Concept

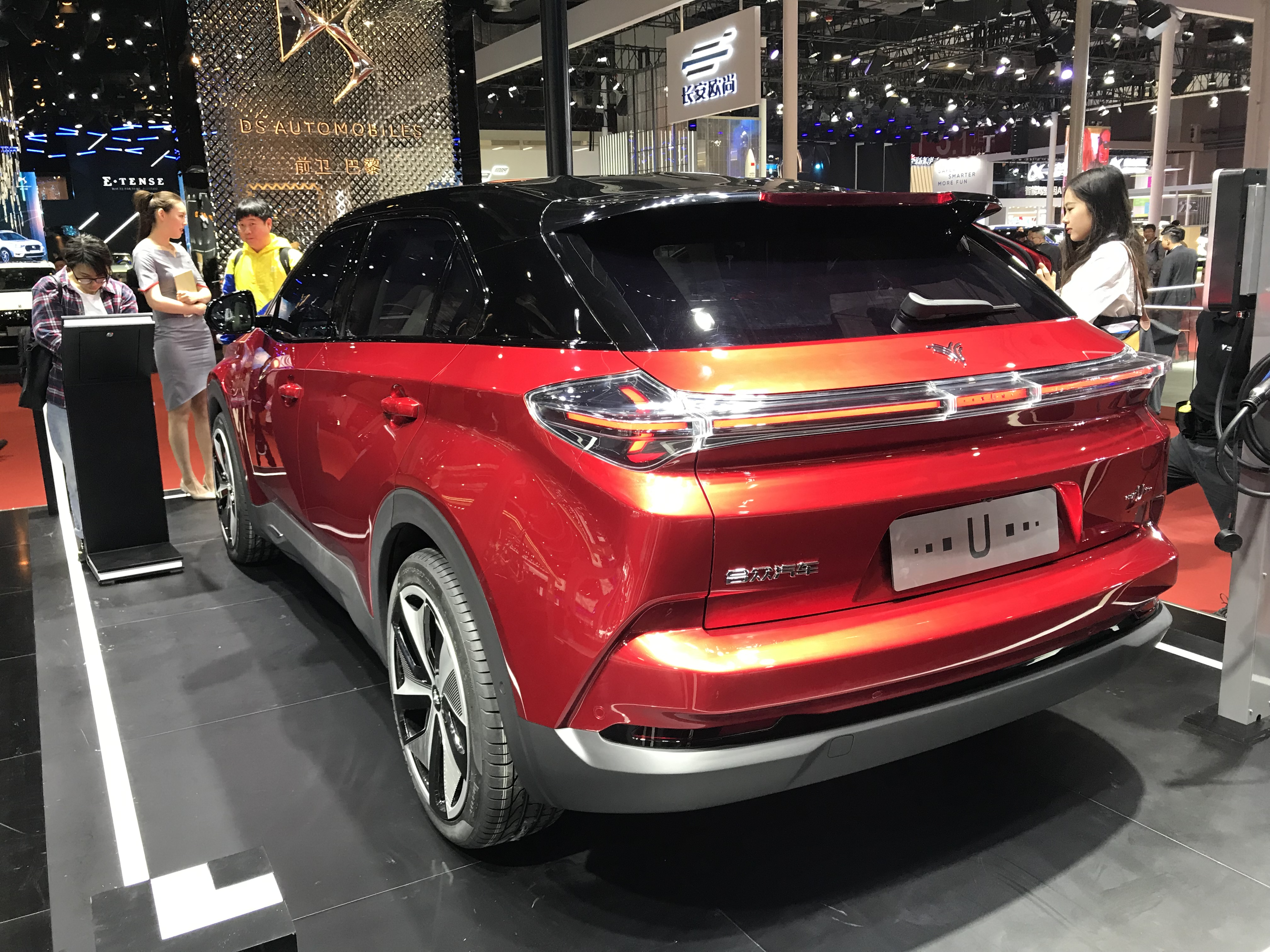
Rear view

== Neta U-Saloon ==
The Neta U-saloon is a purpose-built version of the Neta U, revealed in December 2020, designed for vehicle hire services. The model features a 4-seater configuration, removing the front passenger seat. Interior features include adjustable rear seats, footrests for the rear passengers, a large projector screen, wireless charging for the back seats, and additional storage and cup holders. The prototype on display also features a sliding door that opens forward. The model is available in both front-wheel drive and all-wheel drive variants, with the front-wheel drive model producing 204 horsepower (152 kW; 207 PS) and 310 N⋅m (229 lb⋅ft) and the all-wheel drive variant producing 299 horsepower (223 kW; 303 PS) and 530 N⋅m (391 lb⋅ft) with a range of 660 km (410 miles). The model is available in China in 2021.

== Neta X ==
Originally planned to be sold as the Neta U Max, the name was later unveiled to be Neta X. The Neta U received a facelift version and name change to Neta X in 2023. The Neta X is powered by an electric motor producing 120 kW with a top speed of 150 km/h.

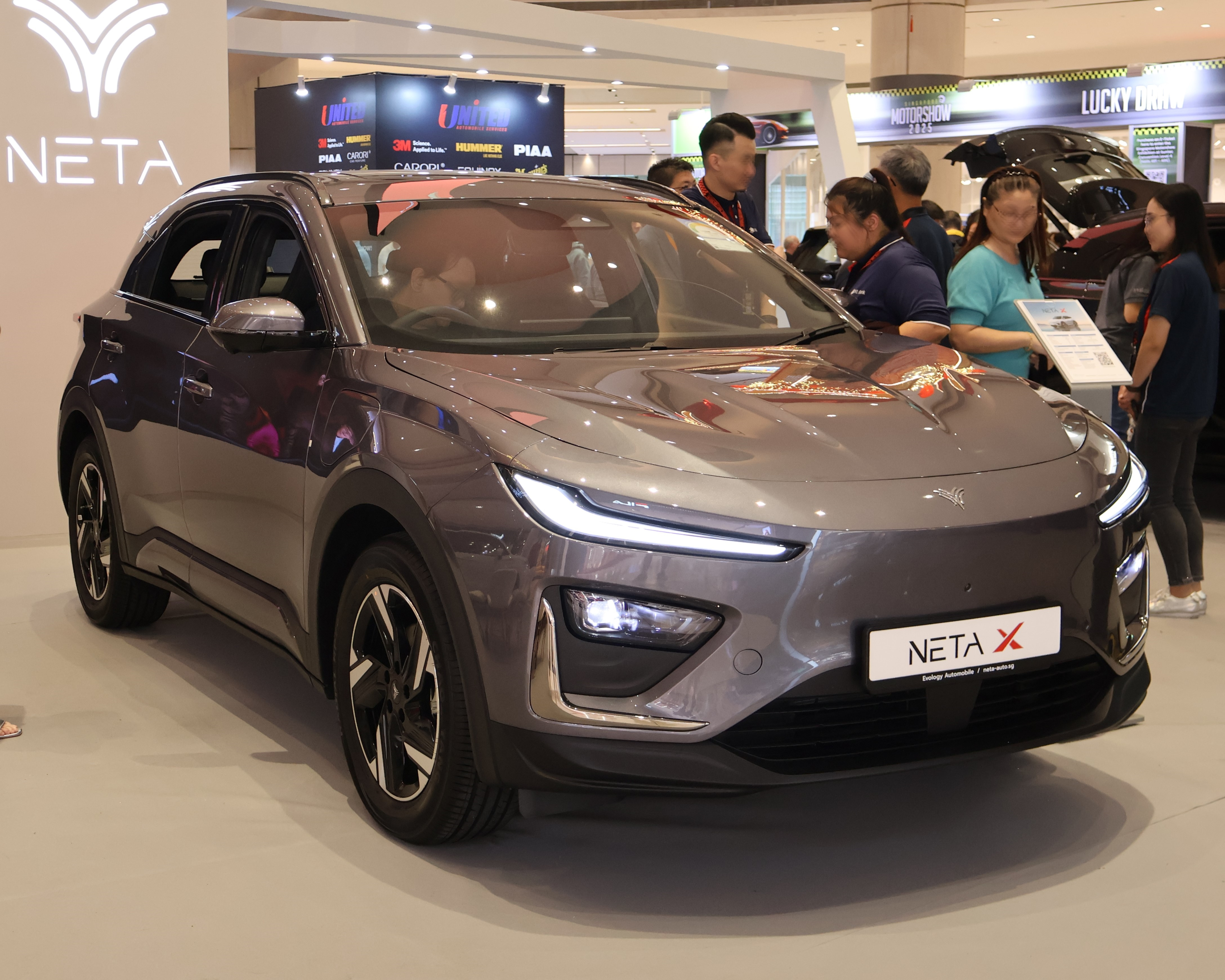
Neta X

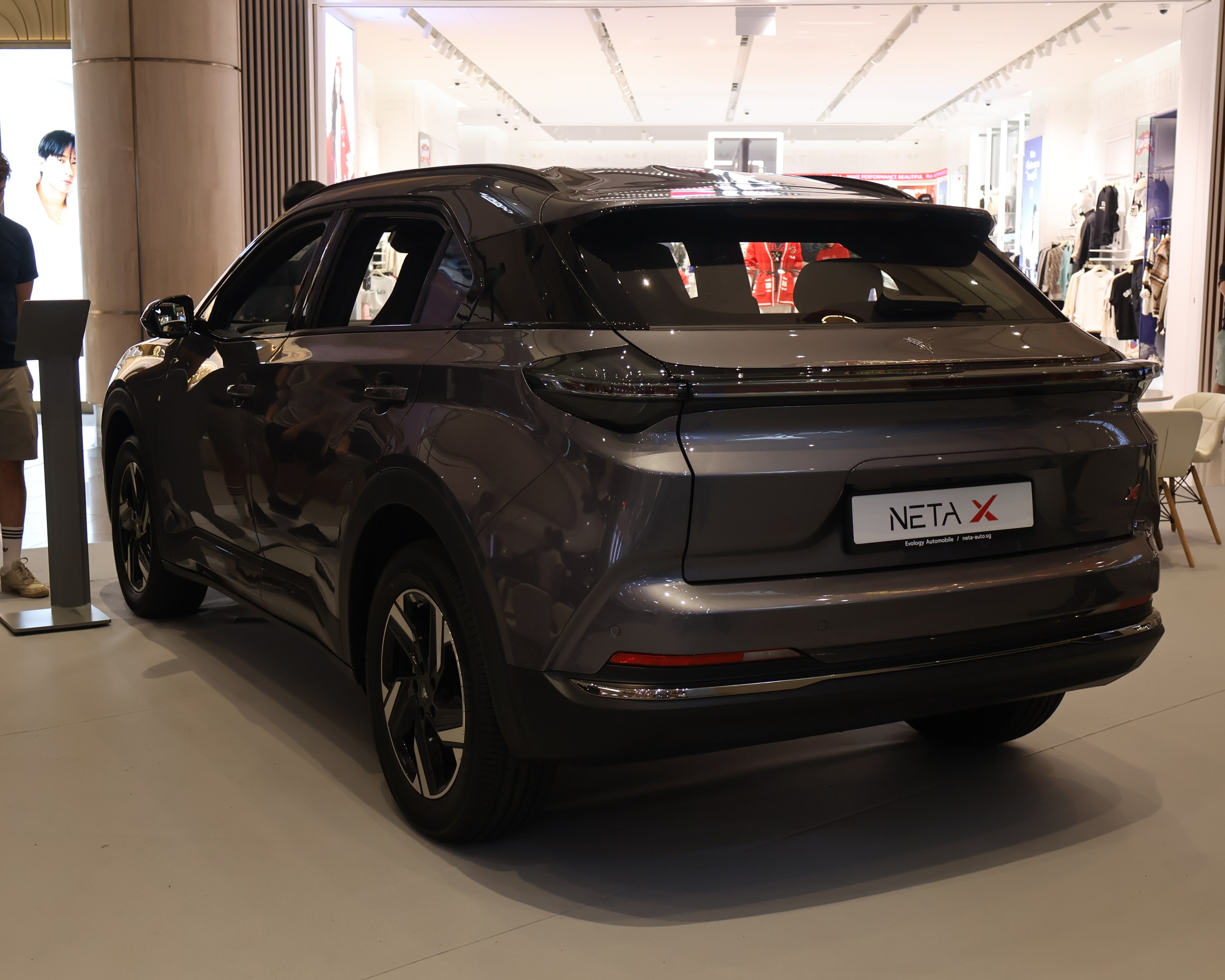
Rear view

== Markets ==
=== Indonesia ===
The X was introduced in Indonesia at the 31st Gaikindo Indonesia International Auto Show in July 2024. It was launched on 27 September 2024 in two variants: 500 Elite and 500 Supreme; both using the 63.5 kWh battery pack.

=== Malaysia ===
The X was launched in Malaysia on 25 July 2024, after being previewed at the Malaysia Autoshow in May 2024. It is available in three variants: 400 Comfort, 400 Luxury, and 500 Luxury.

=== Singapore ===
The X was launched in Singapore on 15 January 2025, coinciding with Neta's entry to the Singaporean market. It is available in the sole unnamed variant using the 62 kWh battery.

=== Thailand ===
The X was launched in Thailand on 25 July 2024, as a fully imported model from China. It is available in two trim levels: Comfort and Smart, using the 51.8 and 62 kWh battery packs.

== Sales ==
Year	China	Indonesia	Malaysia (Note: Figures based on registration (Malaysia))	Thailand
2020	8,281			
2021	69,674			
2022	75,298			
2023	34,884			
2024	15,370	95	41	1,382
2025	124	117	71	835
