= Neta S =

Battery electric mid-size sedan

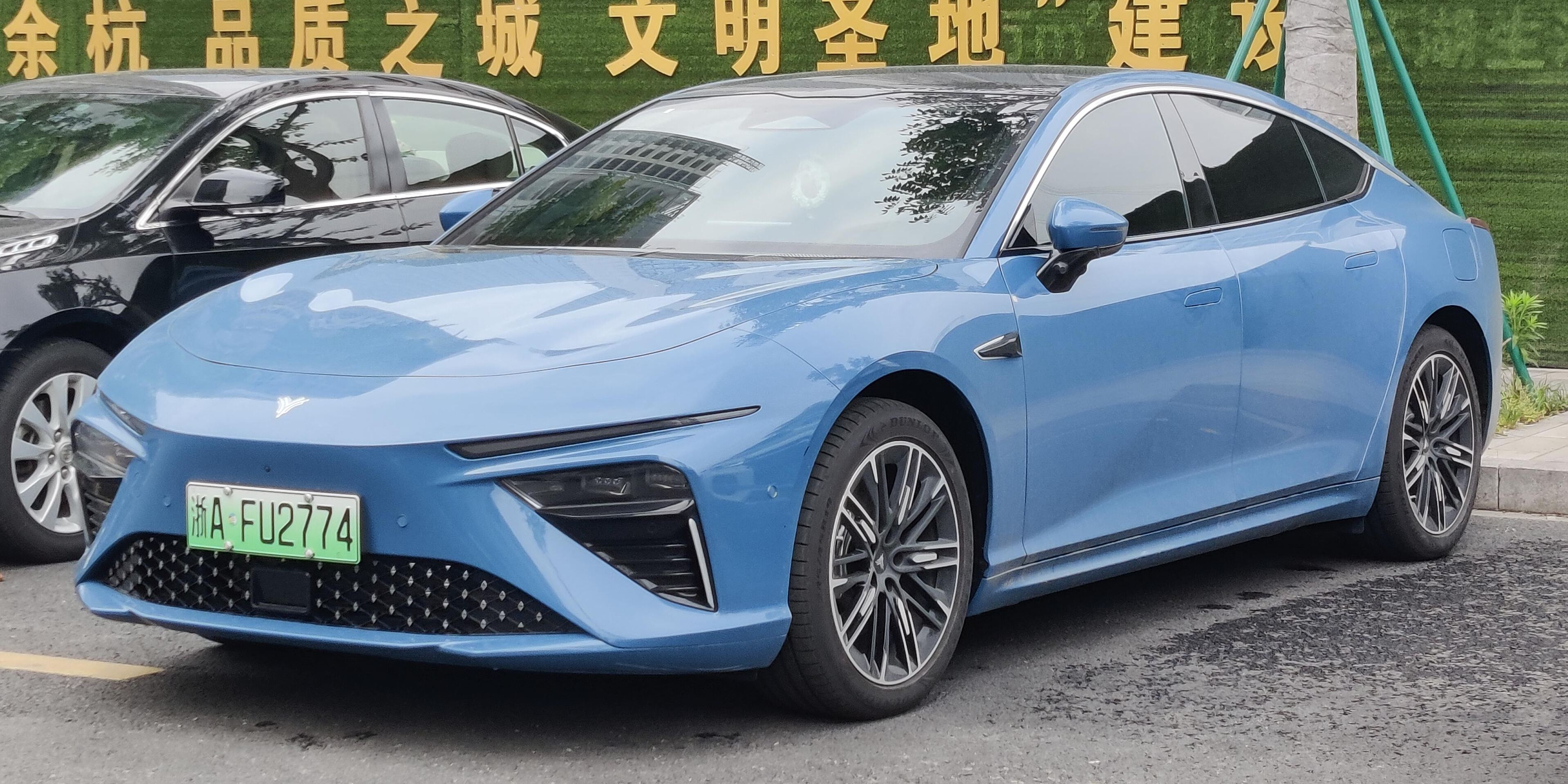

Overview
- Manufacturer: Hozon Auto
- Production: 2022–2024
- Assembly: China: Yichun, Jiangxi

Body and chassis
- Class: Mid-size car (D)
- Body style: 4-door sedan; 5-door station wagon
- Layout: Rear-motor, rear-wheel-drive; Dual-motor, all-wheel-drive; Front-engine, rear-motor, rear-wheel drive (EREV)
- Platform: Shanhai
- Doors: Conventional (standard models); Scissor front + conventional rear (Yaoshi EV Special Edition)

Powertrain
- Engine: Petrol range extender: 1.5 L I4 (EREV)
- Electric motor: 1× or 2× permanent magnet synchronous
- Power output: 227 hp (230 PS; 169 kW) (RWD); 455 hp (461 PS; 339 kW) (4WD)
- Hybrid drivetrain: Range-extended electric (EREV)
- Battery: 64.46 – 91 kWh lithium-ion battery (EV); 43.51 or 43.88 kWh Hozon EPT4.0 lithium-ion (EREV)
- Electric range: EV: 520–1,100 km (323–684 mi) (NEDC); EREV: 310 km (193 mi) (NEDC, electric only)

Dimensions
- Wheelbase: 2,980 mm (117 in)
- Length: 4,980 mm (196 in)
- Width: 1,980 mm (78 in)
- Height: 1,450 mm (57 in)
- Kerb weight: 2,130 kg (4,696 lb)

The Neta S is a battery electric mid-size sedan produced by the Chinese electric car manufacturer Hozon Auto under the Neta (Nezha) brand.

== Concept car ==
The Hozon Auto launched the Neta S during the 2021 Shanghai Auto Show in April 2021. Originally previewed by the Neta Eureka 03 Concept, the Neta S received a restyled front end compared to the concept car. In concept form, the Eureka 03 is able to accelerate from 0 to 100 km/h (0 to 62 mph) in four seconds and has a range of 800 kilometres (500 mi) on the NEDC cycle. According to the company, the Eureka 03 also has a Level 4 autonomous driving system.

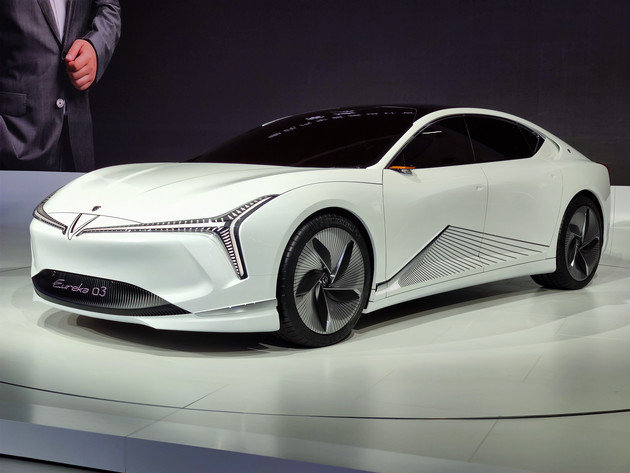
Neta Eureka 03 concept

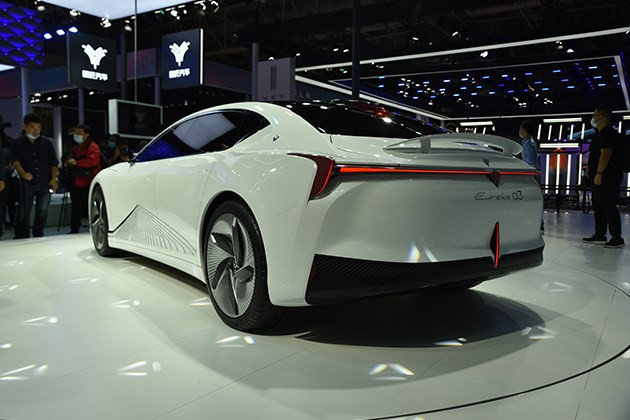
Rear view
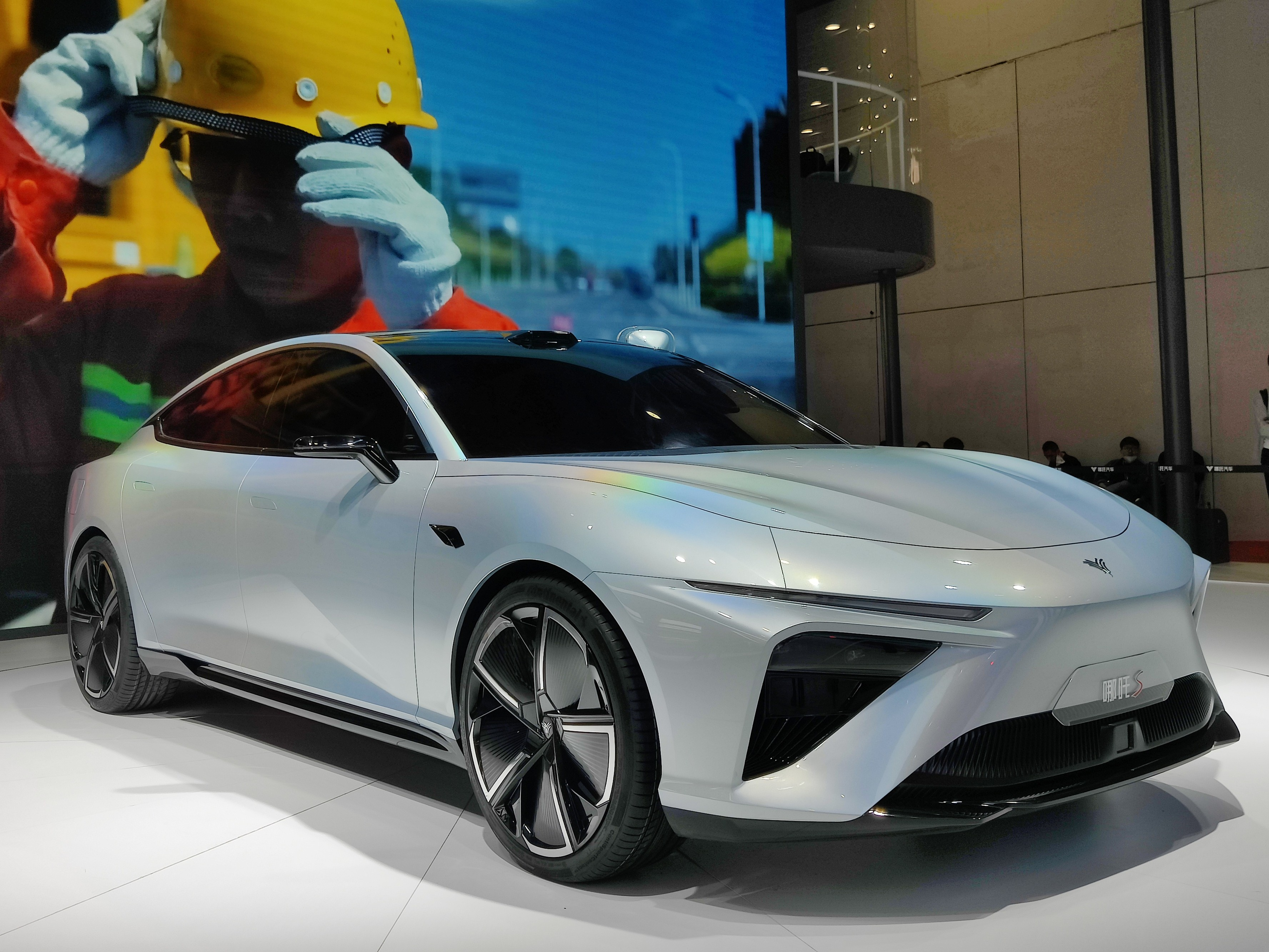
The Neta S pre-production concept in 2021.

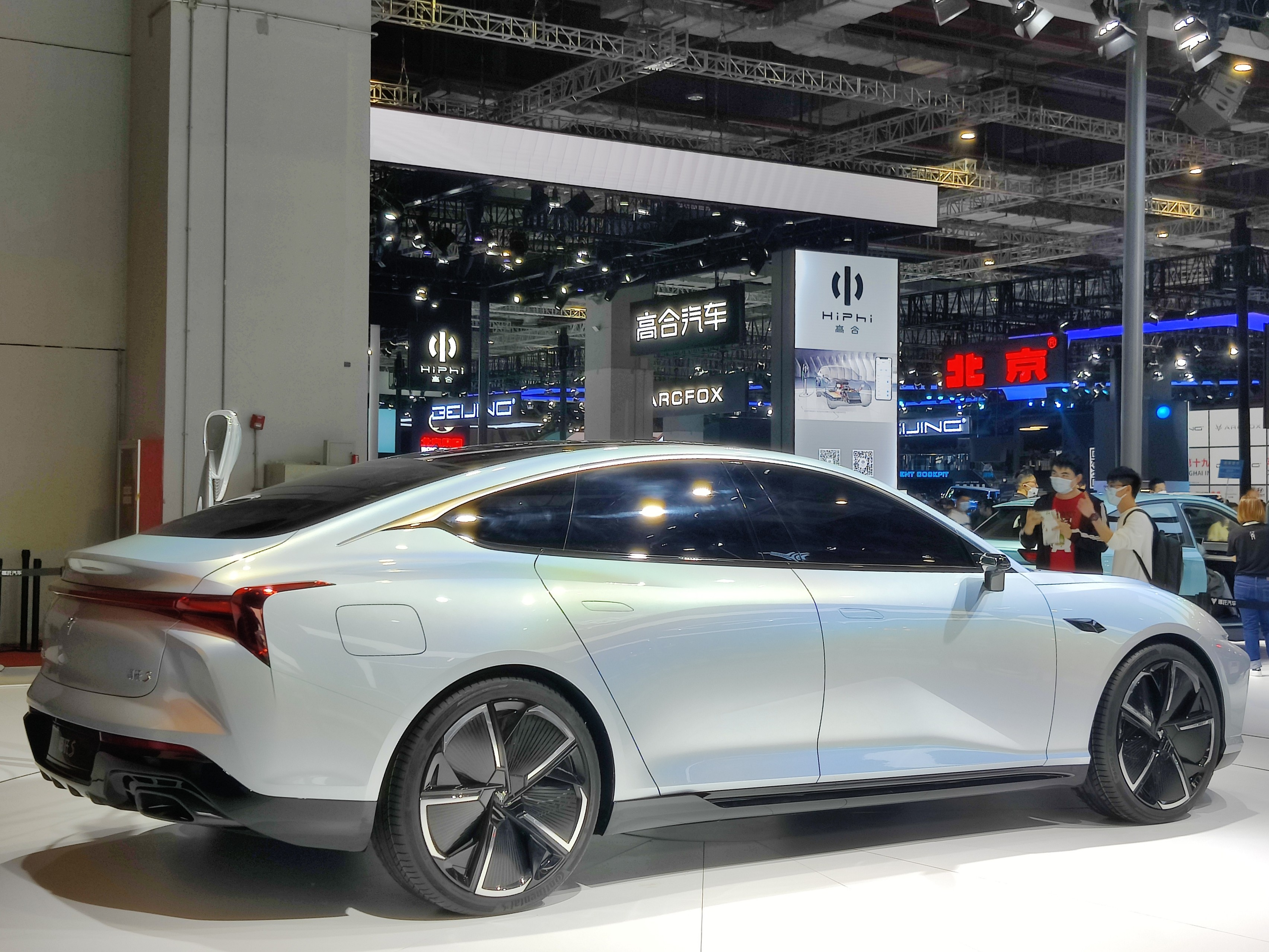
Rear view

== Production model ==
The Neta S was officially revealed on 20 April 2022 in production form.

According to Hozon Auto, the Neta S is equipped with three lidars, five automotive millimeter-wave radars and six cameras. It has a range of 800 kilometres (500 mi) with the base model and 1,100 kilometres (680 mi) for the top of the trim model. Electronics for the Neta S are codeveloped with Huawei.

The Hunting Edition station wagon model was revealed on 8 August 2024. It adopts a shooting brake design according to Neta and has a boot space of 593 L (20.9 cu ft) that expands to 1,295 L (45.7 cu ft) when the 40:20:40 rear seats are folded down.

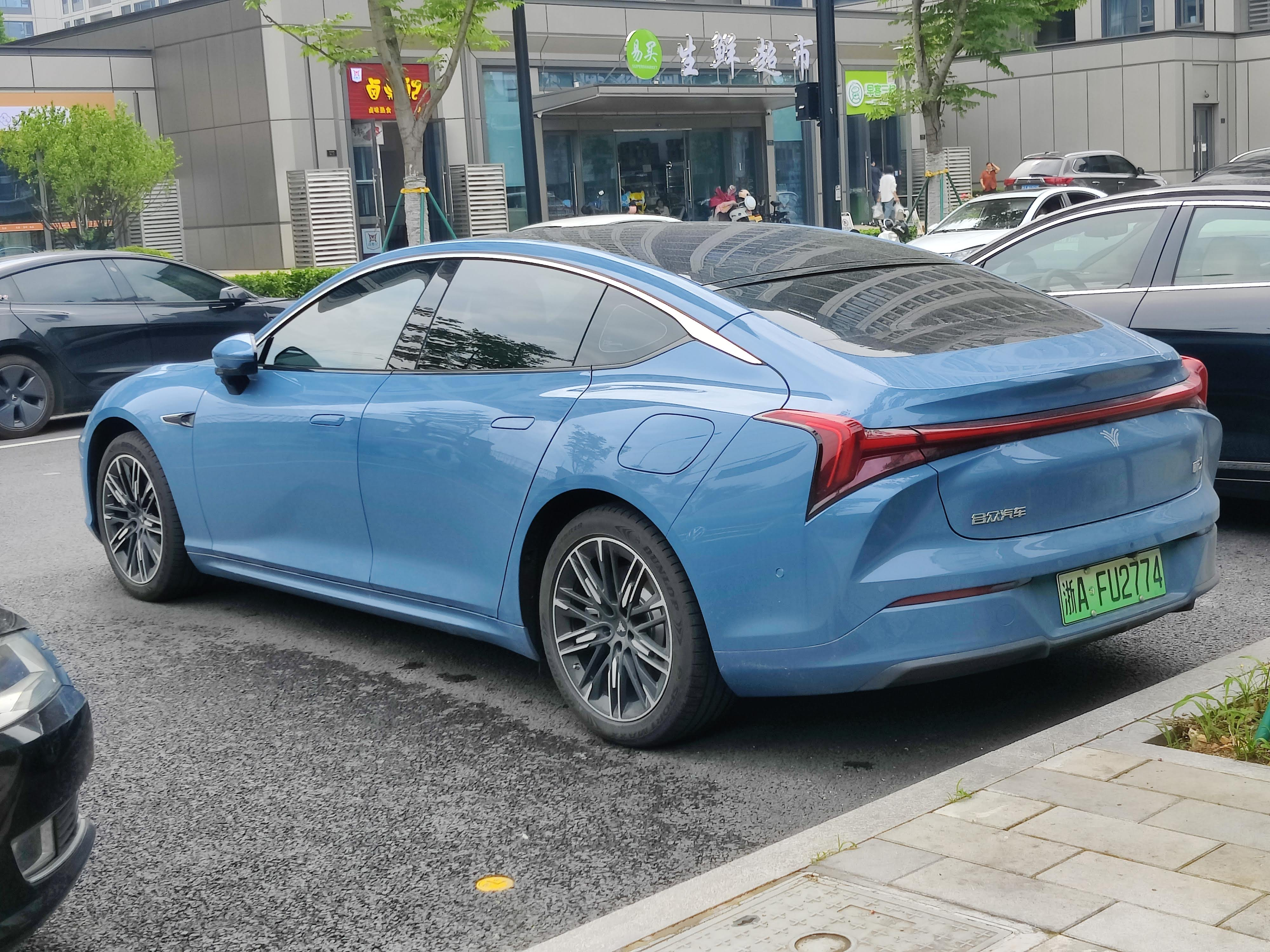
Rear view

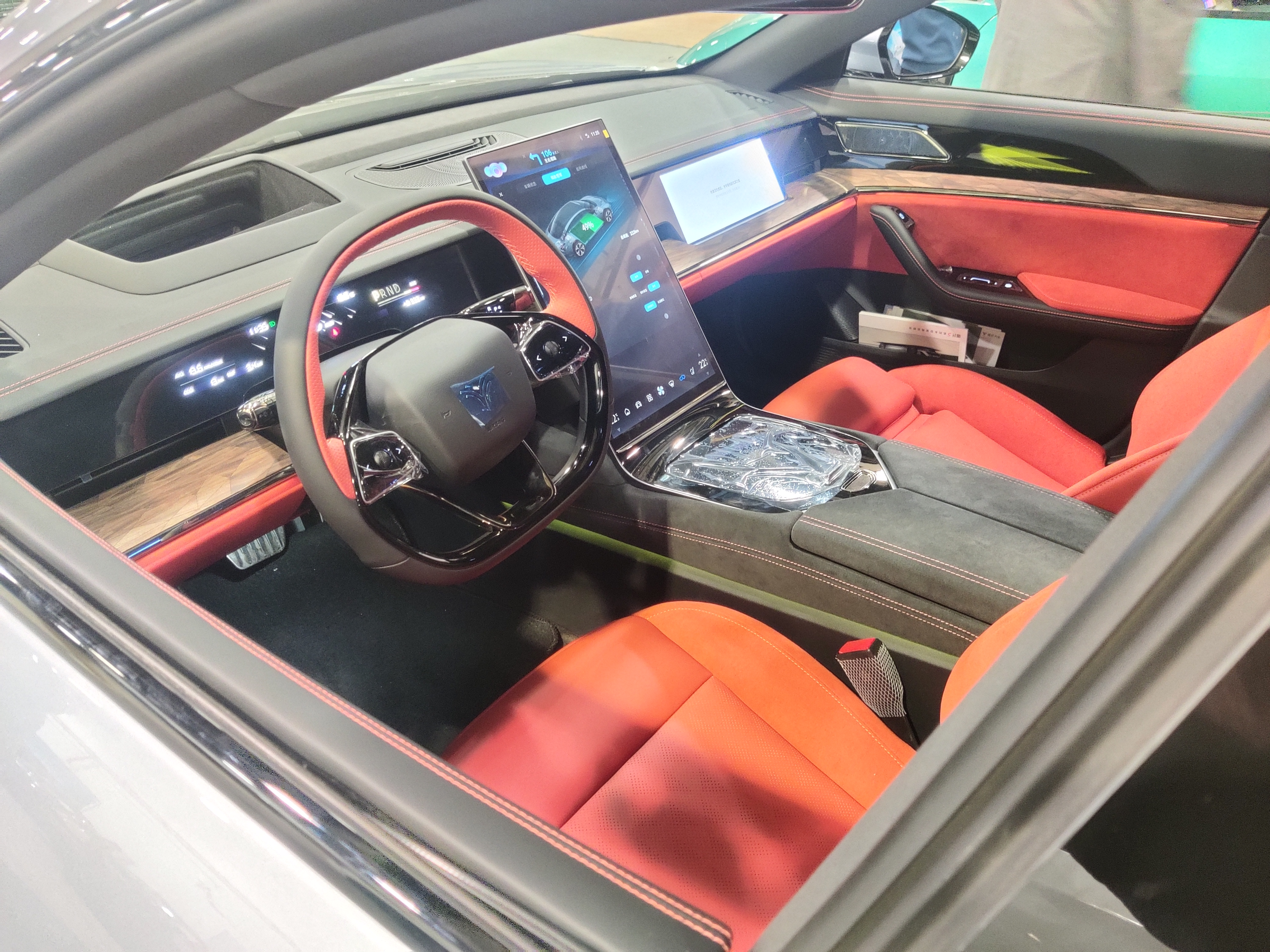
Interior

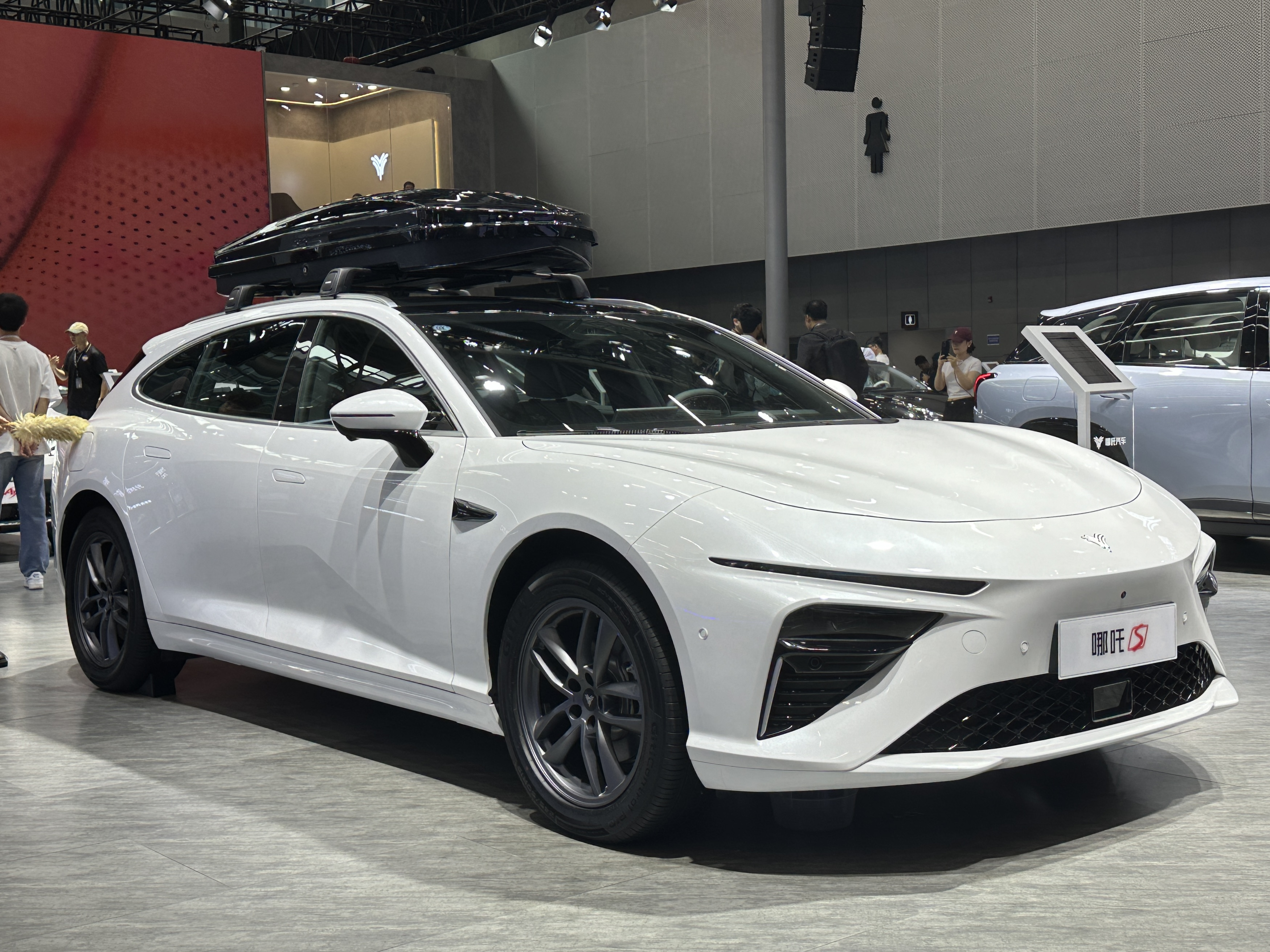
Neta S Hunting Edition

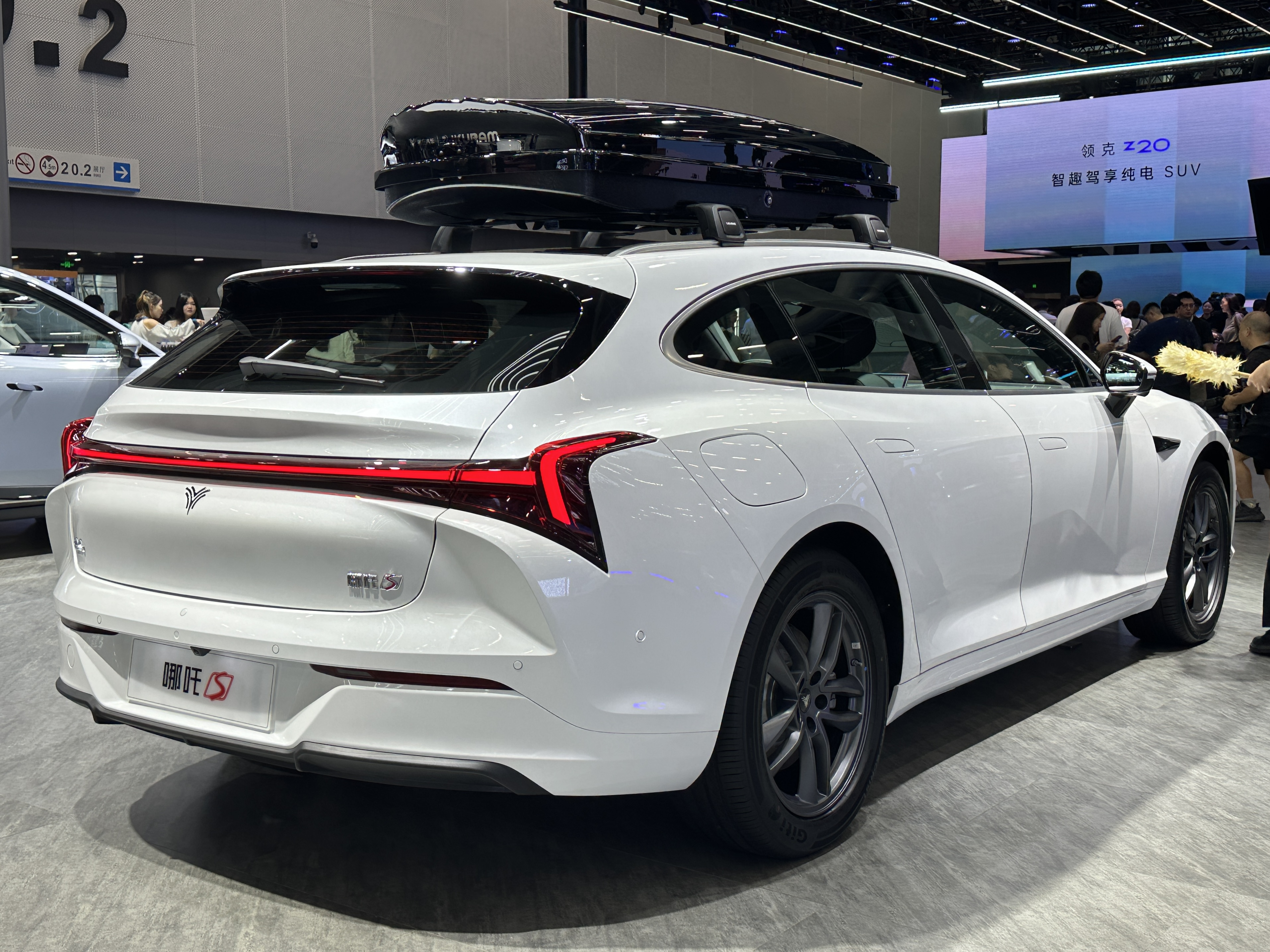
Rear view

== Foreign markets ==
During the 39th Thailand International Motor Expo in December 2022, Neta displayed the Neta S. The company plans to launch Neta S in the Thai market in the future.

== Sales ==
Year	China		
Year	EV	EREV	Total
2022	1,134	1,071	2,205
2023	6,286	13,767	20,053
2024	4,179	2,462	6,641
2025	78	133	211
