= List of thermal incidents in electric vehicles =

Since at least 2010, fires and thermal incidents have been reported in cars, buses, boats, and other electric vehicles. This is a list of fires in electric vehicles attributed directly to a fault or failure in the main traction battery cause by a manufacturing or maintenance defect (excluding crashes, intentional damage, and other external causes.) None of the following lists are, or ever will be, comprehensive lists of all fires related to that vehicle or brand, and some lists will be longer purely because they receive more attention than others.

== A Future EV ==
About 6 a.m. on 17 November 2010, a fire broke out on the vehicle deck of the MS Pearl of Scandinavia on its way from Oslo to Copenhagen. The ferry's fire sprinkler system put out the fire before any of the crew or the 490 sleeping passengers were injured and the ship could dock in Copenhagen under its own power. It was determined that the cause of the fire was a short circuit in the plug of an extension cord used to charge a rebuilt Nissan Qashqai, converted into a battery electric vehicle by the Sakskøbing based company A Future EV. The company owner was returning from Norway where the vehicle had started the approval process for general sale there, and had used an extension cord to charge the vehicle from a general purpose power outlet on the ferry. The ferry operator DFDS Seaways consequently prohibited vehicle charging on board its ferries while the investors withdrew their support for the vehicle company forcing it into bankruptcy.

== Zotye M300 EV ==
A Zotye M300 EV operating as a taxicab caught fire in Hangzhou, China, in April 2011. No one was injured as the driver and two passengers evacuated the electric car in time. Due to the incident, the city authorities decided to halt all electric taxis on safety concerns, 15 of which were M300 EVs out of a fleet of 30 electric taxis. The city's official investigation team found the cause of the fire was the car's defective battery pack due to lack of quality control during manufacturing. According to the investigation report, the battery pack problems include: leaking of battery cells; damage of the insulation between battery cells and the walls of the aluminum container in which the cells were stacked; short circuits occurred within certain containers and those involving supporting and connecting parts. One of the stronger short circuits ignited the car's back seats. The lead investigators said that "...in sealing and packing the battery cells, in loading and unloading the battery stacks, insufficient attention had been paid to several safety factors; monitoring procedures had been inefficient or neglected in the process of manufacturing, battery charging/switching, and vehicle driving, failing to detect anomalies." The report added that the battery cells on the car were made by Zhejiang Wanxiang Group.

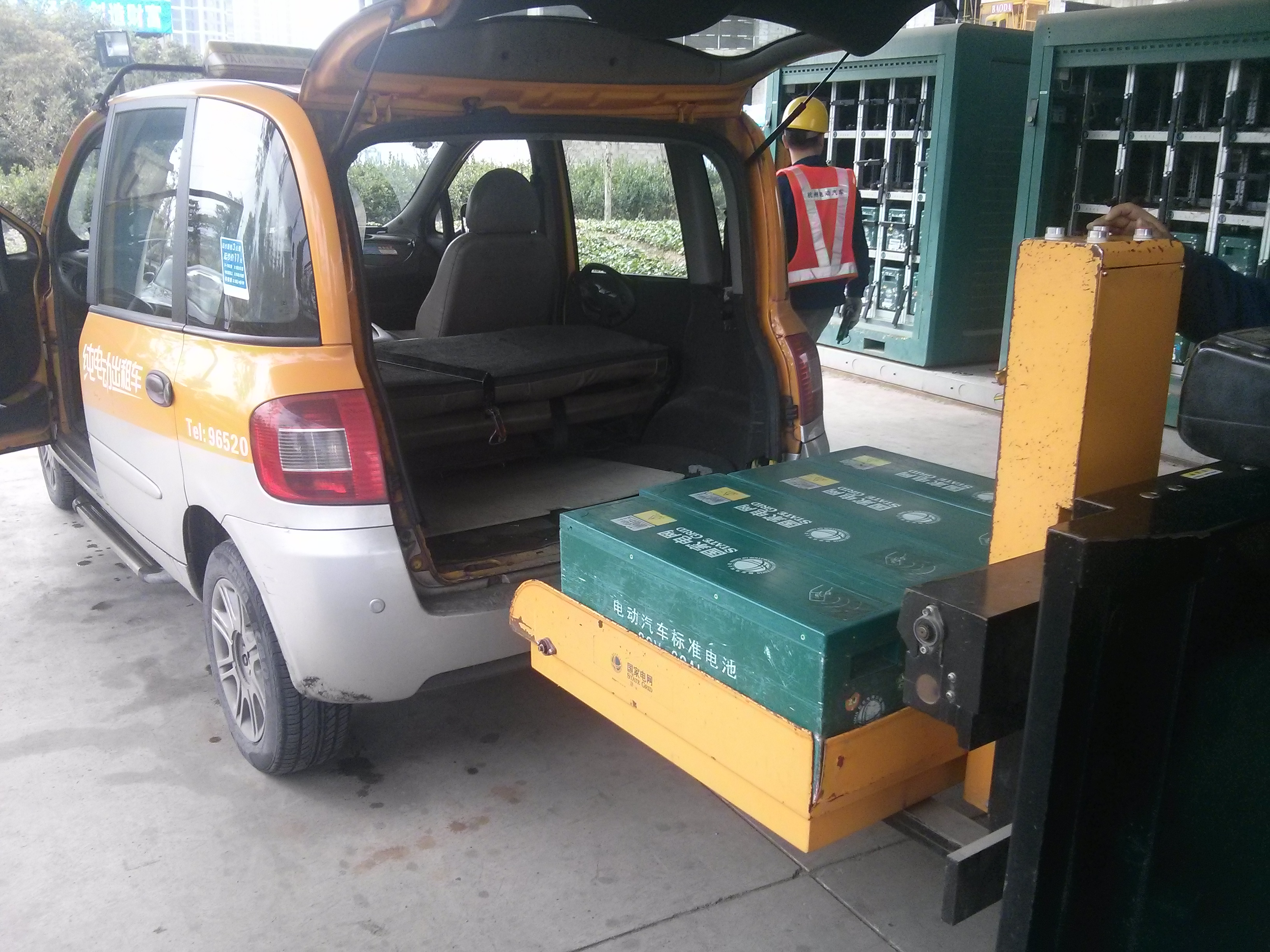
A Zotye M300 EV having its batteries replaced.

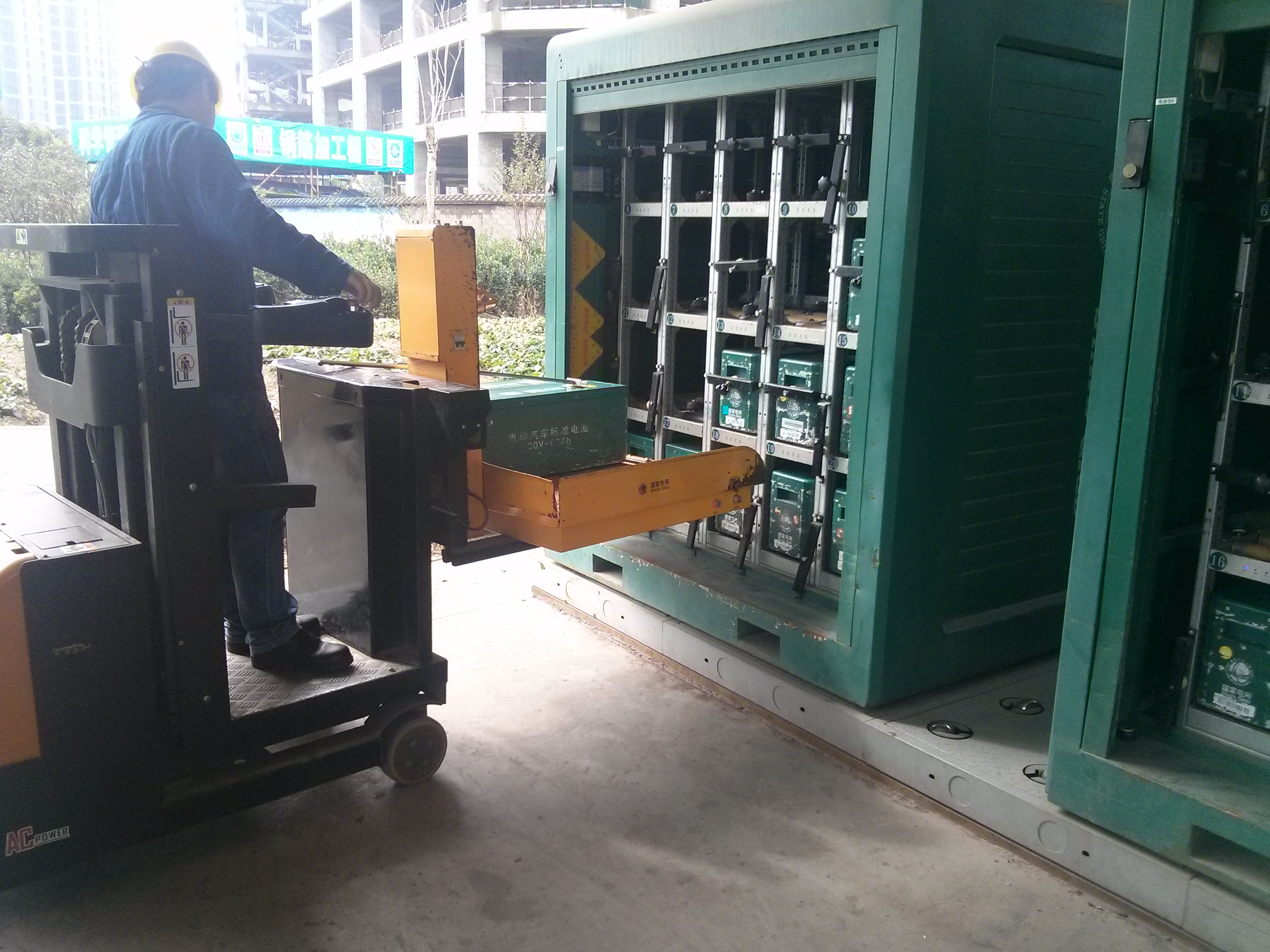
The batteries of a Zotye M300 EV being charged before being swapped.

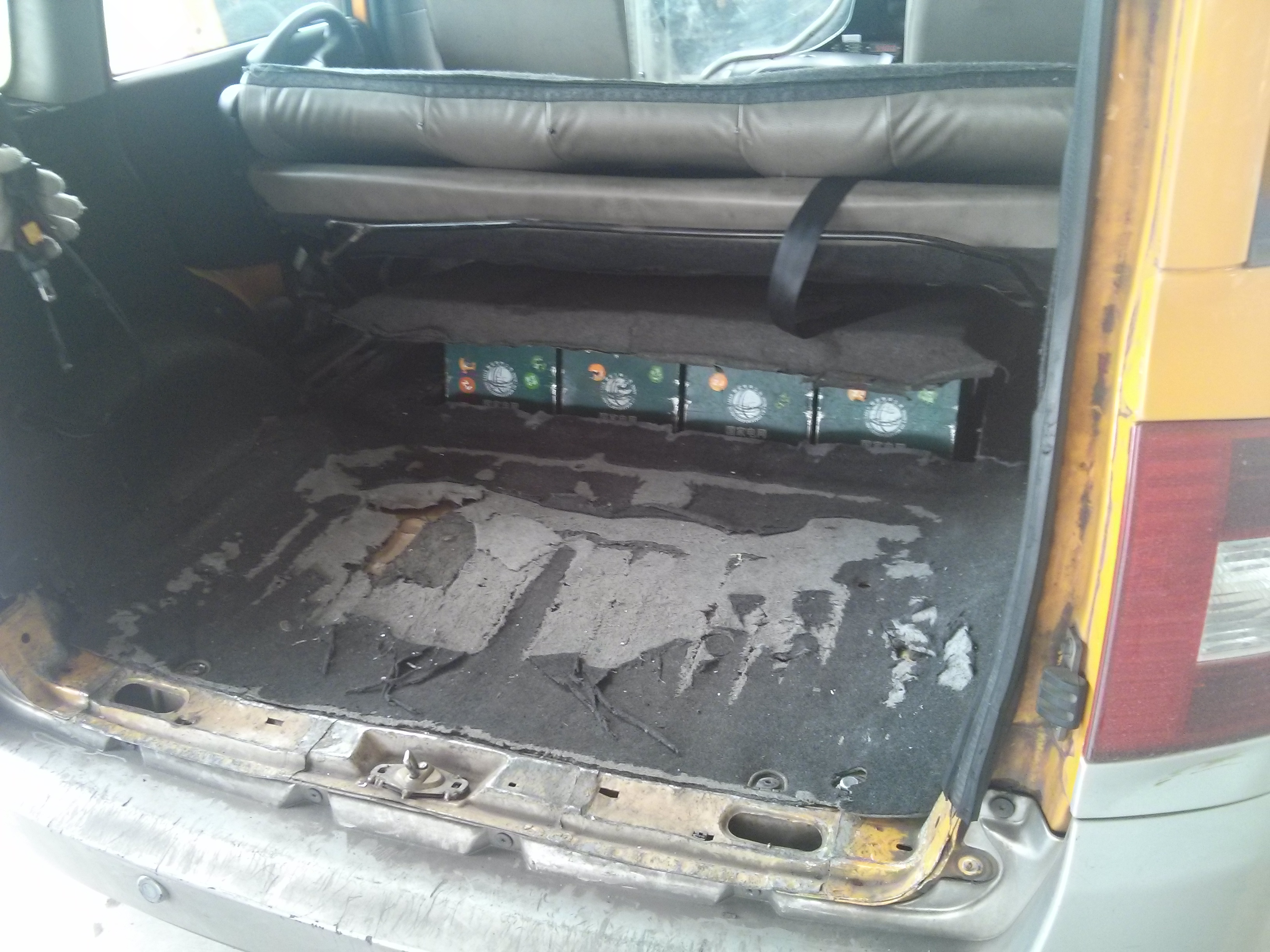
Wear and tear in the battery compartment of a Zotye M300 EV, located in the trunk.

== Chevrolet Bolt ==
As of August 2021, Electrek had compiled a list of 18 battery-related Chevrolet Bolt fires, and one possible-battery related fire. The frequent fires resulted in a recall of about 110,000 Chevrolet Bolt and Bolt EUV EVs from the 2017 through 2022 model years.

Even after the recall, several fires occurred in vehicles that had received the new software and been checked by a dealer — including one in a vehicle owned by a Vermont state lawmaker. Another fire happened in New Jersey, the company told CNBC. GM says it's still investigating the fires, and is asking owners who haven't gotten the fix to take their Bolts in to a dealer regardless. At least nine fires have been documented, and the company has started buying back some Bolts. Moreover, the company recommended that Bolt owners park their cars outside and at least 50 feet away from other vehicles.

On September 13, 2021, a Chevrolet Bolt caught fire in a private garage in Cherokee County, Georgia, US. The owner had either been unaware or simply ignored the recommendation to park outside.

== Chevrolet Volt ==
As a result of a crash-tested Chevrolet Volt that caught fire in June 2011 three weeks after the testing, the National Highway Traffic Safety Administration (NHTSA) issued a statement saying that the agency does not believe the Volt or other electric vehicles are at a greater risk of fire than gasoline-powered vehicles. They added: "In fact, all vehicles –both electric and gasoline-powered – have some risk of fire in the event of a serious crash." The NHTSA announced in November 2011 that it was working with all automakers to develop post-crash procedures to keep occupants of electric vehicles and emergency personnel who respond to crash scenes safe.

In further testing of the Volt's batteries carried out by NHTSA in November 2011, two of the three tests resulted in thermal events, including fire. Therefore, the NHTSA opened a formal safety defect investigation on November 25, 2011, to examine the potential risks involved from intrusion damage to the battery in the Chevrolet Volt.

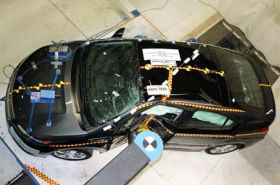
Chevrolet Volt after being subjected to the NCAP pole test on May 12, 2011, at the MGA test facility.

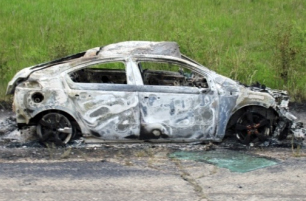
Pole tested Chevrolet Volt after the fire at MGA reported on June 6, 2011.

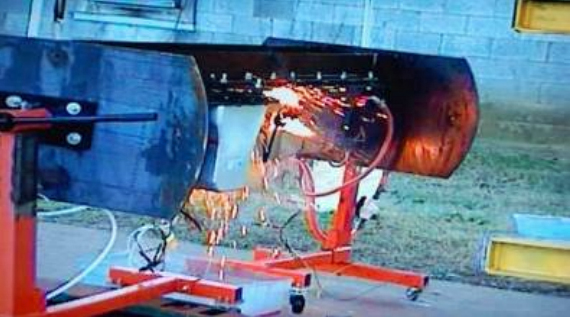
Arcing event during manual rollover of post crashed Volt's battery, November 24, 2011.

On January 5, 2012, General Motors announced that it would offer a customer satisfaction program to provide modifications to the Chevrolet Volt to reduce the chance that the battery pack could catch fire days or weeks after a severe accident. General Motors explained the modifications will enhance the vehicle structure that surround the battery and the battery coolant system to improve battery protection after a severe crash. The safety enhancements consist of strengthening an existing portion of the Volt's vehicle safety structure to further protect the battery pack in a severe side collision; add a sensor in the reservoir of the battery coolant system to monitor coolant levels; and add a tamper-resistant bracket to the top of the battery coolant reservoir to help prevent potential coolant overfill. On January 20, 2012, the NHTSA closed the Volt's safety defect investigation related to post-crash fire risk. The agency concluded that "no discernible defect trend exists" and also found that the modifications recently developed by General Motors are sufficient to reduce the potential for battery intrusion resulting from side impacts. The NHTSA also said that "based on the available data, NHTSA does not believe that Chevy Volts or other electric vehicles pose a greater risk of fire than gasoline-powered vehicles." The agency also announced it has developed interim guidance to increase awareness and identify appropriate safety measures regarding electric vehicles for the emergency response community, law enforcement officers, tow truck operators, storage facilities and consumers.

== Fisker Karma ==
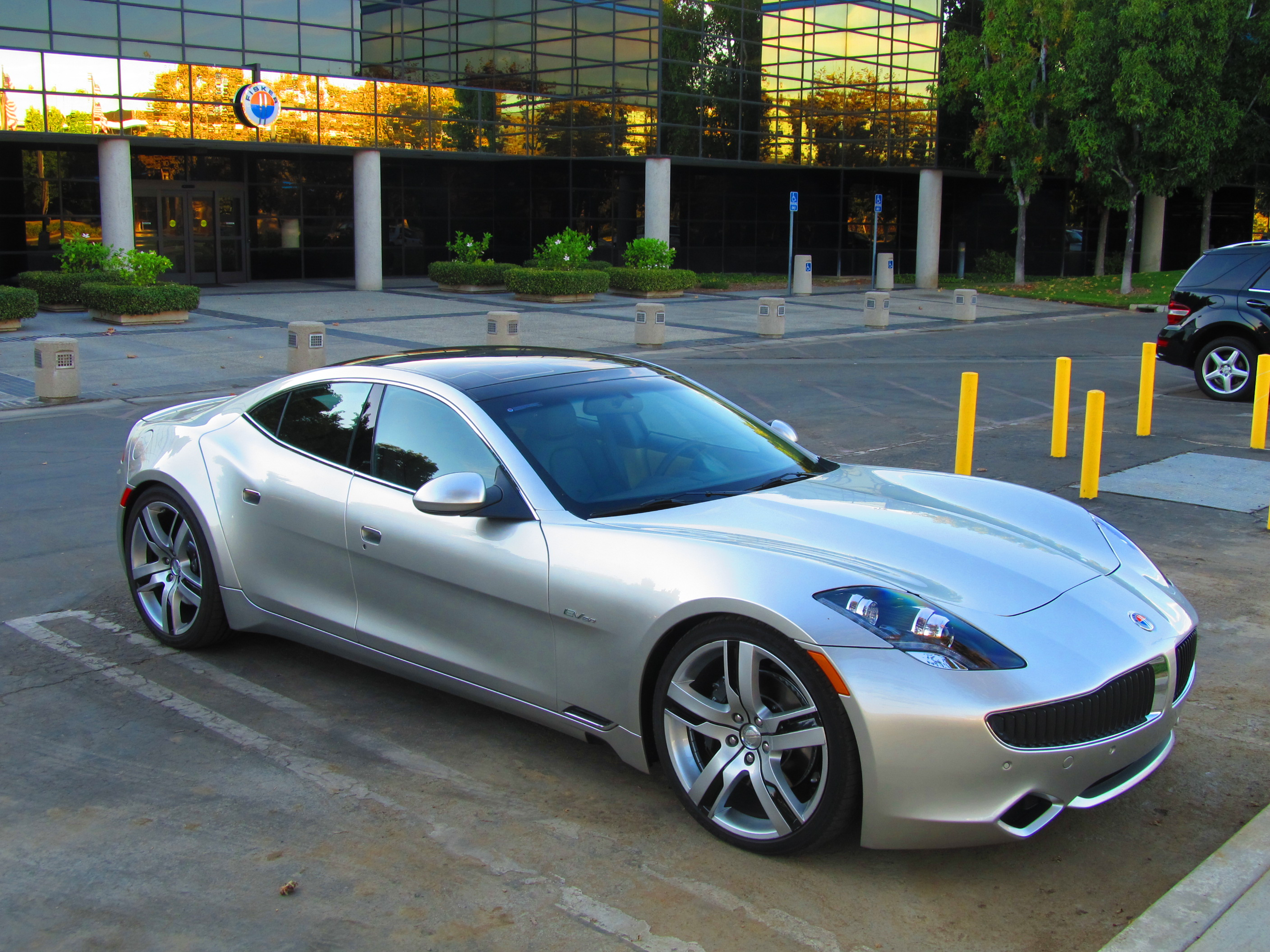
Fisker Karma plug-in hybrid.

In December 2011, Fisker Automotive recalled the first 239 Karmas delivered to the U.S. due to a risk of battery fire caused by coolant leak. Of the 239 cars, less than fifty had been delivered to customers, the rest were in dealerships. In the report filed by Fisker Automotive with the NHTSA, the carmaker said some hose clamps were not properly positioned, which could allow a coolant leak and an electrical short could possibly occur if coolant enters the battery compartment, causing a thermal event within the battery, including a possible fire. In May 2012 a Fisker Karma was involved in a home fire that also burnt two other cars in Fort Bend County, Texas. The chief fire investigator said the Karma was the origin of the fire that spread to the house, but the exact cause is still unknown. The plug-in hybrid electric car was not plugged in at the time the fire started and it was reported that the Karma's battery was intact. The carmaker release a public statement saying that "...there are conflicting reports and uncertainty surrounding this particular incident. The cause of the fire is not yet known and is being investigated." Fisker Automotive also stated that the battery pack "does not appear to have been a contributing factor in this incident." The NHTSA is conducting a field inquiry of the incident, and is working with insurance adjusters and Fisker to determine the fire's cause.

A second fire incident took place in August 2012 when a Karma caught fire while stopped at a parking lot in Woodside, California. According to Fisker engineers, the area of origin for the fire was determined to be outside the engine compartment, as the fire was located at the driver's side front corner of the car. The evidence suggested that the ignition source was not the lithium-ion battery pack, new technology components or unique exhaust routing. The investigation conducted by Fisker engineers and an independent fire expert concluded that the cause of the fire was a low temperature cooling fan located at the left front of the Karma, forward of the wheel. An internal fault caused the fan to fail, overheat and started a slow-burning fire. Fisker announced a voluntary recall on all Karmas sold to replace the faulty fan and install an additional fuse.

== BYD e6 ==
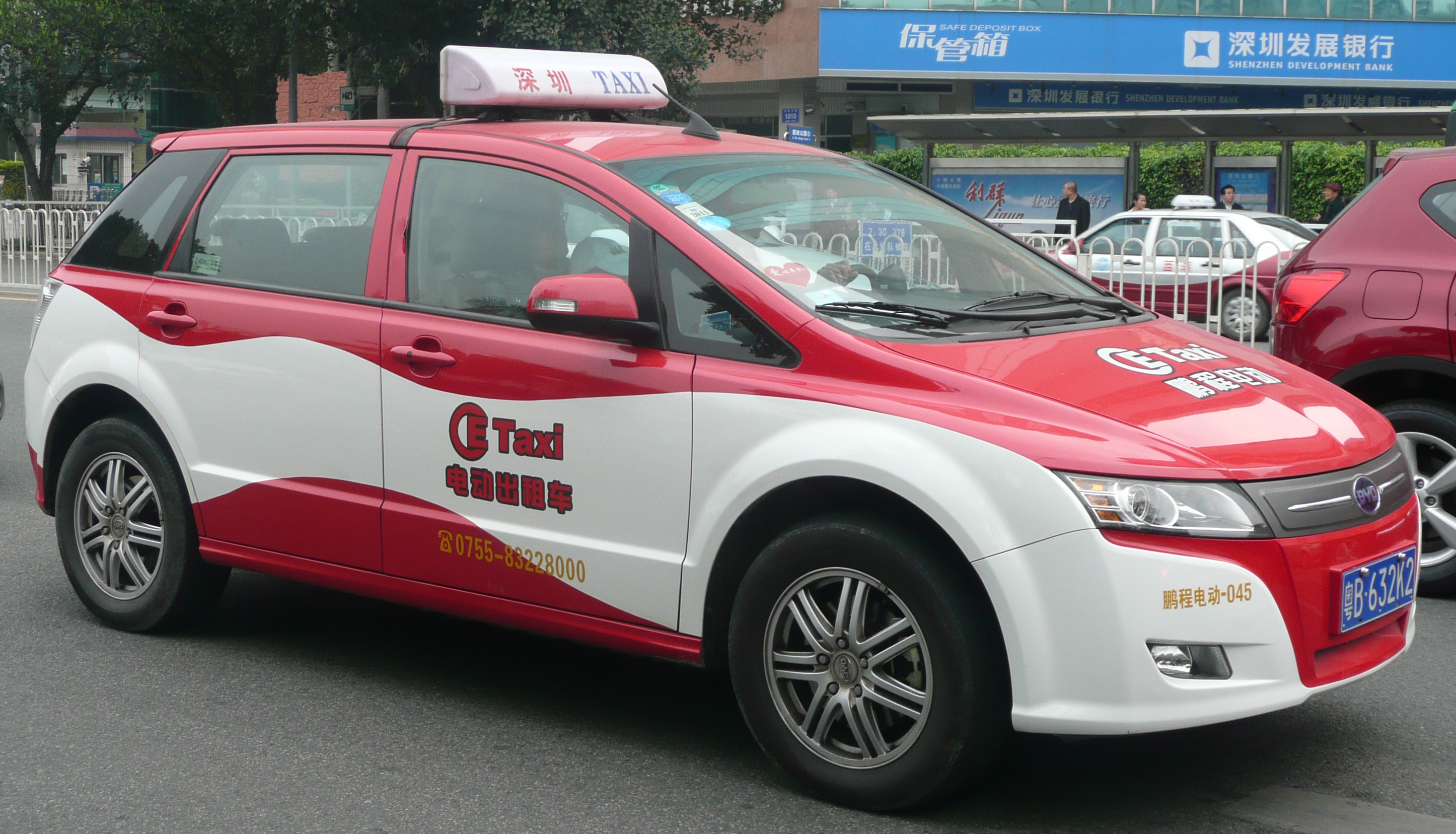
BYD e6 all-electric taxi in Shenzhen, China.

In May 2012, after a Nissan GT-R crashed into a BYD e6 taxi in Shenzhen, China, the electric car caught fire after hitting a tree killing all three occupants. The Chinese investigative team concluded that the cause of the fire was that "electric arcs caused by the short-circuiting of high voltage lines of the high voltage distribution box ignited combustible material in the vehicle including the interior materials and part of the power batteries." The team also noted that the battery pack did not explode; 75% of the single cell batteries did not catch fire; and no flaws in the safety design of the vehicle were identified.

On December 29, 2020, a BYD e6 taxi caught fire at an intersection in Luohu District, Shenzhen, China.

== BYD Han EV ==
In July 2021, Dongchedi (Chinese: 懂车帝), a ByteDance's automotive media in China, performed a crash test of BYD Han EV versus Arcfox Alpha-S. Having been parked for 48 hours after the test, only the Han EV caught fire and burned to the ground.

On June 15, 2022, a BYD Han EV caught fire on a road in Xaysetha district, Vientiane, Laos.

== BYD Tang ==
On November 15, 2021, a BYD Tang EV caught fire in a workshop in Kristiansand, Norway.

On January 26, 2022, a BYD Tang DM-i (plug-in hybrid) caught fire on a flatbed tow truck, on a road in mainland China. By the such kind of transporting, it seems to be a malfunctioning car.

== BYD Qin ==
On May 28, 2020, a BYD Qin Pro EV caught fire at a charging station in Shenzhen, China.

On October 28, 2020, a BYD Qin Pro EV caught fire after charging completed in Yantai, Shandong province, China.

On November 22, 2021, a BYD Qin Pro EV caught fire in an underground parking lot in Beijing, China.

On February 13, 2022, a BYD Qin Plus DM-i (plug-in hybrid) caught fire on a road in Zhongshan city, Guangdong province, China.

== BYD Atto 3 ==
On September 3, 2023, a BYD Atto 3 suffered smoke and heat damage to the engine compartment when charging at a charging station in Mueang Udon Thani district, Udon Thani, Thailand. Investigation showed that the damage was caused by a wire attached to the 12 V lead–acid battery, not the vehicle's main EV battery pack.

In the morning of October 1, 2025, a car transporter truck and nine of brand new BYD Atto 3 cars on it caught fire on the M5 motorway in Devon, South West England, resulting in the temporary closure of the motorway between junctions 28 and junction 29.

== BYD Seal ==
In the early morning of April 19, 2025, a BYD Seal caught fire in Bang Khun Si subdistrict, Bangkok Noi District, Bangkok. From the initial inspection, there was severe burn damage in the front part, such as the front hood, headlights and front bumper.

== Dodge Ram 1500 Plug-in Hybrid ==
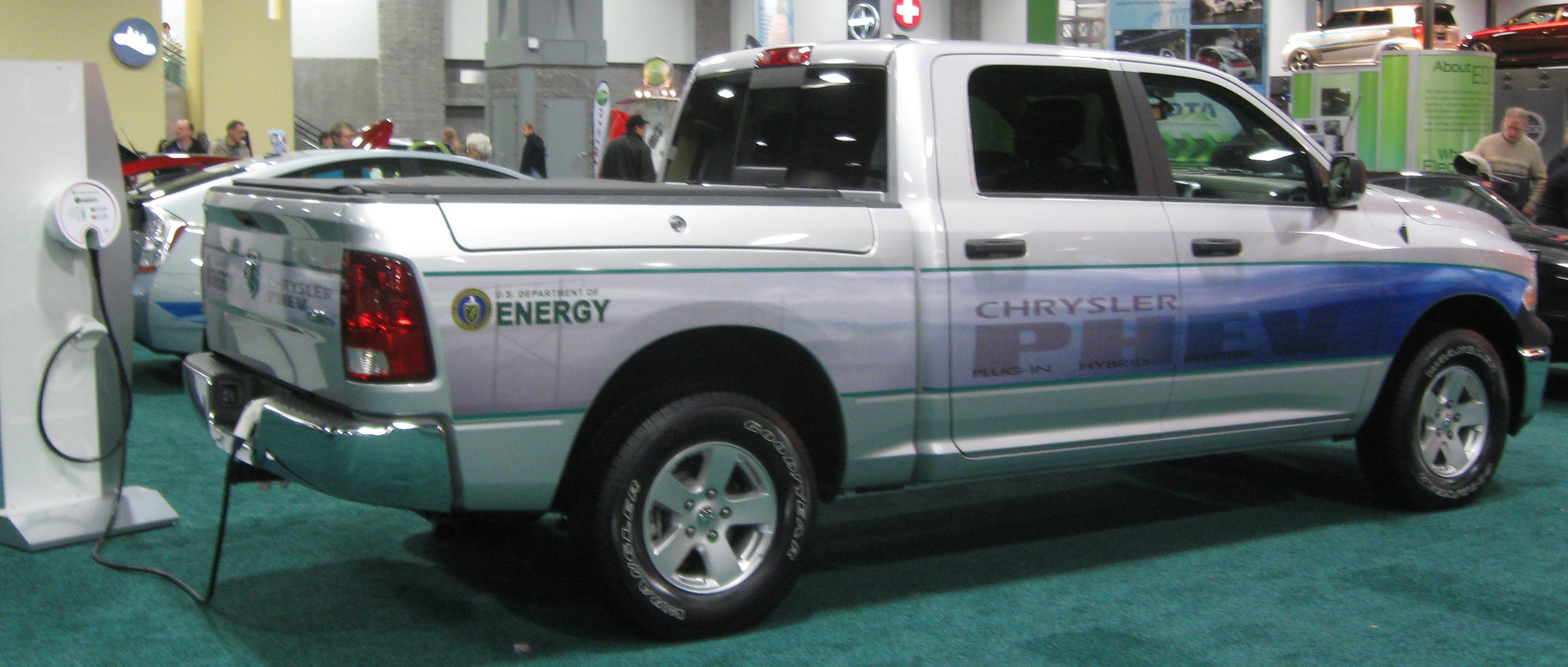
Dodge Ram 1500 Plug-in Hybrid demonstrator

In September 2012, Chrysler temporarily suspended a demonstration program that it was conducting with 109 Dodge Ram 1500 Plug-in Hybrids and 23 Chrysler Town & Country plug-in hybrids. All units deployed in the program were recalled due to damage sustained by three separate pickup trucks when their 12.9 kWh battery packs overheated. The carmaker plans to upgrade the battery packs with cells that use a different lithium-ion chemistry before the vehicles go back on service. Chrysler explained that no one was injured from any of the incidents, and the vehicles were not occupied at the time, nor any of the minivans were involved in any incident, but they were withdrawn as a precaution. The carmaker reported that the demonstration fleet had collectively accumulated 1.3 million miles (2.1 million km) before the vehicles were recalled. The demonstration is a program jointly funded by Chrysler and the U.S. Department of Energy that includes the first-ever factory-produced vehicles capable of reverse power flow. The experimental system would allow fleet operators to use their plug-in hybrids to supply electricity for a building during a power outage, reduce power usage when electric rates are high or even sell electricity back to their utility company.

== Fires related to Hurricane Sandy flood ==
In separate incidents during the storm and flooding caused by Hurricane Sandy on the night of October 29, 2012, one Toyota Prius Plug-in Hybrid and 16 Fisker Karmas caught fire while being parked at Port Newark-Elizabeth Marine Terminal. The vehicles were partially submerged by flash floods caused by the hurricane. In the case of the Toyota's incident, a Prius PHV burned and two other Priuses, a conventional hybrid and a plug-in, just smoldered. A Toyota spokeswoman said the fire "likely started because saltwater got into the electrical system." She also clarified that the incident affected only three cars out of the 4,000 Toyotas that were at the terminal during the storm, including more than 2,128 plug-in or hybrid models. Fisker Automotive spokesman said that the Karmas were not charging at the time of the fire and there were no injuries. After an investigation by Fisker engineers, witnessed by NHTSA representatives, the company said that the origin of the fire was "residual salt damage inside a Vehicle Control Unit submerged in seawater for several hours. Corrosion from the salt caused a short circuit in the unit, which led to a fire when the Karma's 12-Volt battery fed power into the circuit." The company explained that Sandy's heavy winds spread that fire to other Karmas parked nearby, and also ruled out the vehicles' lithium-ion battery packs as a cause of, or a contributing factor to, the fire.

== Mitsubishi i-MiEV and Outlander P-HEV ==
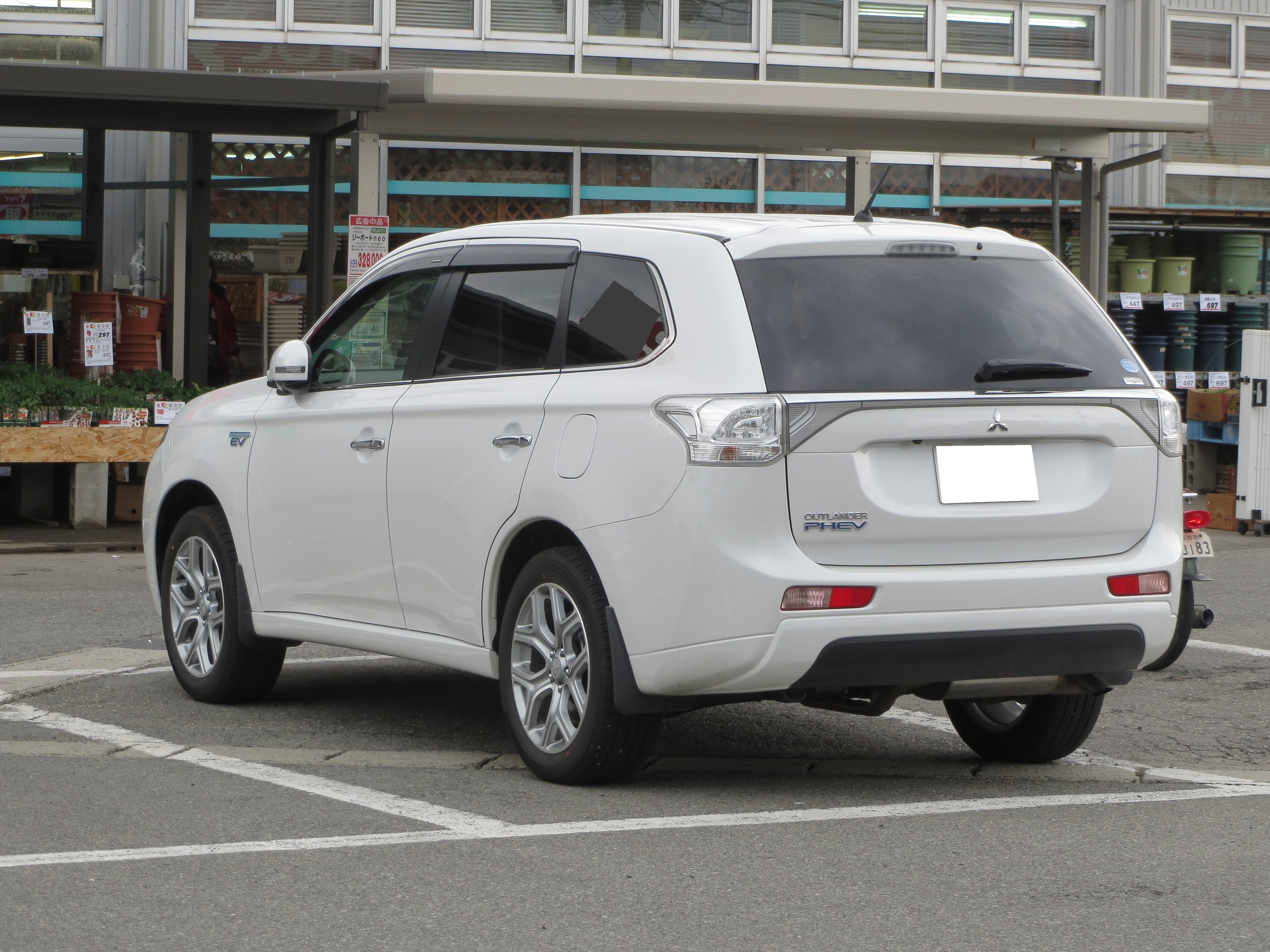
Mitsubishi Outlander P-HEV

In March 2013, Mitsubishi Motors reported two separate incidents with lithium-ion batteries used in its plug-in electric cars, one with a Mitsubishi i-MiEV electric car and the other with an Outlander P-HEV plug-in hybrid. The battery packs are produced by GS Yuasa, the same company that supplies the batteries for the Boeing 787 Dreamliner, whose entire fleet was grounded in January 2013 for battery problems. The lithium-ion battery of an i-MiEV caught fire at the Mizushima battery pack assembly plant on March 18 while connected to a charge-discharge test equipment. Three days later, the battery pack of an Outlander P-HEV at a dealership in Yokohama overheated and melted some of the battery cells, after the vehicle had been fully charged and stood for one day. Nobody was injured in either incident.

Mitsubishi did not issue a recall but halted production and sales of the two models until it determines the causes of the battery problems. The carmaker advised owners of the Outlander plug-in hybrid to drive only on gasoline mode for the time being. In the case of the i-MiEV, the problem is related with a change in GS Yuasa manufacturing process, and Mitsubishi called fleet-vehicle operators with i-MiEVs whose batteries were made under the same process as those that overheated and is working on a possible fix. In August 2013, and after changing a production process to avoid damaging any batteries, Mitsubishi restarted production of the Outlander plug-in hybrid.

In May 2019, an Outlander caught fire after immersion in salt water. The vehicle was being used to haul a boat trailer out of the water at a Port Moody boat ramp when the driver lost control. After a tow truck recovered the Outlander, what appears to be the battery pack caught fire.

== Tesla Model S, 3, X, and Y ==
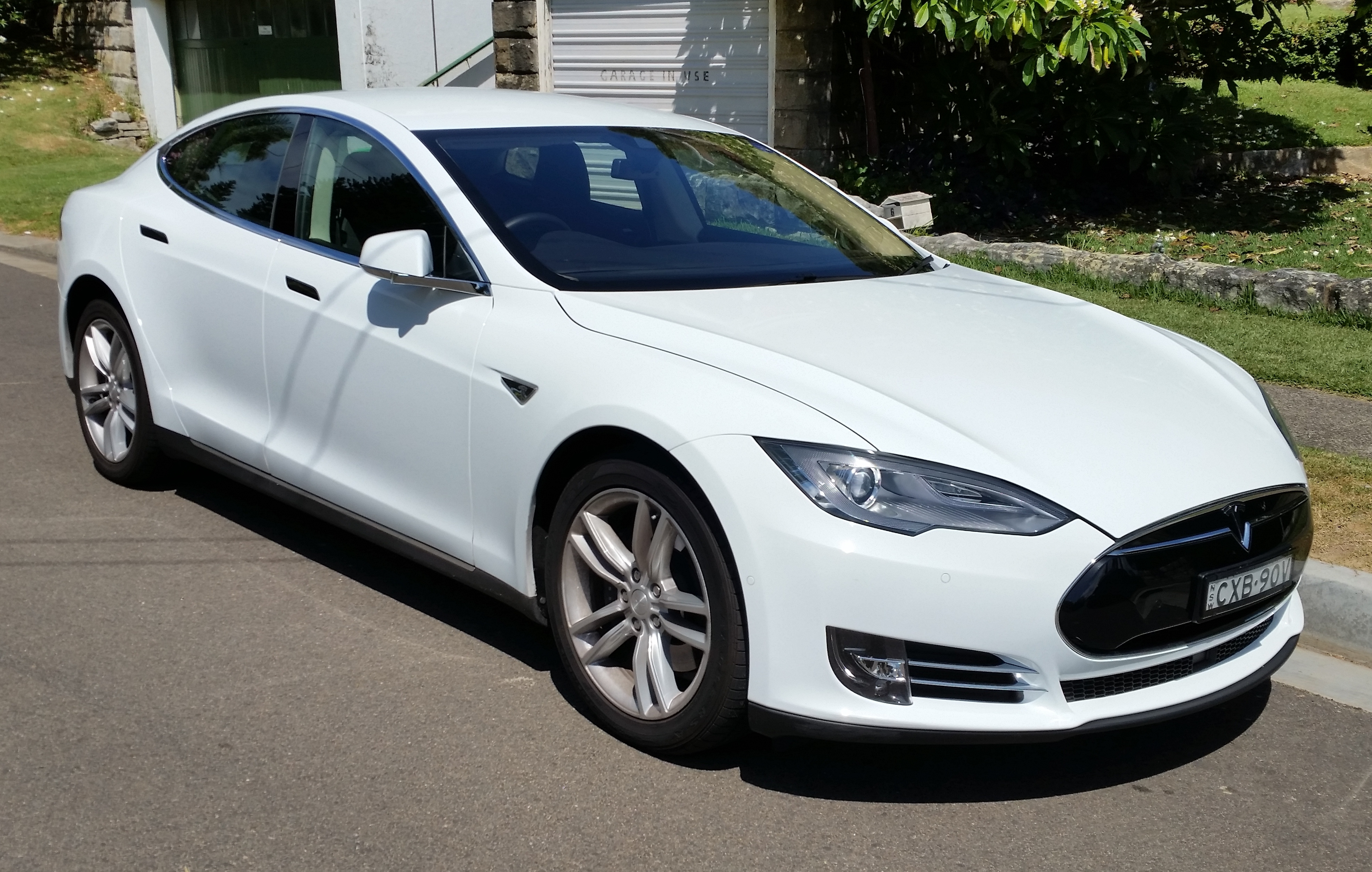
Tesla Model S

The following list of Tesla car fires is not comprehensive.

A Tesla Model S being driven on Interstate 24 near Murfreesboro, Tennessee caught fire on November 6, 2013, after it struck a tow hitch on the roadway, causing damage beneath the vehicle. Subsequently, the company announced its decision to extend its current vehicle warranty to cover fire damage and to apply a software update on Model S cars to increase the ground clearance of the Model S when driving at highway speed.

On November 15, 2013, a fire broke out in an Irvine, California garage where a Tesla Model S was plugged in and charging. The fire appears to have originated at the wall connection where the Tesla charging equipment was plugged in. Shortly afterwards, Tesla updated the Model S firmware to reduce charging current when power fluctuations were detected and replaced wall adapters with a new unit containing a thermal fuse.

On November 18, 2013, Tesla released a software update to the air suspension system to increase the ground clearance at highway speeds, and agreed to cooperate with the NHTSA on a formal investigation of recent incidents involving Tesla S vehicles.

Another fire incident took place in Toronto, Canada, in early February 2014. The Model S was parked in a garage, and it was not plugged in or charging when the fire started. As of February 14, 2014, the origin of the fire was still unknown. Tesla's response was that "[i]n this particular case, we don't yet know the precise cause, but have definitively determined that it did not originate in the battery, the charging system, the adapter or the electrical receptacle, as these components were untouched by the fire."

On March 28, 2014, the NHTSA announced that it had closed the investigation into whether the Model S design was making the electric car prone to catch fire, after the automaker said it would provide more protection to its lithium-ion batteries. According to the NHTSA, the titanium underbody shield and aluminum deflector plates, along with increased ground clearance, reduce the severity, frequency, and fire risk of underbody strikes. All Model S cars manufactured after March 6 have the 0.25-inch (6.4 mm) aluminum shield over the battery pack replaced with a new three-layer shield designed to protect the battery and charging circuitry from being punctured even in very high speed impacts. The new shielding features a hollow aluminum tube to deflect impacting objects, a titanium shield to protect sensitive components from puncture damage, and an aluminum extrusion to absorb impact energy. The new shields, which decrease vehicle range by 0.1%, will be installed free-of-charge in existing Model S vehicles by request or during the next scheduled maintenance. According to the NHTSA, the titanium underbody shield and aluminum deflector plates, along with increased ground clearance, "should reduce both the frequency of underbody strikes and the resultant fire risk."

In response to an incident in July 2014, the NHTSA contracted with Dynamic Science, Inc to investigate a "fire in a 2013 Tesla Model S that resulted from a multi-event crash." Among the findings of the investigation was that the firefighters

... went through at least four cycles of extinction using copious amounts of water. Each time after it appeared the fire was extinguished it restarted. The fire department contacted Tesla who provided information about the first responder cut loop which shuts down the high voltage system and disables the SRS and air bag components. The fire department could not access the cut loop. Tesla technicians were dispatched and indicated which wire could be safely cut...

A fire occurred in a Tesla Model S charging at a Tesla Supercharger in Norway on January 1, 2016. The fire was slow, and the owner had time to unplug the car and retrieve possessions. An investigation by the Norwegian Accident Investigation Board (AIBN) indicated that the fire originated in the car, but was otherwise inconclusive. In March 2016, Tesla stated that their own investigation into the incident concluded that the fire was caused by a short circuit in the vehicle's distribution box, but that the amount of damage prevented them from determining the exact cause. Tesla stated that the Supercharger detected the short circuit and deactivated, and a future Model S software update would stop the vehicle from charging if a short circuit is detected.

On August 15, 2016, a new Tesla Model S 90D spontaneously caught fire during a promotional test drive in Biarritz, France. Following a sudden, loud noise the dashboard presented the driver with a warning of a "charging" problem. Following advice from a passenger Tesla employee, the driver pulled over and all three occupants safely exited the vehicle. Moments later the vehicle started burning and although firefighters quickly arrived, the fire completely destroyed the vehicle within 5 minutes. Tesla subsequently determined that the vehicle in question had a "bolted electrical connection" which would normally have been tightened by a robot, but which in this case had been "improperly tightened" by a human, causing the fire.

On May 8, 2018, an 18-year-old lost control of his Tesla Model S while driving 116 mph in a 30 mph zone and hit the curb, a wall, the curb and a light pole causing the battery pack to ignite; the car was reportedly modified to be limited to a top speed of 85 mph. The driver and passenger died in the crash and subsequent fire. The battery pack reignited twice, requiring fire fighters to extinguish the burning battery pack three times. In reaction to this accident, Tesla sent an over-the-air firmware update that allows limiting the top speed to between 50 and 90 mph dedicated to the deceased driver.

On June 16, 2018, pedestrians on a Los Angeles street alerted a driver of a Tesla Model S that smoke was emanating from his vehicle. The driver pulled over and safely exited the vehicle and flames started shooting out from under it. Firefighters quickly extinguished the fire, which left the cabin unaffected. The National Transportation Safety Board subsequently stated that they would monitor Tesla's investigation of the fire to learn more about fires in battery-powered vehicles, while the NHTSA stated that it collects information regarding the incident and would take action as warranted.

On February 8, 2019, A Tesla Model S caught on fire in a private garage in Pittsburgh. Two months later, on April 8, it caught on fire again, while it was under investigation. On February 24, 2019, a Tesla Model S that crashed into a tree burst into flames and burned its driver beyond recognition Sunday evening along Flamingo Road in Davie, Florida, then repeatedly caught fire after being brought to the tow yard used by police. Also on February 24, 2019, a Tesla Model X was consumed by fire in the middle of frozen Lake Champlain. More than two years later, the investigation concluded that the car had been set on fire and the owner was charged with federal fraud. On April 21, 2019, a Tesla Model S was exploded in an underground garage in Shanghai, China. Five cars were damaged by the fire.

On May 4, 2019, a Tesla Model S, not plugged in, with smoke observed near the rear right tire. Then, on May 13, 2019, a Tesla Model S, caught on fire while parked in Hong Kong. On June 1, 2019, a Tesla Model S burned down while supercharging in Belgium. On August 10, 2019, a Tesla Model 3 collided with a truck on a high-speed road in Moscow, Russia, and subsequently burned down. On November 12, 2019, a Tesla Model X from 2017 burst into flames while charging, leaving the vehicle completely destroyed in Chester, England.

On January 19, 2021, a Tesla Model 3 exploded in an underground residential parking garage in Shanghai on Tuesday, Chinese media reported. In July 2021, one of the first 250 issued Model S Plaids spontaneously burst into fire as its owner was driving it. In September 2021 alone, there were five fire related incidents involving Tesla's. On February 22, 2022, State Farm sued Tesla after another home was destroyed by fire.

== Nissan Leaf ==
On September 1, 2015, a Nissan Leaf caught fire and was destroyed on a road in Flower Mound, Texas without causing injuries. The cause of the fire was not confirmed.

On October 16, 2020, a Nissan Leaf and a residential house burned down in the village of Sychavka in Odesa Raion, Odesa Oblast, Ukraine. It is unclear whether the fire started in the house or in the car. A resident of the house died in the fire.

On July 8, 2021, a Nissan Leaf caught fire in Khmelnytskyi, Ukraine, while charging at a public charging station outside a shopping centre.

On August 28, 2021, a Nissan Leaf caught fire while parked outside in Saga, Japan. According to the owner, the car had been left outside after heavy rainfall in the area and suddenly caught fire two weeks later.

On September 14, 2021, a Nissan Leaf caught fire in Komsomolsk-on-Amur, Russia, probably while charging via an extension cord.

On September 28, 2025, a Nissan Leaf caught fire in Littleton, Colorado, US, while charging at a public charging station outside a King Soopers grocery store.

== VW ID.3 ==
On August 14, 2021, a VW ID.3 caught fire in Groningen, Netherlands. The driver had just put her child in the car when the car began to smoke. She managed to save her child and stepped away from the vehicle. According to witnesses, at least five loud blasts were heard, after each of which the fire seemed to intensify.

On August 23, 2021, a VW ID.3 caught fire while travelling in Kellmünz, Germany. According to the driver, the car displayed several error messages, and suddenly he noticed smoke. The car was submerged in water by the firefighters.

On September 14, 2021, a VW ID.3 caught fire while travelling near the Lunner Tunnel in Lunner municipality, Norway. The driver, who noticed the smoke while driving, was not injured.

On October 27, 2021, a VW ID.3 caught fire in a parking lot in Brühl, Germany.

== VW ID.4 ==
On November 21, 2021, a VW ID.4 caught fire while charging in a parking garage in Ravensburg, Germany.

== VW e-Golf ==
On December 7, 2017, a VW e-Golf caught fire in Triangel, Germany. Responding for the first time to a high-voltage battery electric vehicle fire, the firefighters first cooled the vehicle then moved it into a container which they then filled with water.

On September 3, 2021, a VW e-Golf caught fire in Dumbrăvița, Romania. The firefighters used a container to submerge the car in water.

== VW ID. Buzz ==
In June 2023, a Volkswagen ID. Buzz reportedly exploded and then caught fire a few days later whilst it was charging in Finland. However, witnesses state that it may have actually been caused by an electrical fault inside the charging unit rather than the vehicle itself.

== Porsche Panamera E-Hybrid ==
On March 16, 2018, a Panamera E-Hybrid that was plugged into a household outlet for charging in Thailand burst into flames.

== Porsche Taycan ==
On February 16, 2020, a Porsche Taycan burned while parked in a residential garage in Florida, after which Porsche started investigating the incident.

On April 2, 2021, a Porsche Taycan caught fire while charging in Skjeberg, Norway.

On October 12, 2021, a new Porsche Taycan Cross Turismo caught fire in Red Hill, Victoria, Australia. The vehicle had just been driven into a local estate, when smoke began coming out from under the bonnet. As the fire shut down the 12-volt electrical system, the firefighters were unable to open the bonnet to get at the lithium battery. Reputedly, the Porsche Taycan Cross Turismo was the only car of its kind in Australia.

On May 24, 2024, a Porsche Taycan caught fire while parked on Hua Mak, Bang Kapi district, Bangkok, Thailand.

On August 16, 2025, a Porsche Taycan caught fire while parked at a repair shop in Saphan Sung subdistrict, Saphan Sung district, Bangkok, Thailand.

At about 5:00 PM on March 26, 2026, a Porsche Taycan caught fire while parked in Soi Phaholyothin 30, Chan Kasem, Chatuchak District, Bangkok, Thailand.

== Hyundai Ioniq ==
On June 11, 2021, a fully electric Hyundai Ioniq caught fire in Sehnde-Müllingen, Germany.

On November 13, 2021, a fully electric Hyundai Ioniq caught fire in Haßfurt, Germany. According to local police, the fire was caused either by a technical issue or arson.

== Hyundai Ioniq 5 ==
On January 7, 2026, a fully electric Hyundai Ioniq 5 N caught fire at car repair in Medan, Sumatera Utara, Indonesia.

== Hyundai Kona Electric ==
On July 26, 2019, a Kona Electric was parked in a residential garage in Montreal, Canada. The owner reported that the car was not plugged in at the time. An unprovoked fire began, and this triggered an explosion that projected the garage door across the street and caused damage to the attached structure. There were no injuries.

Another Kona Electric caught fire while charging in Gangneung, Gangwon Province, South Korea on July 28, 2019.

A fire in a Kona Electric occurred in Bucheon, Gyeonggi Province, South Korea on August 9, 2019. The flames began at the floor of the rear seat of the vehicle, which was parked at the time.

On August 13, 2019, a Kona Electric caught fire while being charged in an underground parking level at an apartment in Sejong City, South Korea. The vehicle was completely destroyed.

On September 17, 2019, in Leonstein, Austria a battery fire reportedly occurred while driving.

On April 2, 2020, a Kona EV fire occurred in Gyeonggi Ansan South Korea while parked after a full charge.

On May 29, 2020, a Kona EV which after full charge at the electric charging station in Sangyeok-dong, Buk-gu, Daegu, Korea caught on fire. The fire went out in two hours, but the vehicle was completely burned, causing 29 million won of property damage.

On August 7, 2020, another Kona EV fire occurred in Buk-gu, Daegu City South Korea while charging.

On August 24, 2020, Kona EV fire occurred in Jeongeup, Jeonbuk South Korea while parked after a full charge.

Kona EV caught fire on Jeju Island, South Korea on Sept. 26, 2020. The vehicle was parked, connected to an EV charger inside the parking lot of an apartment building.

On October 4, 2020, a Hyundai Kona electric vehicle (EV) burst into flames in the early hours of Sunday morning while parked in the underground parking lot of an apartment in Daegu, South Korea.

The 14th Kona electric vehicle fire accident occurred at 3:41 am on October 17, 2020, at the electric vehicle rapid charging site at the Wabu-eup Community Service Center, Namyang-si, Gyeonggi-do, South Korea.

On October 18, 2020, Hyundai Motor, citing an investigation by Korea's transport ministry acknowledged a battery issue that led to a worldwide recall of 77,000 Kona EVs.

On January 23, 2021, The fire mysteriously broke out at a Kona Electric being charged at a taxi company in Yucheon-dong, Dalseo-gu, Daegu at 4:11 p.m. on Jan. 23. The battery underneath the vehicle was identified as the ignition point.

A fire broke out in a Kona EV parked in a pension near a beach in Boryeong, Chungcheongnam-do South Korea on the 18th of June 2021.

Emergency services in Oslo, Norway were called out to Båhusveien on Sinsen on June 16, 2021, to extinguish a Kona EV fire.

On July 1, 2021, a Hyundai Kona Electric caught fire in an underground parking lot in Saesam Village 3, Boram-dong, Sejong-si, South Korea.

On July 4, 2021, another Hyundai Kona Electric caught fire in Oslo, Norway.

On July 12, 2021, a Hyundai Kona Electric caught fire in an accident in Alver Municipality, Norway.

On July 30, 2021, a Hyundai Kona Electric caught fire in Rhaudermoor, Germany.

On August 31, 2022, A Kona caught fire while it was parked in an underground parking lot in Quebec City, Canada.

== Audi E-Tron ==
On January 20, 2021, an Audi E-Tron Sportback caught fire near a car dealership in Munich, Germany, causing nearby windows to burst.

== Audi E-Tron GT ==
On 30 July 2021, an Audi E-Tron GT caught fire while charging at a public charging station in Munich, Germany. Both the car and the charging station was destroyed in the fire.

== BMW i3 ==
On November 11, 2020, a BMW i3 caught fire in Vorendaal, Netherlands, while connected to a charging station.

On April 22, 2021, the mayor's BMW i3 caught fire in Alpen, Germany.

On April 27, 2021, a BMW i3 caught fire in a private garage in Schorndorf, Germany.

On May 3, 2021, a BMW i3-REx caught fire while travelling between Picton and Nelson in New Zealand. The fire was preceded by a warning on the car's dashboard "can't continue journey, please contact dealership immediately". After pulling over at the first safe location, flames were seen licking from under the rear wheel arch. The occupants were able to exit the vehicle without harm, and remove most of their luggage before the fire intensified. The vehicle was completely destroyed. The cause of the fire is unknown.

On July 6, 2021, a BMW i3 suddenly caught fire while travelling in Warsaw, Poland. The driver managed to escape the vehicle.

On August 30, 2021, an electric BMW prototype caught fire while parked within the BMW premises in Eching, Germany. Once extinguished by the firefighters, the car reignited and had to be submerged in water. The exact cause is unknown.

On October 7, 2021, a BMW i3 caught fire in a parking lot in Chester, United Kingdom.

On October 20, 2022, a BMW i3 caught fire in Northwest Cloverdale.

== BMW i8 ==
On March 25, 2019. According to the fire department in Tilburg, the Netherlands, the BMW i8 began to smoke while in the car dealership. The staff called the fire service. The BMW i8 was put in a water tank, which may also contain other substances, in order to prevent the vehicle battery from exploding. (Tilburg, the Netherlands)

== Renault Zoe ==
On October 4, 2020, a Renault Zoe caught fire in Karmøy Municipality, Norway. Local residents were evacuated from a nearby building as a precaution.

On December 15, 2020, a Renault Zoe caught fire while parked in the Bjørndal suburb of Oslo, Norway.

On December 30, 2020, a 2017 Renault Zoe caught fire in a parking garage in Sandvika, Norway.

On January 3, 2021, a Renault Zoe caught fire while connected to a charging station in Illingen-Hüttigweiler, Germany. Parked next to the Zoe was another electric car, a Škoda Citigo e-iV, that also caught fire.

On January 25, 2021, a Renault Zoe caught fire while travelling in Quimperlé, France. The driver and his daughter managed to exit the car without any injuries.

On January 29, 2021, a Renault Zoe caught fire while charging at a public charging station in Teterow, Germany. The police suspected the cause to be arson.

On February 16, 2021, a Renault Zoe caught fire while parked (and possibly charging) in Bamberg, Germany.

On February 17, 2021, a Renault Zoe caught fire in the Amberg Tunnel near Feldkirch, Austria. The driver managed to exit the tunnel through the north entrance and stopped on the shoulder, where the firefighters subsequently extinguished the fire.

On May 31, 2021, a Renault Zoe caught fire in a private parking lot in Mulhouse, France.

On June 13, 2021, a Renault Zoe suddenly burst into flames while on the road near Villeneuve-lès-Béziers, France, injuring both occupants, one of whom suffered severe burns.

On July 20, 2021, a Renault Zoe caught fire while charging at a public charging station in Stadskanaal, Netherlands.

On August 14, 2021, a Renault Zoe caught fire in Stolberg, Germany.

On November 11, 2021, a Renault Zoe caught fire in Vennesla, Norway. The driver had to rescue her baby from the burning car.

== Peugeot e-208 ==
On September 8, 2021, a Peugeot e-208 caught fire while charging in Oslo, Norway. Because of the potentially toxic smoke, local residents were asked to keep their windows shut until the fire was completely extinguished.

On the morning of December 19, 2022, a Peugeot e-208 GT caught fire while parked on a suburban street in Wellington, New Zealand. The fire engulfed the front of the vehicle, destroying everything forward of the firewall. The traction battery was not affected, however, the possibility of the 12 V battery in the front being involved has not been ruled out. A fire risk recall concerning this front battery was issued internationally in 2020. It said, that “due to an error in the manufacturing process, a short circuit may occur in the battery located under the front bonnet.”

On June 27, 2022, a Peugeot e-208 caught fire, while being charged in a home garage in Dynin, Czech Republic.

== Peugeot Partner ==
On October 21, 2021, two fully electric Peugeot Partners caught fire in Trondheim, Norway.

On November 15, 2021, a fully electric Peugeot Partner caught fire in Sortland, Norway. According to the occupants, they noticed the flames while looking for a parking spot and then quickly exited the van.

== Jaguar I-Pace ==
On September 11, 2020, a Jaguar I-Pace crashed into a tree and caught fire in Oslo, Norway.

On August 23, 2021, a Jaguar I-Pace caught fire while parked near Redmond, Oregon, US. The battery melted and it took around two hours to put out the fire.

On October 25, 2021, a Jaguar I-Pace caught fire while charging in Székesfehérvár, Hungary. The fire reignited several times.

On May 5, 2023, a Jaguar I-Pace caught fire in underground garage in Prague, Czech Republic.

On November 19, 2023, a Jaguar I-Pace caught fire while connected to a charging station in a parking garage on Occamstraße in Munich, Germany. The fire destroyed the vehicle and damaged 29 additional cars.

== Nio ES8 ==
On April 22, 2019, an electric Nio ES8 caught fire at a Nio service center in Xi'an, Shaanxi Province, China. According to the investigation report, the short circuit of battery was caused by chassis deformation after a collision of the car.

On May 16, 2019, a Nio ES8 caught fire in Anting, Jiading District, Shanghai, China.

== BMW i4 and iX ==
In August 2022, BMW recalled the BMW i4 and BMW iX models due to a risk of catching fire due to a battery issue. In June 2022, BMW was aware of incidents of a iX xDrive50 catching fire in the United States and a iX M60 catching fire outside of the United States.

== StreetScooter ==
On July 29, 2021, a StreetScooter caught fire in a workshop in Trier, Germany, due to a fault in the battery. As a result, the workshop building was so unstable it had to be demolished.

== Okinawa electric scooter ==
On April 30, 2022, an Okinawa electric scooter catches fire in Chennai, first such incident after recall notice. While riding, owner noticed smoke coming out from e-scooter. The electric scooter got totally damaged due to the fire.

== Dacia Spring ==
On May 12, 2023, a Dacia Spring caught fire while being driven, near Timișoara, Romania. The owner stated that there were some noises in the back and 15 minutes later the car was engulfed in fire.

On July 24, 2023, a Dacia Spring Caught fire in Cluj-Napoca, Romania.

== Deepal SL03 ==
On August 18, 2024, a Deepal SL03 caught fire in mainland China when driving on a stone tiled surface, a broken stone tile hit the car hard from the under. The sharp corners of the stone tile tore the battery bottom plate, pierced two battery cells, and the battery cells caught fire.

== Rivian R1T/R1S ==
On June 5, 2023, a Rivian R1T caught fire in Mill Valley, California, US, while charging at an Electrify America public charing station.

On the night of August 24, 2024, a fire broke out in Rivian's parking lot in Normal, Illinois, damaged more than fifty R1S and R1T vehicles that were awaiting delivery to customers.

At about 1 AM of November 1, 2025, a fire broke out in the parking lot of a Rivian service center in Franklin, Tennessee, damaged four R1S and R1T vehicles and injured one firefighter. It is believed that the fire was started by one of the Rivian vehicles that was plugged into a charger at the time.

== Ora Good Cat ==
On December 17, 2024, an Ora Good Cat 500 Ultra caught fire when parking in Lat Krabang, Bangkok, Thailand. The news sparked widespread curiosity about what caused the fire. Later, there was a CCTV footage showing a suspicious man setting the car on fire, so it is clearly an arson. Great Wall Motor Thailand states that the high-voltage battery of this EV did not catch fire, even though the fire engulfed almost all other parts of this EV.

== Volvo XC60 T8 PHEV ==
On January 7, 2025, a Volvo XC60 T8 PHEV while charging in a carport of a house in Khan Na Yao district, Bangkok, Thailand, a lot of smoke appeared and then fire broke out, burned the car and the carport roof. The car owner said that he had used the car for 4 years and had it checked regularly. However, in the past 4–5 months or so, a dashboard warning light had warned that the EV battery had a problem, so he took it to a Volvo service center and found that there was a problem with one of the battery cells. It was fixed and he was able to use it normally without any further signs until the fire occurred.

== Avatr 06 ==
On October 5, 2025, an Avatr 06 caught fire in a parking lot in Ningde, Fujian, China. The fire also damaged other seven cars. The car owner stated that before the fire, the Avatr app alerted her that the cabin temperature had reached 76.4 degrees Celsius. The smoke was beginning to billow from the front passenger seat.

== Li Mega ==
On October 23, 2025, a Li Mega caught fire and completely burned down on a road in Xuhui, Shanghai, China, without collisions. Fortunately that the car doors opened automatically in this fire event, allowing everyone inside to escape for their lives.

== Geely Xingyuan ==
On October 23, 2025, a Geely Xingyuan caught fire in a parking lot in Suzhou, Jiangsu, China. Witnesses saw and heard explosions resembling fireworks, so there is still a possibility that the fire may have originated inside the car interior.

== IM LS6 ==
At about 12 AM of January 1, 2026, an MG IM6 (the name of IM LS6 in Thailand) caught fire while charging at a house in Lam Phaya subdistrict, Bang Len district, Nakhon Pathom, Thailand. The car owner stated that he had only received the new car the day before.

== Volvo EX30 ==
At about 10:30 PM of February 4, 2026, a Volvo EX30 caught fire while parking at a parking lot in Tung Tau Tsuen, Ha Tsuen, Yuen Long District, Hong Kong. The fire also damaged at least two other cars.

At 3:12 PM of March 25, 2026, a Volvo EX30 caught fire while parking in a house in Bang Phai, Bang Khae District, Bangkok, Thailand. Office of The Consumer Protection Board (OCPB) has urgently summoned the vehicle manufacturer for clarification.

At 9:09 PM of May 15, 2026, another Volvo EX30 in Thailand caught fire while parking. Before parking the electric car, the owner drove it to a charging station and charged it to 80%, which slightly exceeds the 70% recommended by Volvo, then drove back to the parking space.

== Wuling Binguo ==
At around 11:30, on May 3, 2026, a stationary Wuling Binguo caught fire in Xuancheng, Jiangsu province, China. The owner said the vehicle was not charging and had not been driven for roughly three hours before the incident. SAIC-GM-Wuling technical personnel arrived to retrieve components, but the company did not publicly acknowledge the fire.

== Zeekr 7X ==
On August 9, 2026, a Zeekr 7X caught fire at a charging station in Ningbo, China, though not charging. Zeekr's initial investigation of the incident revealed that the car was previously involved in a collision and was never reported or inspected at an official Zeekr service center.

== Electric ships ==
The Norwegian ferry MF Ytterøyningen operated by Norled was delivered in 2006 and is equipped with a Corvus Orca Energy storage system (ESS) with 1,989 kWh capacity. A small fire was reported on October 10, 2019, in the battery room. The ferry returned to harbor under its own power, where passengers and crew were evacuated to land. Overnight, however, a serious gas explosion rocked the battery room causing significant damage. Norwegian authorities have issued a statement and hazard warning.

Norwegian broadcasting company NRK reported that twelve firefighters were taken to hospital for exposure to hazardous gases associated with the batteries.

== Electric bus fires ==
On September 30, 2021, 25 busses were destroyed after a fire at a SBB bus depot in Stuttgart, Germany. It is suspected that the fire started from a Mercedes eCitaro electric bus while charging.

On April 29, 2022, RATP withdrew 149 Bolloré Bluebus 5SE busses from service, after two separate fires within a month.

== Formula E ==
In October 2023, a fire in Valencia caused the pitlane to be evacuated and the pre-season test to be delayed by a day and half.

== See also ==
- Boeing 787 Dreamliner battery problems (related to lithium-ion batteries accidents, on aircraft)
- UPS Airlines Flight 6, an airplane crash caused by the thermal runaway of its lithium-ion battery cargo
