= Green Spot =

Green Spot may refer to:

- Green Spot (soft drink), a non-carbonated soft drink sold in South East Asia
- Green Spot (whiskey), an Irish pot still whiskey
- Green Spot Co., Ltd., a Thai beverage company, best known for its Vitamilk soy drink

== See also ==
- Greenspot, California (disambiguation), for places with the name
