= Asahi Soft Drinks =

Japanese soft drink company

Asahi Soft Drinks Co., Ltd アサヒ飲料株式会社
- Type: Private company KK
- Industry: Beverages
- Founded: March 30, 1982; 44 years ago
- Headquarters: 1-23-1 Azuma-bashi, Sumida, Tokyo, Japan 130-8602
- Products: Mitsuya Cider, Wonda coffee, White Milk Tea, others
- Revenue: ¥11,081,688,000 (2006)
- Number of employees: 1400 (2006)
- Parent: Asahi Breweries
- Website: asahiinryo.co.jp

Asahi Soft Drinks Co., Ltd (アサヒ飲料株式会社, Asahi Inryō Kabushiki Kaisha) is a soft drink company founded in 1982 and headquartered in the Azuma-bashi district of Sumida, Tokyo, Japan. It is a subsidiary of Asahi Breweries.

== History ==
In 1884, Mitsuya Hiranosui (三ツ矢平野水) (later called "Mitsuya Cider") began being sold. After becoming an Imperially licensed beverage company in 1909, Mitsuya Champagne Cider began being sold. In November 1951, Asahi Bakushu (now Asahi Beer) acquired the rights to manufacture and distribute Bireley's Orange and Wilkinson Ginger Ale from General Foods and Ellis Wilkinson Ltd., respectively; both drinks are still sold in Japan despite being discontinued in their original countries. By April 1953, Mitsuya Cider was manufactured using only sugar for sweetener.

Bireley's began being sold in cans in March 1959. In March 1972, Mitsuya Vending Corporation was established, and Asahi Bakushu entered the beverage vending machine business. Mitsuya Coffee, sold in cans, was introduced in October 1981. Mitsuya Foods Corporation was established in March 1982, and the Mitsuya Vending Corporation was merged into this new company. This is considered the beginning of Asahi Soft Drinks. The canned Mitsuya Coffee product name was changed to "NOVA" in September 1986, and footballer Diego Maradona began doing commercials for the coffee.

Mitsuya Foods officially changed its corporate name to "Asahi Beer Soft Drinks" in April 1987, and in November 1988, Asahi Beer Soft Drinks Manufacturing was established. The following two years, two manufacturing plants were opened: one in Kashiwa, Chiba Prefecture in January 1989, and one in Akashi, Hyōgo Prefecture in January 1990. In February 1990, the canned coffee brand "NOVA" was changed to "J.O.", and Hank Aaron began doing commercials. In September that same year, Asahi Beer Soft Drinks consolidated its western Japan, Tōkai, and Kyūshū subsidiaries into one company called Asahi Beer Soft Drinks.

In January 1991, Asahi Beer Soft Drinks took over the drinking water business from the parent company. The company began sales of its blended tea Asahi Jūrokucha, a blend of 16 different teas, in March 1993. The Hokuriku manufacturing plant was opened in March 1994. Three subsidiaries (Asahi Beer Soft Drinks, Asahi Beer Soft Drinks Manufacturing, and Hokuriku Asahi Beer Soft Drinks Manufacturing) merged in July 1996 to form Asahi Soft Drinks in order better focus development, manufacturing and marketing efforts.

J.O. Coffee was changed to Wonda Coffee in September 1997, and Tiger Woods began appearing in commercials using the tag line, "Wonderful Wonda." Asahi Soft Drinks was listed on the Tokyo Stock Exchange in August 1999. Asahi Umacha began sales on 2001-03-12 with a commercial by Studio Ghibli, the anime studio responsible for Princess Mononoke. The Mount Fuji manufacturing plant opened in April 2001.

Tokoro George began doing commercials in October 2002 for Wonda Morning Shot, which was previously named Asahi Sen'yō (lit. Asahi Private). Shot & Shot, a low sugar variety of Wonda, was introduced in January 2005, and a caffeine-free variety of Asahi Jūrokucha was introduced in February. Commercials for Asahi Jūrokucha featured the child actors Ei Morisako and Kakeru Totani, and veteran actor, comedian and singer Ichirō Zaitsu, as well as music by Agnes Chan. A new commercial for Wonda Morning Shot featuring Yukie Nakama and a new commercial for Wonda Shot & Shot featuring Yūsuke Santamaria were both released in September 2005.

Takarazuka Revue actress Yūki Amami appeared in a February 2006 commercial for Asahi Jūrokucha. In April, the unsweetened black canned coffee Wonda 100-nen Black was introduced. In September, Daizō Harada starred as Neptune in a commercial for Wonda Shot & Shot 69, and in November, Gyugyutto Shimikomu Collagen Water was debuted.

Also in 2006, Asahi Soft Drinks published results of a study on naturally occurring vanadium in drinking water and its effect on mice with diabetes. The study was done in conjunction with Asahi Breweries, Nihon Pharmaceutical University, and Tokyo Medical University, and found that it prevented weight gain and allowed the mice to use glucose more effectively. In 2007, Asahi Soft Drinks transferred most of its vending machine operations to its sister company LB, also owned by Asahi Breweries.

== Products ==
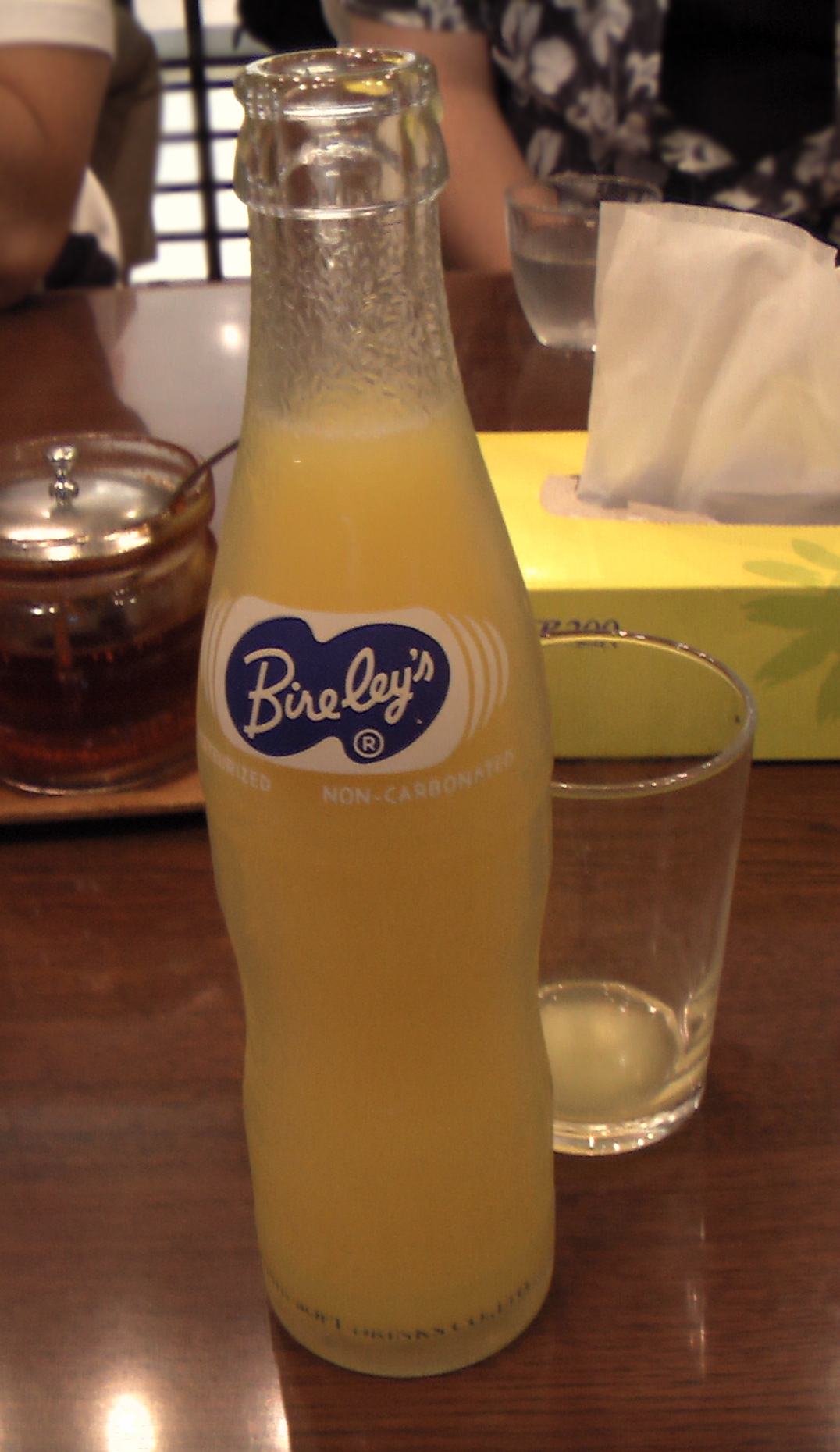
Bireley's Orange in Japan.

Asahi Soft Drinks produces a large number of drinks, including the following:

- Benifūki Ryokucha (green tea, limited release)
- Bireley's (バヤリース)
  - Bireley's Orange
  - Bireley's Apple
  - Bireley's Sarasara Tomato
  - Bireley's Bottle Breakfast series
- Cafeo (a café au lait)
- Dodekamin (vitamin drink)
- Fauchon (a black tea)
- Fiber 7500
- Fine Straight Tea
- Gyugyutto Shimikomu Collagen Water (a "diet" water containing collagen)
- Ichigeki (sports drink)
- Ikkyūchappa Ūroncha (Oolong tea made from top grade leaves)
- Jūrokucha (十六茶, a blend of 16 teas)
- Kōcha Pūarucha (a pu-erh tea)
- Kuchidoke Cocoa ("kuchidoke" means "melts in your mouth", only sold during winter)
- Kuromugicha (a rye tea)
- Mitsuya Cider
- Sansōsui (oxygen water)
- Super H²O (sports drink)
- Tōchō Ūroncha (Oolong tea sold at 7-Eleven stores)
- Vanadium Tennen Mizu (natural mineral water containing vanadium)
- Wakamusha (若武者, meaning "young samurai," a green tea)
- White Milk Tea
- Wilkinson
  - Ginger ale (dry and golden)
  - Tonic water
  - Tansan sparkling water (from 炭酸 tansan - carbonated)
- Wonda (canned coffee, under license from AGF)
  - Wonda Morning Shot
  - Wonda Shot & Shot 69
  - Wonda 100-nen Black

=== Discontinued products ===
- Cha-Tea (a black tea)
- Mitsuya Coffee/Nova/J.O. (coffee, became Wonda)
- Ocha Dōzo (a green tea introduced at the same time as Jūrokucha)
- Tea Quality (a black tea)
- TeaO (a black tea)
- Umacha (a green tea, replaced by Wakamusha)
  - Nigorase Umacha

== See also ==
- Asahi Breweries
