= Ramkhamhaeng (disambiguation) =

Ramkhamhaeng was a Thai king in the Sukhothai period.

Ramkhamhaeng or Ram Khamhaeng may also refer to:

- Ram Khamhaeng inscription, a stone inscription claimed to have been created by Ram Khamhaeng
- Ramkhamhaeng University, a Thai university
- Ramkhamhaeng Road, a road in Bangkok
- Hua Mak, an area in Bangkok also popularly known as Ramkhamhaeng
