= Vitamilk =

Thai soy milk brand

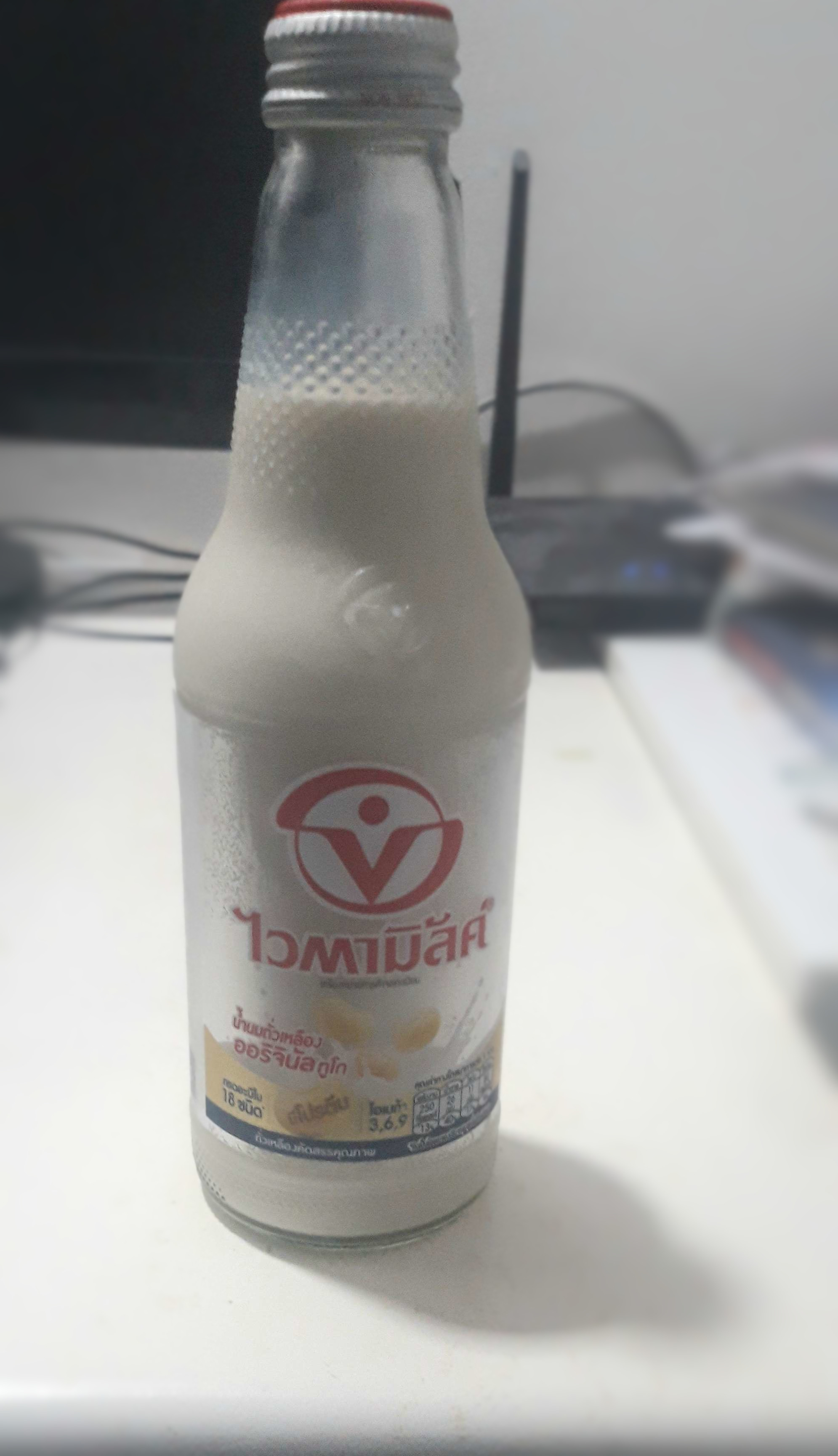
A bottle of Vitamilk, original flavour

Vitamilk is a soy milk product produced by Thailand's Green Spot Co., Ltd. Vitamilk was introduced in 1958 as the first ready-to-drink soy milk brand in Thailand, and is now (as of 2019) second in market share at 27 percent, following the market leader Lactasoy at 55 percent.

Green Spot Co., Ltd. was established by banker/entrepreneur Chin Sophonpanich in 1954 as the local bottler for the Green Spot brand of orange drink. The company's soy milk products now account for 95 percent of its revenue, 30 percent of which comes from exports, mainly to Asia and Africa.

== History ==
In 1934, Green Spot Co., Ltd. was founded in the United States and began selling an orange-flavored soft drink under the Green Spot brand, eventually expanding distribution to other countries, including Thailand.

In 1954, Green Spot entered the Thai market by establishing a bottling plant in Thailand in partnership with a Thai-Chinese financier “Chin Sophonpanich”. Later in 1958, the company officially launched its soy milk in Thailand under the “Vitamilk” brand, which became the first ready-to-drink soy milk product sold in glass bottles in Thailand.

== Manufacturing and process ==
Green Spot Co., Ltd.’s first manufacturing plant in Thailand was established in 1953, which produced orange-flavored soft drink. Later in 1958, the plant began producing Vitamilk drink, which was subsequently introduced to the market for the first time.

In 1973, the company opened a 8.70 acre manufacturing facility in Hua Mak, Bangkok, to respond to its expanding business operations. Later on, the facility became the company's headquarters. In 1991, Green Spot established a new manufacturing facility in Rangsit, covering an area of approximately 28.8 acres, in response to the expansion of its product line called “Vitamilk to Go,” which contains glass bottles.

The company opened a new manufacturing plant in Saraburi Province in 2016, which became its third manufacturing facility. The plant has the capacity to produce more or less than 1 million glass bottles of Vitamilk per day.

Dr. Matar Patchkhikw, Production Planning Manager at the Green Spot Co., Ltd., has described the production process, from the importation of soybeans and cooking process until the bottling stage.

== Vitamilk product range and variants ==
Vitamilk offers a range of soy milk products in different formulations, flavors, and packaging formats. Iles product range includes Original Soy Milk, Vitamilk UHT, Vitamilk Togo, Vitamilk V-Soy and Vitamilk Champ.

Vitamilk’s product range includes:

- Vitamilk Low Sugar
- Vitamilk Choco Shake
- Vitamilk Energy
- Vitamilk Corn
- Vitamilk Vegetarian

V-soy is positioned towards older customers. The product uses soybeans imported from Canada, which is made from non-GMO soybeans. The products are formulated to provide nutritional benefits from soy.

Vitamilk Champ target group is towards young children. The product contains nutrients intended to support children's nutrient needs, including Choline in Phosphatidylcholine, Omega-3, Omega-6, Omega-9 and high amounts of vitamin B12.

== Nutrition Plan ==
Green spot Co. Ltd. has offered products with different nutritional products to meet varying consumer needs, including Vitamilk, V-Soy and Vitamilk Champ.

Vitamilk

Original-flavored Vitamilk is made purely from whole soybeans and provides plant-based protein.

Vitamilk 300 milliliter carton also contains omega-3, omega-6 and omega-9. The primary ingredients include soy milk, with added sugar, vegetable oil, milk powder, and vitamin and mineral complexes.

V-Soy

V-Soy is made from whole soybeans and provides soy protein, high calcium and no preservatives are added.

It contains vitamin D (50% Thai RDI), isoflavones, omega-3, omega-6, omega-9, and lecithin. The primary ingredients include soy milk, calcium compounds, vitamin, mineral complexes, stabilizers, and emulsifiers.

Vitamilk champ

Vitamilk Champ is made purely from natural soybeans and provides high-quality soy protein. The product is also lactose-free, as it contains no milk powder, and has no added sugar.

Vitamilk 180 milliliter carton contains calcium (35% Thai RDI) and vitamin D (30% Thai RDI), as well as choline, omega-3, omega-6, omega-9, vitamin B12 and PDX dietary fiber.

== Distribution and pricing ==
Vitamilk is a brand operated by Green Spot Co. Ltd.

Anan Theerawitchayakul, the company’s Marketing Manager, said, “BEST START - Starting Good Things with Protein from Vitamilk,” which was launched in early 2023 to motivate the soy milk market. Vitamilk’s digital marketing strategy focused on using Key opinion leaders (KOLs) and influencers as communication tools to reach target groups. The strategy aims to build a consumer base among younger generations and establish them as long-term consumers in the future.

Vitamilk is positioned as an affordable soy milk product in Thailand, with prices varying depending on the product and package sizes.

- Vitamilk Original 432 baht for a 36-box pack, equivalent to 12 baht per carton.
- V-Soy 540 baht for a 36-box pack, equivalent to 15 baht per carton.
- Vitamilk champ 576 baht for a 48 box pack, equivalent to 12 baht per carton.

== Advertising ==
Vitamilk, a leading brand in Thailand’s soy milk market, launched the “BEST START” - Starting Good Things with Protein from Vitamilk, a companion to encourage Thai consumers to pay more attention to their breakfast. This campaign featured Mario Maurer, a famous Thai actor as its brand ambassador and promoted Vitamilk as a convenient source of soy protein for daily consumption.

The word “BEST START” can be seen as a concept of starting a day with proper nutrition. According to the campaign, more than 50% of consumers skipped their first meal when time passed. Vitamilk positioned its products as a convenient option for consumers seeking a quick way to receive nutrients during a busy morning.
