= Rat Phatthana, Bangkok =

Rat Phatthana ราษฎร์พัฒนา
- Khwaeng
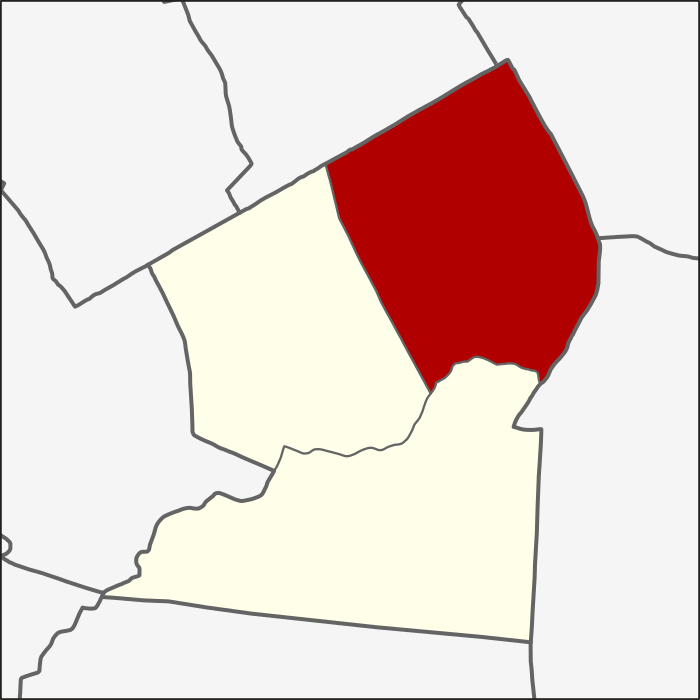
- Location in Saphan Sung District
- Coordinates: 13°46′6.79″N 100°42′19.17″E
- Country: Thailand
- Province: Bangkok
- Khet: Saphan Sung

Area
  - Total: 9.009 km^{2} (3.478 sq mi)

Population (2020)
  - Total: 42,606
- Time zone: UTC+7 (ICT)
- Postal code: 10240
- TIS 1099: 104402

Rat Phatthana (Thai: ราษฎร์พัฒนา, pronounced [râːt pʰát.tʰā.nāː]) is a khwaeng (subdistrict) of Saphan Sung District, in Bangkok, Thailand. In 2020, it had a total population of 42,606 people.

== Toponymy ==
The name Rat Phatthana means "developed by the people". It gets its name from the road of the same name that runs through the area. The road is known locally as Soi Mistine (ซอยมีสทีน). A side street branching off the main street, Ramkhamhaeng Road (Soi Ramkhamhaeng 160). An alley named after Mistine, a brand of Thai cosmetics with production base here.
