= Juroku Cha =

Blended tea drink

Juroku Cha (十六茶) is a blended tea drink produced and distributed by Asahi Soft Drinks in Japan. The drink was originally created and sold by Chanson Cosmetics as a dry blended green tea. In March 1993, Chanson and Asahi Soft Drinks released the proprietary blend as a canned product. In February 2007, the packaging and flavor was updated.

== Description ==
The name Juroku Cha refers to a tea made using sixteen ingredients including leaves, grains, and fruits such as Coix lacryma-jobi var. ma-yuen, barley, kuromame (black soybeans), brown rice, habucha, mulberry leaves, jiaogulan, kombu, lingzhi, sasa veitchii, persimmon, sesame, mikan peel, eucommia, black rice, and perilla leaves. All of these contain dietary fiber (mostly indigestible dextrin), and the drink is considered a designated health food in Japan. A decaffeinated version is also available.

== Promotion ==
The drink is sold as "Jūrokucha with your meal" to emphasize its healthfulness. The drink is promoted as especially helpful to diabetics who wish to control their sugar levels after a meal due to the sugar-suppressing ingredients contained in it. Celebrities who have appeared in commercials for the health drink include Yūki Amami, Satomi Kobayashi, Izumi Inamori, Koji Uehara, Tomoko Tabata, Norika Fujiwara, and Mikako Ichikawa.

== Impact ==
Due to the popularity of Juroku Cha, several other companies have released similar products. Kyushu Railway Company released a product called "Nijūyoncha" (literally "twenty-four teas"), Sangaria has a drink called "Nijūitcha" (literally "twenty-one teas"), Coca-Cola distributes a drink called "Sōkenbicha" which has 12 teas combined, and a Korean company distributes a drink blended from 17 teas.
