= Hua Mak =

Hua Mak หัวหมาก
- Khwaeng
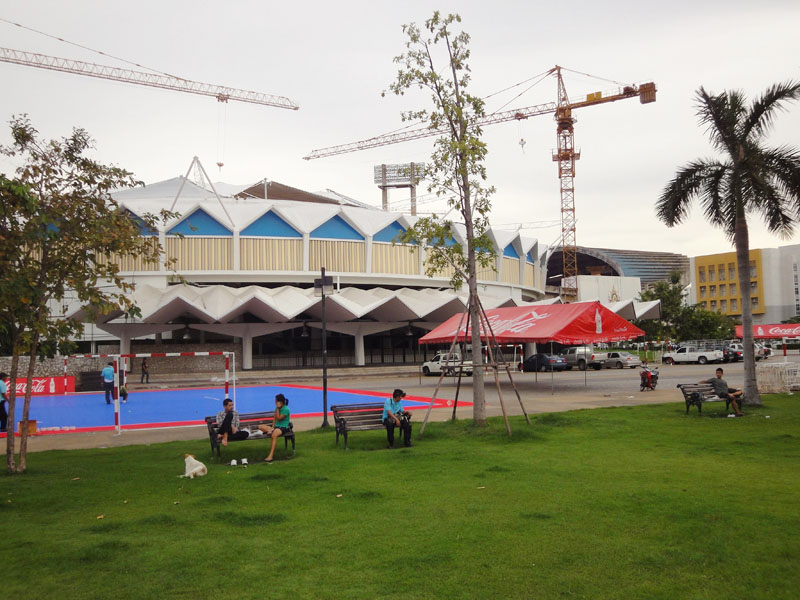
- Indoor Stadium Huamark

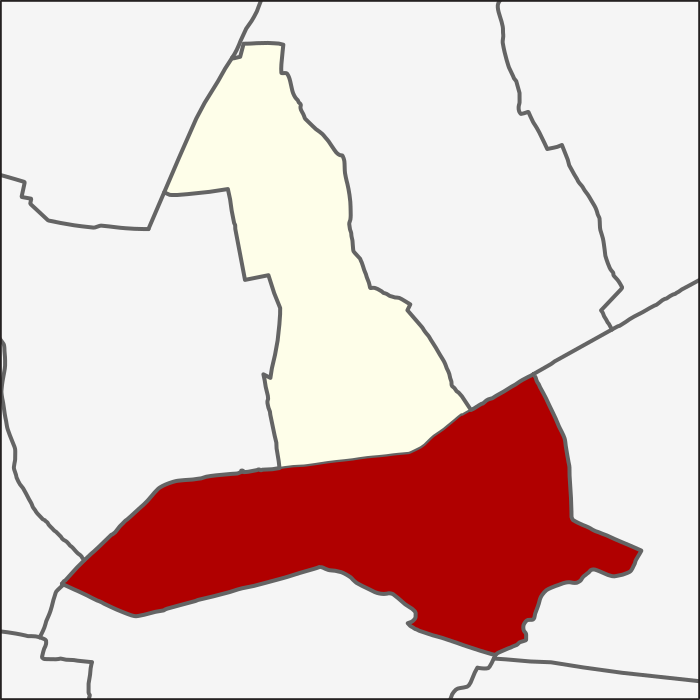
- Location in Bang Kapi District
- Coordinates: 13°45′21″N 100°38′28″E
- Country: Thailand
- Province: Bangkok
- Khet: Bang Kapi

Area
  - Total: 16.461 km^{2} (6.356 sq mi)

Population (2020)
  - Total: 67,798
- Time zone: UTC+7 (ICT)
- Postal code: 10240, 10250
- TIS 1099: 100608

Hua Mak (Thai: หัวหมาก, pronounced [hǔa̯ màːk]) is a khwaeng (subdistrict) of Bang Kapi District, in Bangkok, Thailand. In 2020, it had a total population of 67,798 people.

== History ==
Hua Mak originally had a much wider territory than today. It extends to the present-day Suan Luang area. Khlong Saen Saep, the longest man-made khlong (canal) in the country, runs through this area. Hua Mak was the end of the first phase of Khlong Saen Saep, known as "Khlong Saen Saep Tai" (คลองแสนแสบใต้; south Saen Saep canal) with no evidence of when it was excavated. The second phase of Khlong Saen Saep, commonly known as Khlong Saen Saep Nuea (คลองแสนแสบเหนือ; north Saen Saep canal) is a continuous route up until it ends when it confluence the Bang Pakong River in Chachoengsao Province in the east region. Khlong Saen Saep was dug mostly by Muslim and Chinese labourers. When the canal was completed, Rama III allowed these Muslim workers to settle on either side of the canal along the way. Assumed that the name "Hua Mak" is related to Khlong Saen Saep as well as Khlong Tan.

== Geography ==
Hua Mak is the southern part of Bang Kapi District. Adjacent subdistricts are (from the north clockwise): Phlapphla in Wang Thonglang District, Khlong Chan in its district, Khlong Kum in Bueng Kum District (Khlong Saen Saep is a boundary line), Saphan Sung and Thap Chang in Saphan Sung District (Khlong Ban Ma 2, Khlong Wang Bon Yai, Khlong Kho Lat, Khlong Bueng Ban Ma are the boundary lines), Phatthanakan and Suan Luang in Suan Luang District (Demarcation Ditch, Khlong Hua Mak, Khlong Kacha are the boundary lines), and Bang Kapi in Huai Khwang District (Khlong Saen Saep is a boundary line).

== Places ==
- Ramkhamhaeng University (RU)
- Assumption University of Thailand (ABAC)
- Rajamangala National Stadium and Indoor Stadium Huamark
