= Bireley's =

Soft drink brand

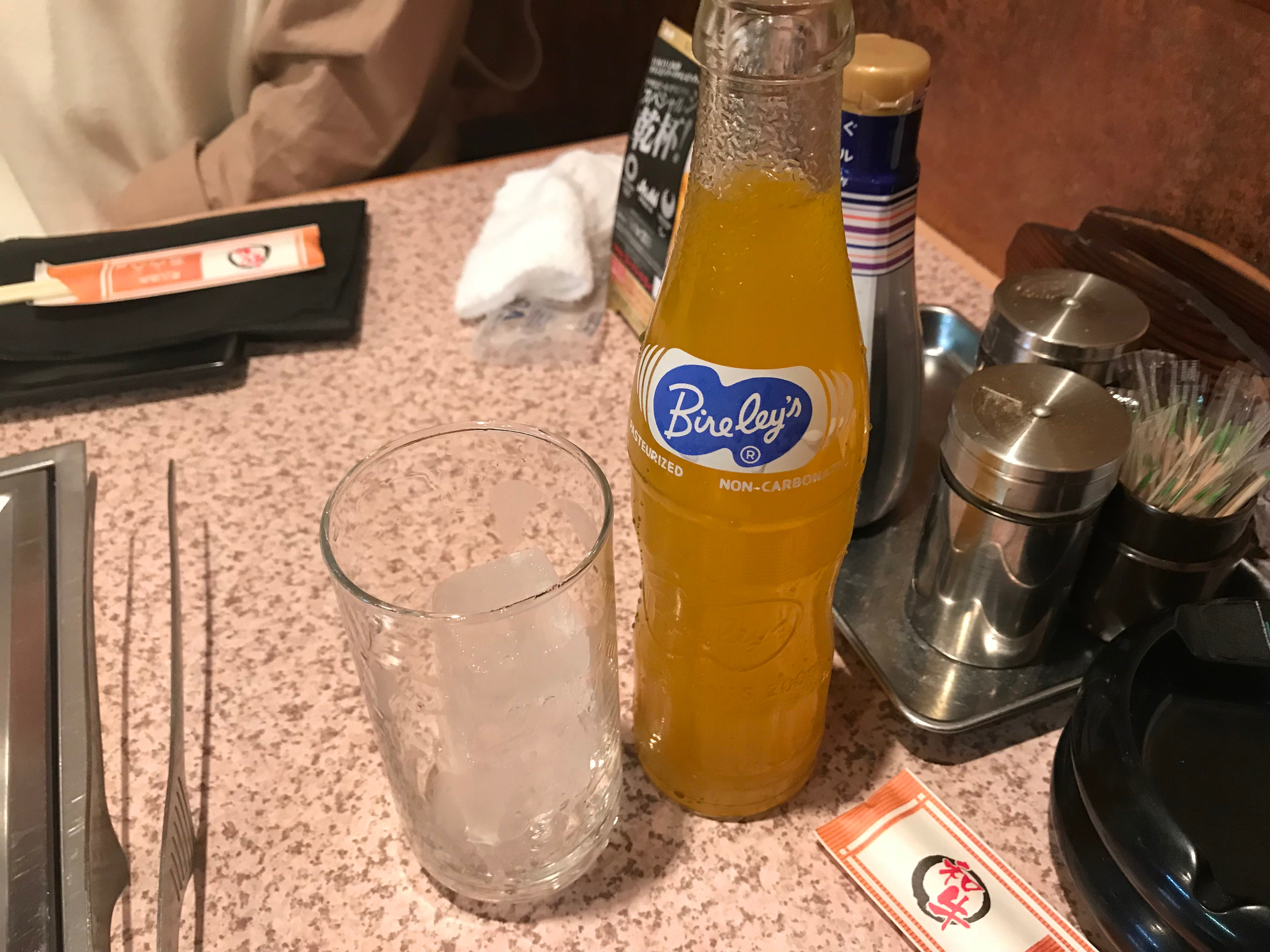
A Japanese Bireley's drink bottle

Bireley's is a brand of non-carbonated, fruit-flavored soft drinks originally produced by the Frank W. Bireley Company (later Bireley's Inc.), established in California in 1923 by Frank W. Bireley. The brand grew rapidly, becoming known throughout the United States, and was acquired by General Foods in 1943. It subsequently disappeared from the market in its home country, but still retains a small international presence through Asahi Soft Drinks in Japan and, until 2019, Ichitan in Thailand. As of 2024, the brand is exclusively found in Japan.

== History ==
The Bireley's brand originated from Frank Bireley's orange juice business, which began with him selling fresh squeezed juice to fellow students while studying at Stanford University. The business became very successful, and Bireley dropped out of university and established the Frank W. Bireley Company in 1923. The original product, known as Bireley's Orangeade, was first produced at the company's main plant in North Hollywood. The company later opened a bottling plant in Oakland in 1937, and established franchises with local bottlers throughout the United States. The company developed and patented an automated juice extractor system for its operations, which involved juicing, pasteurization and concentration at the main factory, then shipment for reconstitution and sweetening with sugar at the bottling plants. The drink's marketing promoted its lack of carbonation as a benefit. By 1942, the company was producing about 58 million bottles of the beverage a month, and Bireley had become known as the "orange juice king".

The company was acquired by General Foods in 1943, becoming a division under its new parent, with Bireley staying on as general manager. Several new flavors were introduced, and the brand expanded overseas, establishing presences under the name Bireley's California Orange in several countries, including in Thailand in 1950. In Japan, the drink was produced by Asahi Soft Drinks beginning in 1951. The brand enjoyed popularity in many countries during the 1950s, including the Philippines. In Thailand, the brand became a household name not only after the drink's popularity, but also the notoriety of the 1950s gangster Dang Bireley, who gained the moniker from that of the neighborhood where he lived, near the Bireley's bottling plant. (He was also the inspiration for the 1997 film Dang Bireley's and Young Gangsters.) Throughout the 1960’s and into the 1970’s, Bireley’s also had a strong relationship with Toho Pictures in Japan, and bottles of the drink in addition to its branding were commonly featured as product placement in the studio’s kaiju films.

In 1959, General Foods sold its Bireley's operations to Chicago-based dairy ingredients supplier Krim-Ko. The brand subsequently disappeared from most markets over the following few decades. By the 1990s, its international operations, by then owned by Reginald Lewis's TLC Beatrice, remained only in Thailand (in addition to Japan, where Asahi had acquired trademark rights in 1980). TLC Beatrice sold its interest in Bireley's California Orange (Thailand) to Pokka Singapore in 2000, but Pokka soon offloaded the acquisition, which continued to operate at a loss, to Thai investors in 2003. In 2010, the Thai group, under the name Sunny Herb International Beverage, acquired the rights to the Bireley's brand in all twenty countries where it was registered, except Japan. The rights, as well as all of the Bireley's business and facilities in Thailand, were in turn sold to the Thai beverage manufacturer Ichitan for 1.78 billion baht (US$55 million) in 2014. Ichitan had expected to revive the ailing brand and re-expand into foreign markets, but despite initially successful marketing, the efforts failed to perform up to expectations. The product line was discontinued in 2019, leaving Japan as the only market where the brand is still found.

== See also ==
- Green Spot (soft drink), another orange drink from California that gained wider popularity in Asia
