= Frank W. Bireley =

American businessman (1899–1960)

- Born: 1899; Los Angeles, California
- Died: 1960 (aged 60–61)

Frank Woolsey Bireley (1899–1960) was an American businessman and inventor, known for creating the eponymous Bireley's brand of soft drinks, popular during the 1940s–1950s.

Bireley was born in Los Angeles, and started an orange juice business to finance his studies at Stanford University. The business became very successful, prompting Bireley to drop out of university and establish his own company in 1923. He developed his own machinery to streamline the production process, and is credited as having patented the first automated juice extractor. His success led him to become known as the "orange juice king". The company, Birley's, Inc., was acquired by General Foods in 1943, and he continued in its leadership as a division under the new parent.

Bireley married his wife, Christine Harriet Bireley (1916–1996) in 1935, and settled in Toluca Lake. They had three children. Bireley was friends with the aviator Amelia Earhart, and, an aviation enthusiast himself, taught the future World-War-II pilot Frank Kurtz to fly. Bireley died in 1960, after which his wife served as president of the Bireley Foundation, the charitable organization established in his memory.
