= Greenspot (disambiguation) =

Greenspot is a hamlet in Saskatchewan, Canada.

Greenspot may also refer to:

- Greenspot, Contra Costa County, California
- Greenspot, San Bernardino County, California

== See also ==
- Green Spot (disambiguation)
