= Mitsuya Cider =

Japanese carbonated soft drink created in 1884

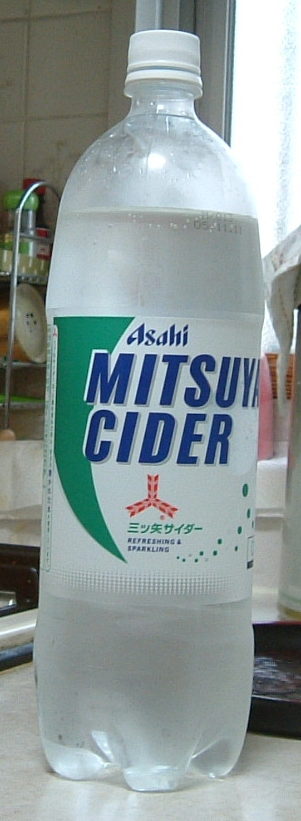
Mitsuya Cider in a PET bottle

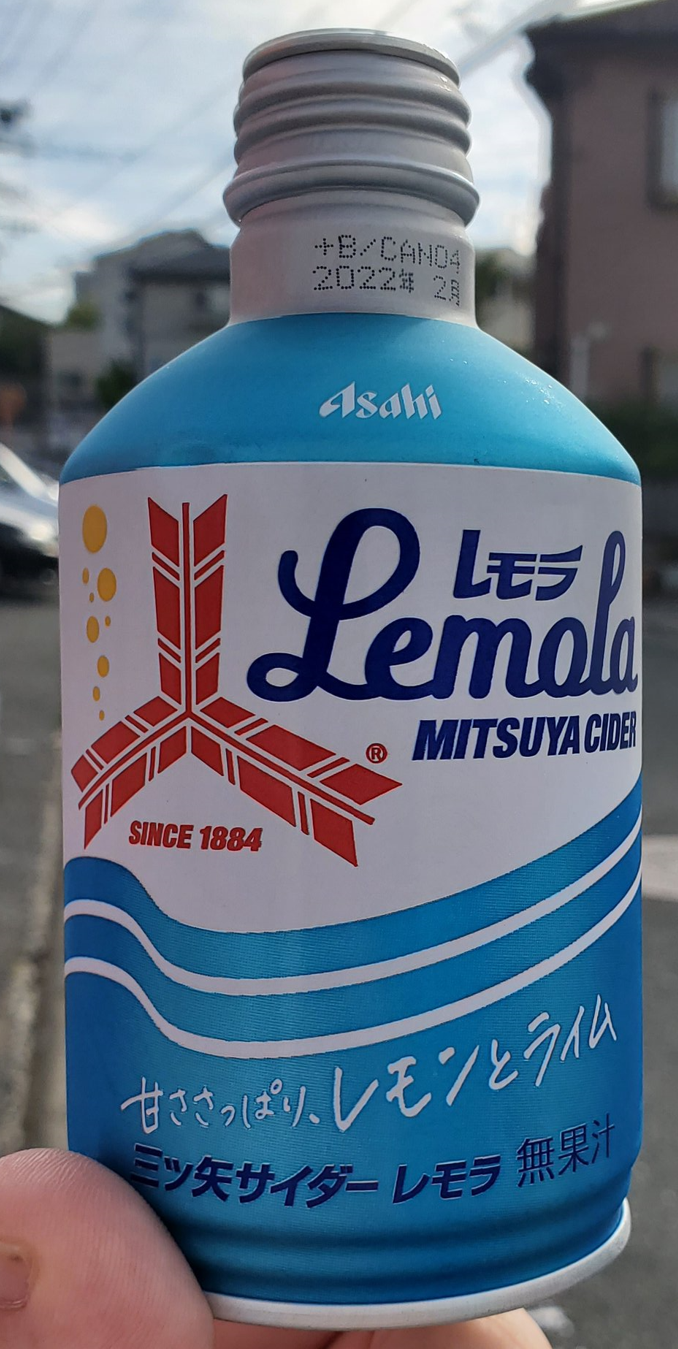
Mitsuya Cider - Lemola flavor, in a metal can from a vending machine

Mitsuya Cider (三ツ矢サイダー, Mitsuya Saidā) is a Japanese carbonated soft drink, created in 1884 and acquired by Asahi Soft Drinks in 1972.

While branded as a "cider", the East Asian use of "cider" refers to a very different drink from that typically referred to in English: the basic flavor can be described as a cross between a lemon-lime drink and ginger ale, though Asahi has formulated and introduced additional flavors, including grape, lemon, mikan and white peach. Occasionally, Mitsuya Cider will release its "White Cider" version with its own variations, which include "White Cider with Melon". In 2020, Asahi re-released a Shōwa-era flavor, "Lemola" for a limited time (still available in mid-2022). Lemola is a lemon-lime flavor.

Mitsuya Cider used to be sold exclusively in ornately decorated metal bottles and cans, as well as in glass bottles, but is now sold primarily in plastic bottles. The old-style metal bottles are still available in many vending machines and convenience stores for customers who prefer the nostalgic packaging.

Also on the market are small hard candies marked with the same logo as the cider bottles, and a carbonation effect. The candy is made by mixing its ingredients and heating them until they melt, then exposing the mixture to pressurized carbon dioxide gas (about 4,137 kPa or 600 psi) and allowing it to cool. The process causes tiny high-pressure bubbles to be trapped inside the candy. When placed in the mouth, upon coming into contact with saliva, the candy breaks and dissolves, releasing the carbon dioxide, resulting in a popping and sizzling sound and leaving a slight tingling sensation. The bubbles in the candy pieces can be viewed when aided by a microscope. This process is similar to Pop Rocks, but the resulting candy is spherical and of average size, about 2 cm in diameter.

Mitsuya Cider gained exposure in the West during 2008 as a result of the Rickrolling internet meme, since Rick Astley was the face of the brand during the late 1980s and early 1990s. Rick Astley was featured in some of its TV commercials in Japan during the late 80s.
