= Thap Chang, Bangkok =

Thap Chang ทับช้าง
- Khwaeng
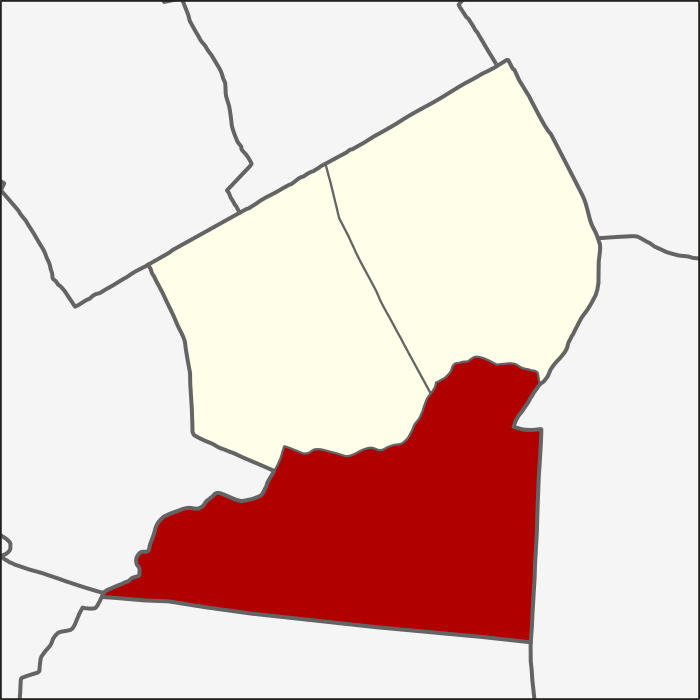
- Location in Saphan Sung District
- Country: Thailand
- Province: Bangkok
- Khet: Saphan Sung

Area
  - Total: 10.968 km^{2} (4.235 sq mi)

Population (2020)
  - Total: 25,273
- Time zone: UTC+7 (ICT)
- Postal code: 10250
- TIS 1099: 104403

Thap Chang (Thai: ทับช้าง, pronounced [tʰáp t͡ɕʰáːŋ]) is a khwaeng (subdistrict) of Saphan Sung District, in Bangkok, Thailand. In 2020, it had a total population of 25,273 people.

== Naming ==
Believed that the name Thap Chang, which literally means "elephant encampment," derives from the area having served as a resting place for elephants used in the Siamese–Vietnamese wars, a series of prolonged conflicts that lasted for more than 14 years (2331–2338 and 2376–2390 BE), during the reign of King Rama III in the early Rattanakosin period. This was because the Khlong Saen Saep runs through the area; the canal was dug specifically to facilitate the transport of troops and military supplies for these campaigns.
