= Nihon Pharmaceutical University =

Private university in Saitama, Japan

Coordinates: 35°59′28″N 139°37′1.8″E

- 日本薬科大学
- Established: 2004
- Location: Ina, Saitama, Japan

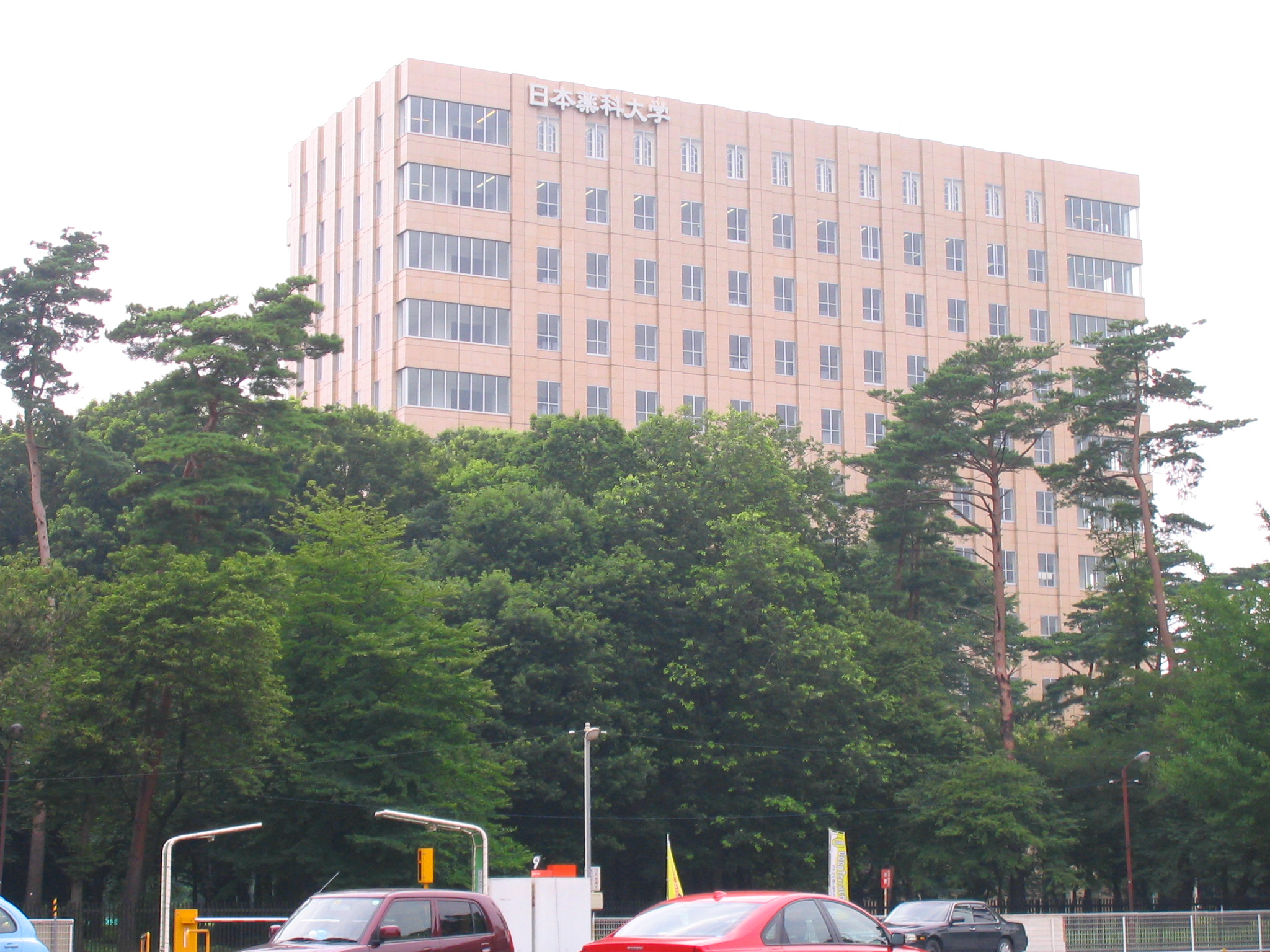
Nihon Pharmaceutical University

Nihon Pharmaceutical University (日本薬科大学, Nihon yakka daigaku) is a private university in Ina, Saitama, Japan, established in 2004.
