= Green Spot (soft drink) =

Orange drink brand

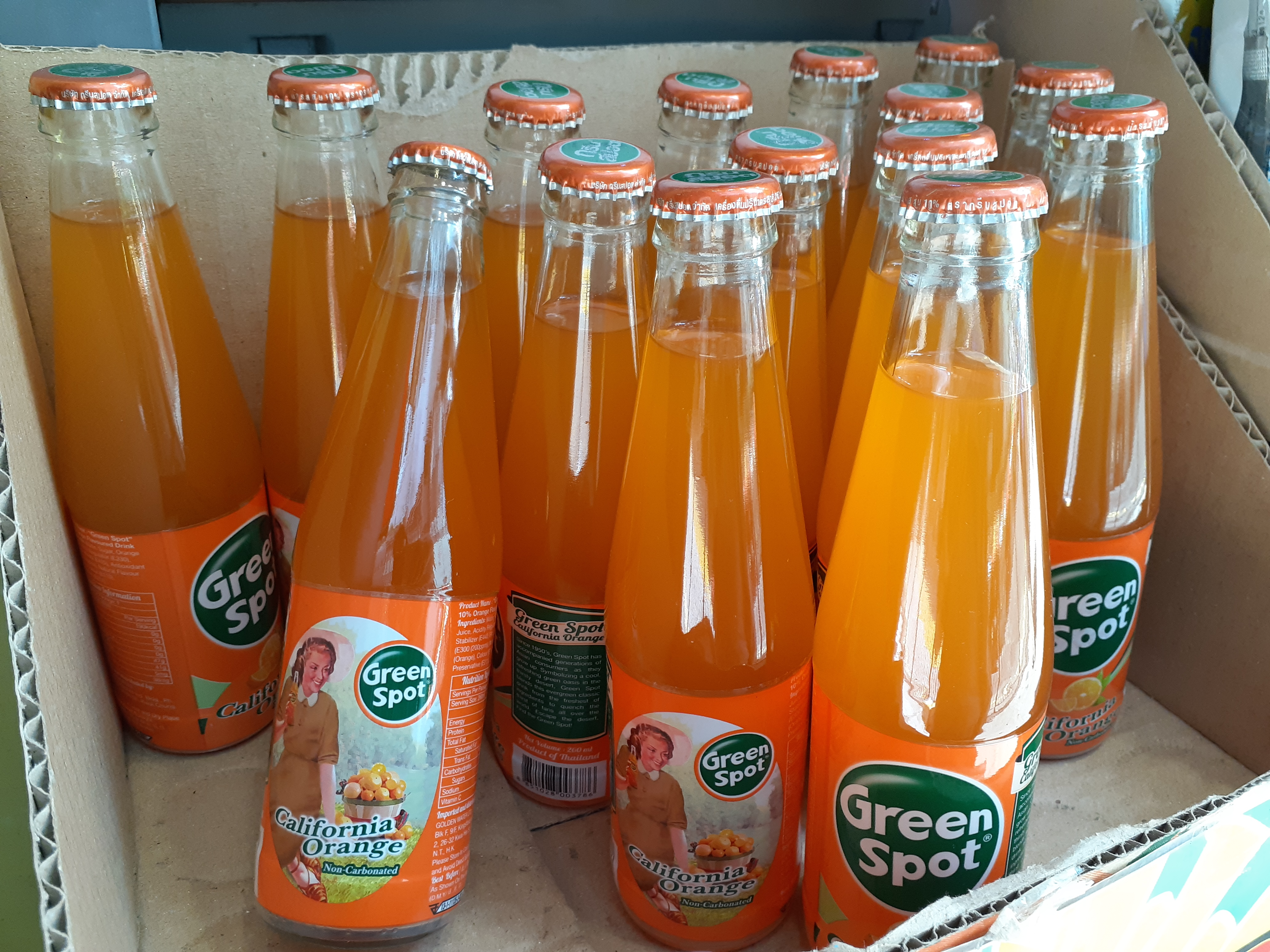
- Green Spot drinks exported by Thailand in a Hong Kong store, 2020
- Type: Orange drink
- Origin: United States
- Introduced: 1934; 92 years ago
- Color: Orange

Green Spot is a brand of non-carbonated, non-caffeinated orange-based soft drink originating in the United States but today produced in Thailand and Venezuela.

Green Spot was established in the United States in 1934, based in Claremont, California. The brand soon expanded internationally, and had a presence in Shanghai by the late 1930s. It established operations in Hong Kong in 1950 (by K.C. Leong, in a partnership with Vitasoy), Singapore in 1952, Thailand in 1954 (by banker Chin Sophonpanich), Sarawak in 1957, as well as the Philippines and Indonesia, among others.

The soft drink was sold in the Netherlands as well. In 1962, the Dutch artist Wim T. Schippers emptied a bottle in the sea near Petten. He managed to make it an international news item.

Green Spot disappeared from the market in the United States around the 1960s and in most other countries thereafter. Its original company, Green Spot USA, now produces flavorings for beverages, ice-creams, and other food products. The beverage continues to be produced and sold in Thailand by Green Spot Co., Ltd. (which also produces the soy drink Vitamilk) and in Venezuela by Embotelladora Venezuela S.A.

== See also ==
- Bireley's, another orange drink from California that gained wider popularity in Asia
