= Saphan Sung district =

Saphan Sung สะพานสูง
- Khet
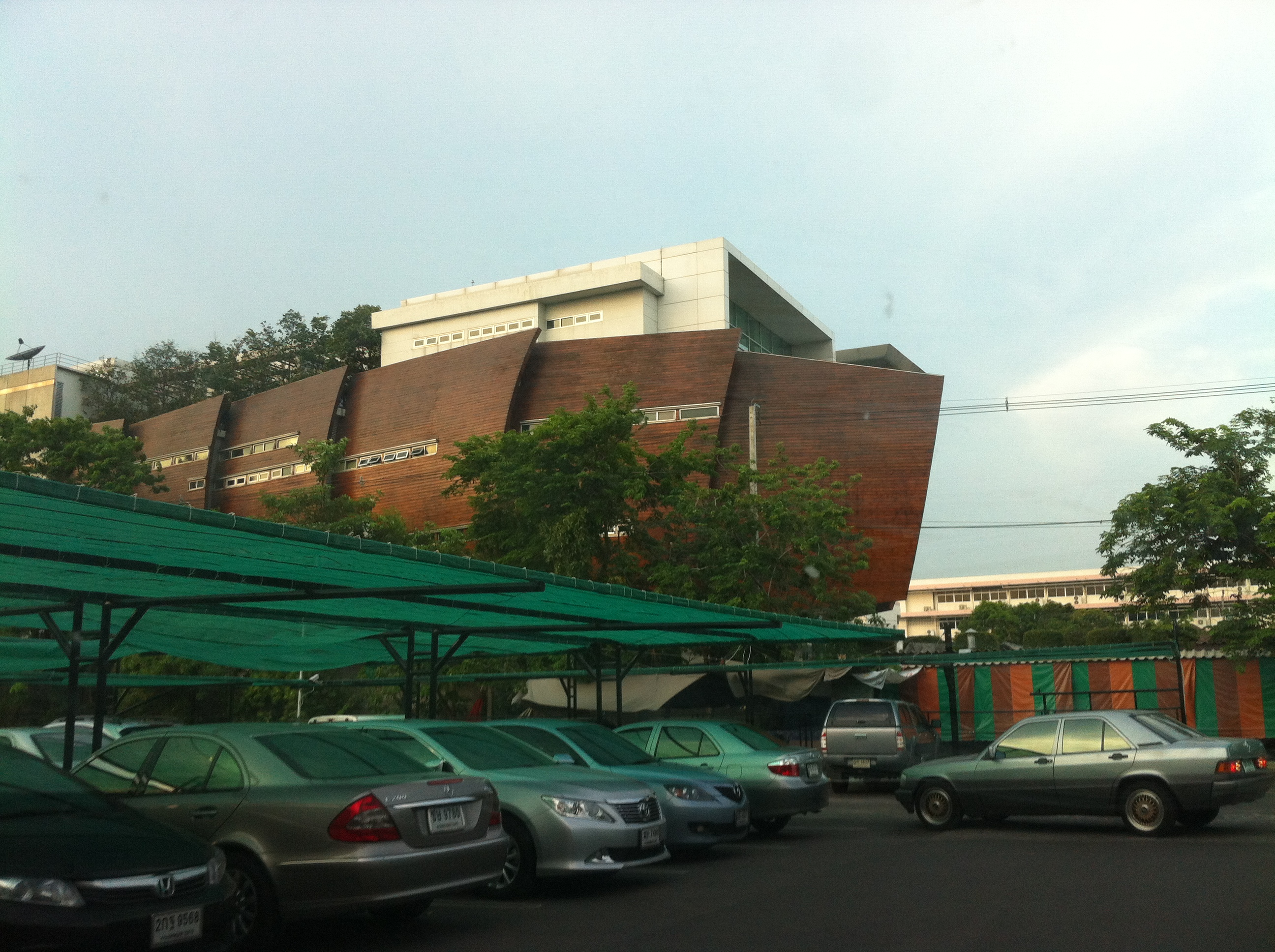
- View of the youth center, from the district office

- Khet location in Bangkok
- Coordinates: 13°46′12″N 100°41′5″E
- Country: Thailand
- Province: Bangkok
- Seat: Saphan Sung
- Khwaeng: 3
- Established: November 21, 1997

Area
  - Total: 28.124 km^{2} (10.859 sq mi)

Population (2017)
  - Total: 95,537
  - Density: 3,396.99/km^{2} (8,798.2/sq mi)
- Time zone: UTC+7 (THA)
- Postal code: 10240 except Khwaeng Thap Chang: 10250
- Geocode: 1044

Saphan Sung (Thai: สะพานสูง, pronounced [sā.pʰāːn sǔːŋ]) is one of the 50 districts (khet) of Bangkok, Thailand. Located on the eastern part of the capital, it is bounded by other Bangkok districts (from north clockwise): Khan Na Yao, Min Buri, Lat Krabang, Prawet, Suan Luang, Bang Kapi, and Bueng Kum. Most part of Saphan Sung district are low density residential area.

== History ==
Saphan Sung was separated from Bueng Kum on 14 October 1997 announcement, effective 21 November 1997, together with Khan Na Yao. Saphan Sung means tall bridge referring to the shape of bridge built over khlongs (Thai canals) back when boats were a main mode of transportation.

== Administration ==
The district has three sub-districts (khwaeng).

No.	Name	Thai	Area (km^{2})	Map
1.	Saphan Sung	สะพานสูง	8.147	Map
2.	Rat Phatthana	ราษฎร์พัฒนา	9.009	Map
3.	Thap Chang	ทับช้าง	10.968	Map
Total			28.124	Map

== Places ==
- Wat Lat Bua Khao (วัดลาดบัวขาว)
- Triam Udom Suksa Nomklao School
- Saphan Sung Discovery Learning Library
- Saphan Sung Youth Centre
- Pra-Ajahn Mitsuo Gavesako Foundation
- Al‑Yusra Mosque (Loh Lae)
- Nurul‑Iyahsan Mosque (Thap Chang Bon)
- Surao Thap Chang Khlong Bon School
- Ramkhamhaeng Hospital 2
- Kaset New Theory School
- Thai Animal Protection Association
- Sri Phruehta School

== District Council ==
Saphan Sung's district council had seven members serving four-year terms. In the election held on 30 April 2006, the Democrat Party won all seven seats. Bangkok held another district-council election in 2010, but subsequent legal changes suspended district councils; Bangkok now elects only the Bangkok Metropolitan Council.
