= Saphan Sung subdistrict =

Saphan Sung สะพานสูง
- Khwaeng
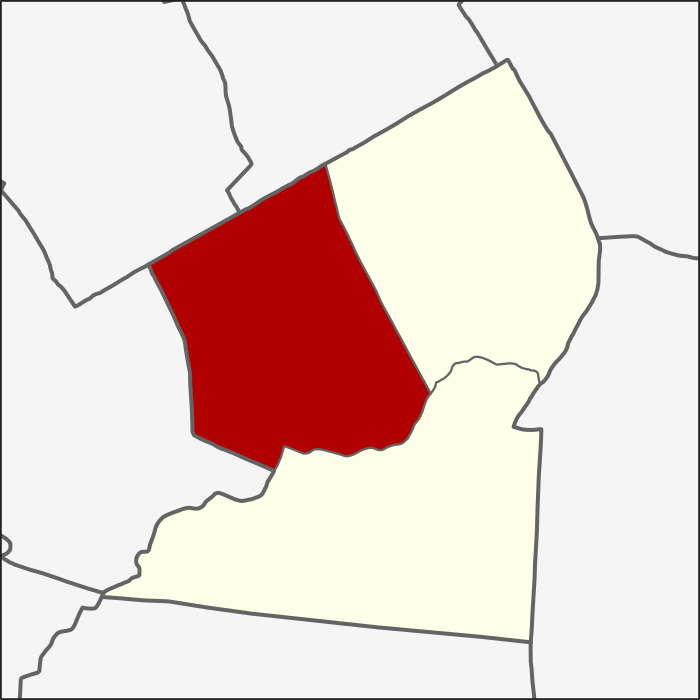
- Location in Saphan Sung District
- Country: Thailand
- Province: Bangkok
- Khet: Saphan Sung

Area
  - Total: 8.147 km^{2} (3.146 sq mi)

Population (2020)
  - Total: 28,213
- Time zone: UTC+7 (ICT)
- Postal code: 10240
- TIS 1099: 104401

Saphan Sung (Thai: สะพานสูง, pronounced [sā.pʰāːn sǔːŋ]) is a khwaeng (subdistrict) of Saphan Sung District, in Bangkok, Thailand. In 2020, it had a total population of 28,213 people.

== Toponymy ==
Saphan Sung is another historical settlement of many Muslim Bangkokians, the area's name means "Tall Bridges." It's believed that the name refers to many tall bridges built across the network of canals that ran through the agriculture farmland of the old days.
