= Khu Bon MRT station =

Railway station in Bangkok, Thailand

Khu Bon คู้บอน
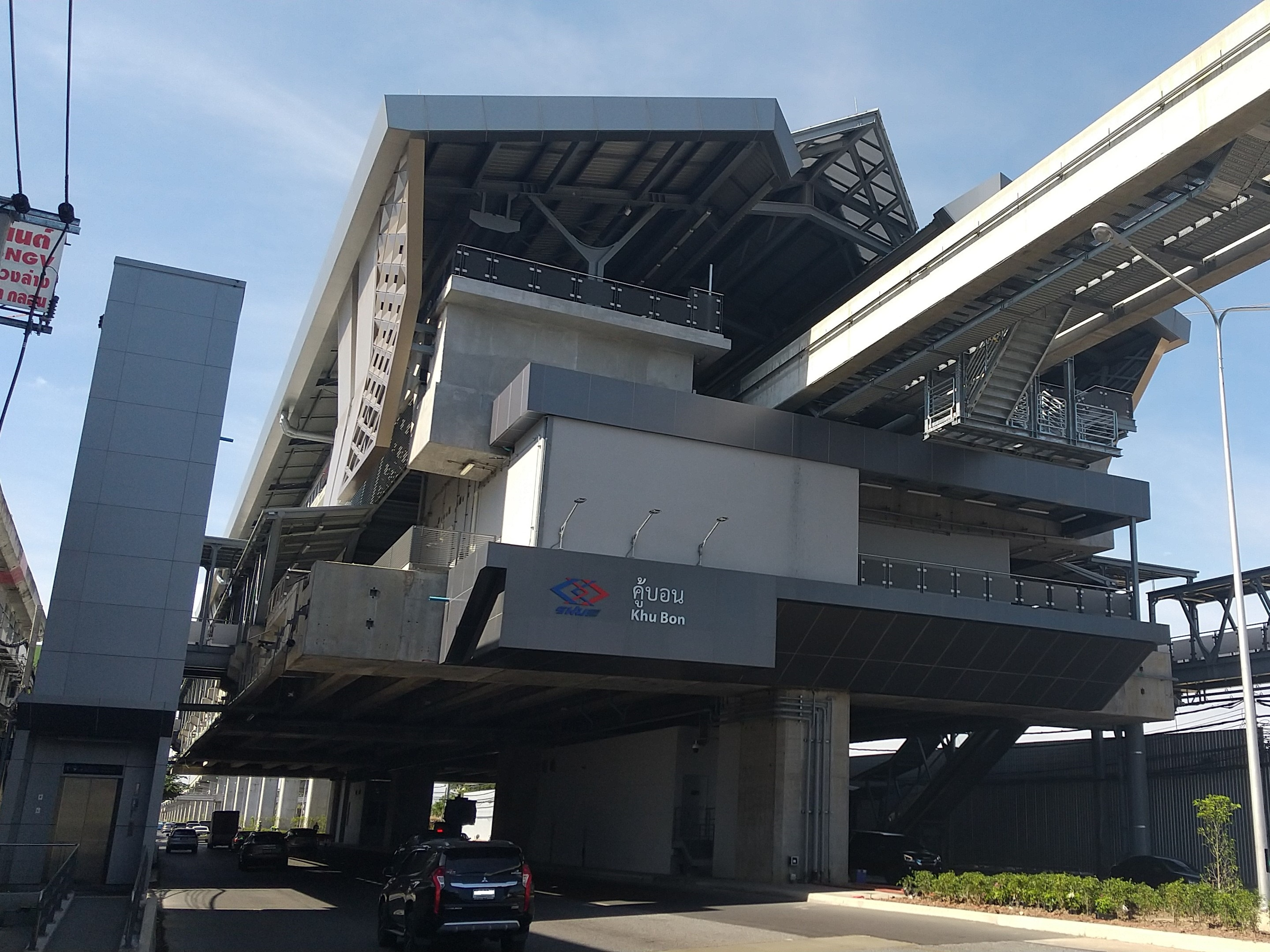

General information
- Location: Khan Na Yao District, Bangkok, Thailand
- System: MRT
- Owner: Mass Rapid Transit Authority of Thailand (MRTA)
- Operator: Northern Bangkok Monorail Company Limited
- Line: Pink Line

Other information
- Station code: PK23

History
- Opened: 21 November 2023

Services
Preceding station	Metropolitan Rapid Transit	Following station
Ram Inthra Kor Mor 6 towards Nonthaburi Civic Center	Pink Line	Ram Inthra Kor Mor 9 towards Min Buri
Location

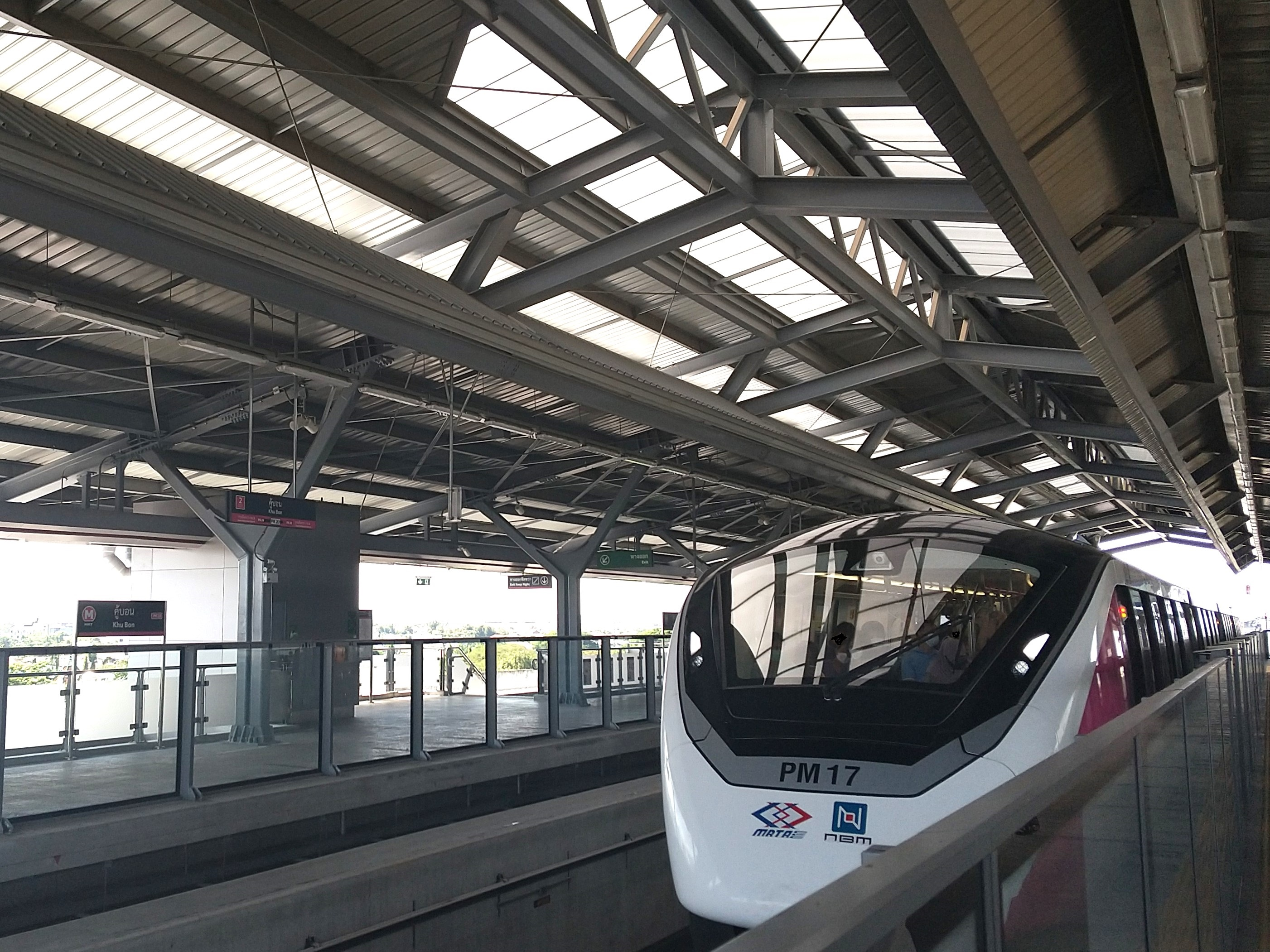
Platforms

Khu Bon station (Thai: สถานีคู้บอน) is a Bangkok MRT station on the Pink Line. The station is located on Ram Inthra Road, near Soi Ram Inthra 46 in Khan Na Yao district, Bangkok. The station has four exits. It opened on 21 November 2023 as part of trial operations on the entire Pink Line.
