= Neta Aya =

Battery electric subcompact crossover SUV

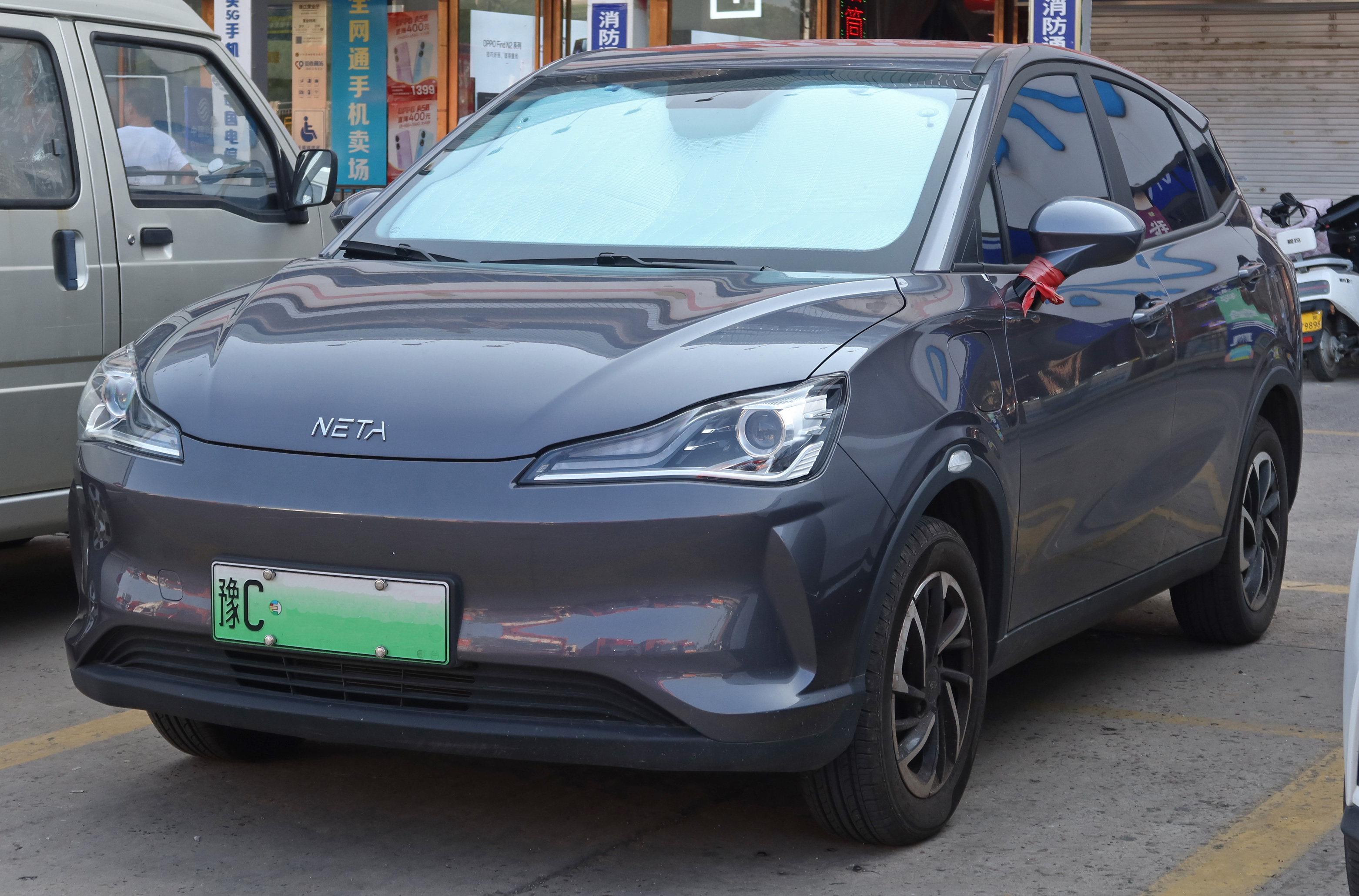
- Neta V (pre-facelift)

Overview
- Manufacturer: Hozon Auto
- Also called: Neta V (pre-facelift); Neta V-II (facelift, export)
- Production: 2020–2024 (China); 2023–2026 (export)
- Assembly: China: Zhejiang; Thailand: Bangkok (BGAC, V-II); Indonesia: Bekasi (HIM, V-II)

Body and chassis
- Class: Subcompact crossover SUV (B)
- Body style: 5-door SUV
- Layout: Front-motor, front-wheel-drive
- Platform: HPC 3.0 platform

Powertrain
- Electric motor: 1x AC PMSM
- Power output: 40–70 kW (54–94 hp; 54–95 PS)
- Battery: 35-55 kWh (Li-ion battery); Li-NMC (Pre-Facelift); LFP (Facelift)
- Electric range: 301–401 km (187–249 mi)
- Plug-in charging: 120 V (8 hours) (AC charging, 0 to 100); 240 V (30 minutes) (DC charging, 0 to 80)

Dimensions
- Wheelbase: 2,420 mm (95.3 in)
- Length: 4,070 mm (160.2 in)
- Width: 1,690 mm (66.5 in)
- Height: 1,540 mm (60.6 in)

Chronology
- Predecessor: Neta N01

The Neta Aya (Chinese: 哪吒Aya; pinyin: Nézhā Aya), previously named as Neta V, is a battery electric subcompact crossover SUV produced by Hozon Auto under the Neta (Nezha) brand, a Chinese all-electric car brand, which is built by the Zhejiang Hezhong New Energy Automobile Company. In August 2023, Neta V was renamed as Aya.

== Overview ==
The Neta V was launched in 2020. The Neta V rides on the HPC platform which is shared with the Neta U, and is powered by a single electric motor to the front axle shared with the Neta N01, with a power output of 75 bhp (56 kW; 76 PS) and 175 N⋅m (129 lb⋅ft) of torque. The Neta V is a battery electric vehicle equipped with a lithium-ion battery delivering a range of 401 km (249 mi) rated by NEDC. The Neta V accelerates from 0 to 50 km/h (0 to 31 mph) in 3.9 seconds.

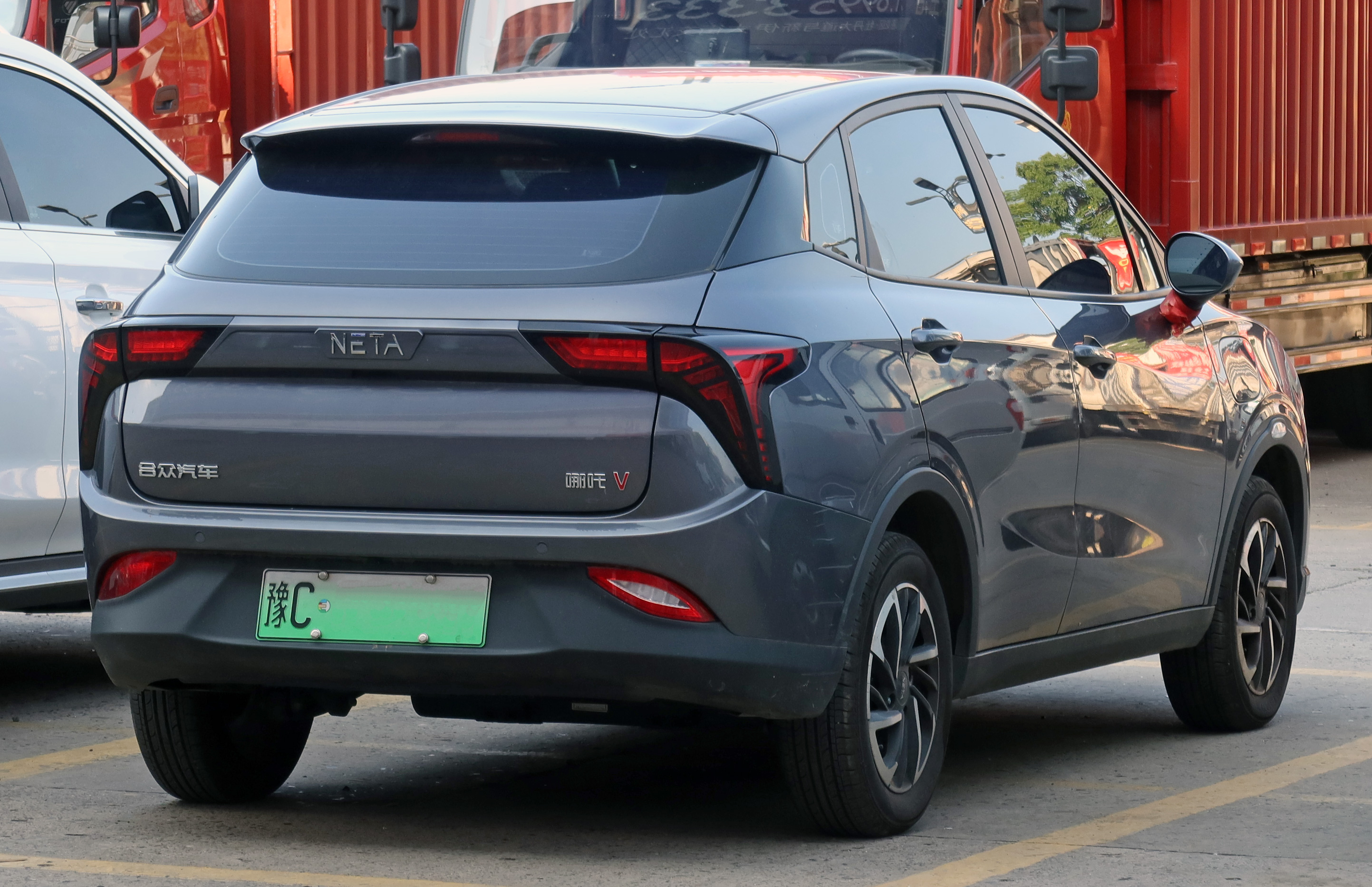
Rear view

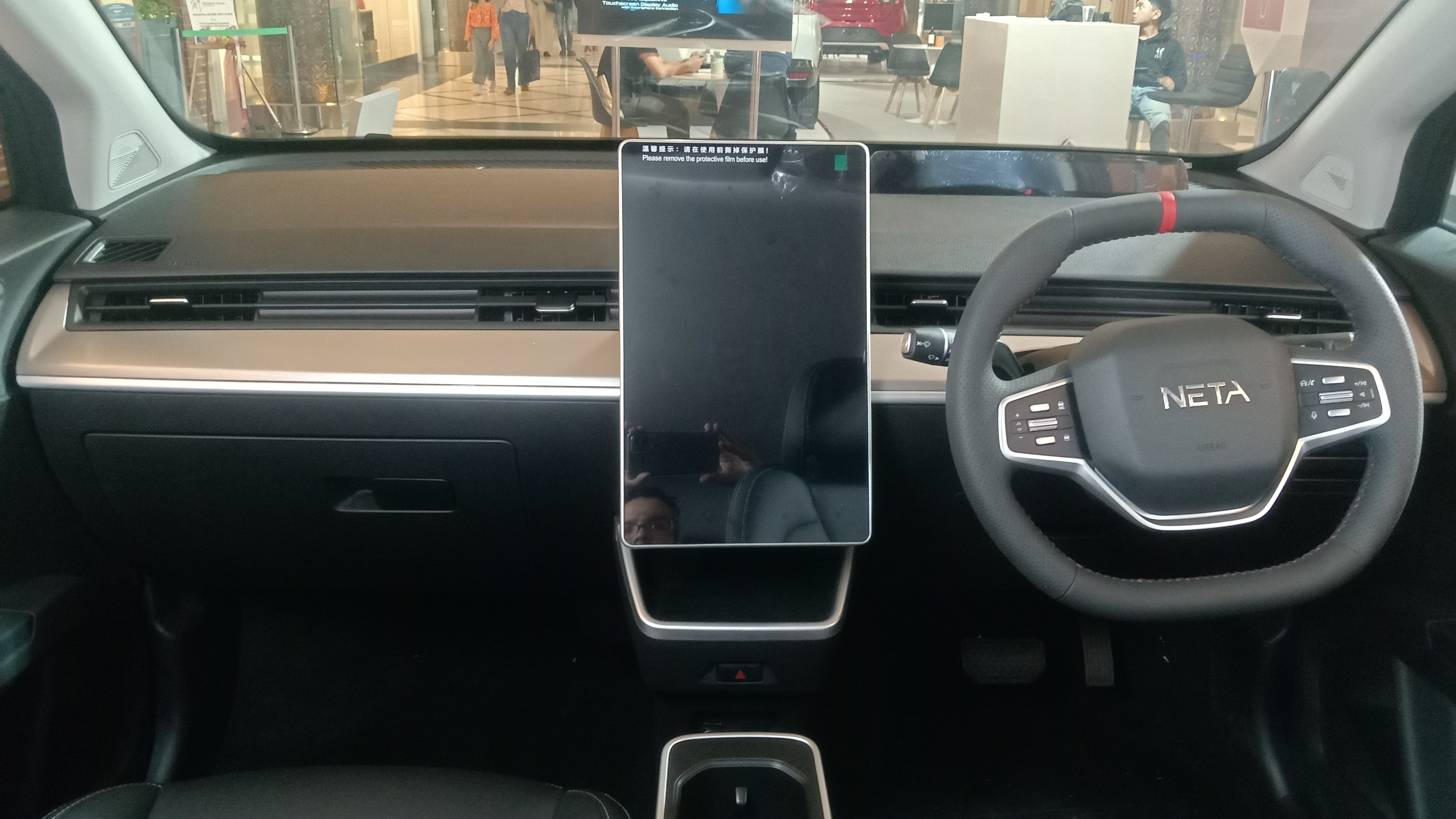
Interior

== Facelift (Neta V-II) ==
In August 2023, the updated model of the Neta V with upgraded exterior and interior was launched. The vehicle was renamed as Neta Aya in China and several other markets, and as Neta V-II elsewhere. In China, four variants are available.

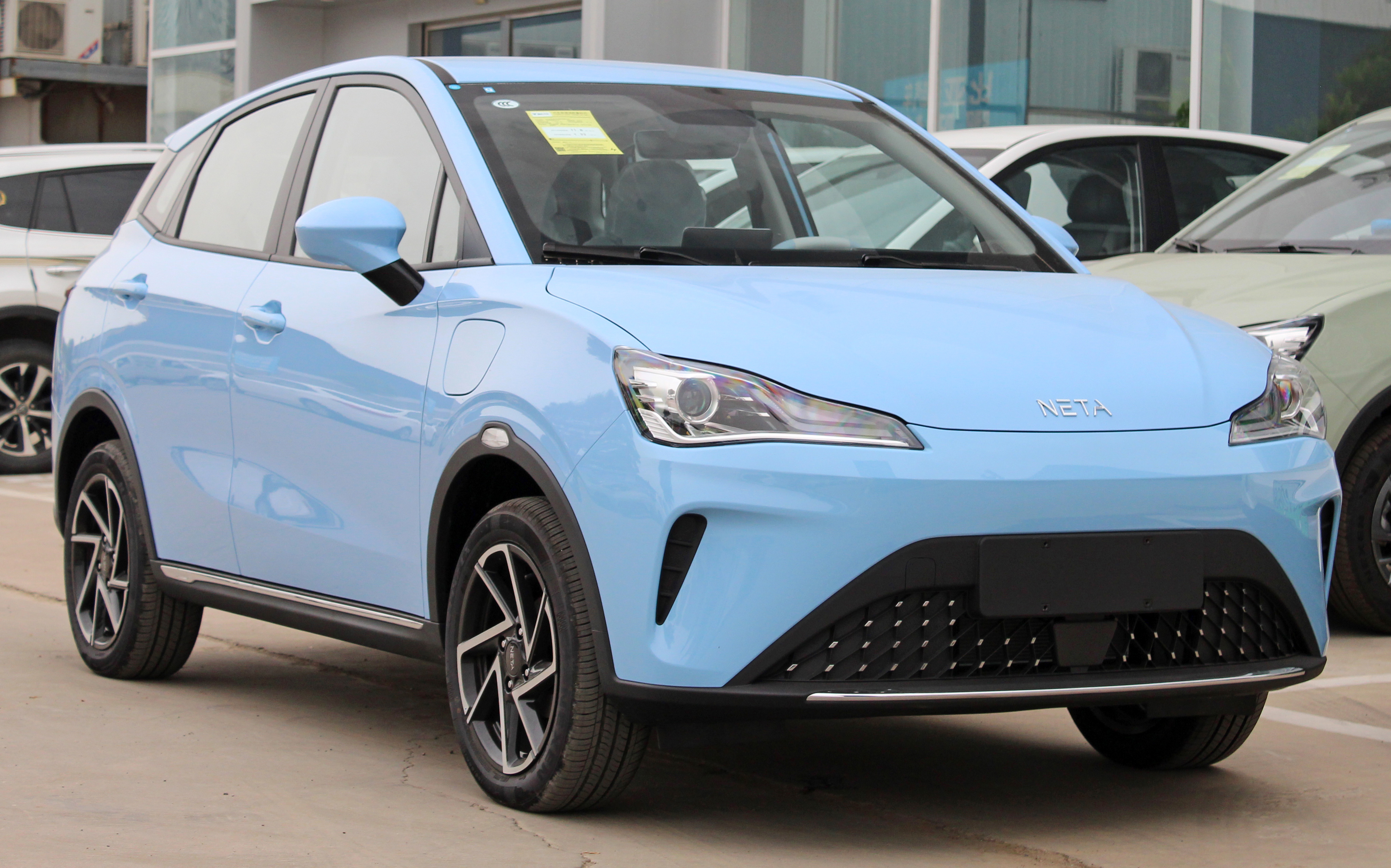
Neta Aya

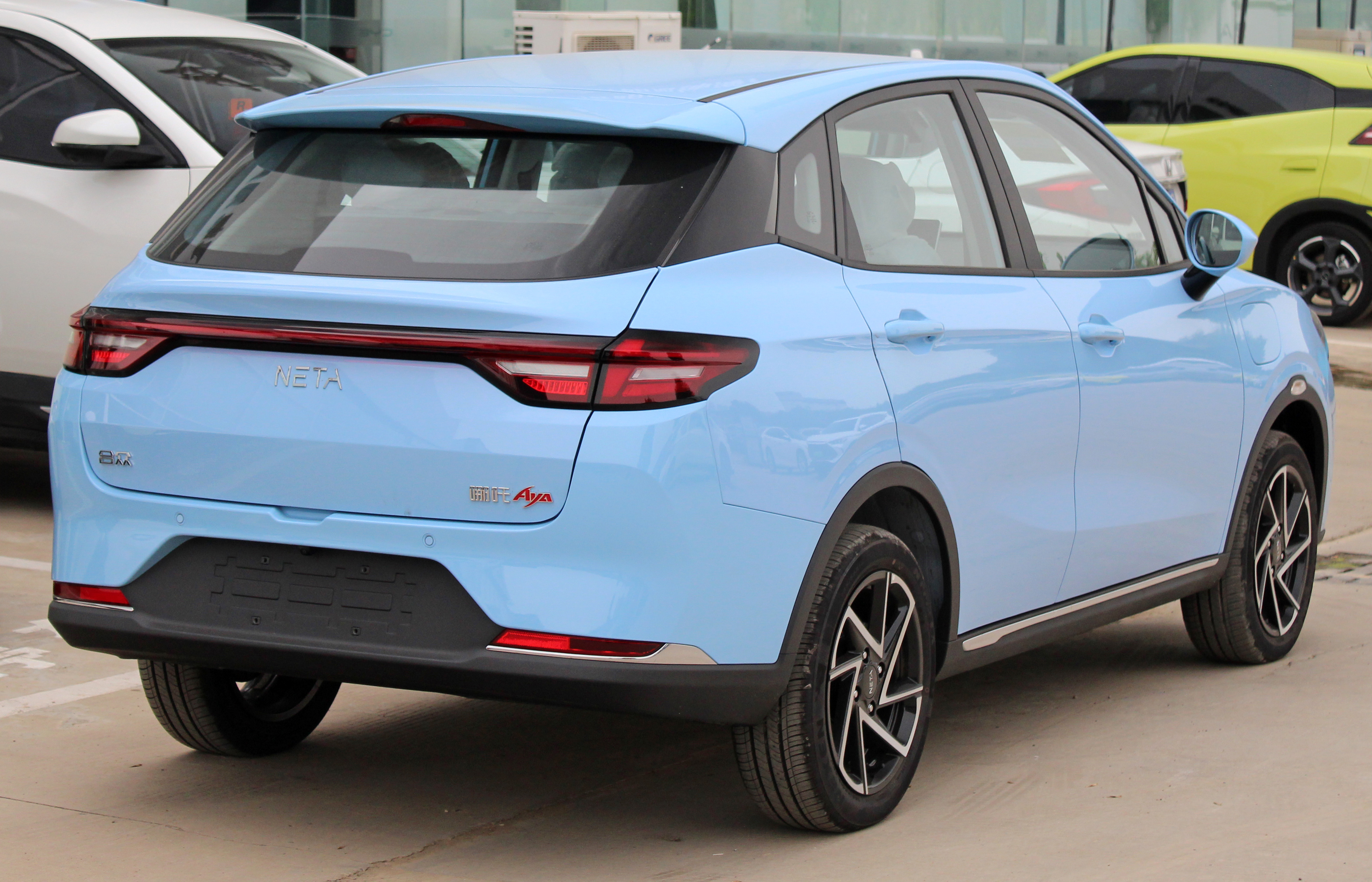
Rear view

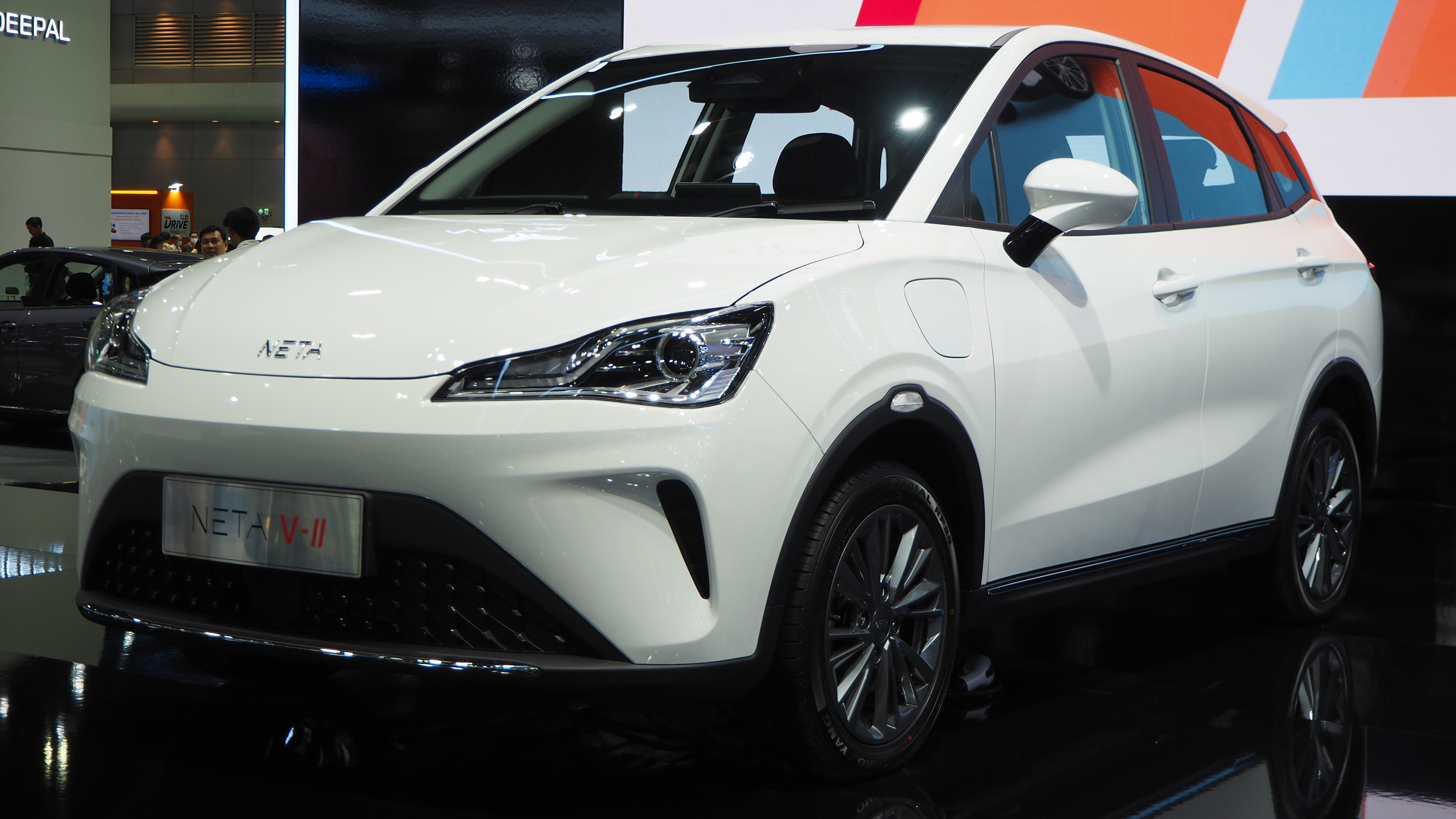
Neta V-II (Thailand)

== Markets ==
=== Indonesia ===
The V was introduced in Indonesia at the 30th Gaikindo Indonesia International Auto Show in August 2023, coinciding with Neta's entry to the Indonesian market. Pre-orders were opened at the time during the exhibition. Sales commenced on 24 October 2023. It is the first Neta model to be marketed in Indonesia. Imported from China, it is only available in one unnamed variant. As of May 2024, the V is sold in parallel alongside the facelifted V-II.

The facelifted V-II was introduced on 30 April 2024 at the 2024 Periklindo Electric Vehicle Show. Sales commenced on 22 May 2024. Unlike the pre-facelift V, the V-II is locally assembled at Handal Indonesia Motor's facility in Bekasi, West Java, where trial production was conducted on 22 April 2024, while mass production started on 31 May 2024 and continued until mid-2025.

=== Malaysia ===
The Neta V was introduced in Malaysia at the 2023 Malaysian Autoshow in May 2023, coinciding with Neta's debut to the Malaysian market as their first model. It was launched on 25 October 2023 in one unnamed variant, imported from China. Priced at RM100,000 at launch, it is one of the most affordable EVs in Malaysia, surpassed only by the less expensive (RM60,000 to 80,000) Proton e.MAS 5.

=== Singapore ===
The V was launched in Singapore on 15 January 2025 as the Aya, coinciding with Neta's entry to the Singaporean market. It is available in a sole unnamed variant using the 40.7 kWh battery.

=== Thailand ===
The V was launched in Thailand on 24 August 2022, as Neta's first model in the market. Imported from China, it is only available in one unnamed variant.

The facelifted V-II was launched in March 2024. Two trim levels were available for the V-II: Lite and Smart. Unlike the pre-facelift V, the V-II is locally assembled at Bangchan General Assembly's facility in Khan Na Yao District, Bangkok.

== Safety ==
ASEAN NCAP awarded the Neta V zero stars overall in December 2024, citing excessive intrusion of the steering wheel and A-pillar in the frontal offset crash test, missing seatbelt pretensioners and side head protection technologies, and poor fitment of pedestrian protection and motorcyclist safety technologies. Automotive news outlet InsideEVs noted the lack of "basic safety equipment" and described the Neta V as "one of the least safe new cars on sale in the world today." Due to the rating, Grab Malaysia banned all Neta vehicles from its e-hailing services.

ASEAN NCAP test results Neta V (2024)
Test	Points
Overall:	0 /5 stars
Adult occupant:	7.89
Child occupant:	13.51
Safety assist:	7.14
Motorcyclist Safety:	0.00

== Sales ==
Year	China	Indonesia	Malaysia	Thailand (Note: Figures based on registration (Thailand))
2020	3,033			
2021	49,646			
2022	71,158			71
2023	35,327	181	27	12,777
2024	2,638	512	230	6,587
2025	11	540	99	2,421
