= Ram Inthra Kor Mor 9 MRT station =

Train station in Bangkok, Thailand

Ram Inthra Kor Mor 9 รามอินทรา กม.9
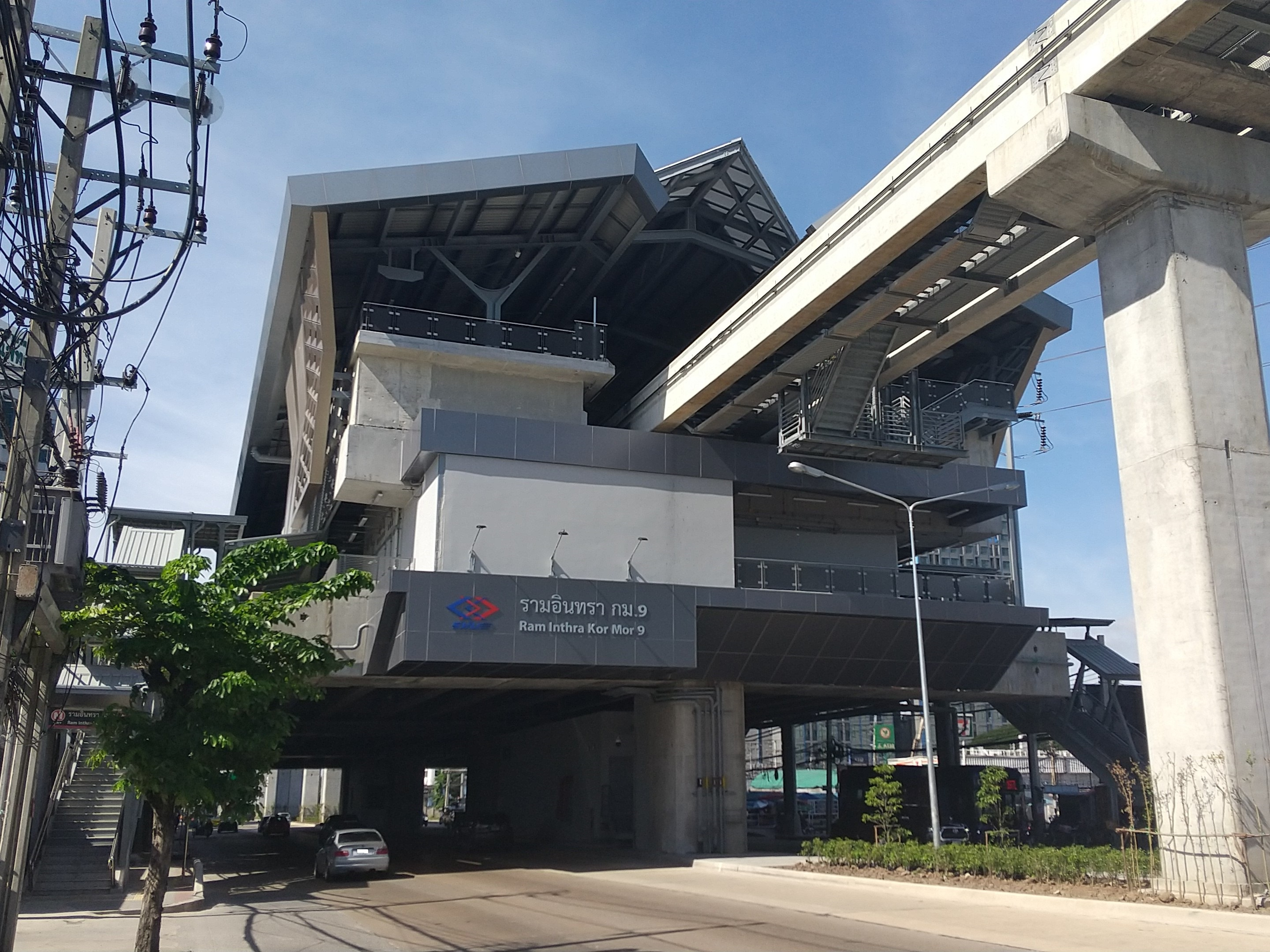

General information
- Location: Khan Na Yao District, Bangkok, Thailand
- System: MRT
- Owner: Mass Rapid Transit Authority of Thailand (MRTA)
- Operator: Northern Bangkok Monorail Company Limited
- Line: Pink Line

Other information
- Station code: PK24

History
- Opened: 21 November 2023

Services
Preceding station	Metropolitan Rapid Transit	Following station
Khu Bon towards Nonthaburi Civic Center	Pink Line	Outer Ring Road - Ram Inthra towards Min Buri
Location

Ram Inthra Kor Mor 9 station (Thai: สถานีรามอินทรา กม.9) is a Bangkok MRT station on the Pink Line. The station is located on Ram Inthra Road, near Soi Ram Inthra 56 in Khan Na Yao district, Bangkok. The station has four exits and is named after its location, which is approximately 9 kilometers from the origin of Ram Inthra Road. It opened on 21 November 2023 as part of trial operations on the entire Pink Line.

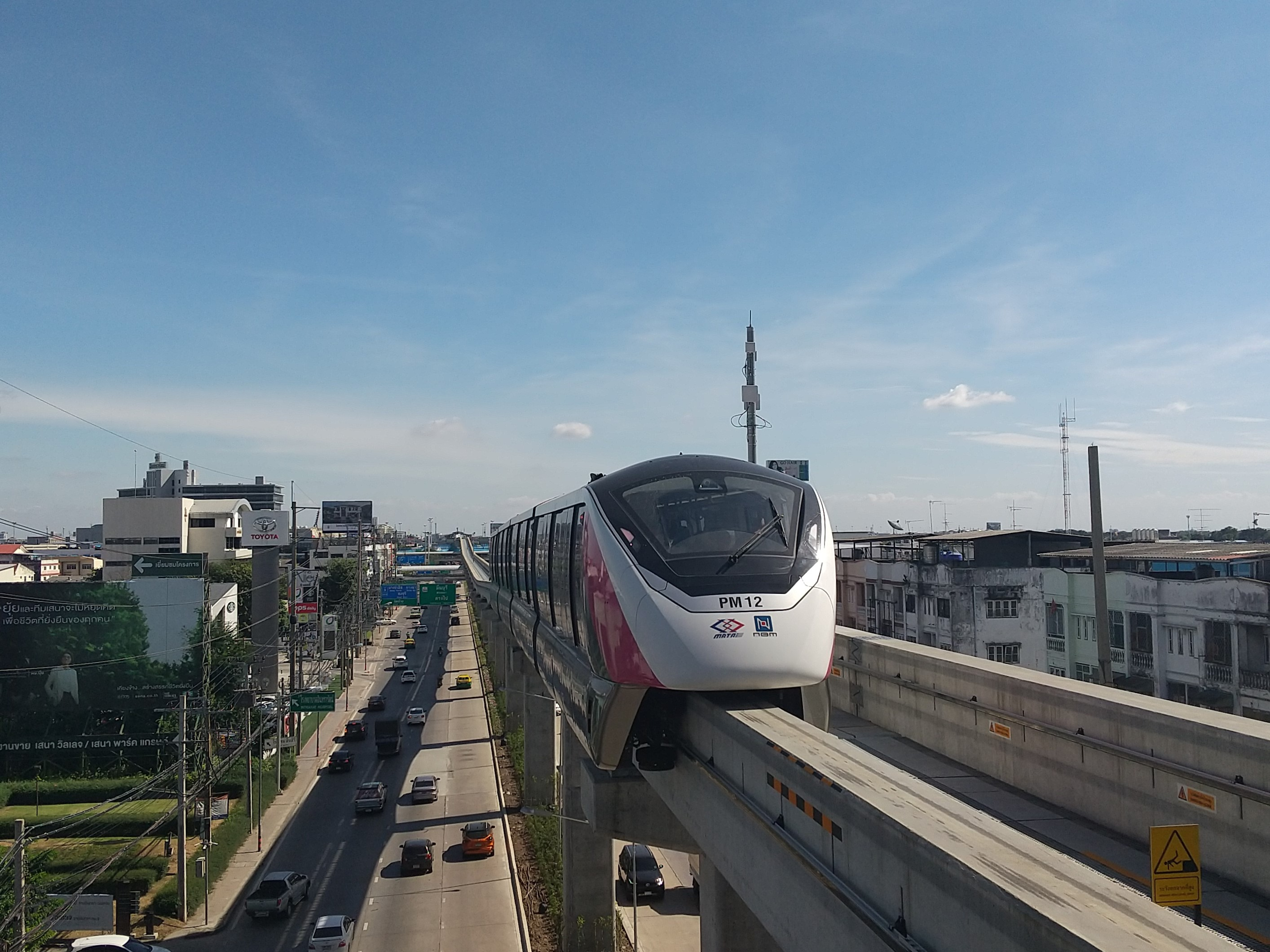
Monorail approaching station

The station's original English name was Ram Inthra KM.9 and was renamed on 6 September 2021 to Ram Inthra Kor Mor 9 to prevent misunderstanding when communicating between foreigners and locals. The subject was debated heavily online.
