= Outer Ring Road - Ram Inthra MRT station =

Train station in Bangkok, Thailand

Outer Ring Road - Ram Inthra วงแหวนรามอินทรา
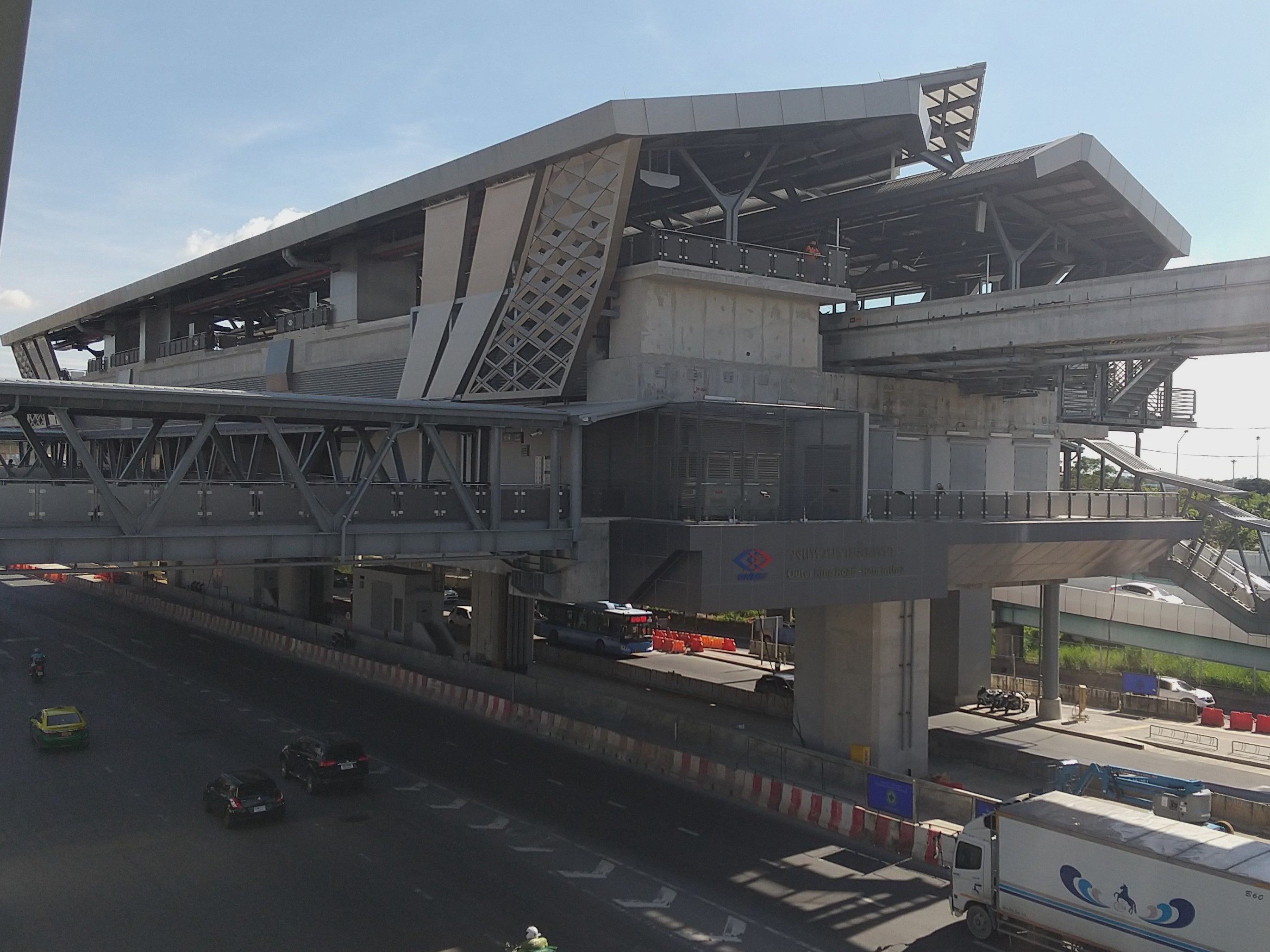

General information
- Location: Khan Na Yao District, Bangkok, Thailand
- System: MRT
- Owner: Mass Rapid Transit Authority of Thailand (MRTA)
- Operator: Northern Bangkok Monorail Company Limited
- Line: Pink Line

Other information
- Station code: PK25

History
- Opened: 21 November 2023

Services
| Preceding station | Metropolitan Rapid Transit | Following station |
|---|---|---|
| Ram Inthra Kor Mor 9 towards Nonthaburi Civic Center | Pink Line | Nopparat towards Min Buri |
Location

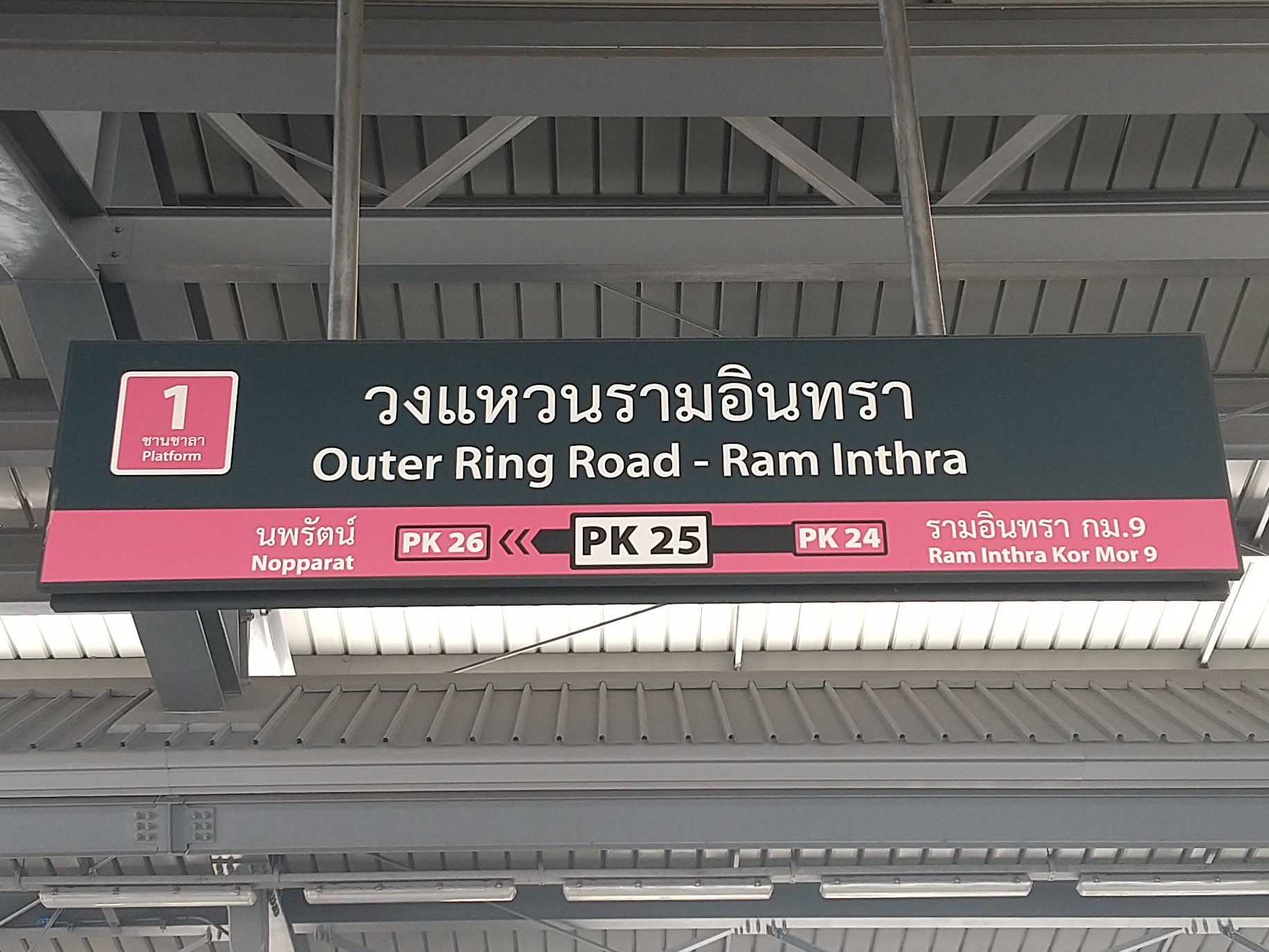
Signage

Outer Ring Road - Ram Inthra station (Thai: สถานีวงแหวนรามอินทรา, RTGS: Sathani Wong Waen Ram Inthra) is a Bangkok MRT station on the Pink Line. The station is located on Ram Inthra Road, near its intersection with Kanchanaphisek Road in Khan Na Yao district, Bangkok. The station has four exits and is located in close proximity to Fashion Island & The Promenade shopping malls. It opened on 21 November 2023 as part of trial operations on the entire Pink Line.
