= Min Buri Market MRT station =

Railway station in Bangkok, Thailand

Min Buri Market ตลาดมีนบุรี
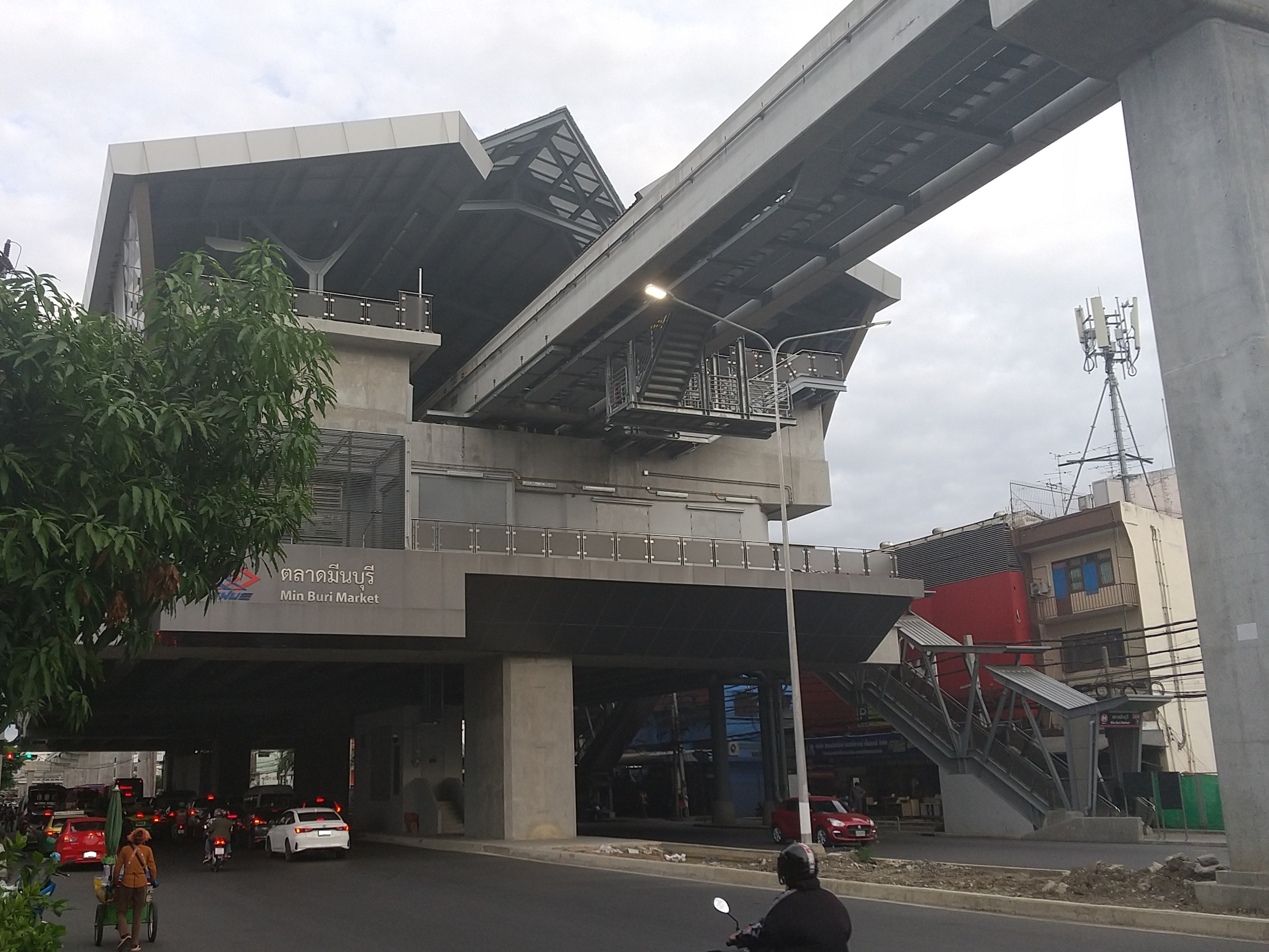

General information
- Location: Min Buri District, Bangkok, Thailand
- Coordinates: 13°48′45″N 100°43′32″E
- System: MRT
- Owner: Mass Rapid Transit Authority of Thailand (MRTA)
- Operator: Northern Bangkok Monorail Company Limited
- Line: Pink Line

Other information
- Station code: PK29

History
- Opened: 21 November 2023

Services
Preceding station	Metropolitan Rapid Transit	Following station
Setthabutbamphen towards Nonthaburi Civic Center	Pink Line	Min Buri Terminus
Location

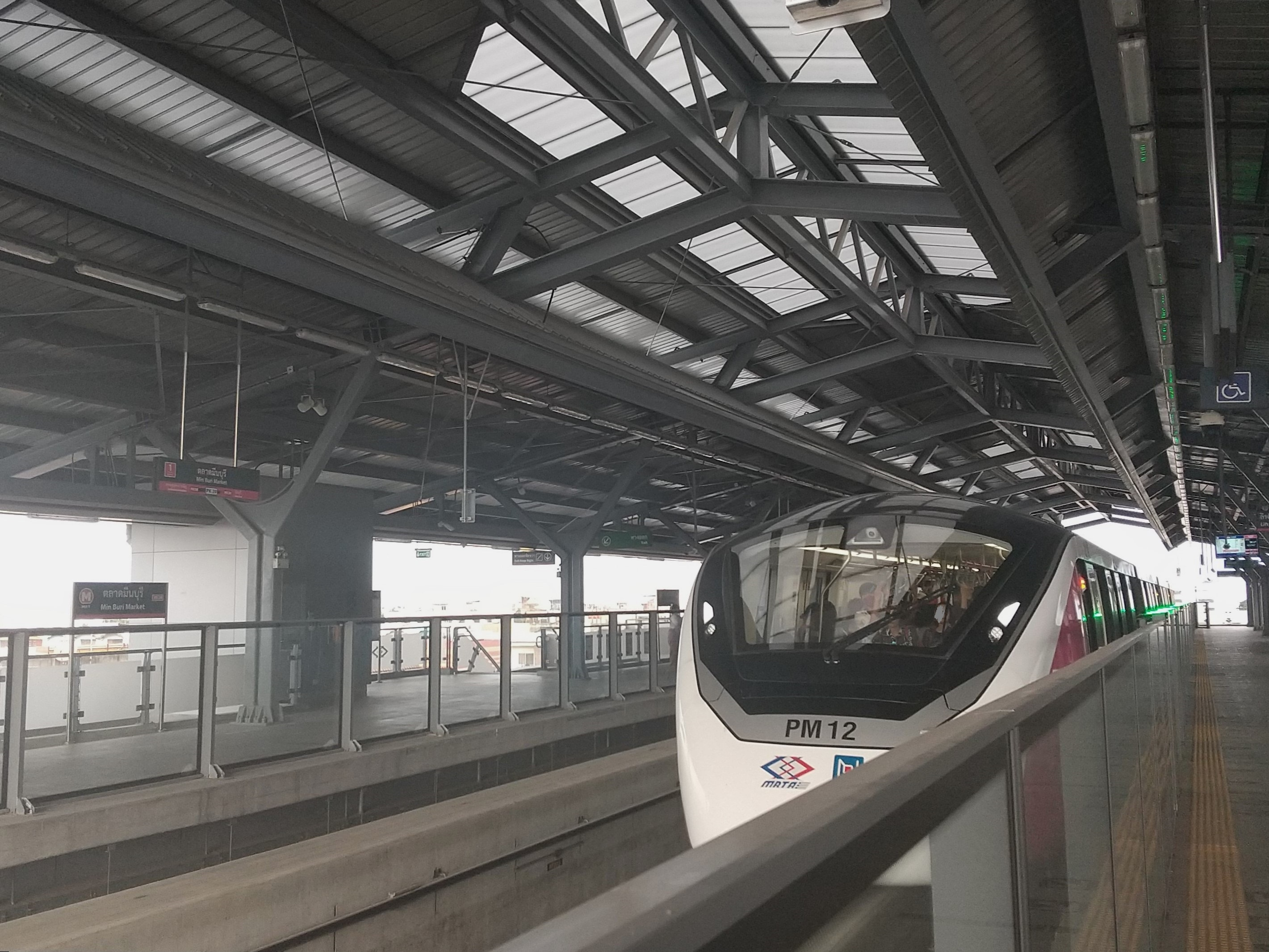
Platforms

Min Buri Market station (Thai: สถานีตลาดมีนบุรี, RTGS: Sathani Talat Min Buri) is a Bangkok MRT station on the Pink Line. The station is located on Sihaburanukit Road in Min Buri district, Bangkok. The station has four exits and serves Min Buri district office and Min Buri Market. It opened on 21 November 2023 as part of trial operations on the entire Pink Line.

Min Buri Market besides being a market, is also considered a transport centre of eastern Bangkok, the area beside the market is a minibus terminal that offers commuter minibuses and vans from Min Buri to various places around Bangkok and its metropolitan region, such as Victory Monument, Hua Takhe, Bang Phli, Nong Chok, Rangsit, Lam Luk Ka, etc.
