= Khan Na Yao subdistrict =

Khan Na Yao คันนายาว
- Khwaeng
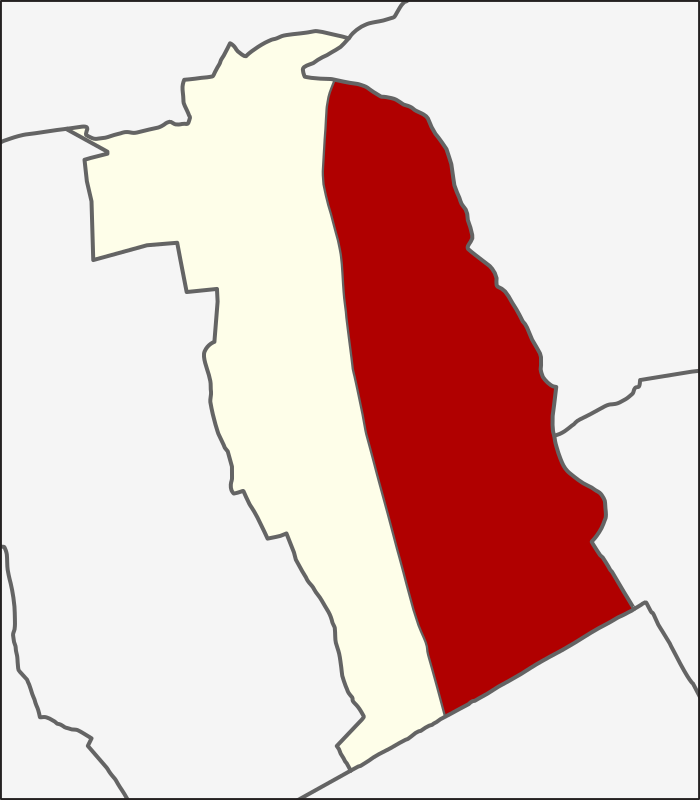
- Location in Khan Na Yao District
- Country: Thailand
- Province: Bangkok
- Khet: Khan Na Yao

Area
  - Total: 12.917 km^{2} (4.987 sq mi)

Population (2020)
  - Total: 47,313
- Time zone: UTC+7 (ICT)
- Postal code: 10230
- TIS 1099: 104301

Khan Na Yao (Thai: คันนายาว, pronounced [kʰān nāː jāːw]) is a khwaeng (subdistrict) of Khan Na Yao District, in Bangkok, Thailand. In 2020, it had a total population of 47,313 people.

In Khan Na Yao, there is a neighbourhood called "Lo Lae" (หลอแหล, pronounced [ɔː lɛː]). Originally, it was the name of a floating market on Khlong Saen Saep that flowed through the area. The floating market ceased around late 1990s. Its name is a corruption of the word "Ron Ram" (รอนแรม, pronounced [rɔːn rɛːm]), which means "wandering". Since Khan Na Yao was once considered quite far from the downtown, and because it was a waterside area, people traveling by boat would arrive here at dusk, so they had to spend the night here, hence the name. Currently, what known as Lo Lae is the area behind the Khan Na Yao School, and called the same canal that flows continuously to the adjacent districts in the south, Saphan Sung and Rat Phatthana.
