= Ram Inthra subdistrict =

Ram Inthra รามอินทรา
- Khwaeng
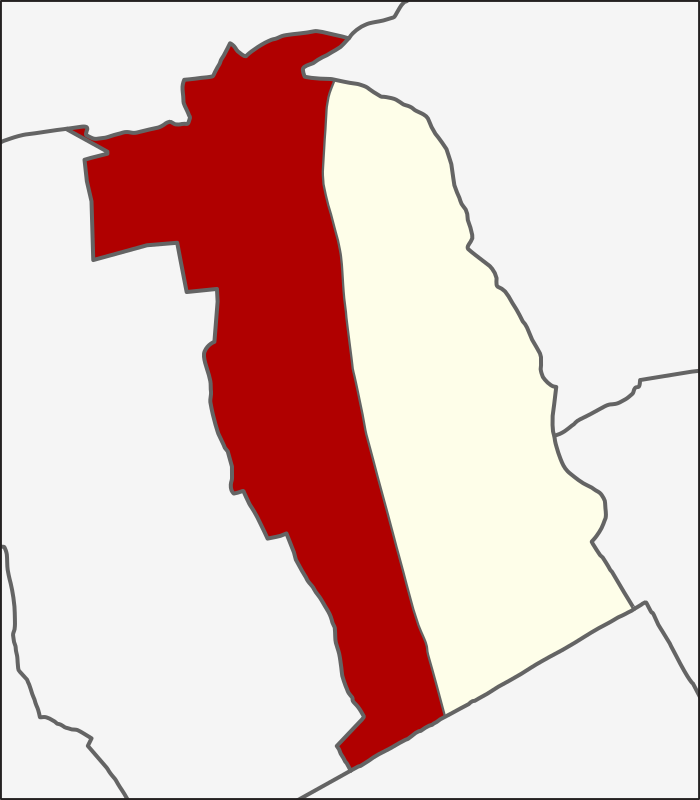
- Location in Khan Na Yao District
- Country: Thailand
- Province: Bangkok
- Khet: Khan Na Yao

Area
  - Total: 13.063 km^{2} (5.044 sq mi)

Population (2020)
  - Total: 49,017
- Time zone: UTC+7 (ICT)
- Postal code: 10230
- TIS 1099: 104302

Ram Inthra (Thai: รามอินทรา, pronounced [rāːm ʔīn.tʰrāː]) is a khwaeng (subdistrict) of Khan Na Yao District, in Bangkok, Thailand. Named after Ram Inthra Road, the subdistrict was created in 2009. In 2020, it had a total population of 49,017 people.
