= Bangchan General Assembly =

Bangchan General Assembly Co., Ltd.
- Type: Subsidiary
- Founded: 1970; 56 years ago
- Headquarters: Khan Na Yao District, Bangkok, Thailand
- Products: Automobiles, engines

Bangchan General Assembly Co., Ltd. is an automobile assembly based in the Khan Na Yao District, in Bangkok, Thailand. The plant is a subsidiary of the Phra Nakorn Automobile Company.

== History ==
Bangchan General Assembly was founded in 1970 as a Thai-American joint venture with General Motors. Against the background of corresponding political requirements, the assembly of passenger cars from CKD kits began in 1979.

The plant changed hands several times:

- 1979 Isuzu Motors (Thailand) Co., Ltd.
- 1987 Honda Cars (Thailand) Co., Ltd.
- since 2005 Phra Nakorn Automobile Group

No vehicle production was reported for 2005.

== Brands ==
Since its inception, BGAC has assembled models from 14 or 15 different brands. They include, Daihatsu, Opel, Holden and Honda. Daihatsu production ended in 1998. Commercial vehicles of the brands Foton and Tata (since 2017) are also assembled. Since 2017, BGAC has been operating together with Mercedes-Benz (Thailand) Ltd. a delivery center for new vehicles.

Production of Neta electric vehicles is scheduled to start in 2023.
