= Min Buri MRT station =

Railway station in Bangkok, Thailand

Min Buri มีนบุรี
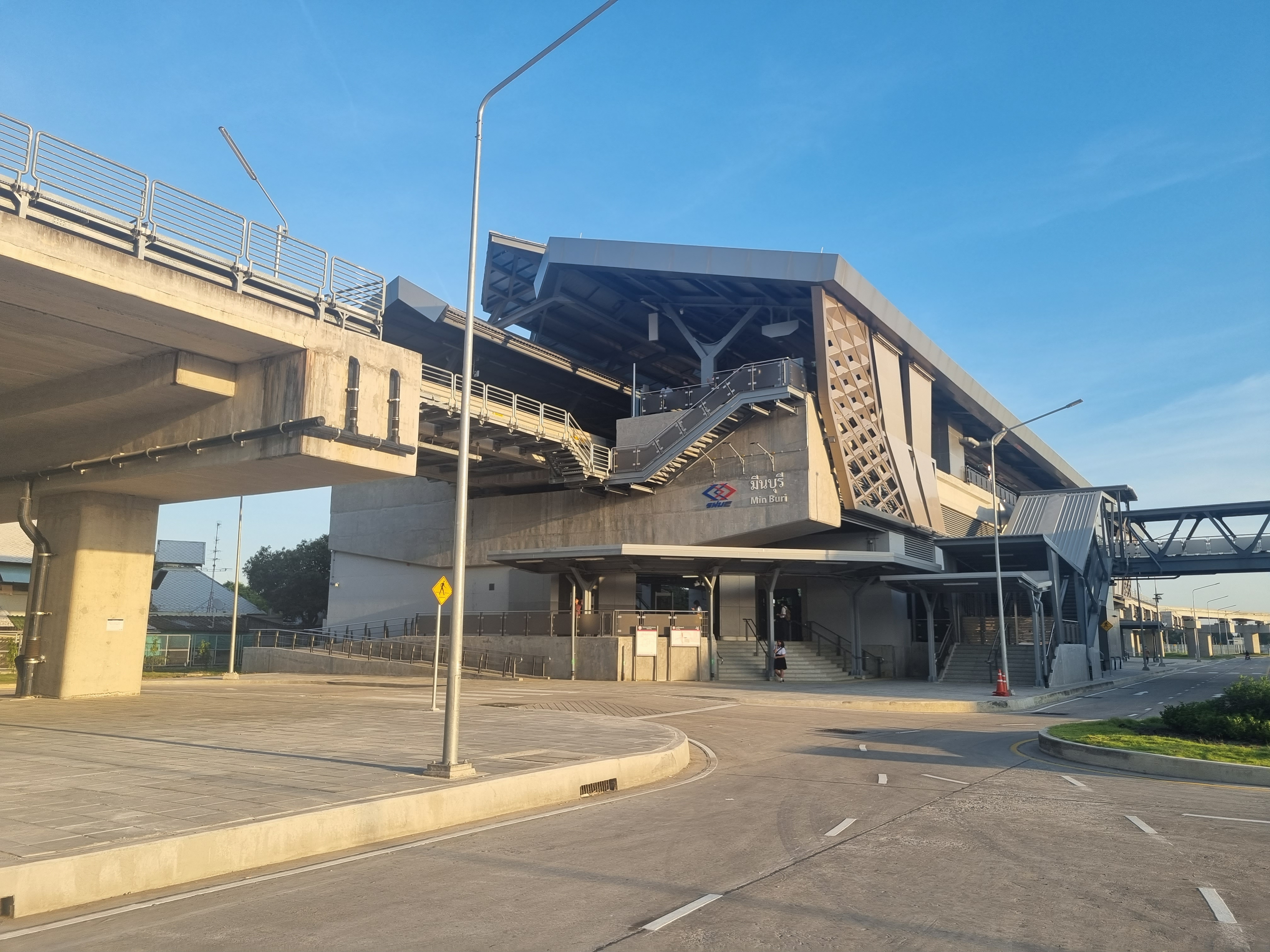
- Pink Line station

General information
- Location: Min Buri District, Bangkok, Thailand
- Coordinates: 13°48′31″N 100°43′58″E
- System: MRT MRT
- Owner: Mass Rapid Transit Authority of Thailand (MRTA)
- Operator: Northern Bangkok Monorail Company Limited
- Line: Pink Line MRT MRT Orange Line

Other information
- Station code: PK30; OR28

History
- Opened: 21 November 2023

Services
Preceding station	Metropolitan Rapid Transit	Following station
Min Buri Market towards Nonthaburi Civic Center	Pink Line	Terminus
Under construction
Kheha Ramkhamhaeng towards Taling Chan	Orange Line	Yaek Rom Klao Terminus
Location

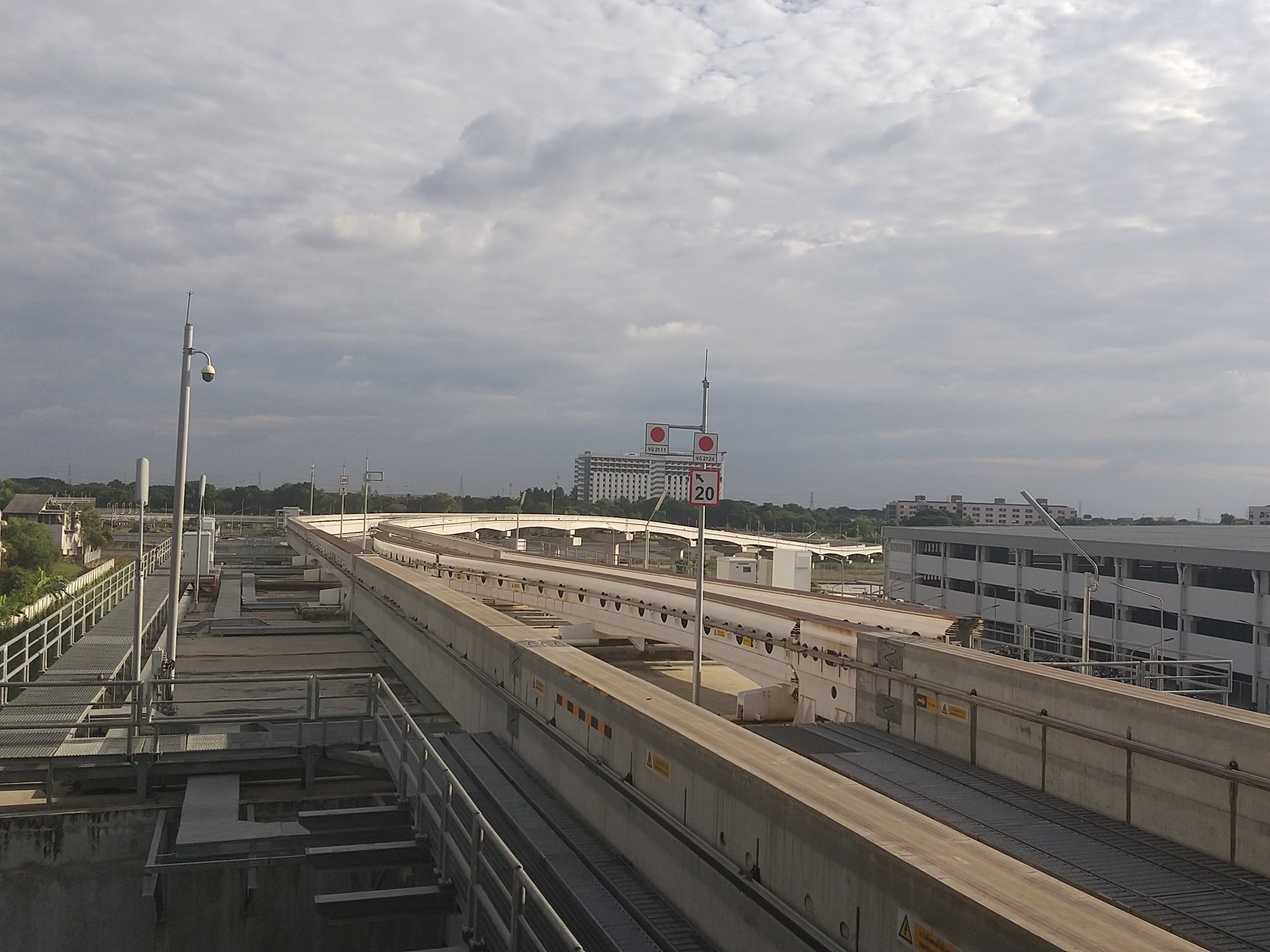
Tracks leading to the depot, with park and ride facility on the right

Min Buri station (Thai: สถานีมีนบุรี) is a Bangkok MRT station on the Pink Line. The station is located on Soi Ramkhamhaeng 190/4, adjacent to Ramkhamhaeng Road in Min Buri district, Bangkok. The station has four exits, has a park and ride facility and is also the location of the Pink Line Depot. The station opened on 21 November 2023 as part of trial operations on the entire Pink Line. In the future it will be an interchange station for the Orange Line once it opens.

During the 2025 Myanmar earthquake on 28 March, a section of its power line was dislocated in Min Buri district of Bangkok, forcing the line to suspend operations. The line was reopened on April 1, with only Min Buri station remaining closed. A shuttle bus provided by BMTA was deployed between Min Buri Market Station and Min Buri Station. Min Buri station resumed service on 16 April 2025.

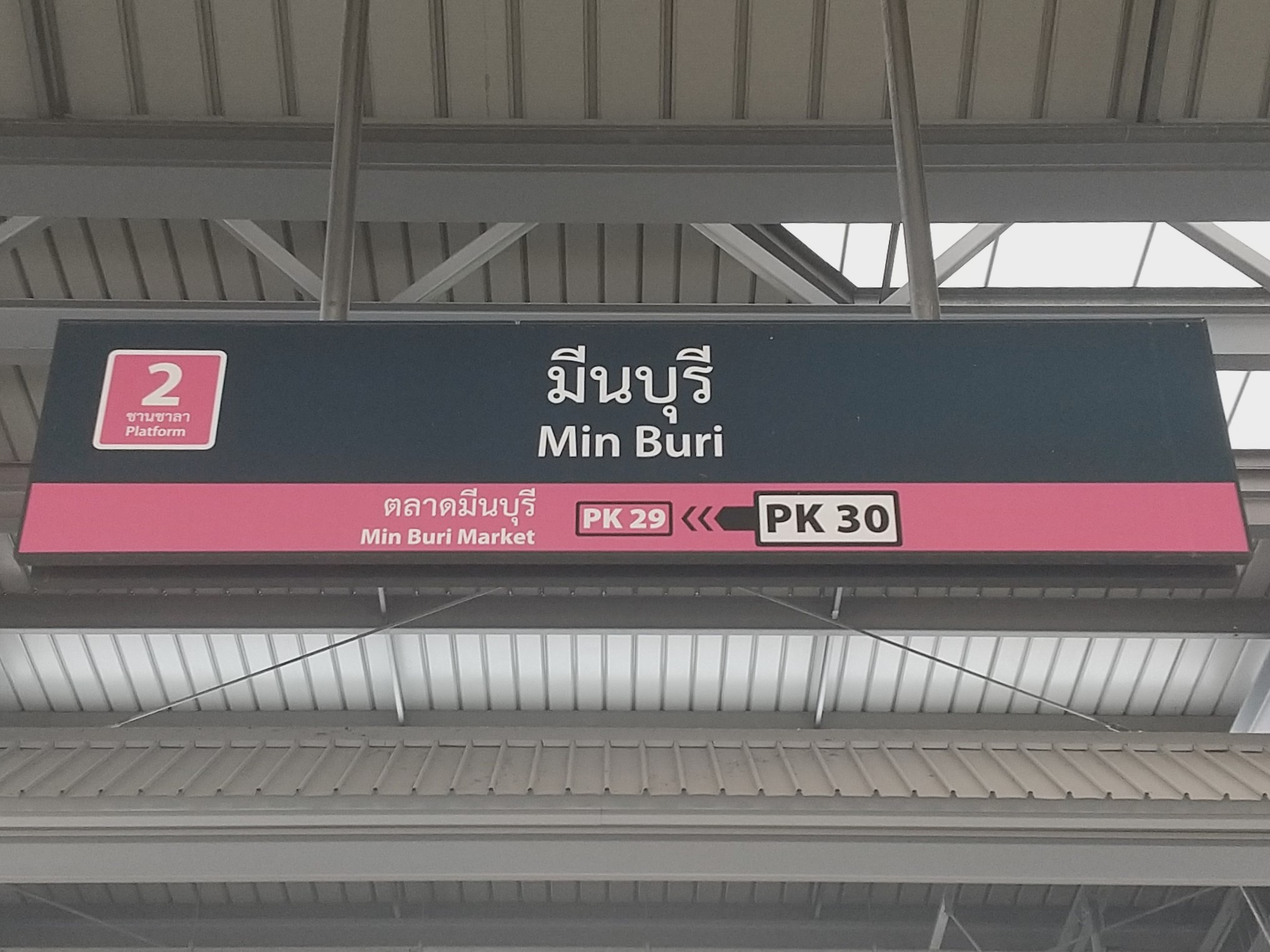
Pink Line station signage

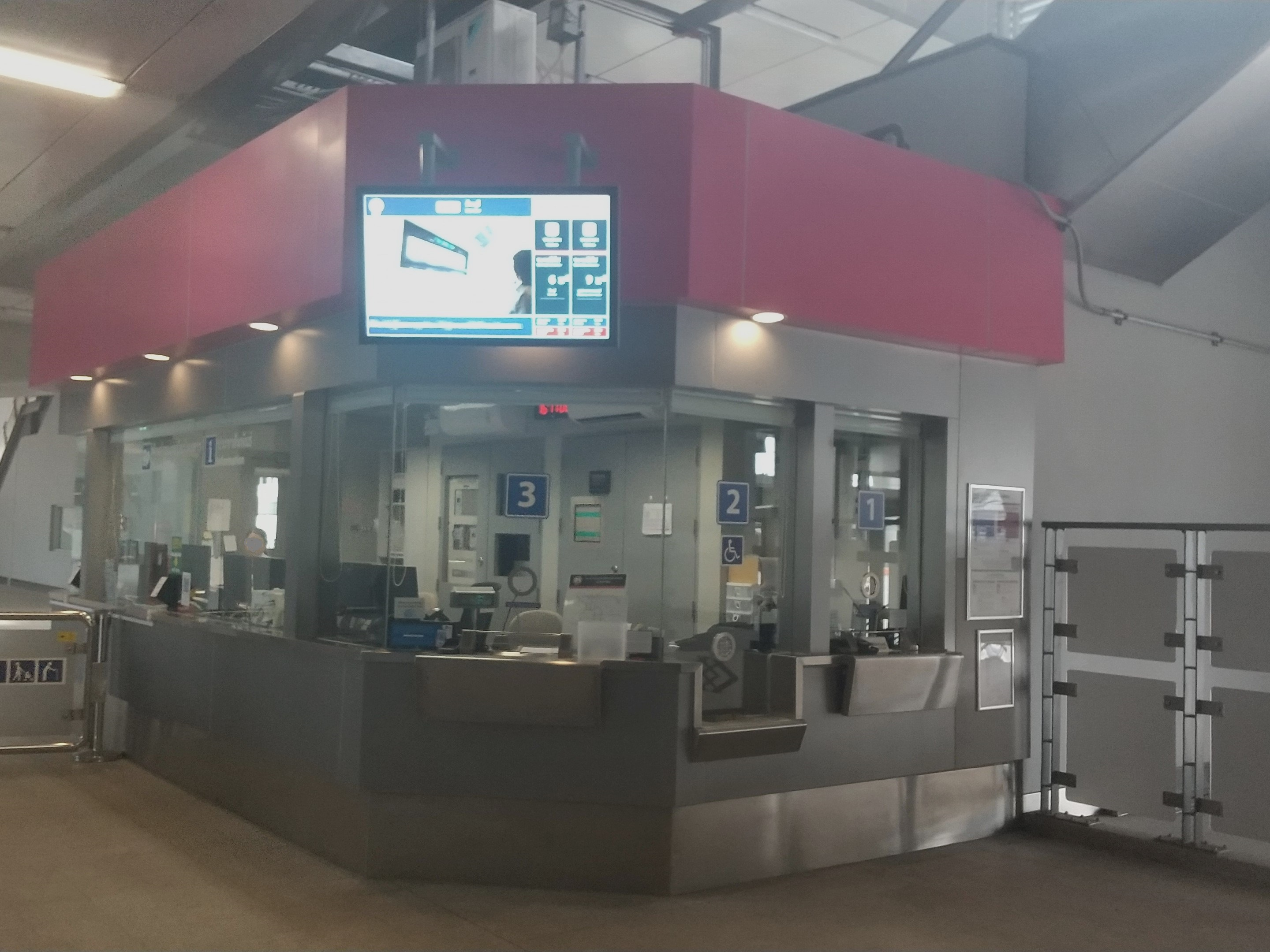
Ticket office

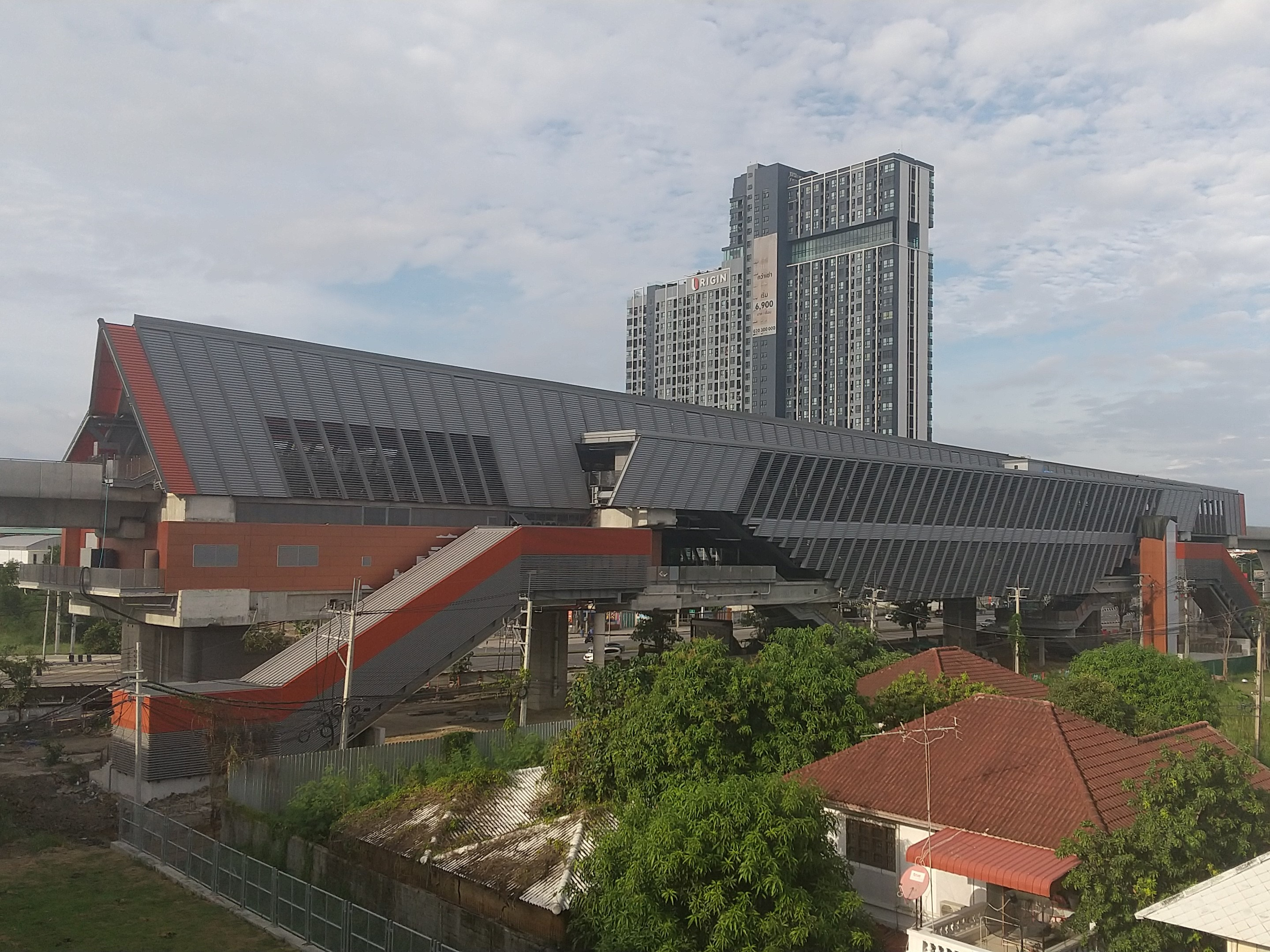
Orange Line Station
