= Khan Na Yao district =

Khan Na Yao คันนายาว
- Khet
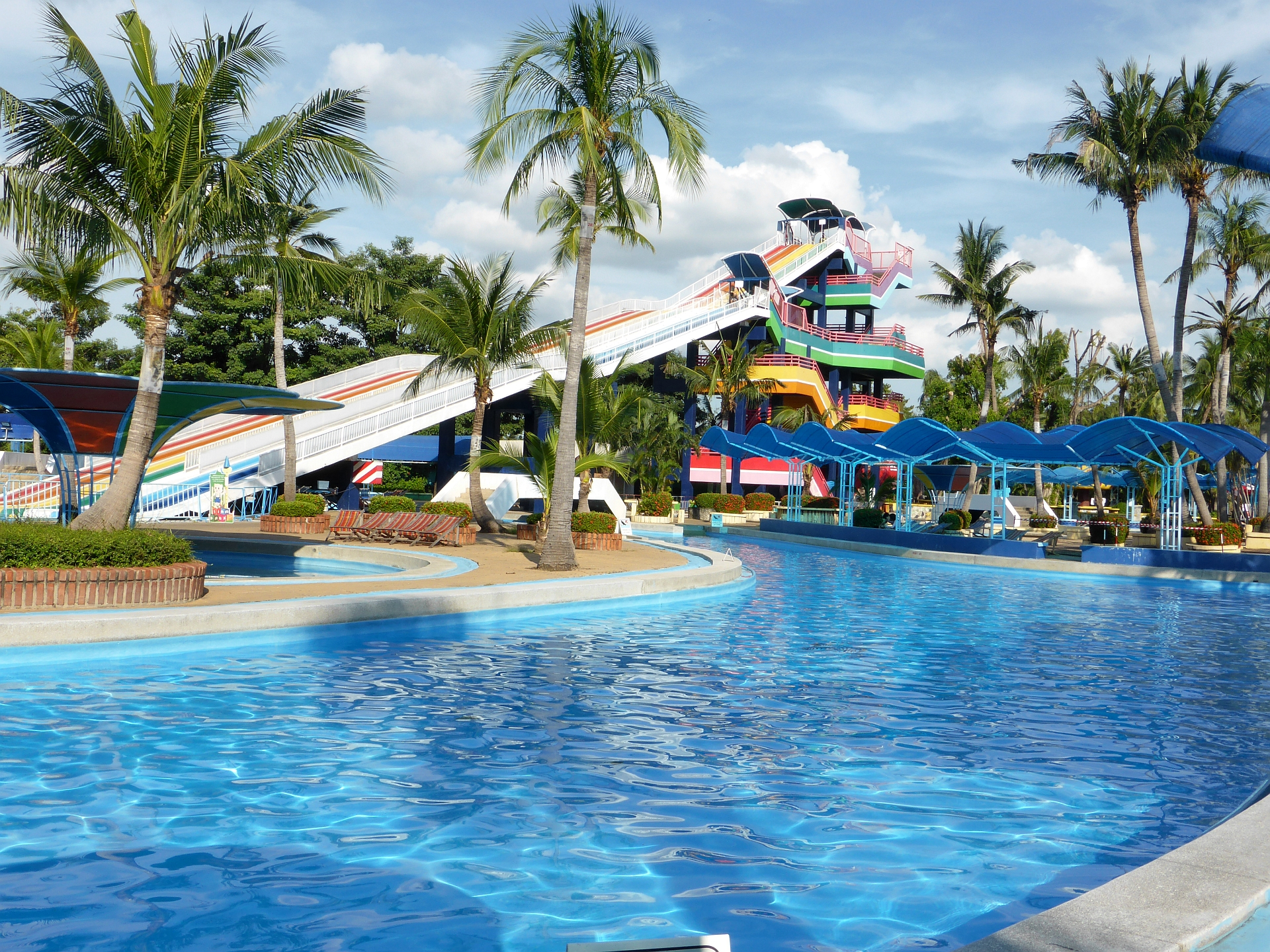
- Slider and swimming pool of Siam Park City

- Khet location in Bangkok
- Country: Thailand
- Province: Bangkok
- Seat: Khan Na Yao
- Khwaeng: 2
- Khet established: 21 November 1997

Area
  - Total: 25.980 km^{2} (10.031 sq mi)

Population (2017)
  - Total: 96,751
  - Density: 3,724.05/km^{2} (9,645.2/sq mi)
- Time zone: UTC+7 (ICT)
- Postal code: 10230
- Geocode: 1043

Khan Na Yao (Thai: คันนายาว, pronounced [kʰān nāː jāːw]) is one of the 50 districts (khet) of Bangkok, Thailand. It is bounded by other Bangkok districts (from north clockwise): Bang Khen, Khlong Sam Wa, Min Buri, Saphan Sung, and Bueng Kum. The district is most notable for Fashion Island & The Promenade shopping malls (served by Outer Ring Road - Ram Inthra MRT station on the Pink Line) and Siam Amazing Park amusement park.

== History ==
Khan Na Yao was separated from Bueng Kum on 14 October 1997 announcement, effective 21 November 1997, together with Saphan Sung.

Its name means "long paddy-field ridge", describing the geography of the district in the past; Khan Na Yao was an agricultural district. Until now, the rice fields and its ridges are long gone; they are part of the present-day Seri Thai road.

== Administration ==
The district is divided into two sub-districts (khwaeng).

No.	Name	Thai	Area (km^{2})	Map
1.	Khan Na Yao	คันนายาว	12.917	Map
2.	Ram Inthra	รามอินทรา	13.063	Map
Total			25.980	Map

== Places ==
- Wat Rat Sattha Tham
- Navatanee Golf Course
- Siam Amazing Park
- Fashion Island & The Promenade shopping malls
- Bangchan Industrial Estate

== District council ==
The District Council for Khan Na Yao has seven members, who each serve four-year terms. Elections were last held on 30 April 2006. The Thai Rak Thai Party won seven seats.
