= Thai art =

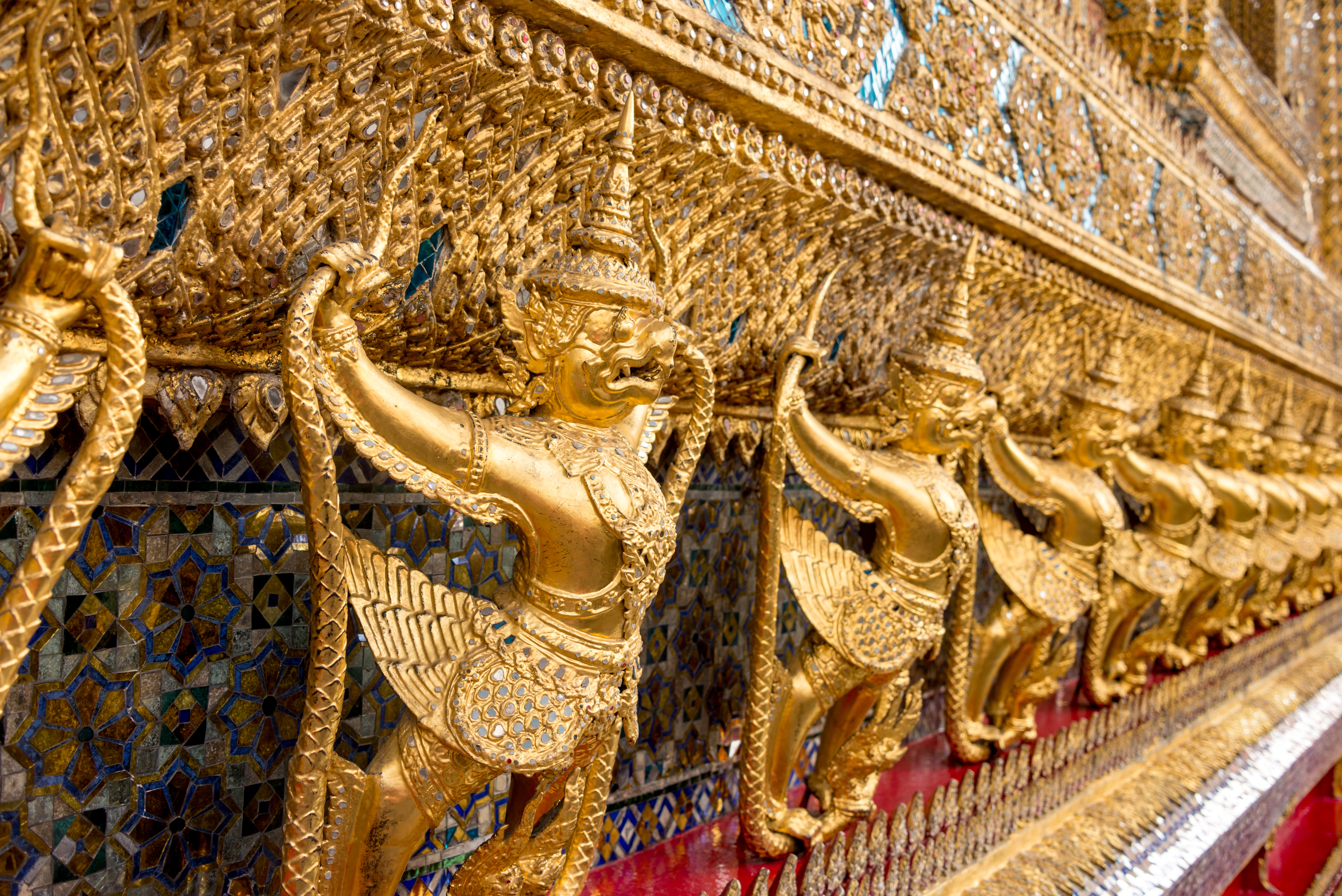
A row of gilded Garudas and Nāgas on the base of the Ubosot at Wat Phra Kaew.

Thai art refers to a diverse range of art forms created in Thailand from prehistoric times to the present day, including architecture, sculpture, painting, textiles, decorative arts, crafts, ceramics, and more. While Buddhism has played a significant role in Thai art, with many sculptures and paintings depicting Buddha images and religious themes, nature, including flora and fauna, as well as mythical creatures, has been a major inspiration for Thai art, with colorful motifs appearing in various types of art forms. In contemporary Thai art, traditional works remain significant and continue to influence artists' concepts.

== History ==
=== Prehistory ===
One of the earliest examples of artistic expression in Thailand can be found in over 410 documented rock art sites across the country, featuring both prehistoric and historic art. The majority of these sites showcase monochrome red pictograms that depict animals, humans, geometric shapes, and handprints. While the dating of many sites remains unknown, some rock art sites have been estimated to date back 3,000–5,000 years ago.

Nong Ratchawat, situated in Suphanburi province, is an important prehistoric site that provides valuable insights into the lifestyles of the people who settled in the area around 2000–500 BCE. Excavations have unearthed evidence of rice cultivation, animal husbandry, hunting, fishing, building construction, the creation of polished stone axes and pottery using locally available materials. The inhabitants were skilled in weaving textiles from plants possessing strong fibers, such as flax, hemp, and ramie. During the Iron Age, Nong Ratchawat became a prominent trading hub in the Mae Klong River Basin and the Tha Chin River Basin, attracting merchants from different parts of the world and leading to cultural and ethnic diversity. The river watersheds surrounding the site have yielded a plethora of artifacts, including pottery, bronze and iron tools, glass beads, ivory dice, Roman coins, and Lingling-o earrings. Ban Chiang is another important archaeological site in Thailand, located in Udon Thani province. It showcases the artistic achievements of a prehistoric culture that existed from about 2000 BCE to 300 CE. The people of Ban Chiang were skilled metalworkers, and evidence of early metallurgy, including copper and bronze artifacts, has been found at the site. The site also features diverse ceramics, some of which are decorated with distinctive red-on-buff swirl designs painted by hand.

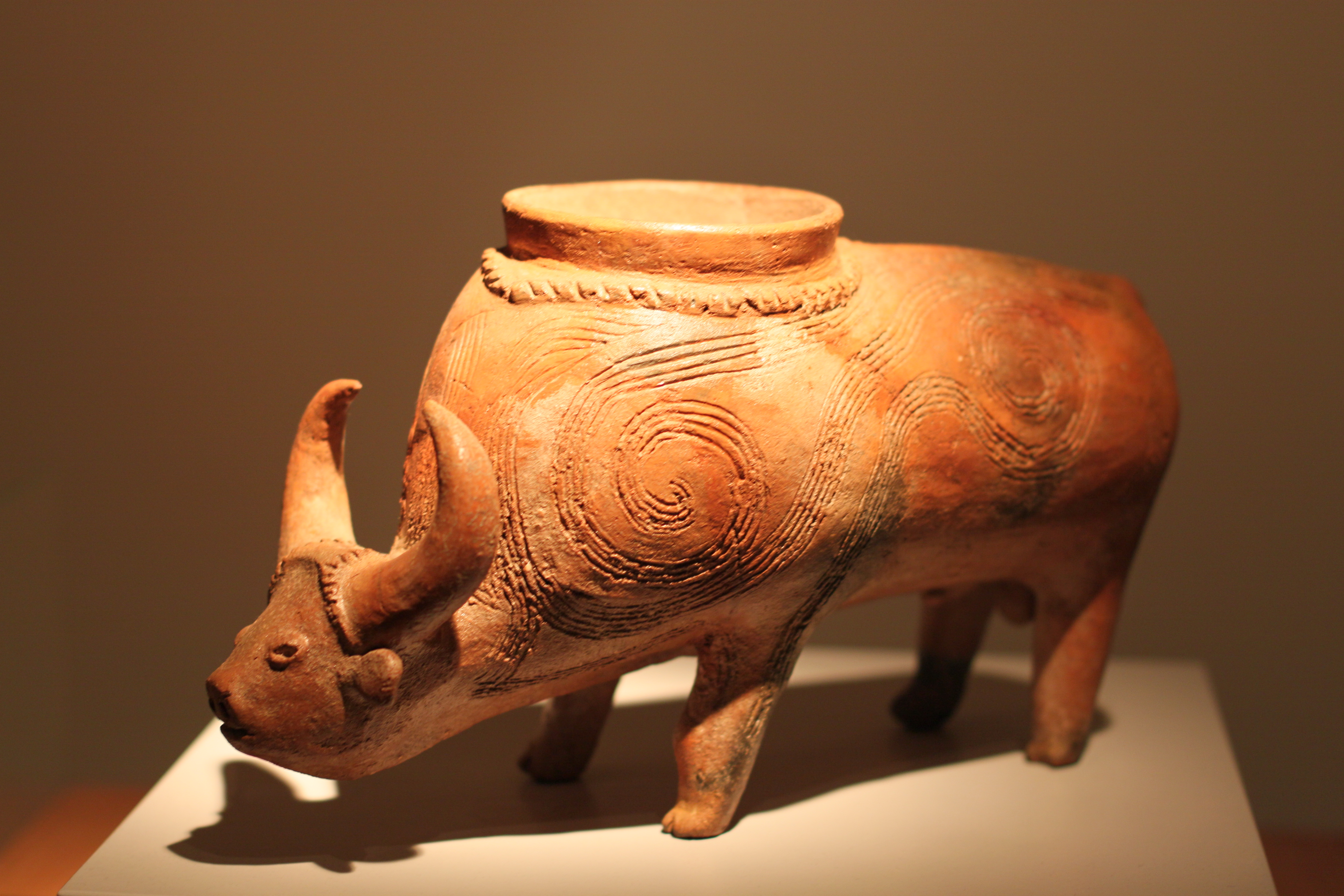
Vessel in the form of a water buffalo from Lopburi; 2300 BC; ceramic; height: 18 cm (7 3/32 in.)

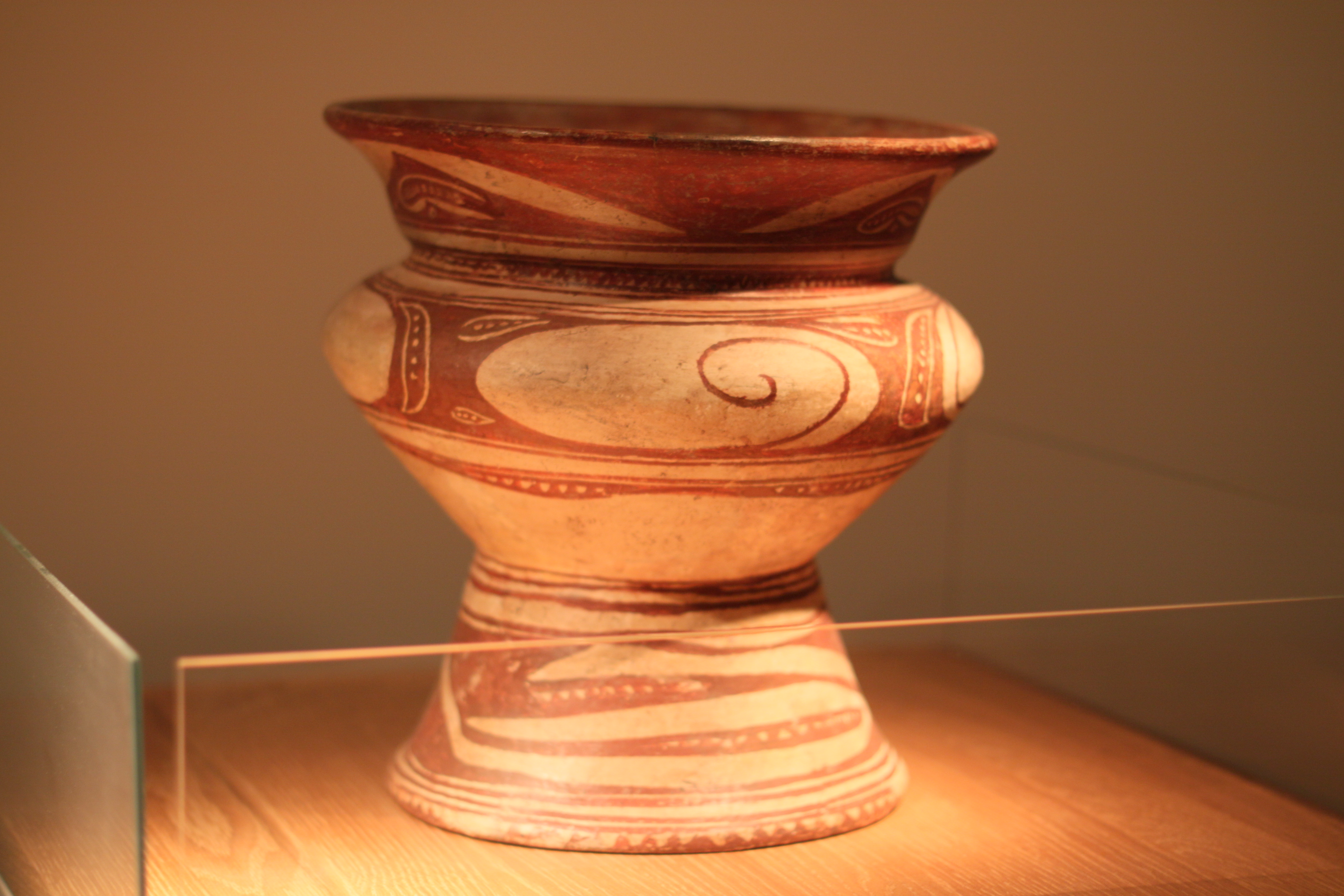
Bowl; from Ban Chiang site; painted ceramic; height: 32 cm, diameter: 31 cm

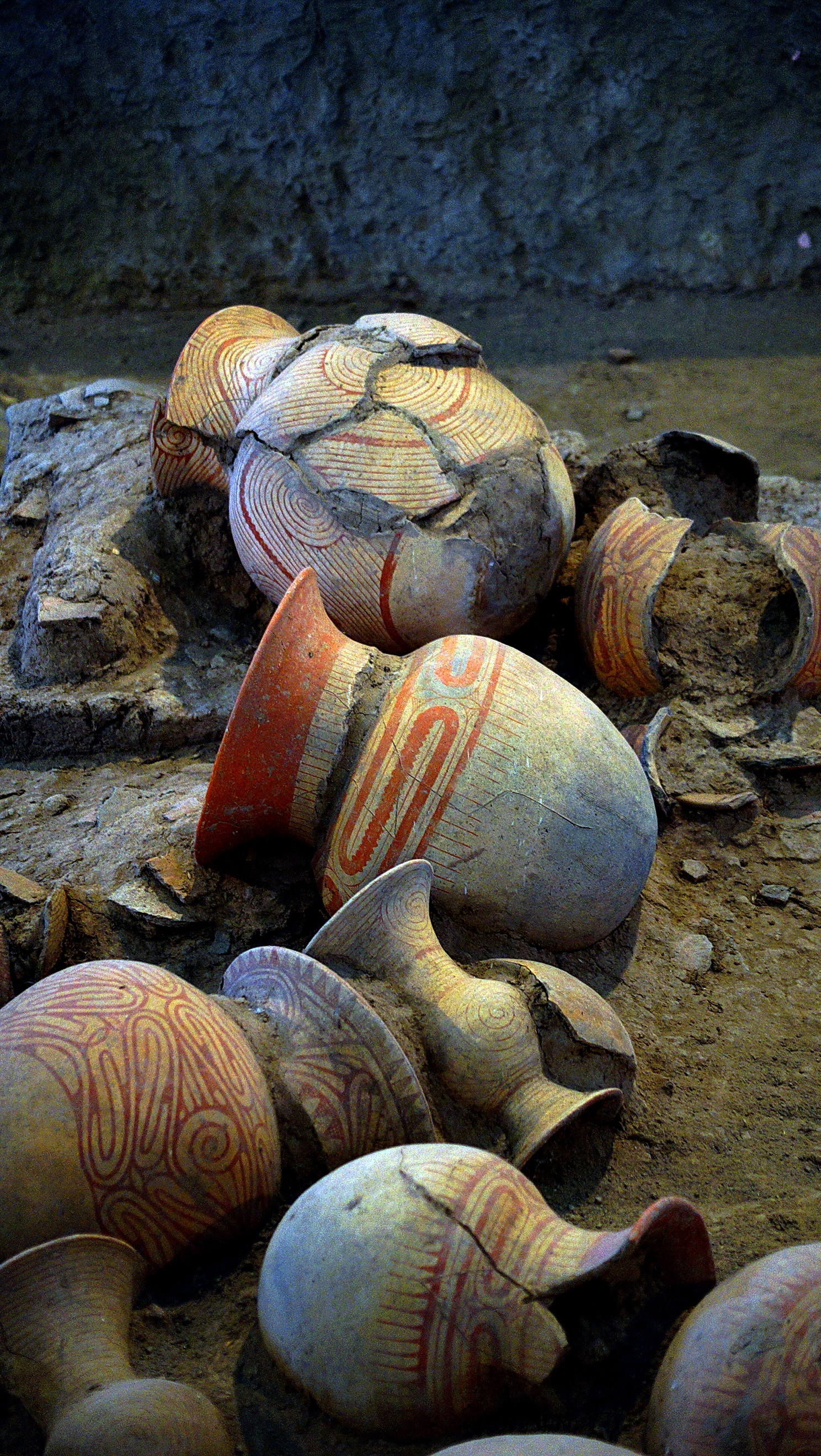
Painted pottery, Ban Chiang.

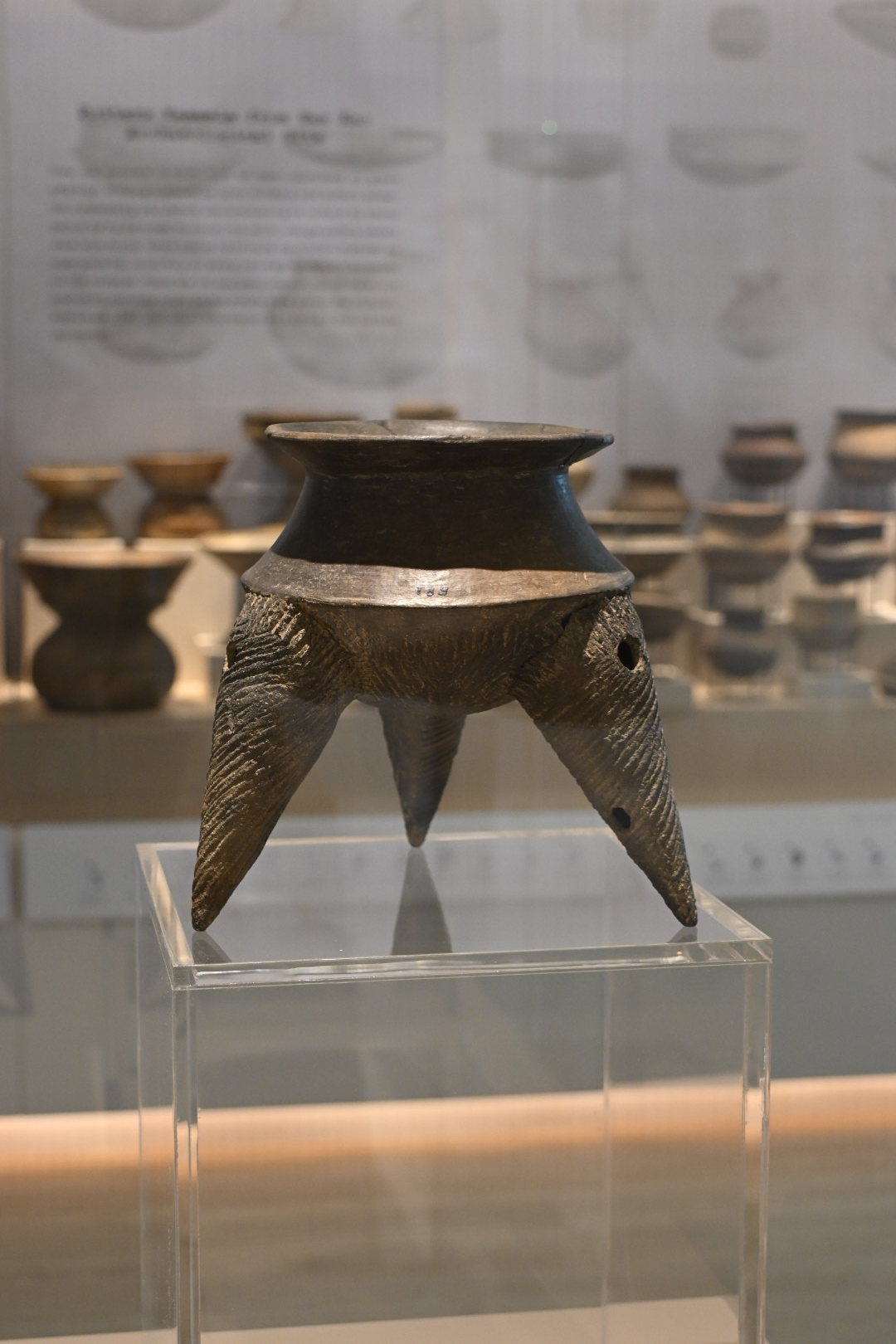
Tripod earthenware, Ca. 4,000 – 3,600 years ago, Ban Kao, Kanchanaburi province.

=== Dvaravati art ===
The Dvaravati period, lasting from the 6th to the 12th centuries CE, witnessed the spread of Theravada Buddhism throughout central, northern, northeastern, and southern Thailand. While Theravada Buddhism was the dominant religion during this time, there is also evidence of other religious influences, including Mahayana Buddhism and Hinduism. Dvaravati art, which employed hard blue limestone or quartzite to produce intricate sculptures, stucco, and terracotta decorations, featured symmetrical Buddha images standing or seated on thrones and the Wheel of the Law. The art style of Dvaravati owed its influence to the art of the Gupta and Post-Gupta periods in northern India, as well as the Buddhist art of Amaravati in southern India. People of Dvaravati were likely the Mons, as evidenced by various inscriptions during this period. The Dvaravati period played a significant role in the dissemination of Buddhism across the region, with noteworthy examples of Dvaravati towns including Nakhon Pathom ancient city in Nakhon Pathom province, U-Thong in Suphanburi province, Chan Sen in Nakhon Sawan province, Si Thep in Phetchabun province, Hariphunchai in Lamphun province, Mueang Fa Daet Song Yang in Kalasin province, Champasi in Maha Sarakham province, Sema in Nakhon Ratchasima province, Baan Dong Lakorn in Nakhon Nayok province, Ku Bua in Ratchaburi province, and Yarang in Pattani province.

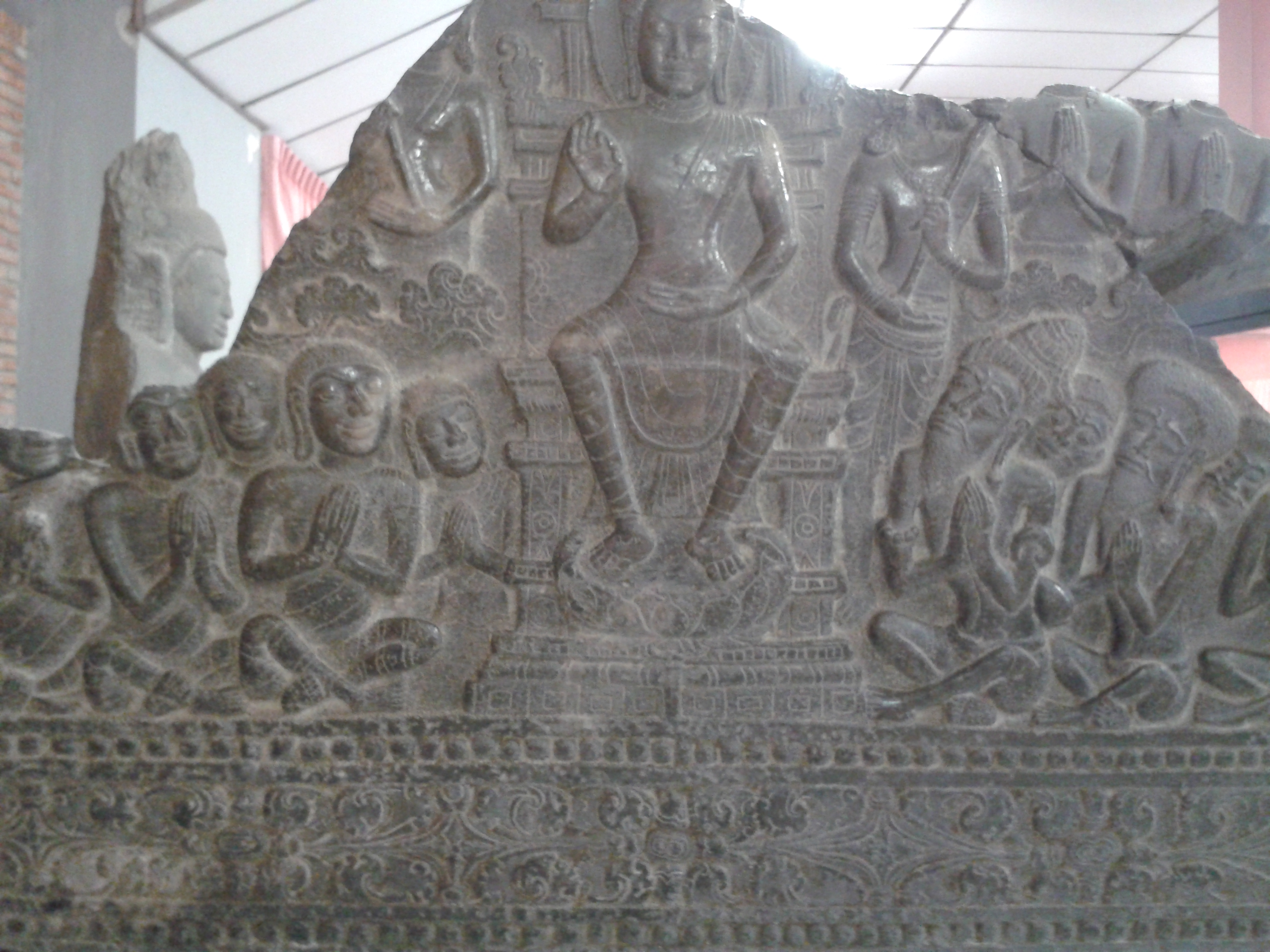
Dvaravati period stone buddha, Phra Pathom Chedi National Museum.

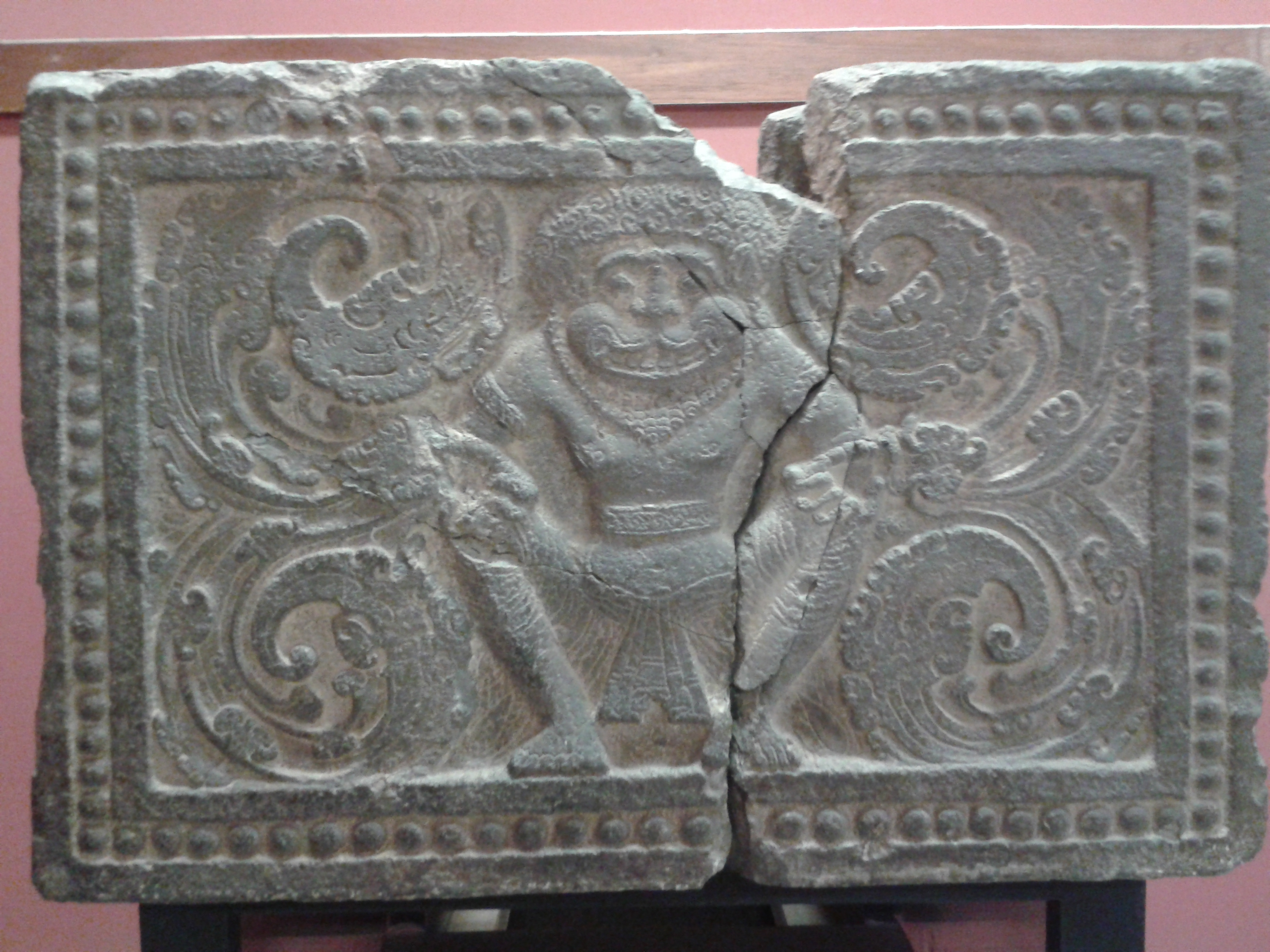
Dvaravati period stone sculpture, Phra Pathom Chedi National Museum.

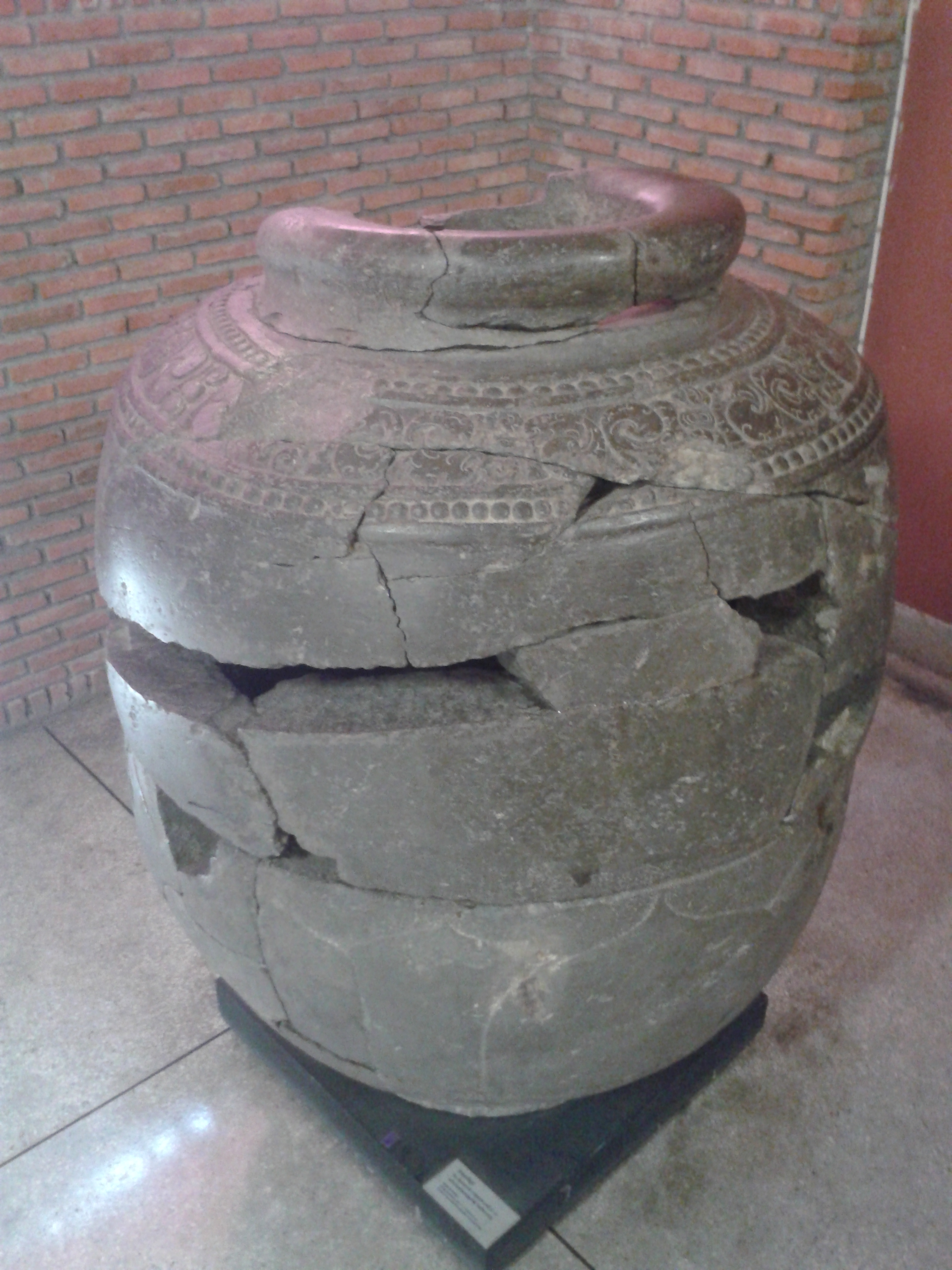
Dvaravati period stone jar, Phra Pathom Chedi National Museum.

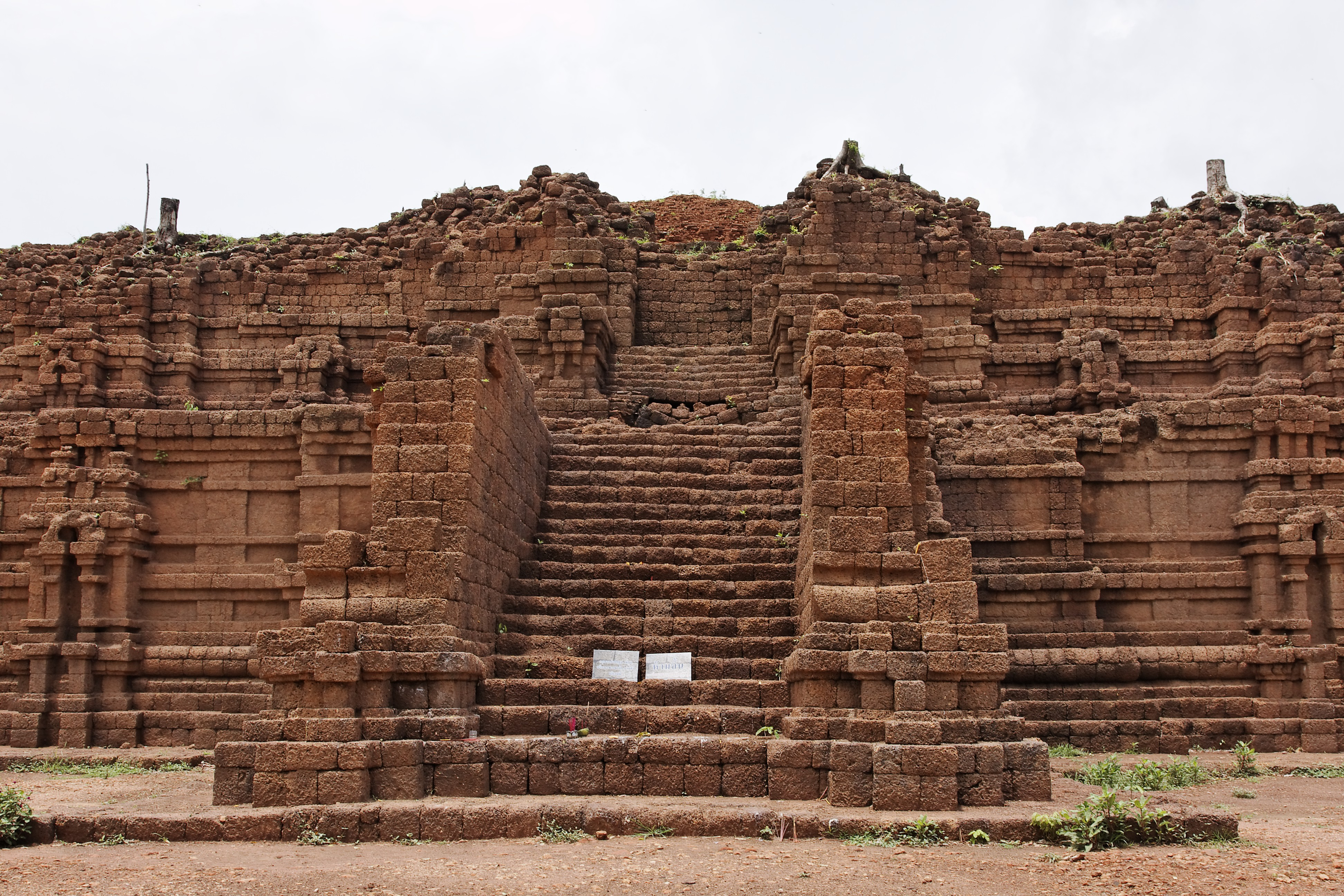
An ancient Dvaravati-style stupa dating back to the 8th-9th century CE in Si Thep. It now stands as a large laterite base.

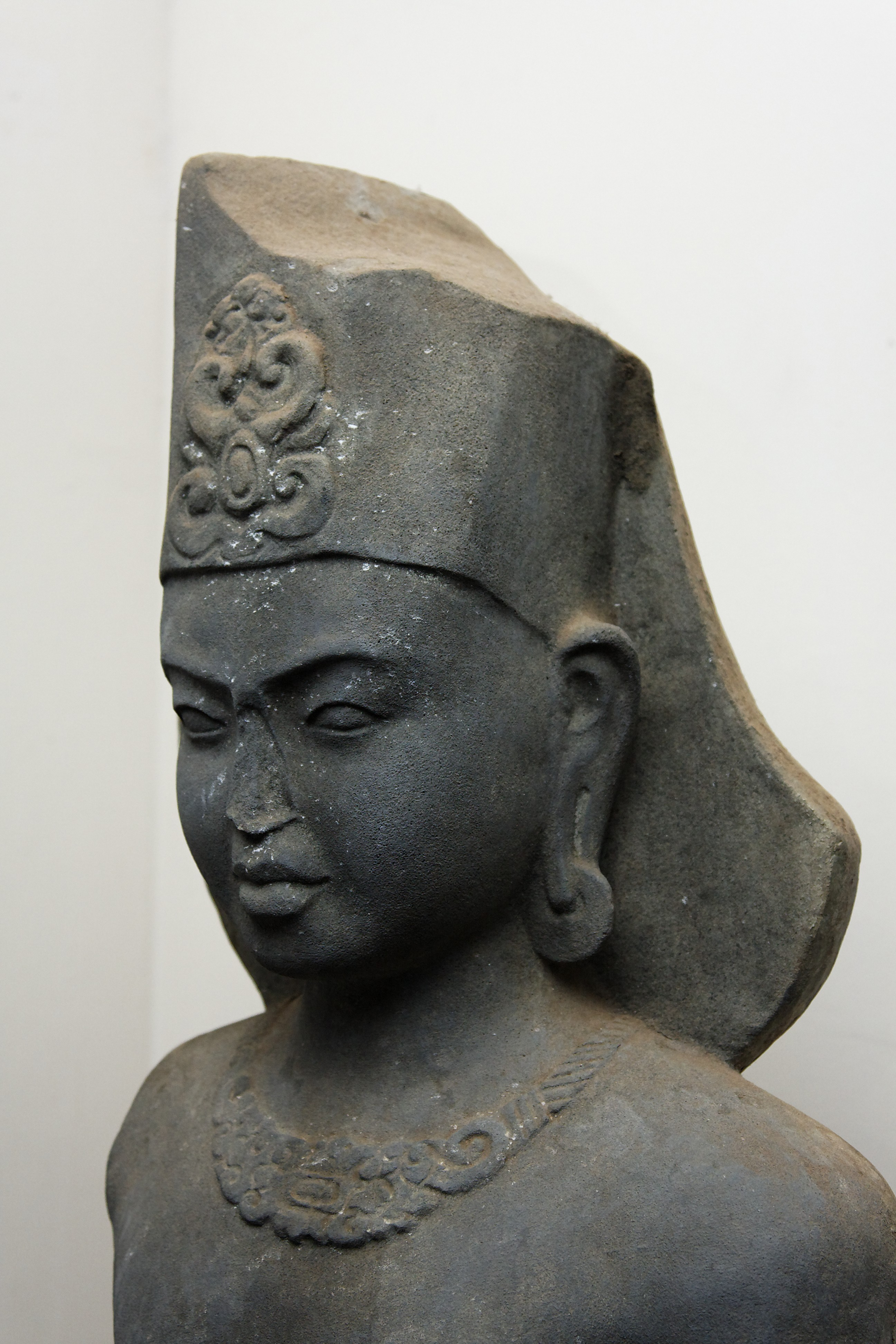
Si Thep Historical Park, Statue of Surya, Dvaravati period.

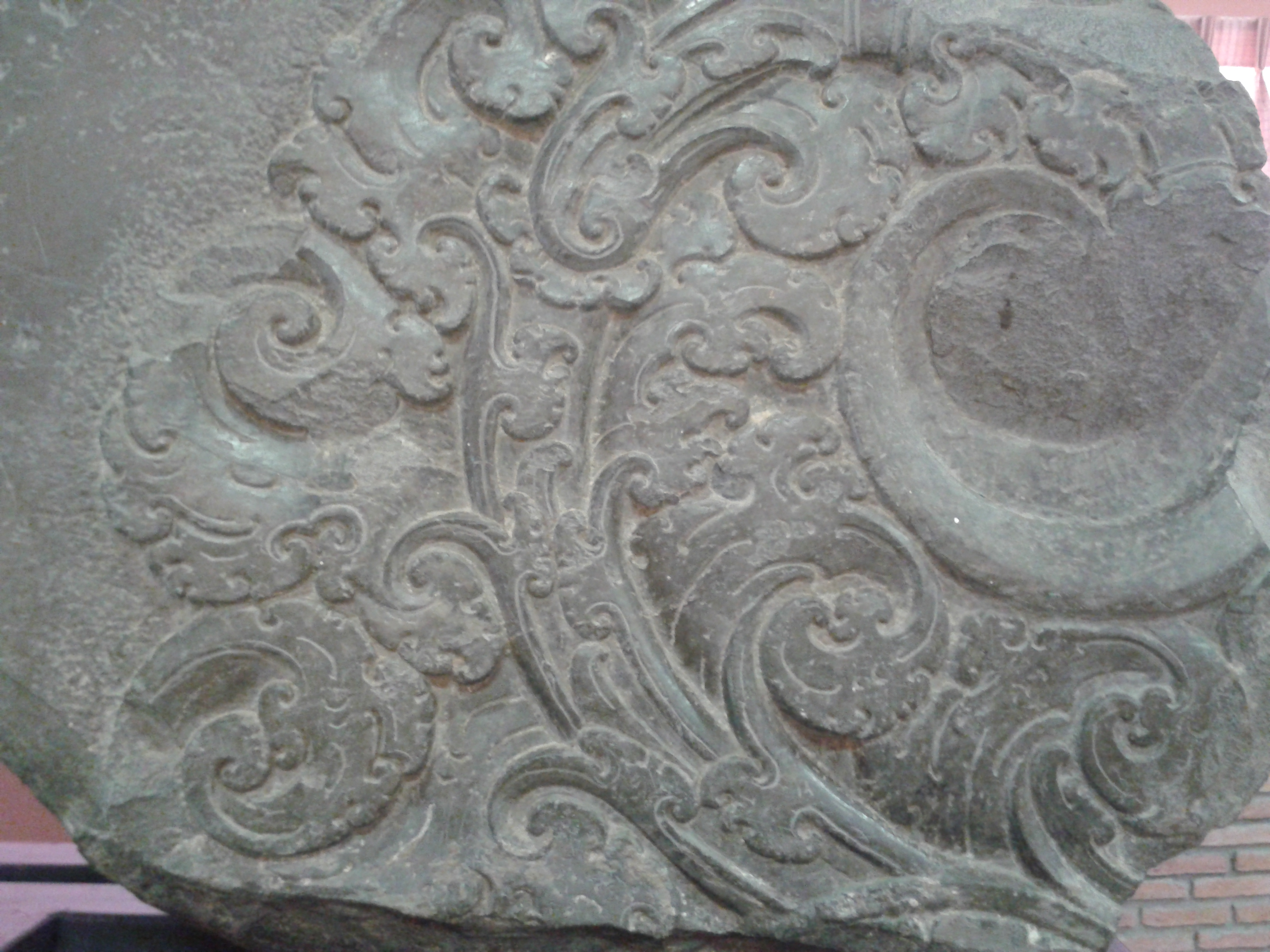
Dvaravati period stone sculpture located in Phra Pathom Chedi National Museum

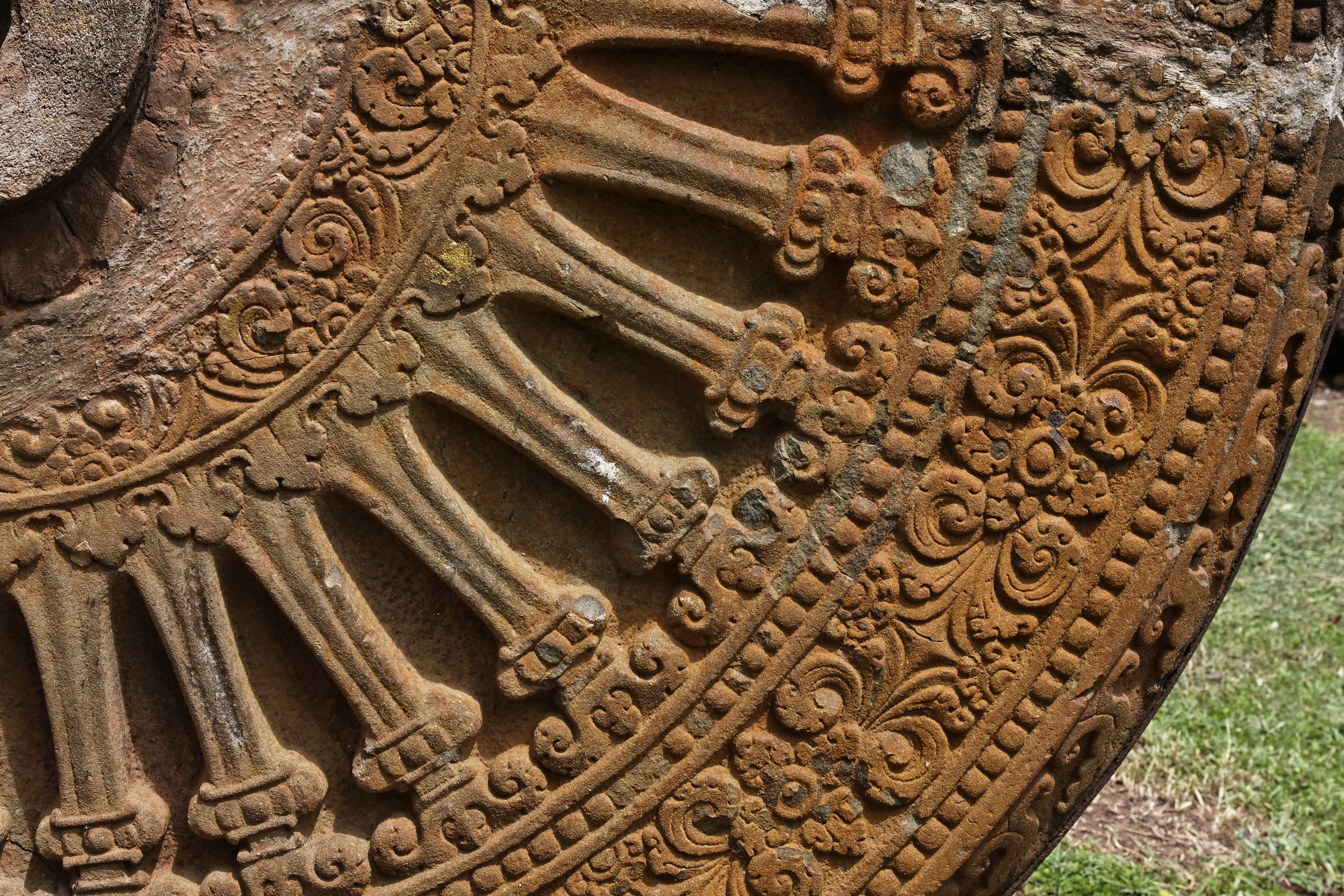
The Buddhist wheel of the law dharmachakra is located at Khao Khlang Nai in Si Thep Historical Park.

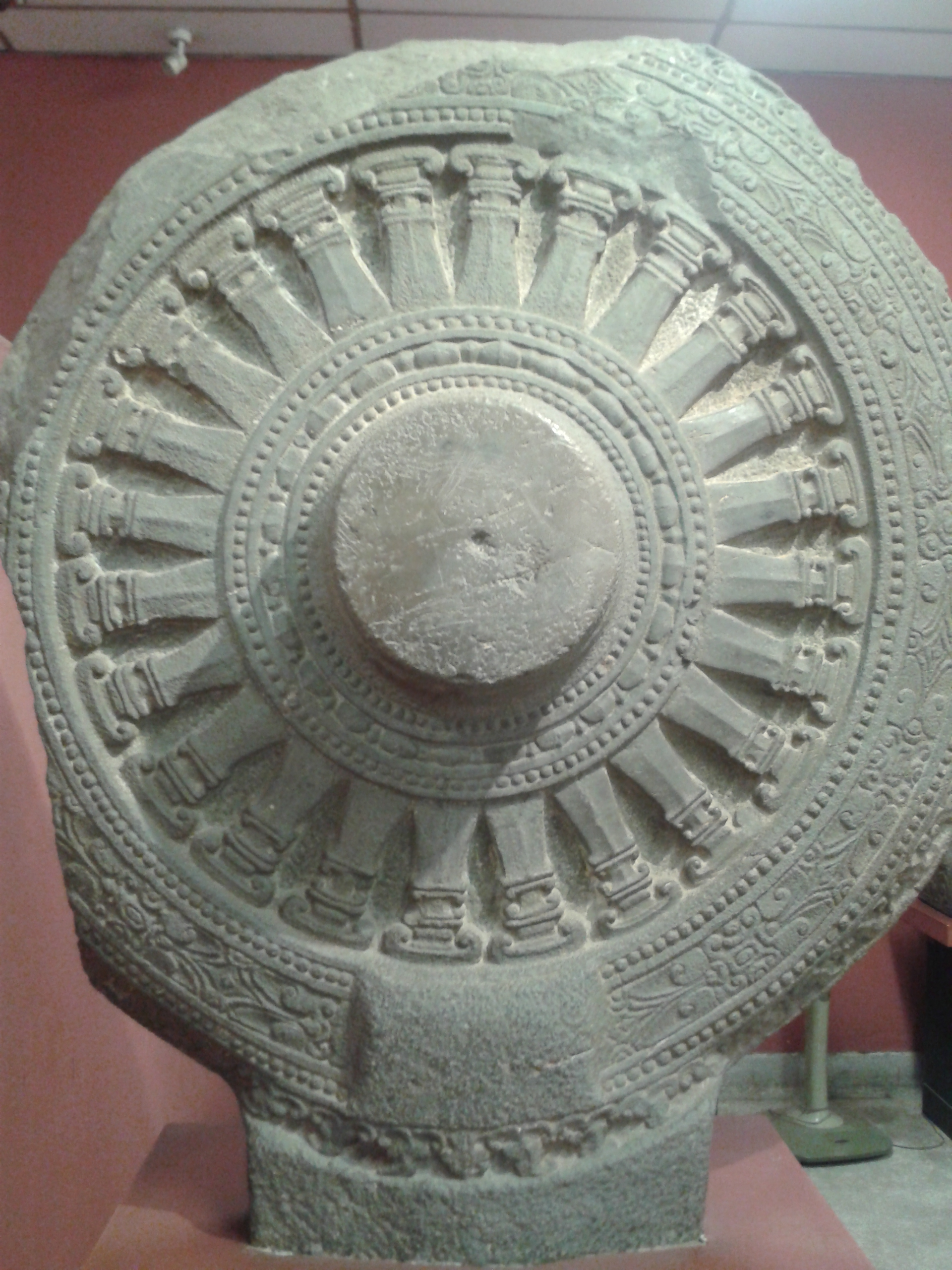
Dvaravati period stone dharmachakra, Phra Pathom Chedi National Museum.

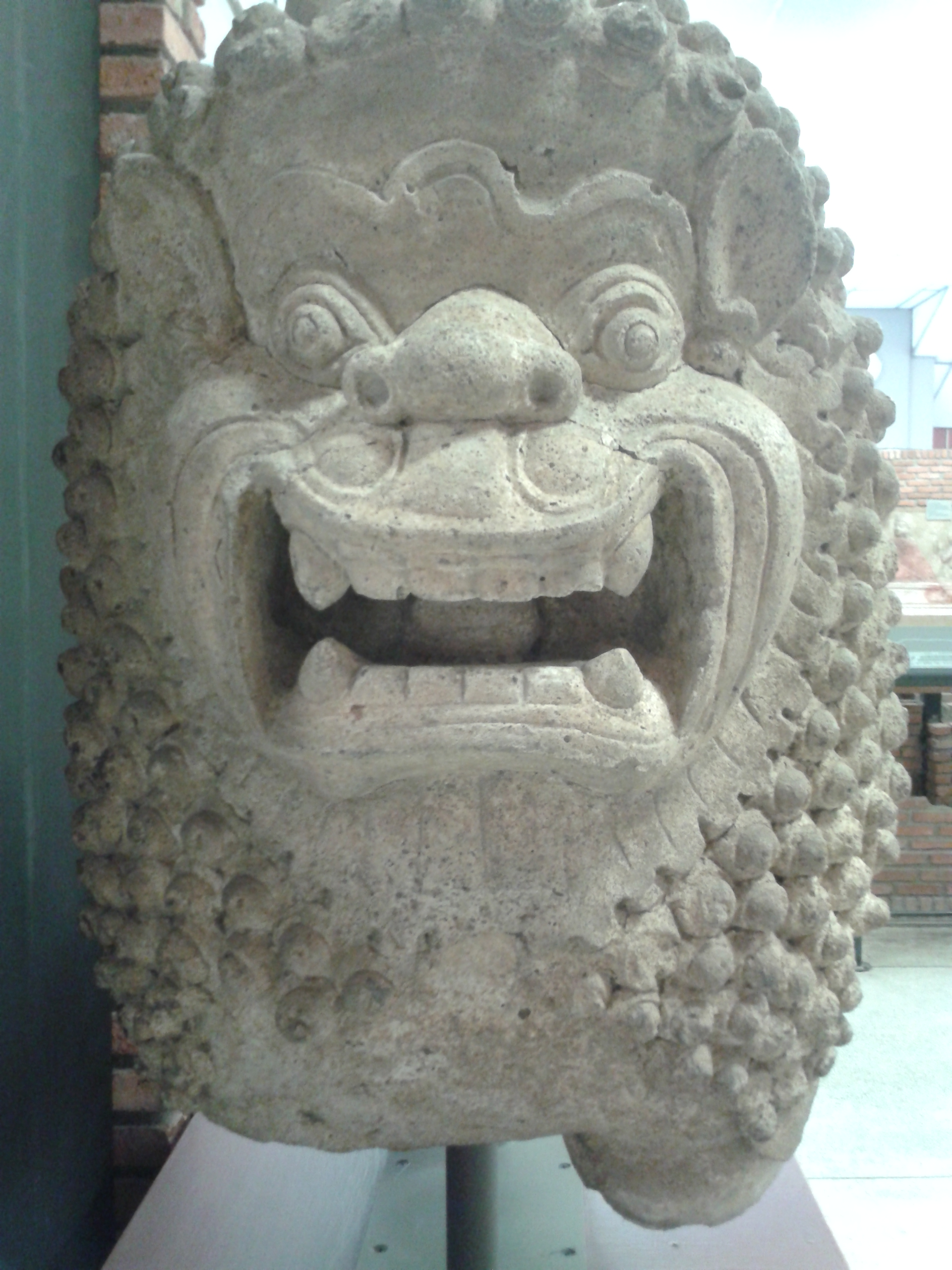
Dvaravati period lion stucco, Phra Pathom Chedi National Museum.

=== Srivijaya art ===
During the 8th-13th centuries CE, Southern Thailand may have been influenced by the Srivijaya Kingdom, which encompassed Sumatra and the Malay Peninsula. This resulted in similarities between Srivijaya art in Southern Thailand and Central Java art in Indonesia, specifically in bronze sculptures and votive tablets. The ancient sites in Chaiya, Southern Thailand, also bear resemblances to Central Java art, with Wat Phra Borommathat Chaiya being the most similar. The majority of sculptures discovered in Southern Thailand are of religious significance, depicting figures such as the Avalokitesvara, Buddha protected by a Nāga, and clay votive tablets with Buddhist iconography. Srivijaya art in Southern Thailand, from Surat Thani to Songkhla, displays the influence of Indian art styles such as Gupta, post-Gupta, and Pala–sena, indicating a strong connection to Mahayana Buddhism.

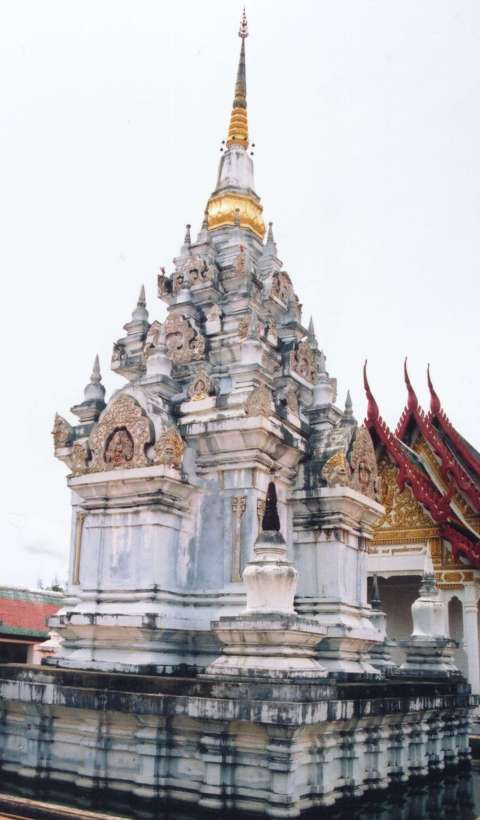
Wat Phra Borom That Chaiya, Surat Thani province.

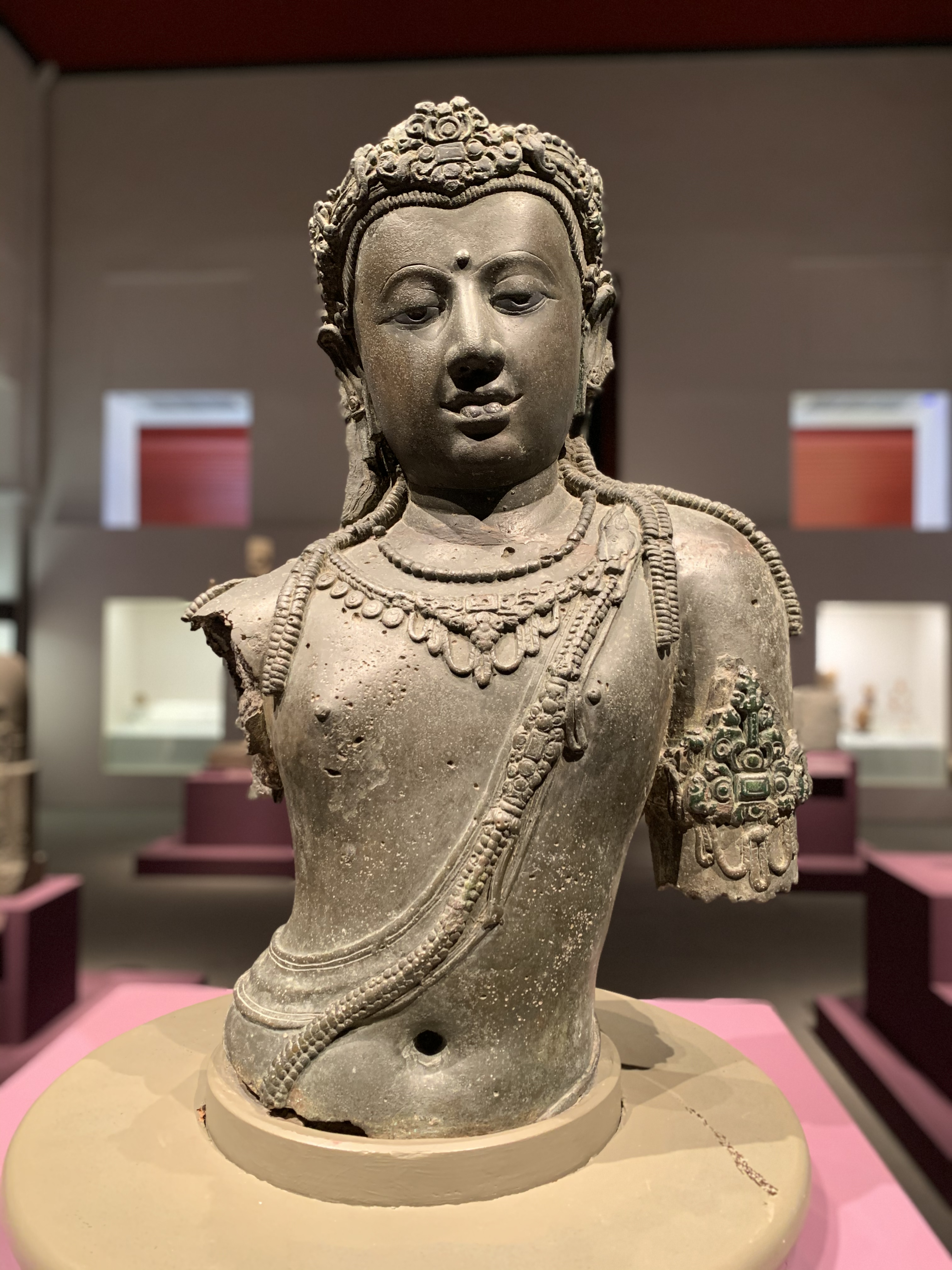
c. 9th Century, Bronze Bust of Avalokiteshvara, Wat Phra Borom That Chaiya, Surat Thani province.

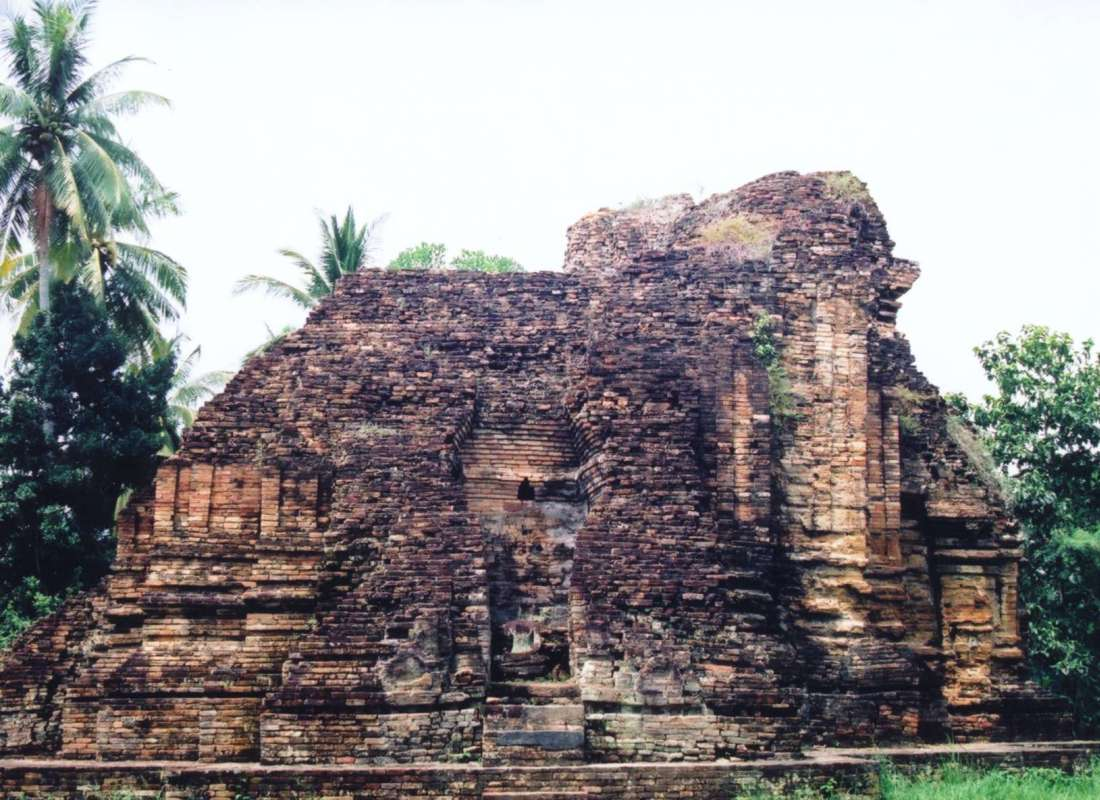
Ruins of Wat Kaew, Chaiya, Surat Thani province.

=== Lavo art in Thailand – Lopburi art ===
Between the 11th and 13th centuries CE, central and northeastern Thailand was ruled by the Khmers of Cambodia and as a result, Brahmin–Hinduism emerged. It led to the development of artistic styles, sculptures, and architecture similar to the Khmer also known as Khom in Thai language. This artistic expression is known as the Lopburi style, named after the ancient city of Lopburi or Lavo and refers to both the Khmer-influenced and genuinely Khmer artistic movement in Thailand.

Lopburi artists were primarily associated with Brahmin-Hinduism, and later, Mahayana Buddhism. Surviving examples of their art are mainly stone and bronze carvings. The Lopburi architectural style used bricks and stones, with the Prang style being the most common, influenced by the Khmer Angkor style. In the 13th century AD, the Sukhothai Kingdom was established, and the Lopburi Kingdom came under its influence. During this time, artistic works aimed to establish a Thai identity.

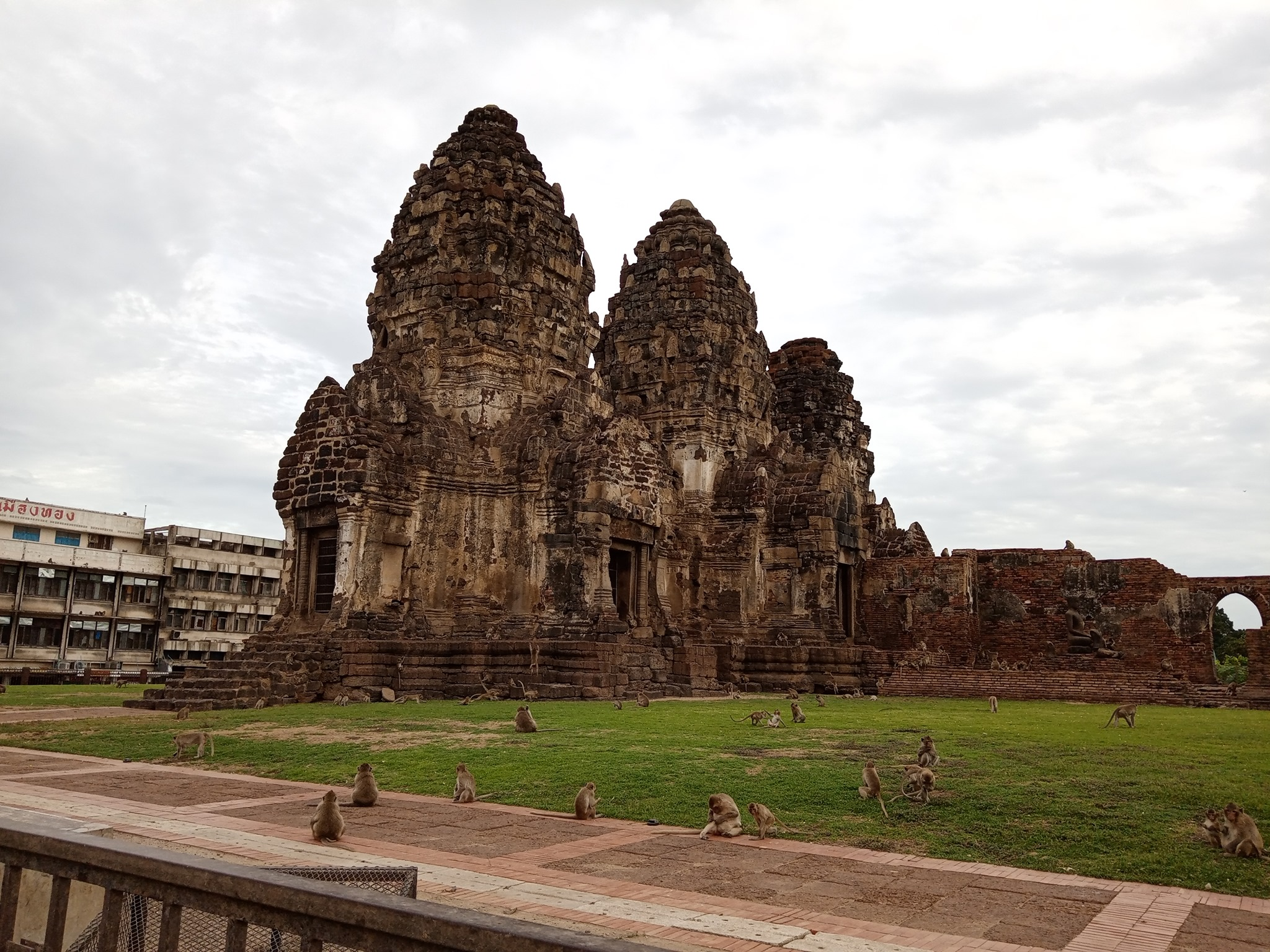
Phra Prang Sam Yot, a Khmer temple in Lopburi province

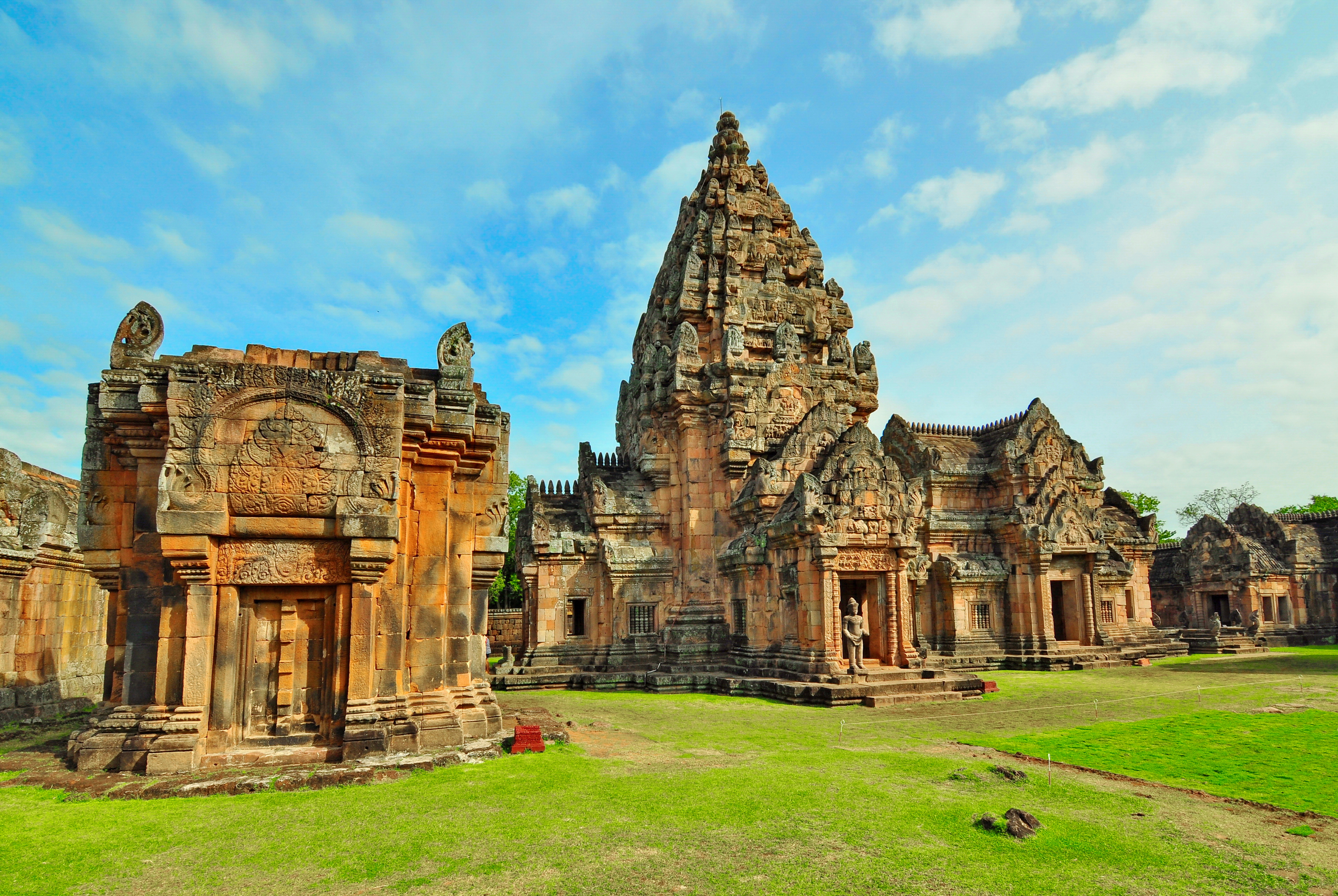
Phanom Rung, a Khmer temple in Buriram province

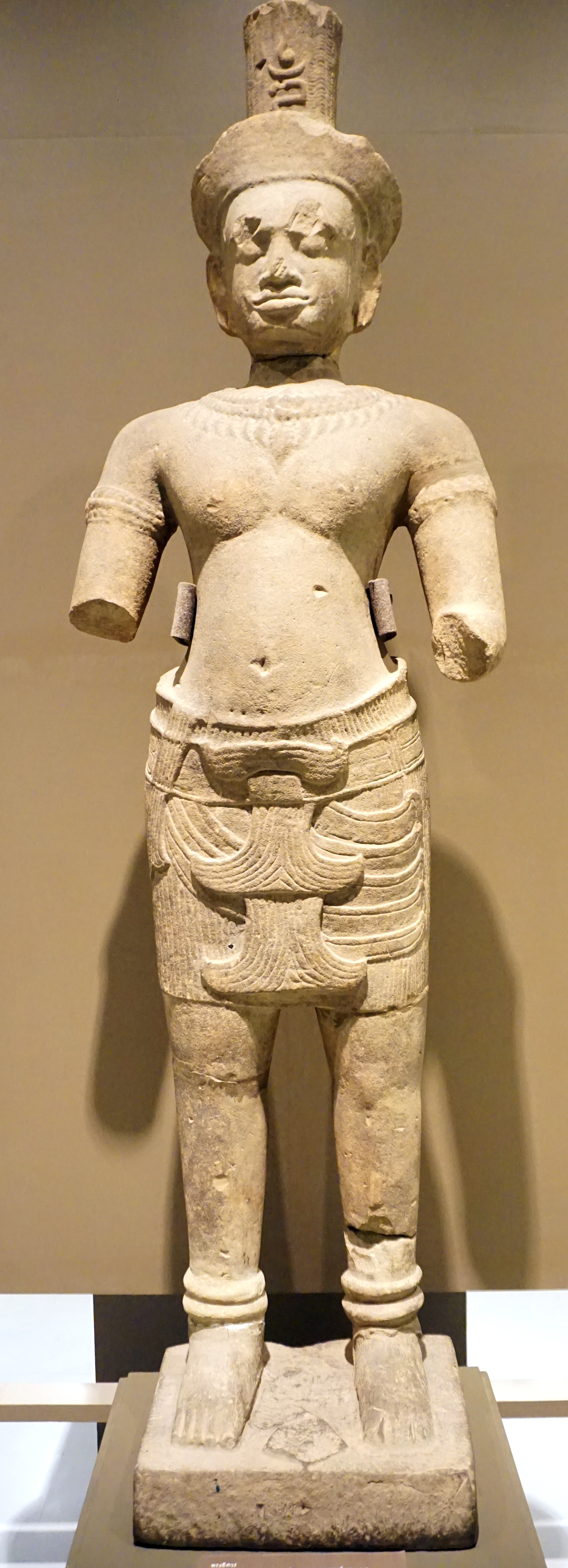
Shiva, 11th century, Lopburi.

=== U-Thong art ===
U-Thong art, also known as Suphannaphum-Ayothaya art, emerged in central Thailand between the 12th and 15th centuries CE, contemporaneously with Chiang Saen and Sukhothai art. This style received its name from the U-Thong Kingdom, which was centered in the U Thong District, although this kingdom's existence is ambiguous. It is characterized by a Buddha image style influenced by Dvaravati, Lopburi, and Sukhothai arts, with the Dvaravati influence being the most prominent. The resulting architecture and fine arts are collectively referred to as U-Thong and can be found in various provinces, including Suphanburi, Nakhon Pathom, Chai Nat, Lopburi, and Ayutthaya.

U-Thong architecture is closely related to Theravada Buddhism and features low-roofed ubosot, vihāra, and chedis constructed with wood. A unique style of U-Thong chedi has an octagonal base, eight-sided structure, lotus crystal-adorned roof, and bell. These chedis are commonly found at various temples, such as Sankhaburi in Chai Nat province or some temples in Suphanburi. Another type of U-Thong chedi is found at Wat Phra Borommathat in Chai Nat province and shows similarities to Srivijaya art.

Bronze sculptures from the U-Thong period exemplify elaborate casting, inheriting from the earlier Dvaravati art. Sukhothai art mixed with U-Thong art, resulting in lighter Buddha statues with flame auras, eventually becoming characteristic of early Ayutthaya art. The U-Thong or Ayothaya Kingdom was dissolved with the establishment of the Ayutthaya Kingdom.

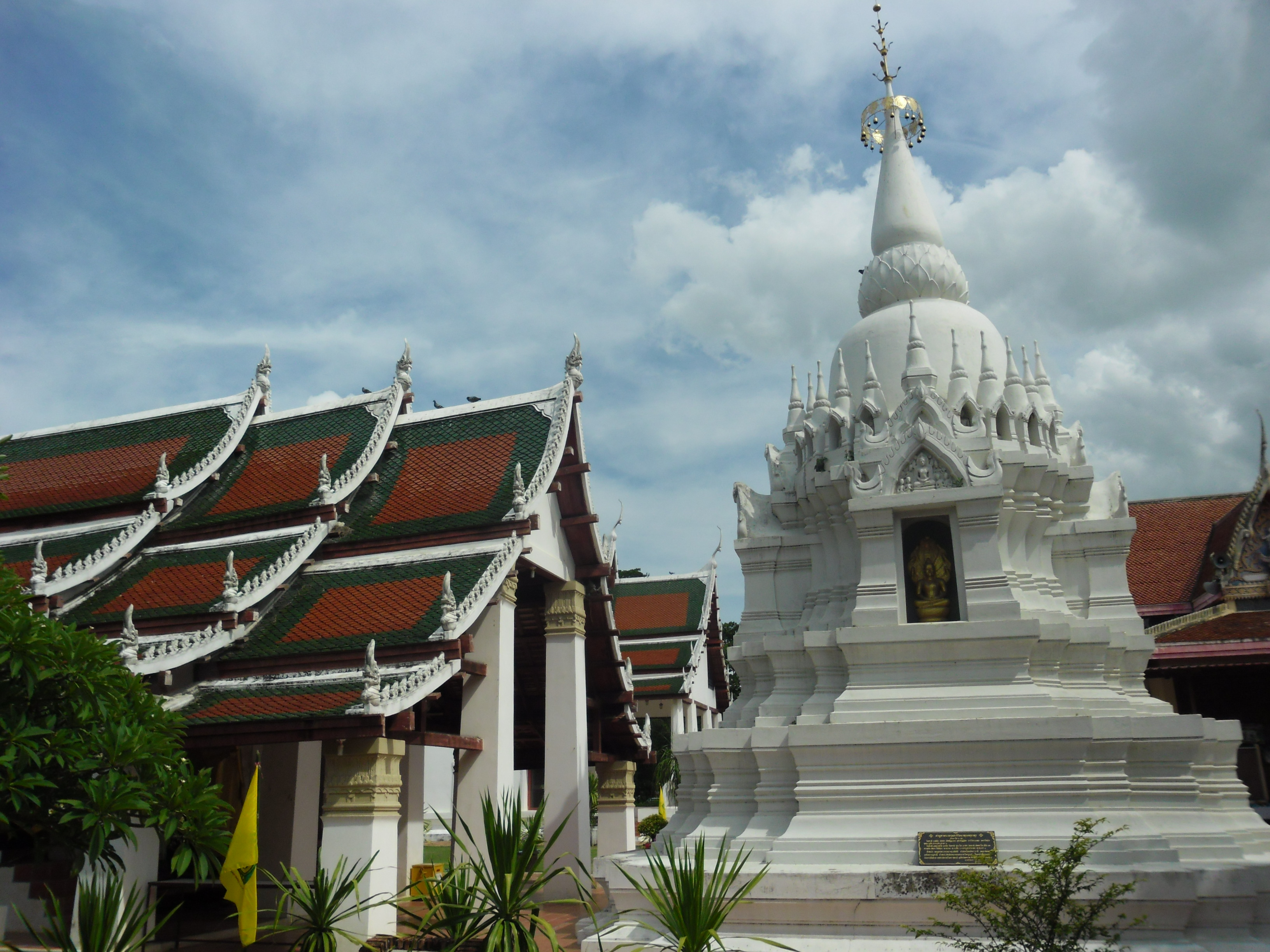
Wat Phra Borommathat Worawihan, Chai Nat province

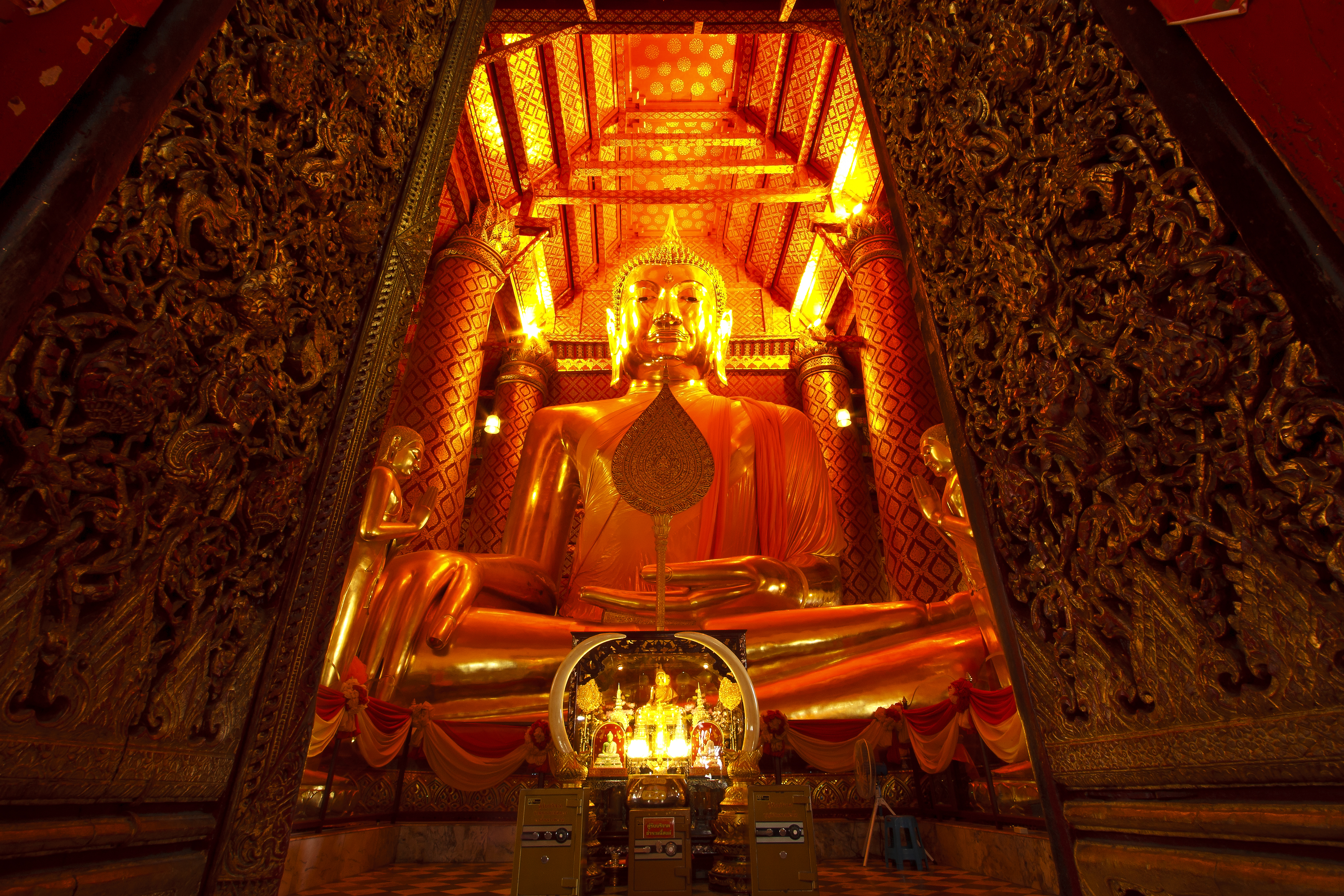
Phra Phuttha Trairattananayok, Wat Phanan Choeng, Ayutthaya province

=== Sukhothai art ===
Sukhothai art emerged in the 13th to 15th centuries CE, coincided with the establishment of the Sukhothai Kingdom. This art form was influenced by Theravada Buddhism, which was propagated from Lanka through Nakhon Si Thammarat. One of the most notable characteristics of Sukhothai art is the authentic Sukhothai-style chedi, also referred to as Phum khao bin, which has a distinct lotus-shaped design.

Another defining feature of Sukhothai art is the Buddha images' graceful and elegant form, which exhibits refined proportions, a distinctive flame-like halo around the head, and a serene expression. These Buddha images are typically seated in the half-lotus posture with the right hand performing the earth-touching gesture or walking with one foot forward and the right hand raised to the chest. The walking Buddha, in particular, is a unique style closely associated with Sukhothai.

The Sukhothai Kingdom was also renowned for its exceptional glazed ceramics, which were produced in the Sangkhalok style. These ceramics featured delicate blue-green or grayish-green tints and intricate designs painted in black or a darker hue of the glaze. They were fired at high temperatures, resulting in a durable and robust body. Despite its short-lived existence, the Sukhothai Kingdom's artistic legacy remains influential to this day. The kingdom's artistry and craftsmanship were absorbed into the Ayutthaya Kingdom, which succeeded it.

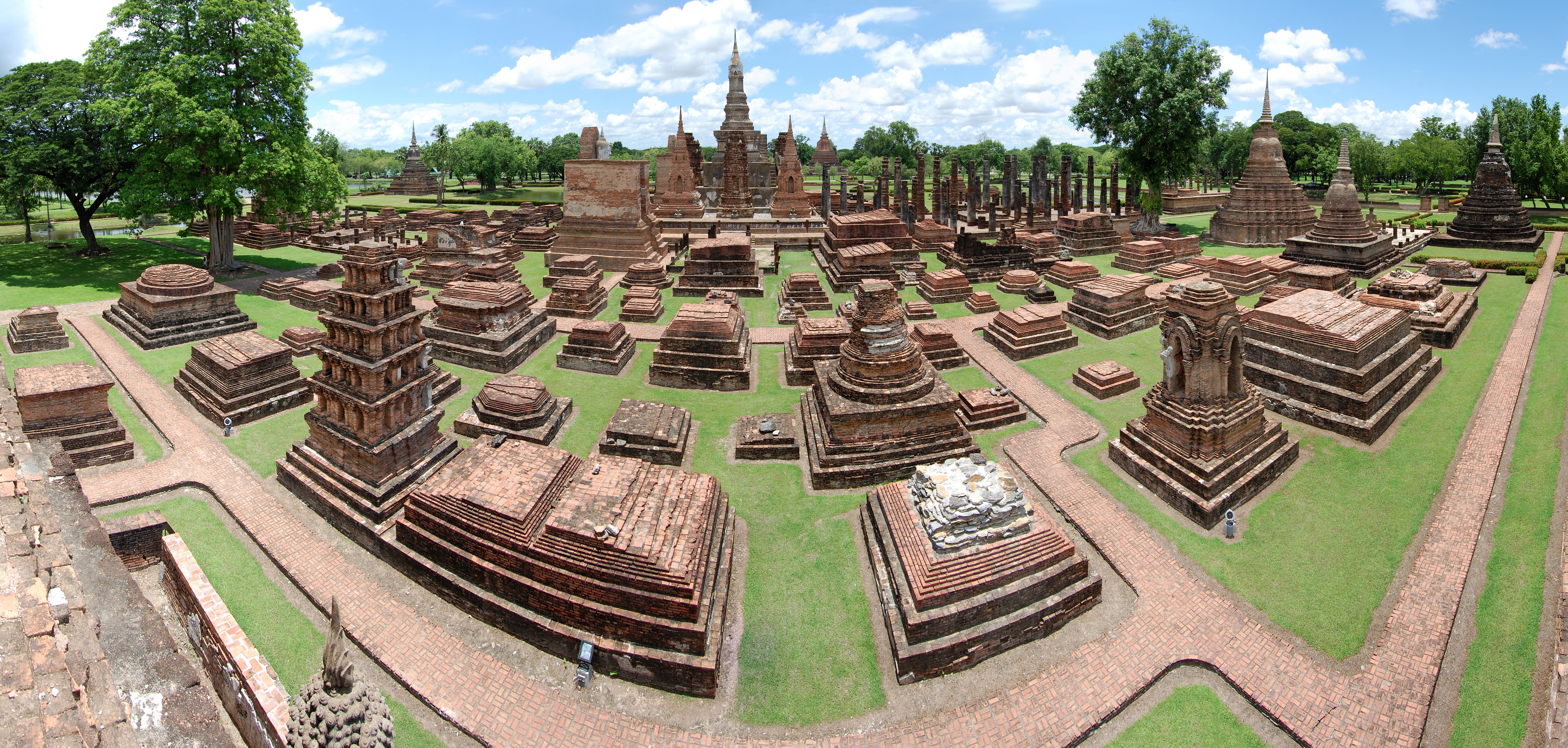
The ruins of Wat Mahathat, Sukhothai Historical Park

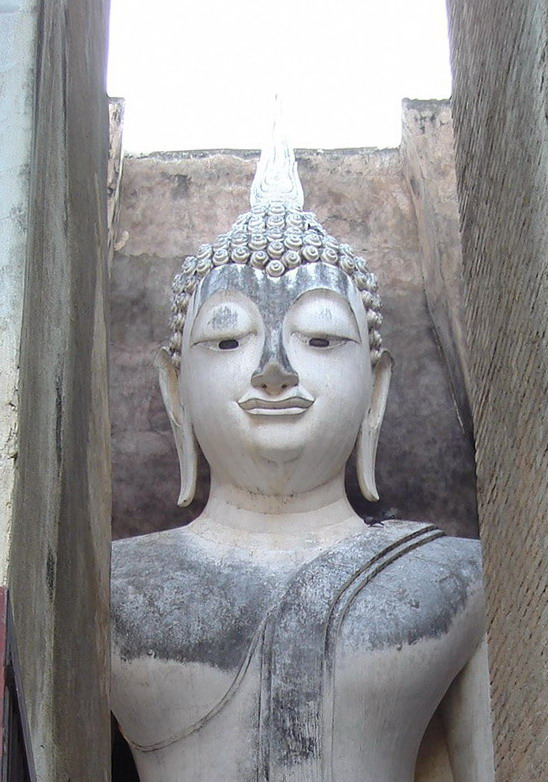
Phra Achana, Wat Si Chum, Big Buddha image, Sukhothai

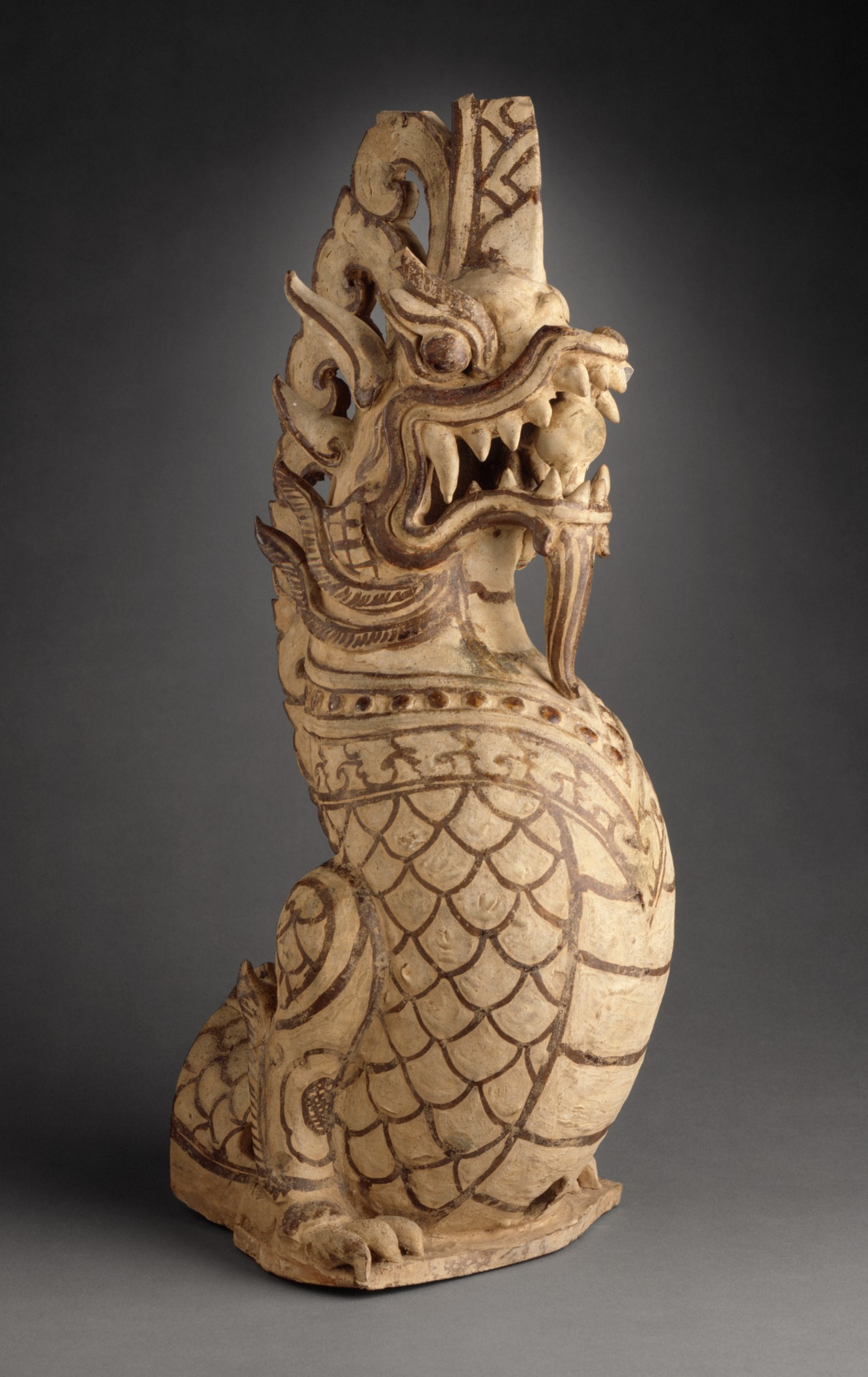
Sawankhalok, depicted a Makara mythical creature.

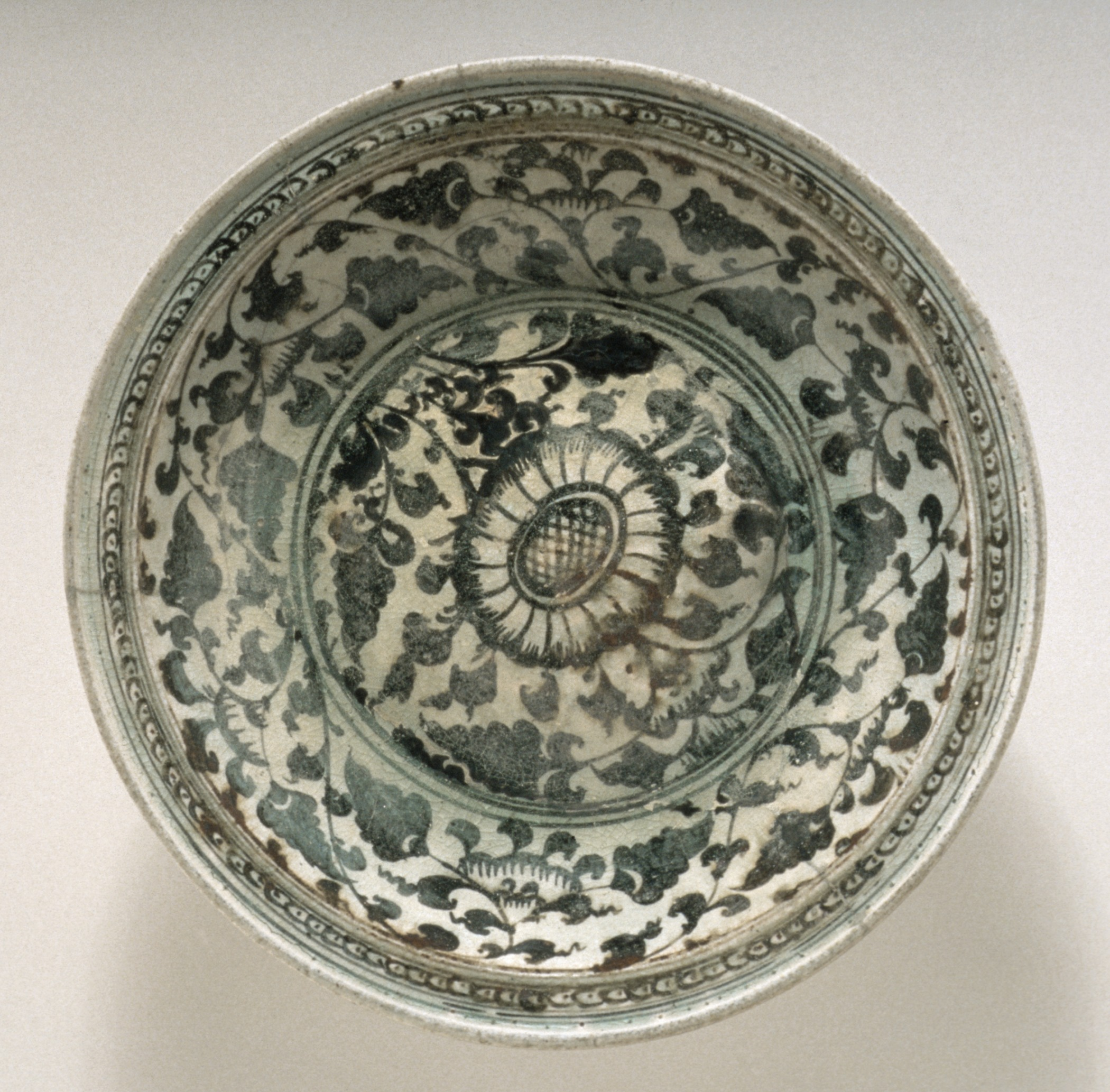
14th century, Sawankhalok.

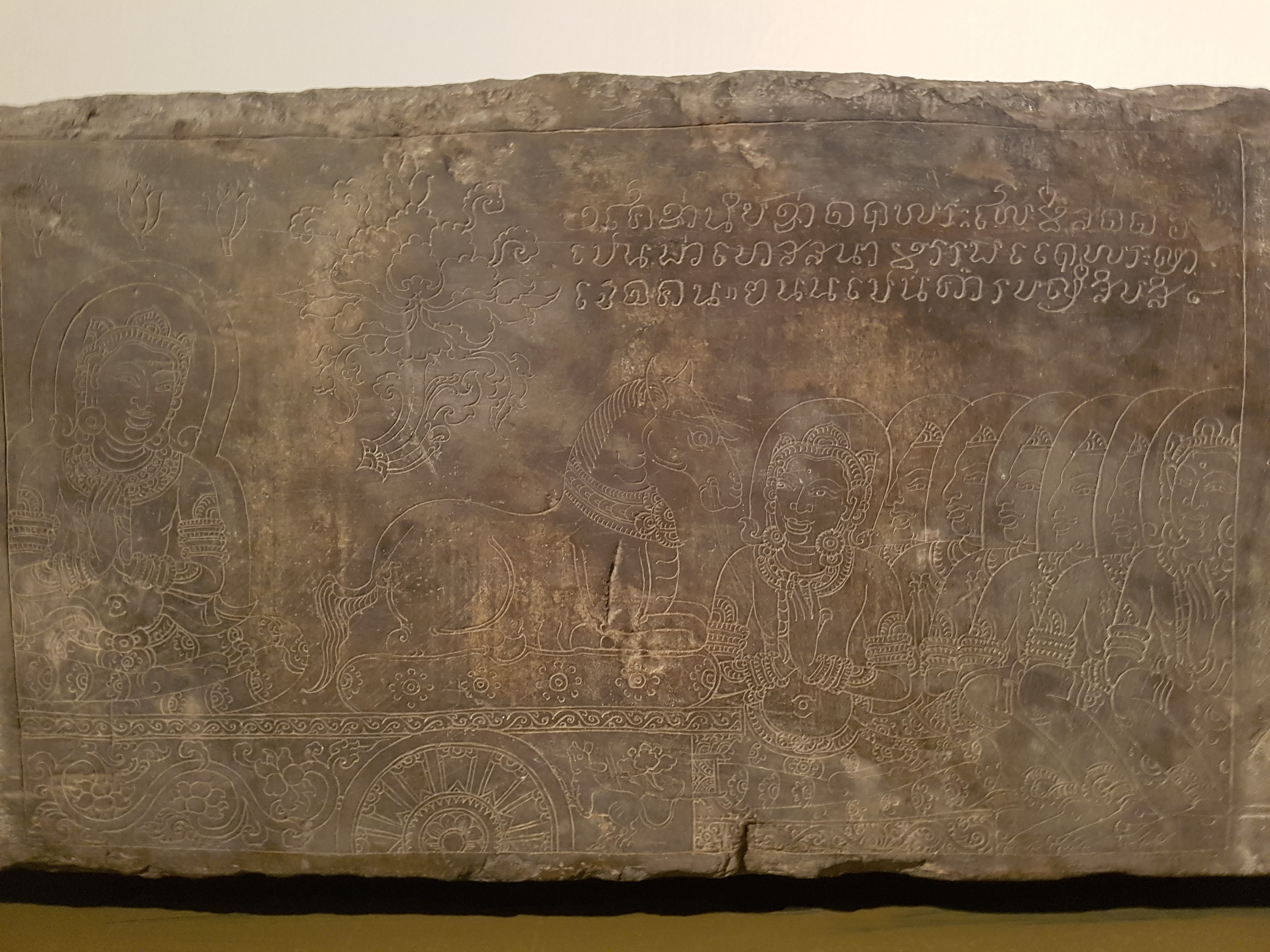
Relief containing a scene from the Gojaniya jātaka, Sukhothai art, 14/15th century AD, Wat Si Chum, Sukhothai Historical Park, Sukhothai province.

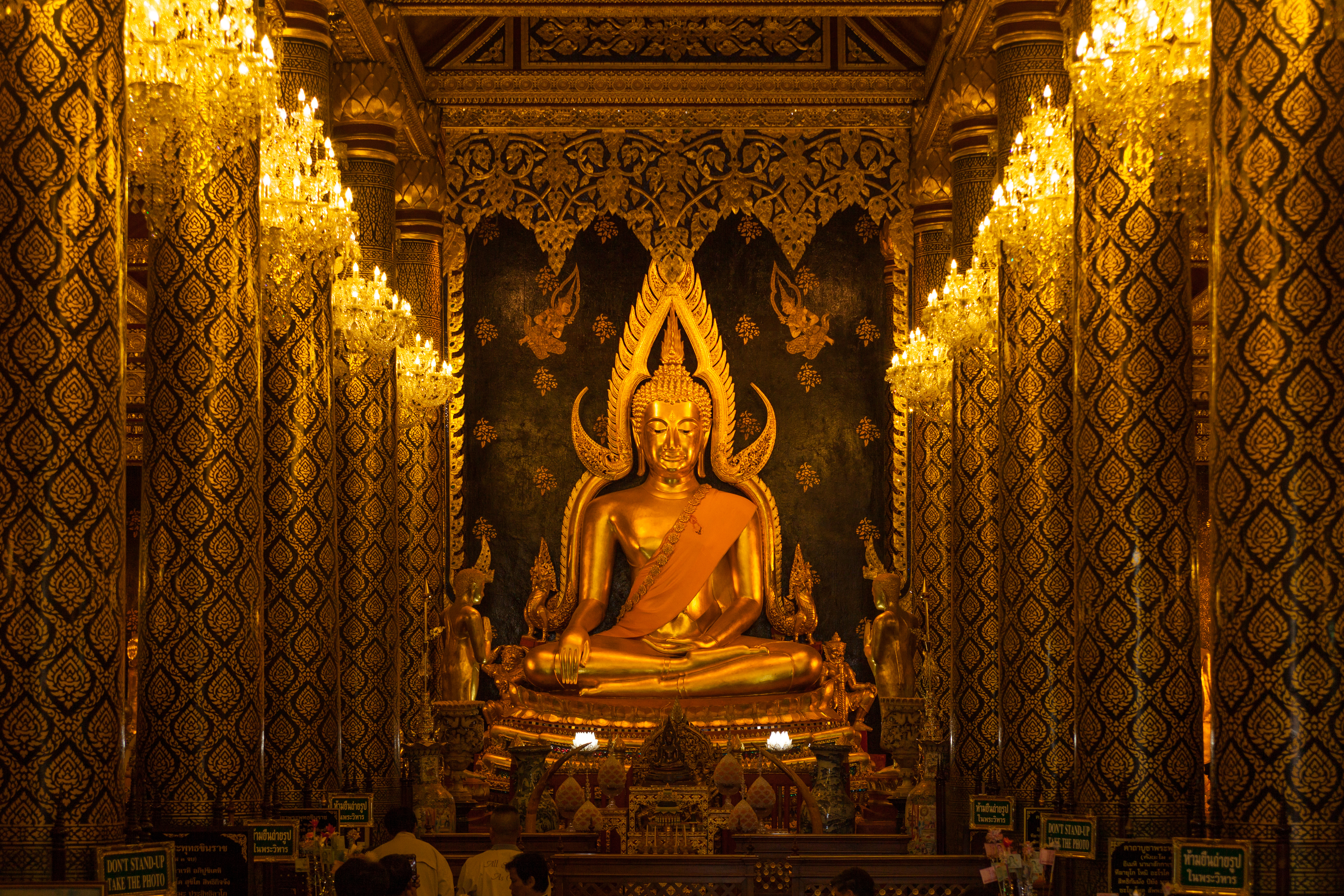
Phra Phuttha Chinnarat at Wat Phra Si Rattana Mahathat, Phitsanulok province.

=== Lanna art ===
Lanna art, also known as Chiang Saen art, denotes an artistic tradition that emerged in northern Thailand, spanning the period from the 14th to the 19th century AD. Its inception was in Chiang Saen; however, the establishment of the Lanna Kingdom with Chiang Mai as its capital caused a shift in artistic production. Lanna art is deeply entrenched in Theravada Buddhism, which was the dominant religion in the region. While initially, it drew inspiration from Hariphunchai art, it gradually evolved its distinct style.

Lanna chedis are typically bell-shaped, evolving from a round plan to a polygonal plan as seen in the pagoda at Wat Phra That Doi Suthep. Some chedis, for example, the one containing King Tilokaraj's ashes at Wat Chet Yot, were influenced by Sukhothai architecture. The Buddha images of Lanna are frequently depicted with specific attributes like a round face, a smiling expression, and curled-up hair or an egg-shaped face with a halo of flames.

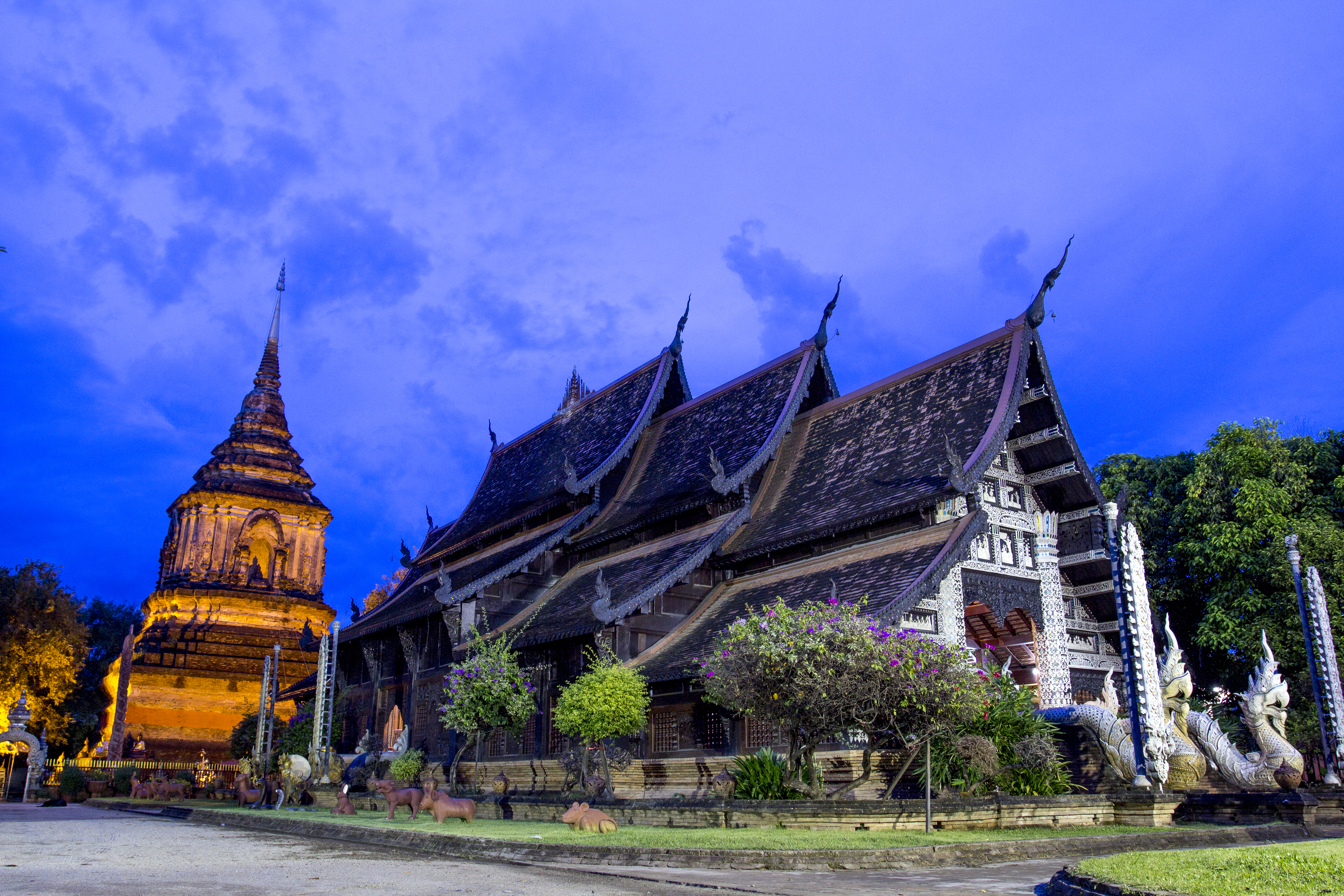
Wat Lok Moli, Chiang Mai

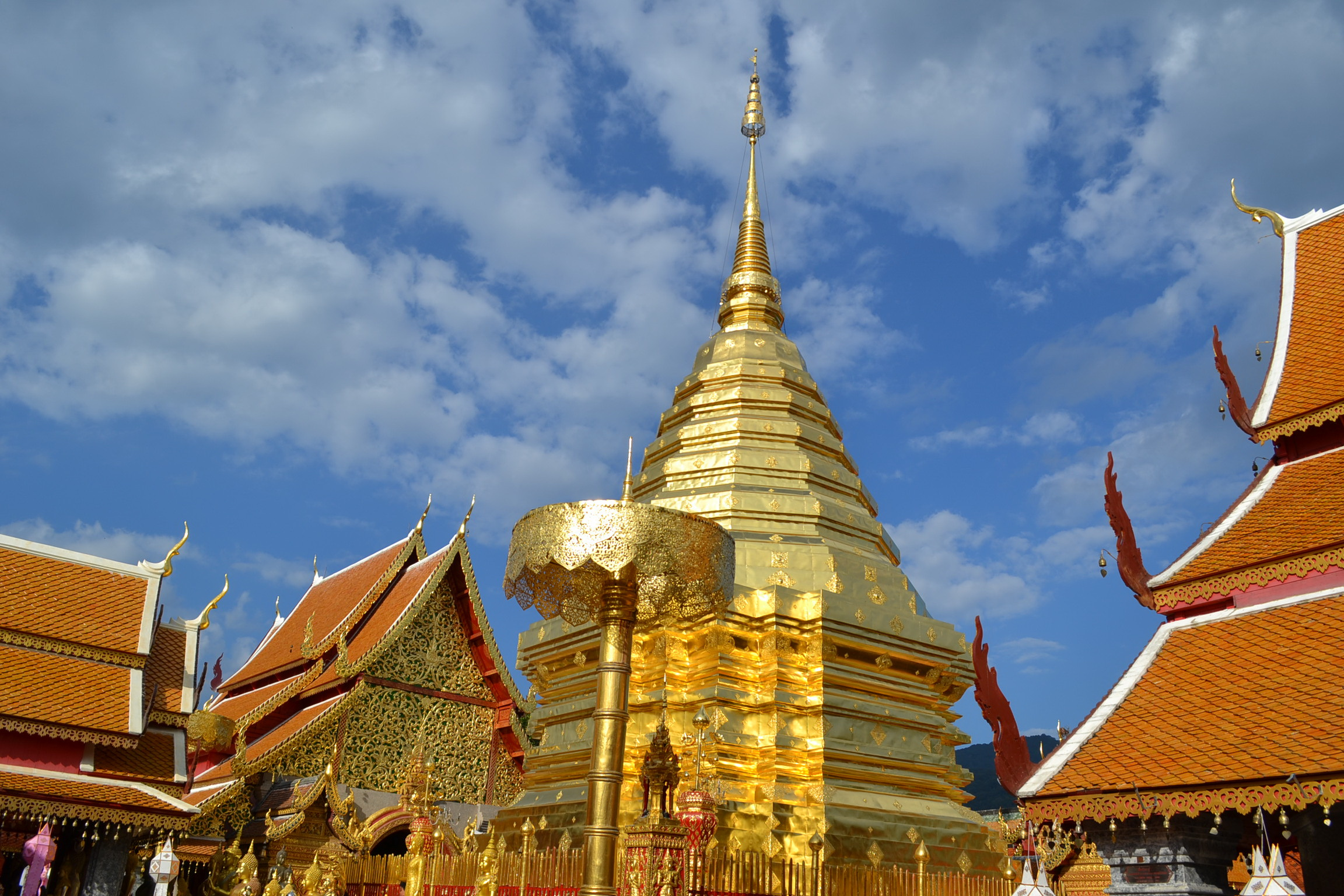
Wat Phrathat Doi Suthep, Chiang Mai

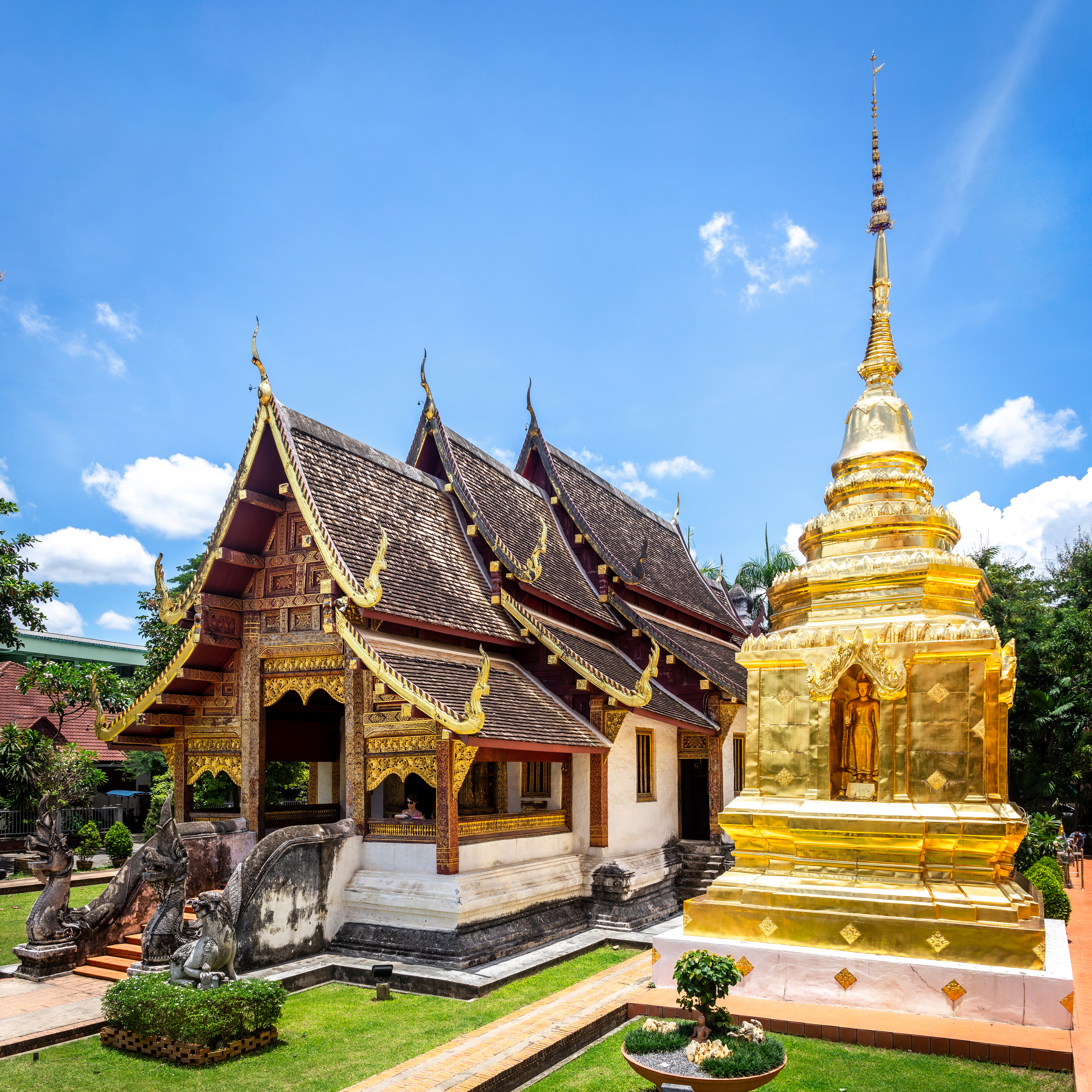
Wat Phra Sing, Chiang Mai

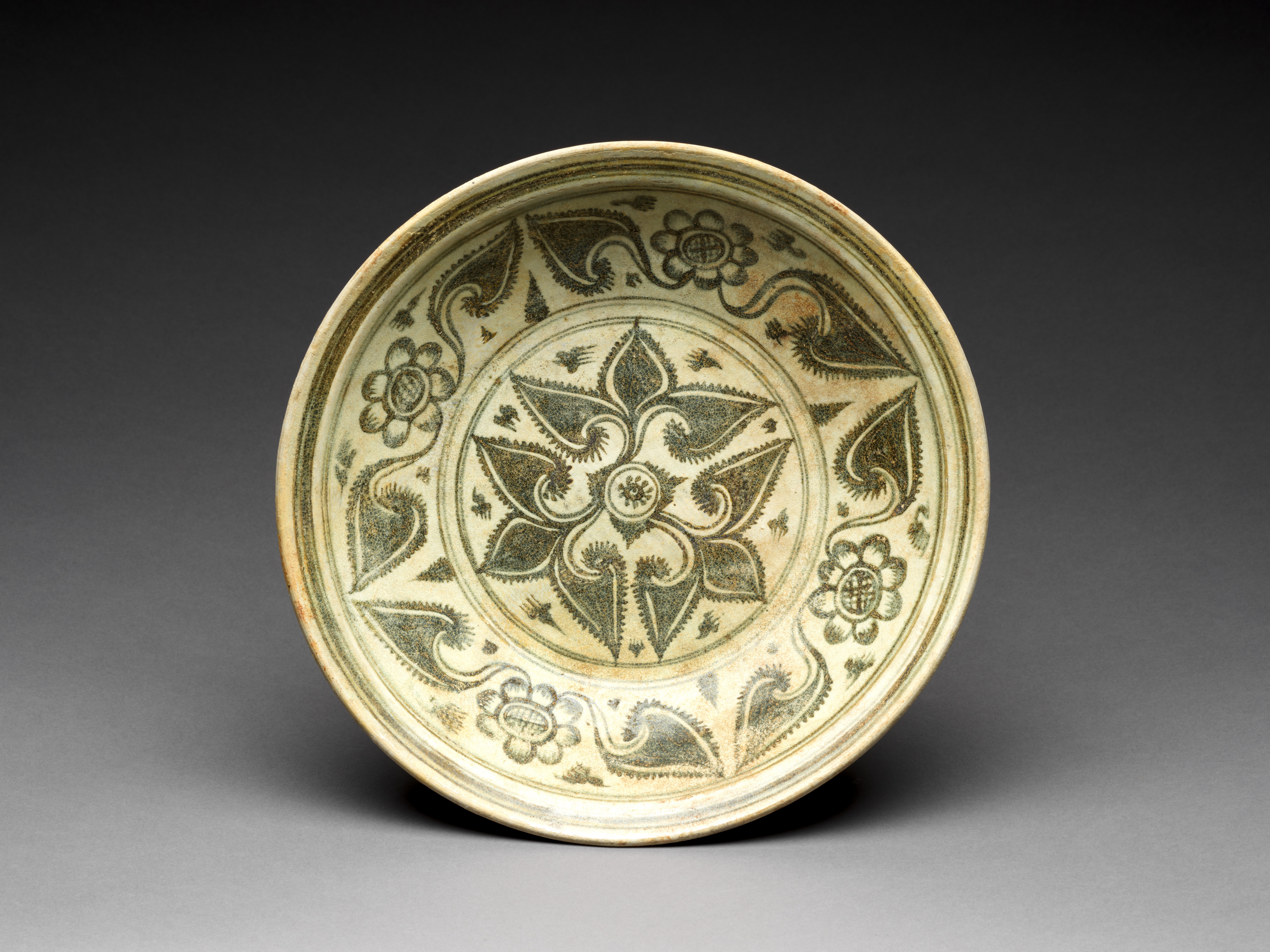
Kalong ware, 15th–16th century

=== Ayutthaya art ===
Ayutthaya art thrived between the 14th and 18th centuries CE, during the rise and dominance of the Ayutthaya Kingdom across much of mainland Southeast Asia. It inherited the artistic traditions of late U-Thong art and developed a distinctive style that blended various cultural influences from Sukhothai, Lopburi, India, Persia, China, Japan, and Europe. Ayutthaya also exerted its artistic influence over its vassal states of Angkor and Lanna.

The art of Ayutthaya was characterized by a diverse array of techniques and styles, including the grand palaces and monasteries decorated with chedis, prangs, and Buddha images. Religious icons were often adorned with regal attire and crowns, emphasizing the close relationship between the king and the Buddha. Artisans showcased their expertise in the creation of lacquerware and mother-of-pearl inlay, producing functional and decorative objects with intricate designs and vivid paintings. These techniques were frequently used to decorate religious objects such as Buddha images.

Chang Sip Mu, which means Ten Essential Traditional Craftsmanship, played a crucial role in both civilian and military fief houses during the Ayutthaya period. This is evidenced by its recognition under the Three Seals Law implemented by King Borommatrailokkanat. Despite the name suggesting only ten groups of highly skilled craftsmen, the group actually comprised more than ten groups who were experts in various fields. However, after the Burmese army burned down the city in 1767 CE, various branches of fine arts that had thrived during the late Ayutthaya period had to disperse because craftsmen were taken away. Despite this unfortunate event, the city's artistic heritage can still be appreciated today at the archaeological site of the historic city and in various museums.

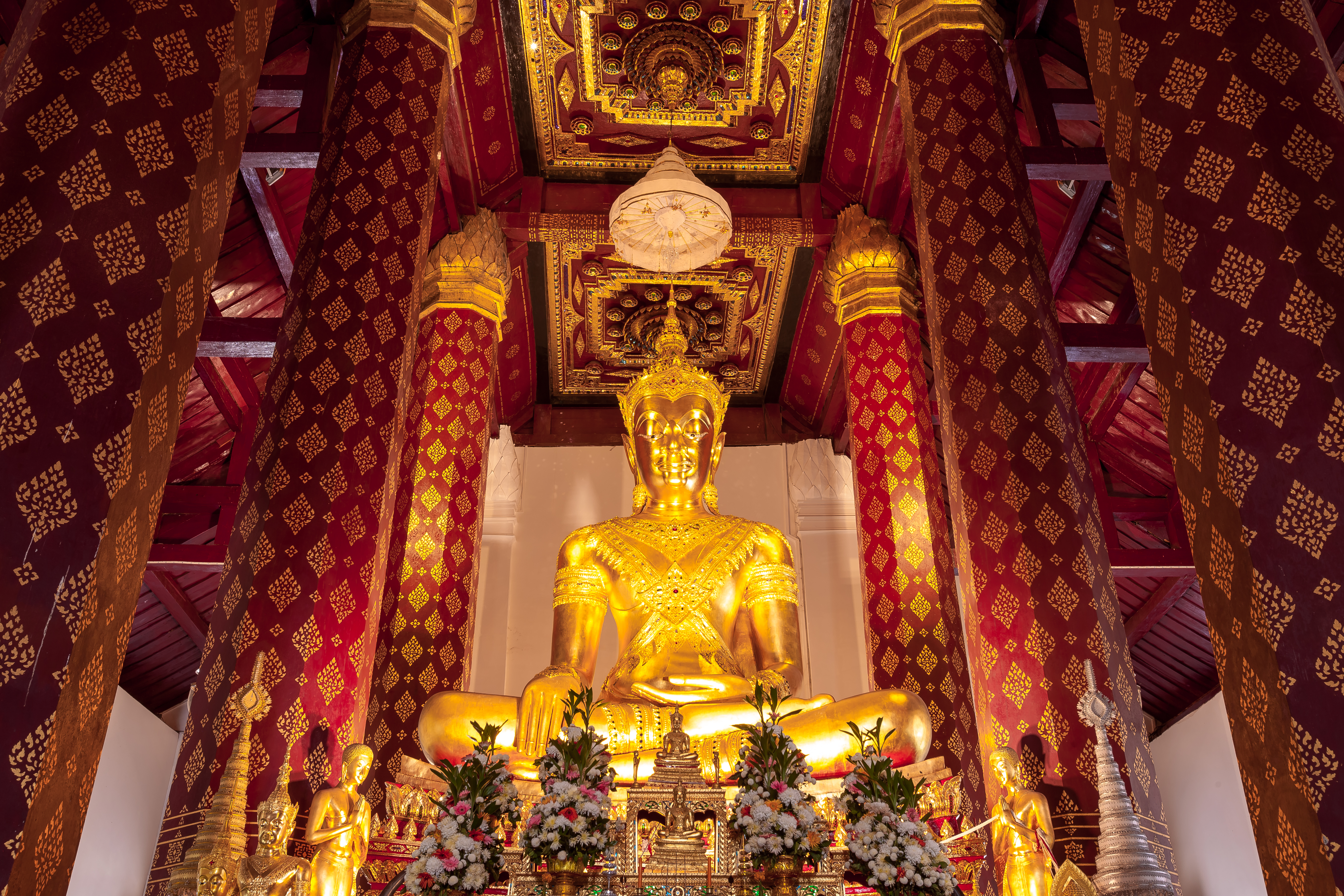
Crowned Buddha, Wat Na Phra Men.

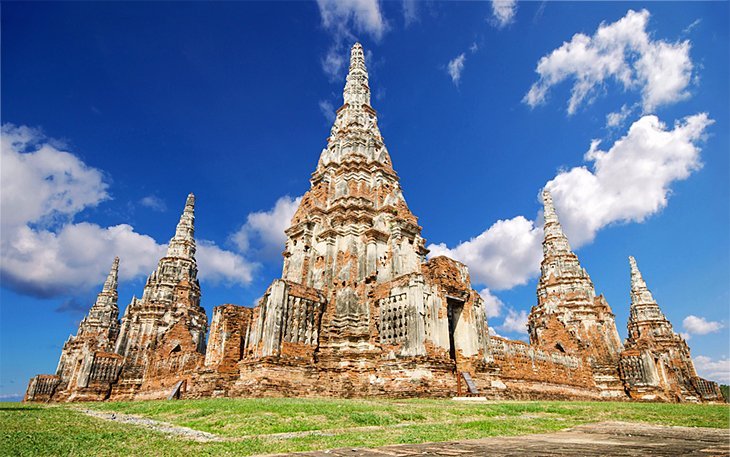
Wat Chaiwatthanaram

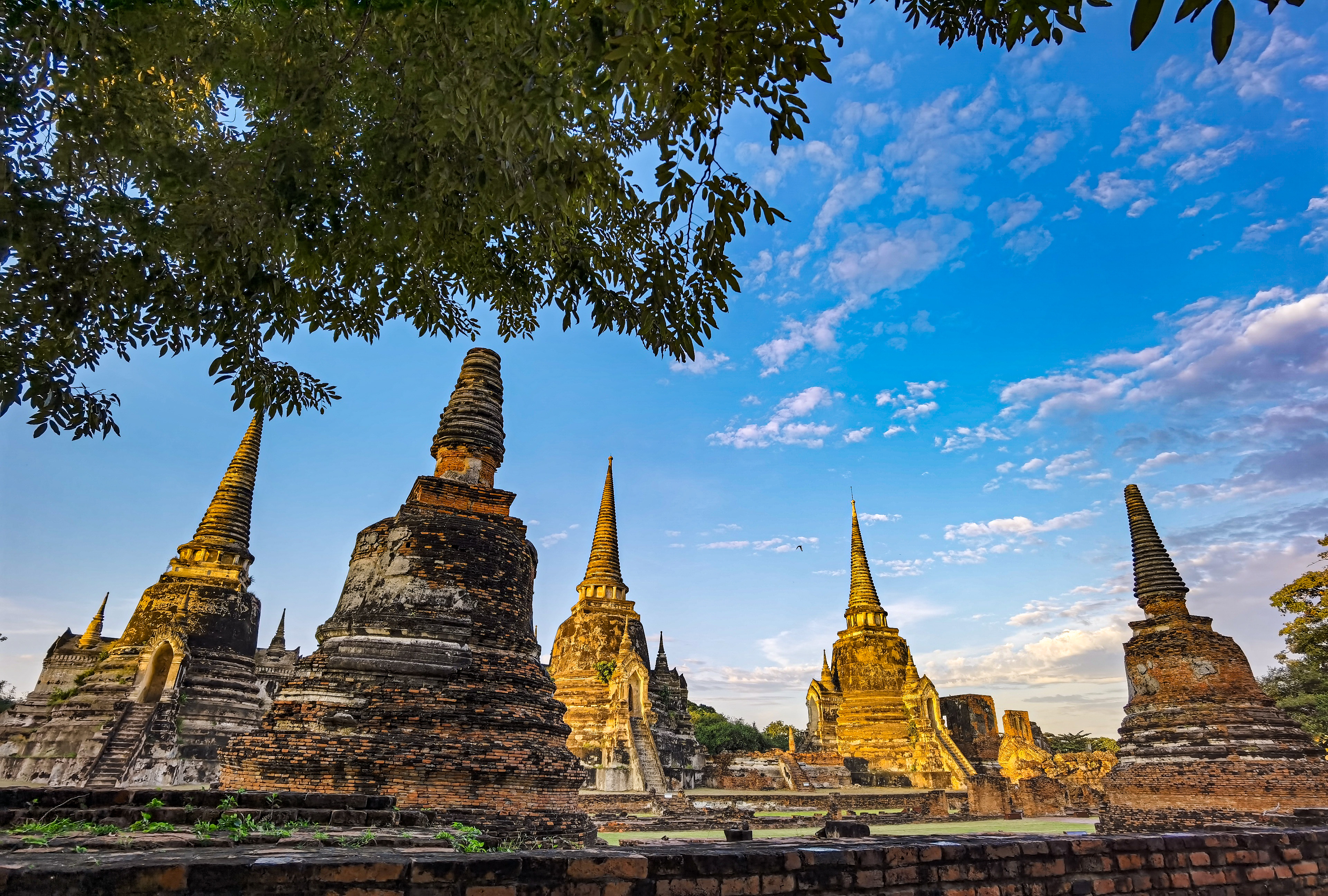
Wat Phra Si Sanphet

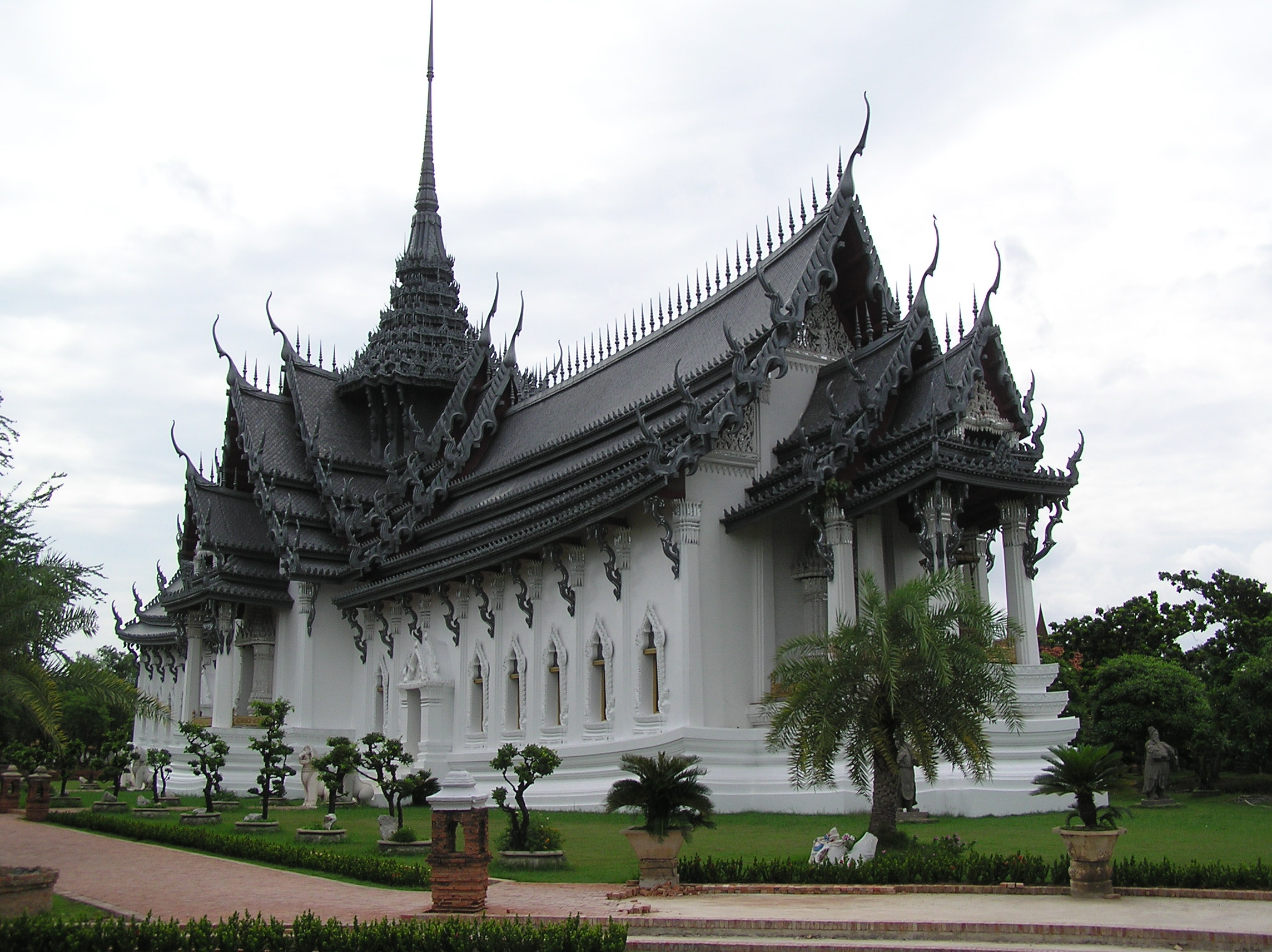
Sanphet Prasat Throne Hall, Ayuthayan kings' palace, replica in Muang Boran

=== Rattanakosin art ===
Rattanakosin art is a style of art that emerged in 1780, when the Rattanakosin Kingdom was founded by King Rama I. The king wanted to revive the artistic traditions that had been lost during the destruction of the Ayutthaya Kingdom by the Burmese. He re-established Chang Sip Mu, a group of ten craftsmen who were responsible for creating fine art in Bangkok. Later, this group became part of the Fine Arts Department.

The early Rattanakosin art was influenced by the late Ayutthaya art, which was characterized by the use of bright colors, gold leaf, and solid backgrounds in paintings. The artists also restored some of the art forms that had been damaged or lost, such as lacquerware and mother-of-pearl inlay.

During the reign of King Rama III, Rattanakosin art began to incorporate elements from other cultures, such as European and Chinese. This was especially evident in architectural art, which blended Thai and Chinese styles. For example, the Grand Palace and Wat Pho were built with Chinese-style roofs and decorations.

King Rama IV introduced more changes to Rattanakosin art, as he was interested in Western science and culture. He adopted European architectural styles and techniques, such as Gothic and neoclassical, and also learned about linear perspective from Western paintings. He hired Khrua In Khong, a talented painter who applied linear perspective to Thai paintings and created realistic scenes of nature and society.

King Rama V continued the modernization and westernization of Rattanakosin art, as he traveled to Europe and brought back new ideas and materials. He commissioned many buildings that combined Thai and European styles, such as the Ananta Samakhom Throne Hall and the Vimanmek Mansion and mixed-style such as Chakri Maha Prasat Throne Hall. He also supported the production of Benjarong, a type of porcelain with colorful patterns that had previously been imported from China with Thai patterns but later began to be produced locally.

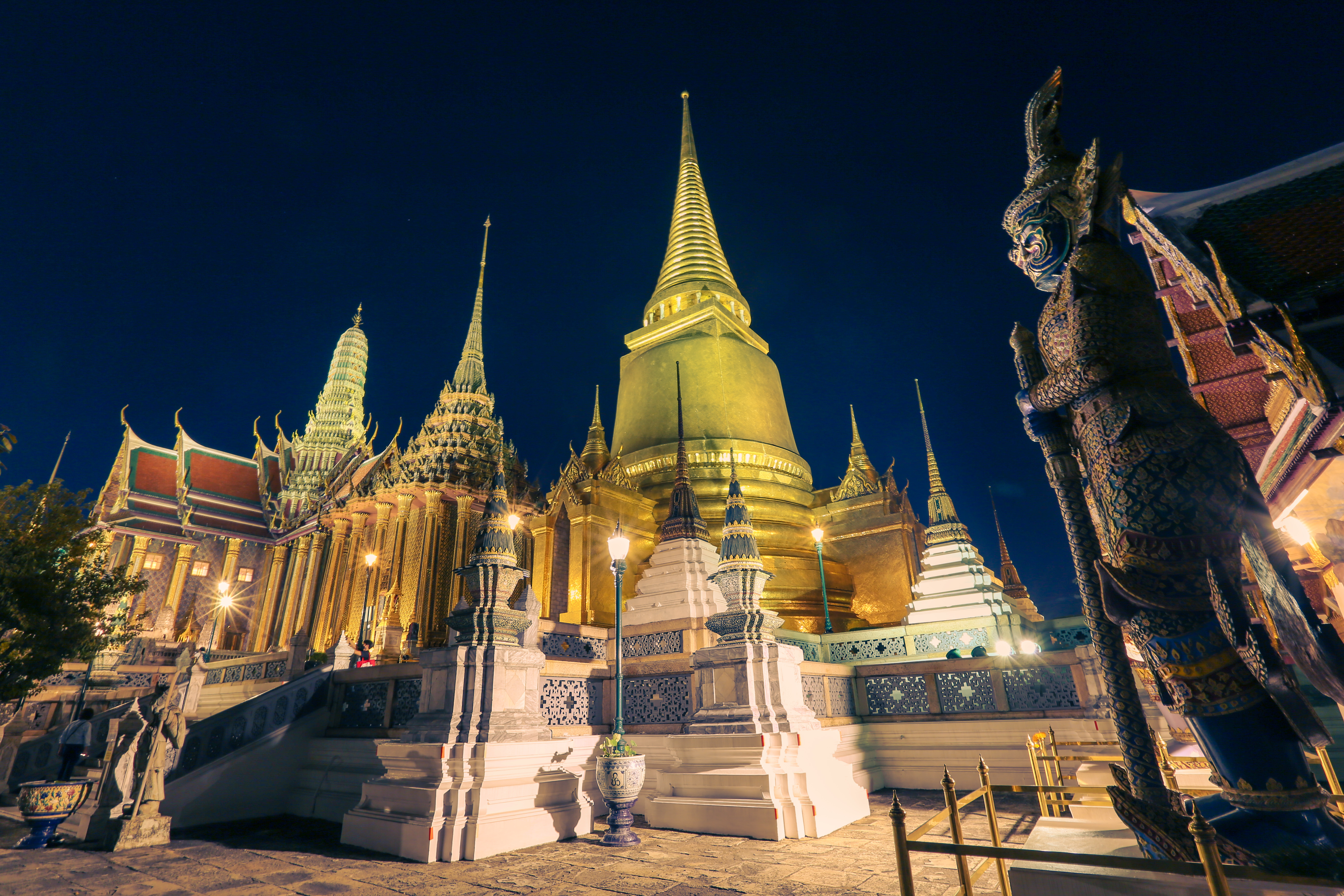
Wat Phra Kaew

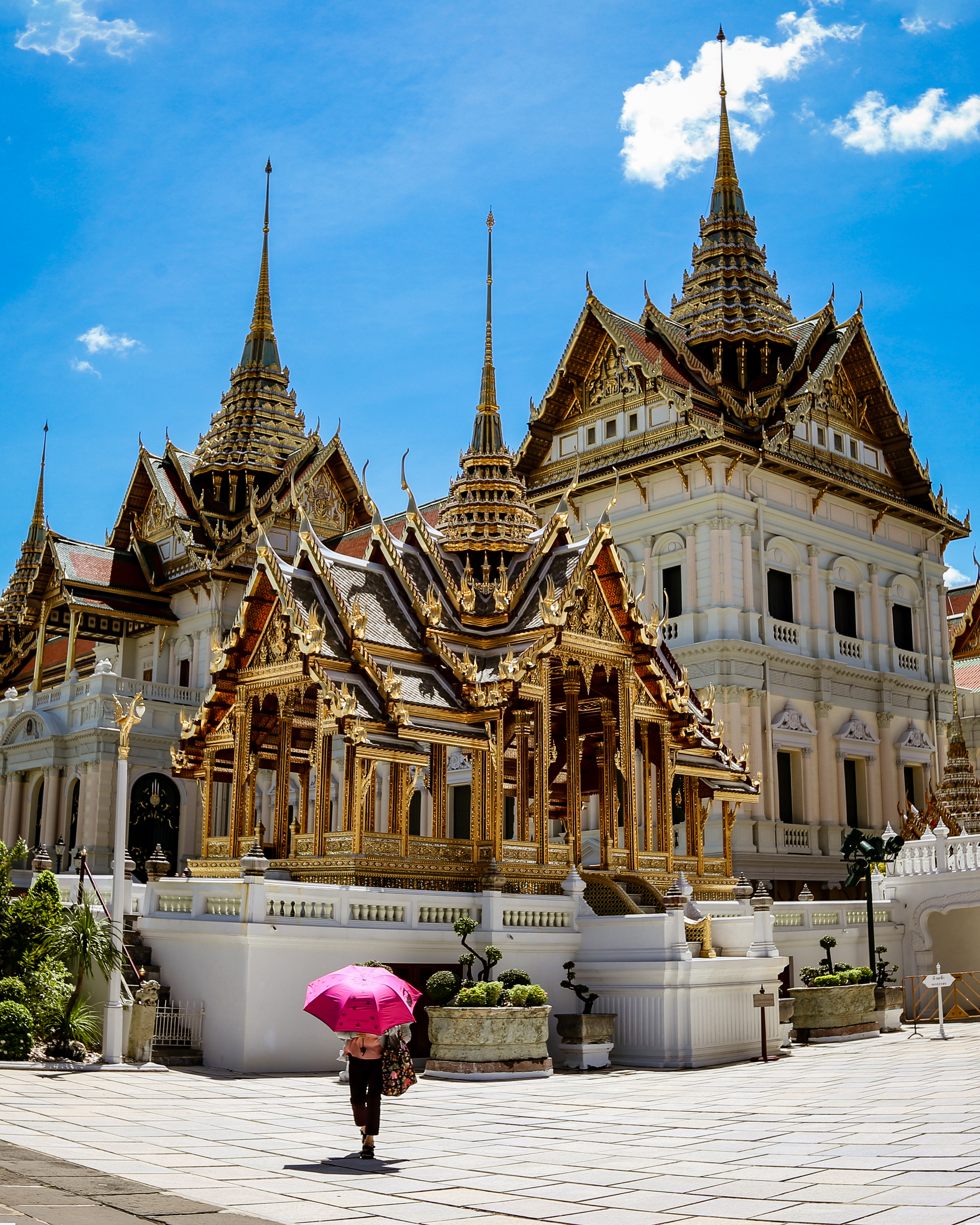
Chakri Maha Prasat Throne Hall

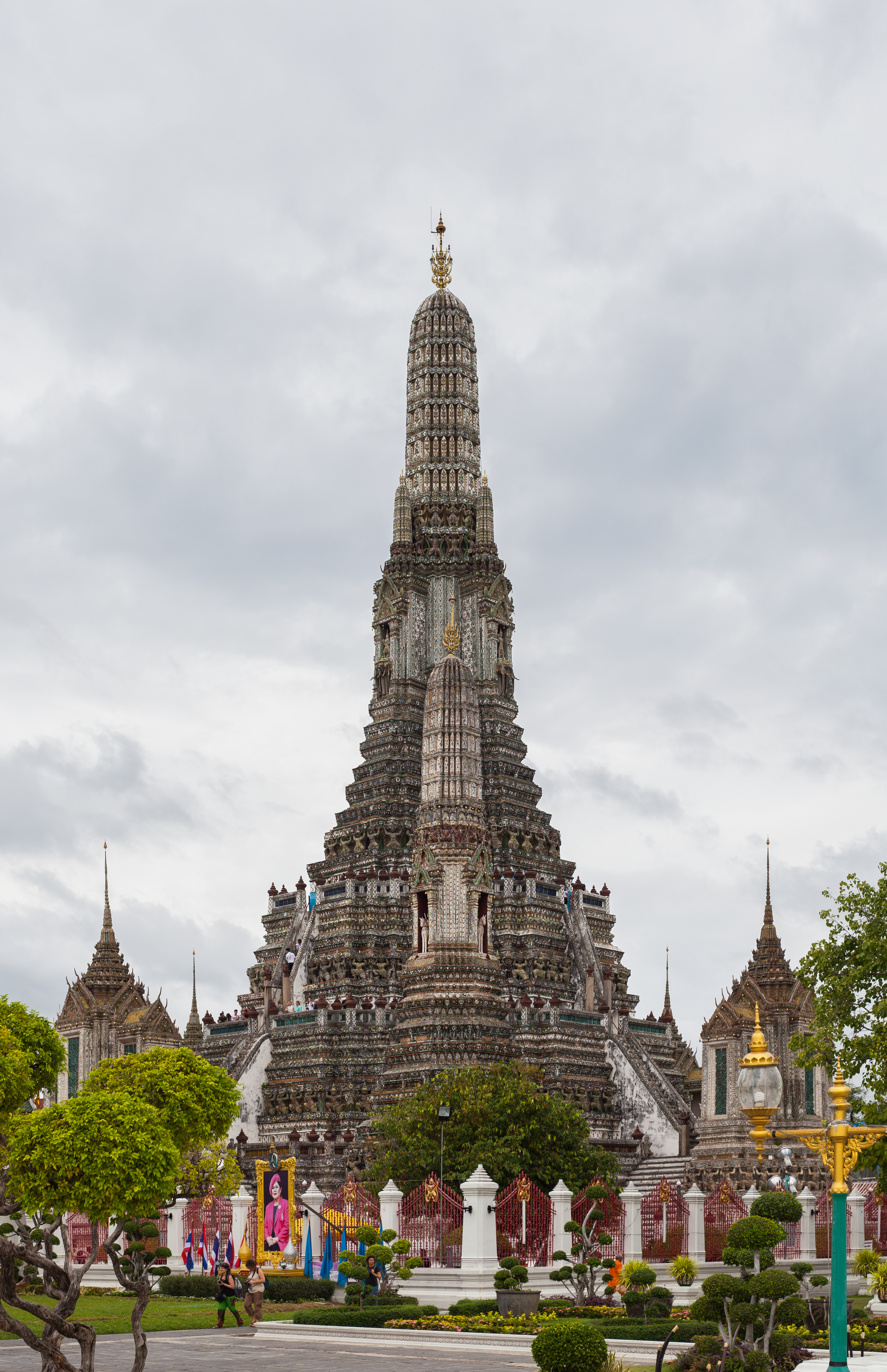
Wat Arun

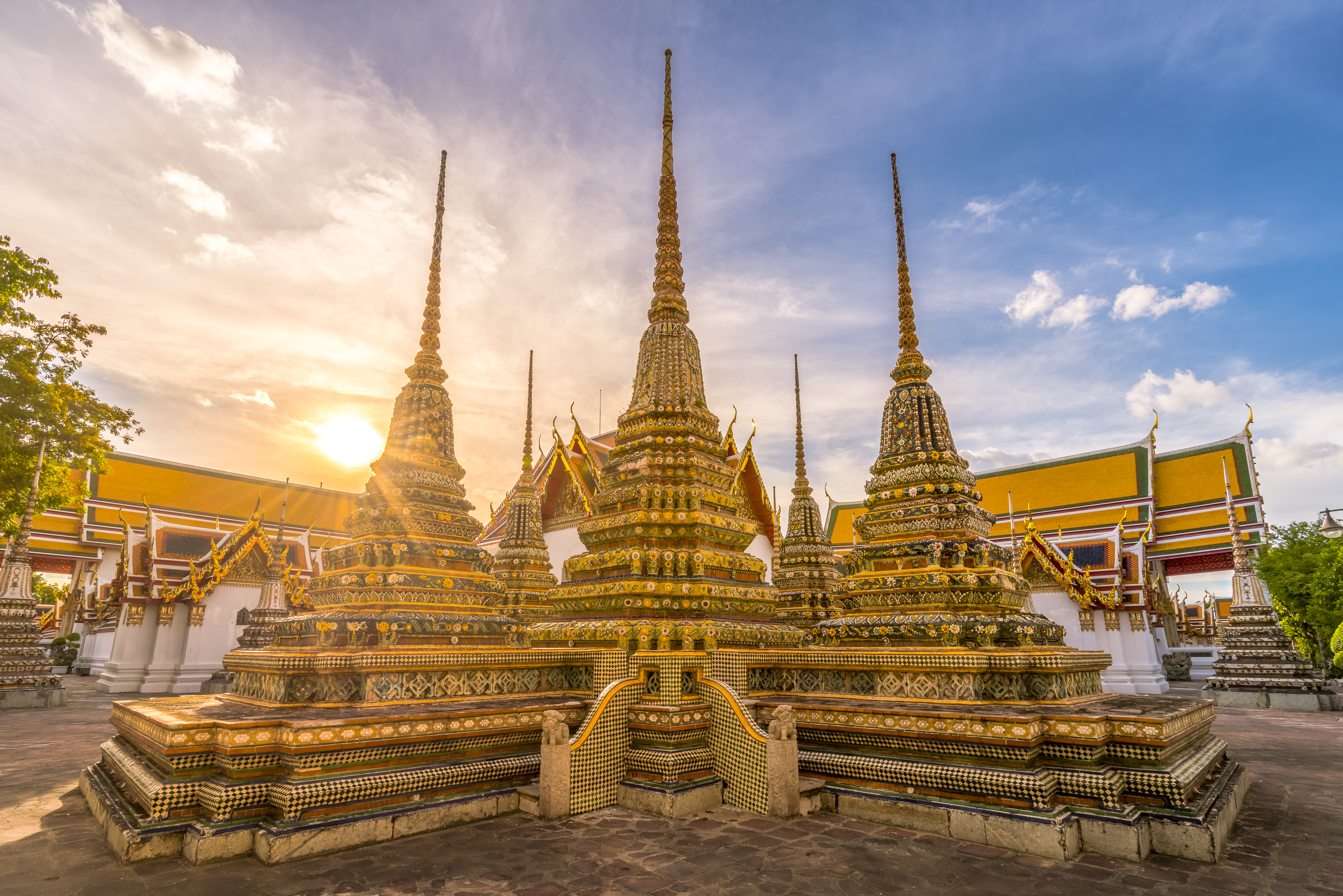
Wat Pho

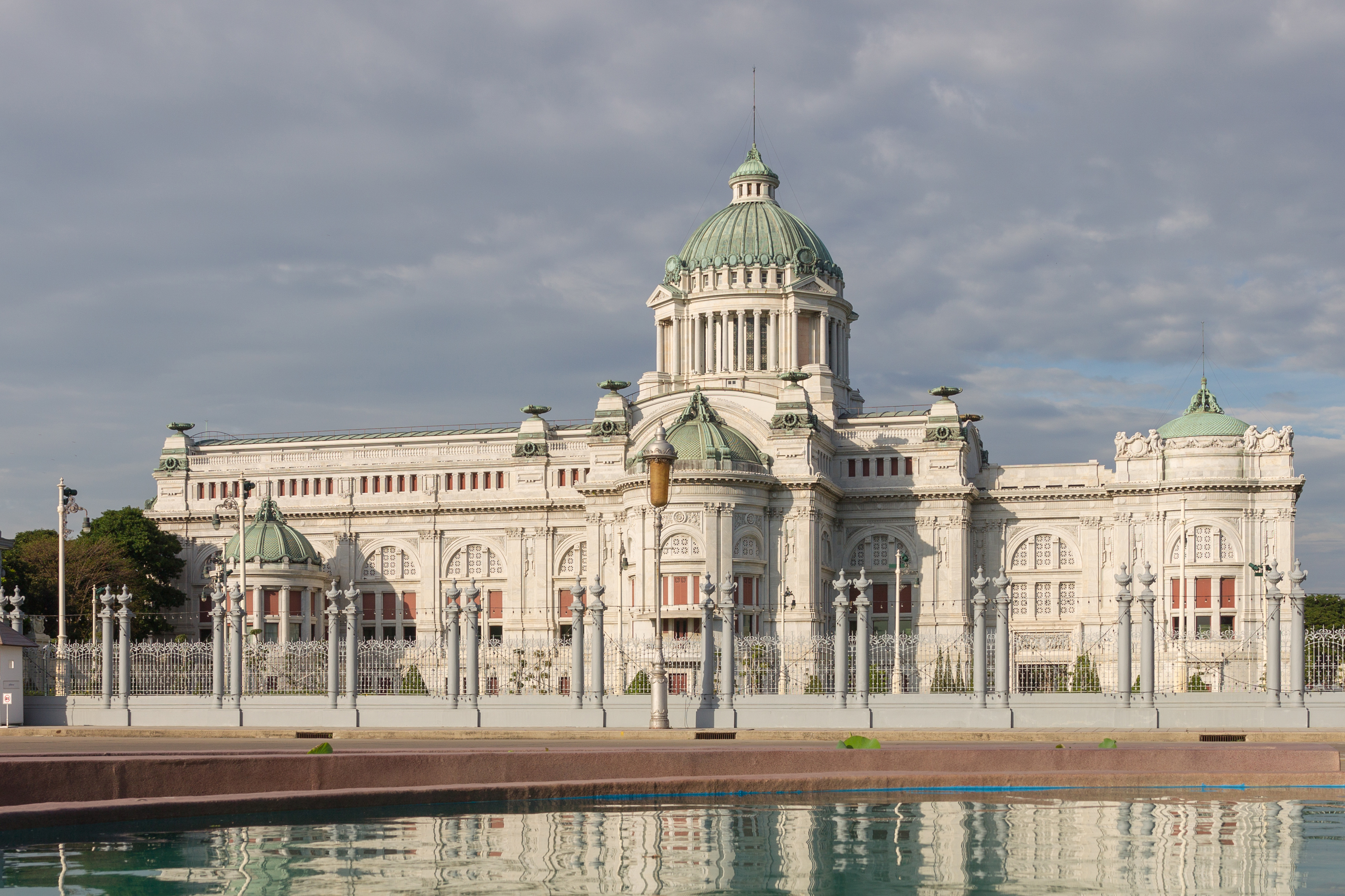
Ananta Samakhom Throne Hall

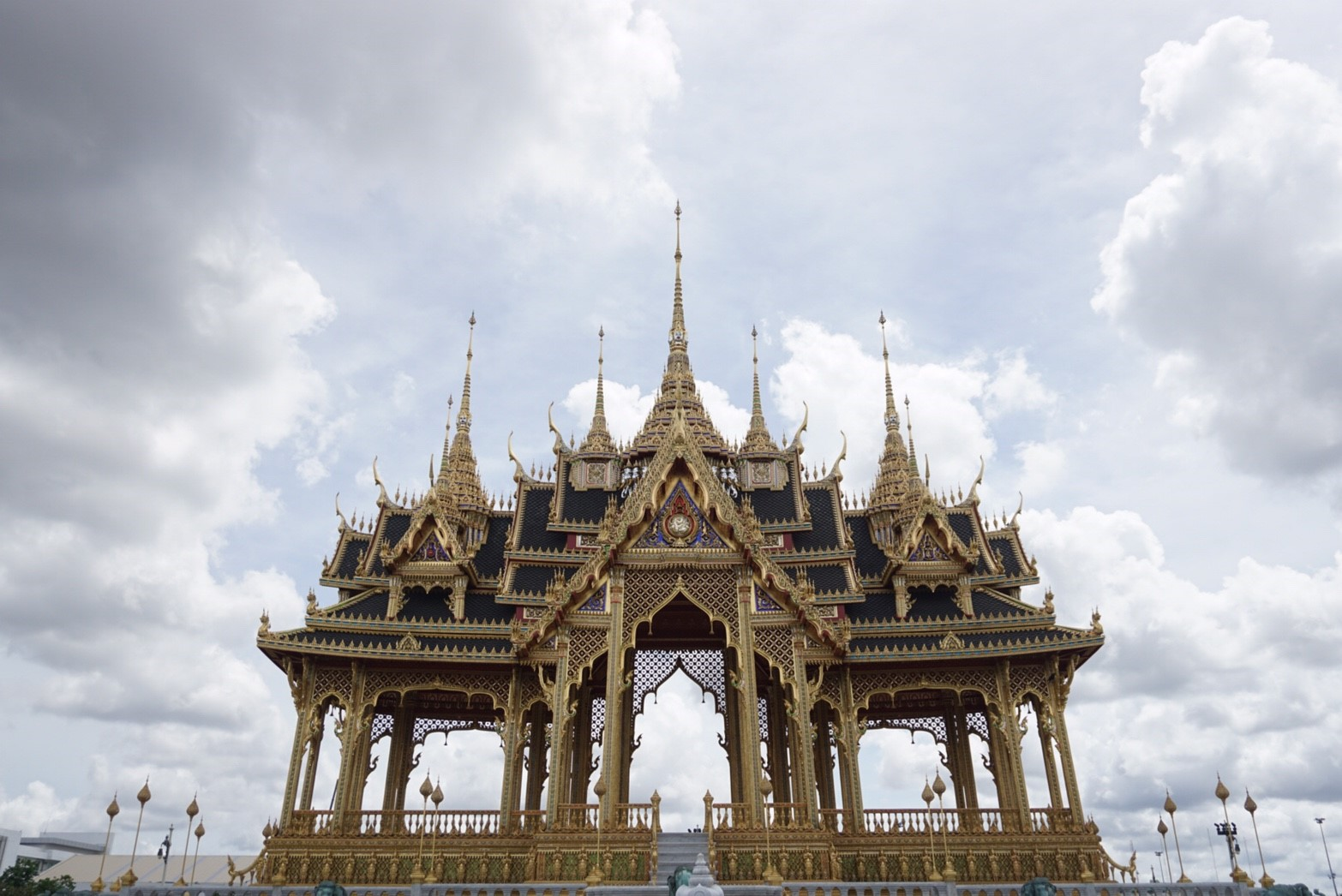
Memorial Crowns of the Auspice

==== Contemporary art ====
Contemporary Thai art emerged in the 1990s, blending old and new Thai cultural features with a diverse color-palette and patterns to create modern and appealing art. However, its roots can be traced back to Khrua In Khong, who in the 1850s and 1860s became the first Thai artist to adopt in his paintings the Western realist style, which added more depth and realism to his works.

Silpa Bhirasri, an Italian sculptor who came to Thailand in 1923 and founded the School of Fine Arts, which later became Silpakorn University, played a pivotal role in introducing modern art concepts and techniques to Thai artists and students. He taught them perspective, anatomy, composition, and color theory, and established the National Art Exhibition in 1949, providing a platform to showcase and promote Thai art. Silpa Bhirasri's famous sculptures and paintings reflected his artistic vision and appreciation of Thai culture and history, making him widely regarded as the father of Thai contemporary art.

Silpa Bhirasri's influence can be seen in the works of Fua Haripitak and Sawasdi Tantisuk, who were Thailand's avant-gardes in the 1950s and 1960s. These artists challenged the conventional norms and expectations of Thai art by creating abstract and expressive works that explored their personal feelings and experiences. They used bold colors, shapes, and textures to convey their emotions and ideas, incorporating elements of Thai culture and spirituality – such as Buddhist symbols, folk motifs, and astrological signs – into their works. Their trailblazing efforts paved the way for many more artists of later generations, such as Damrong Wong-Upraj, Manit Poo-Aree, Pichai Nirand, and Anant Panin, to experiment with new forms and styles of expression.

In the mid-1990s, a group of artists created the Chiang Mai Social Installation, which brought art and performance out of the traditional gallery setting and into the streets of Chiang Mai. The biannual art exchange program Womanifesto, started in 1997, focuses on Thai and international women artists and on creating networks between urban and rural communities.

The Bangkok Art Biennale, launched in 2018, provides a platform for artists to showcase their work on an international stage. These developments reflect a growing interest in Thai contemporary art and the increasing willingness of artists to experiment with new forms of expression

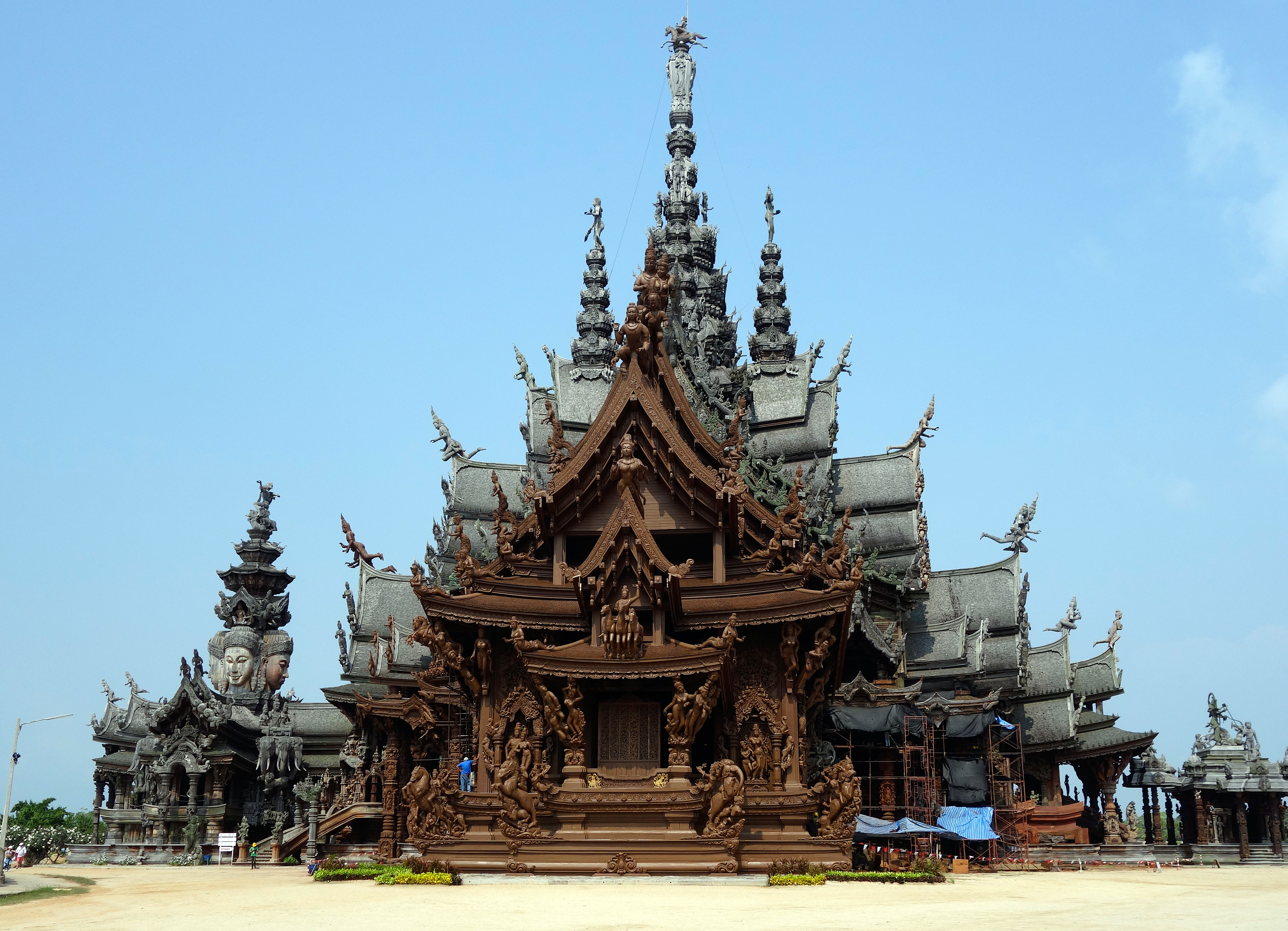
Sanctuary of Truth

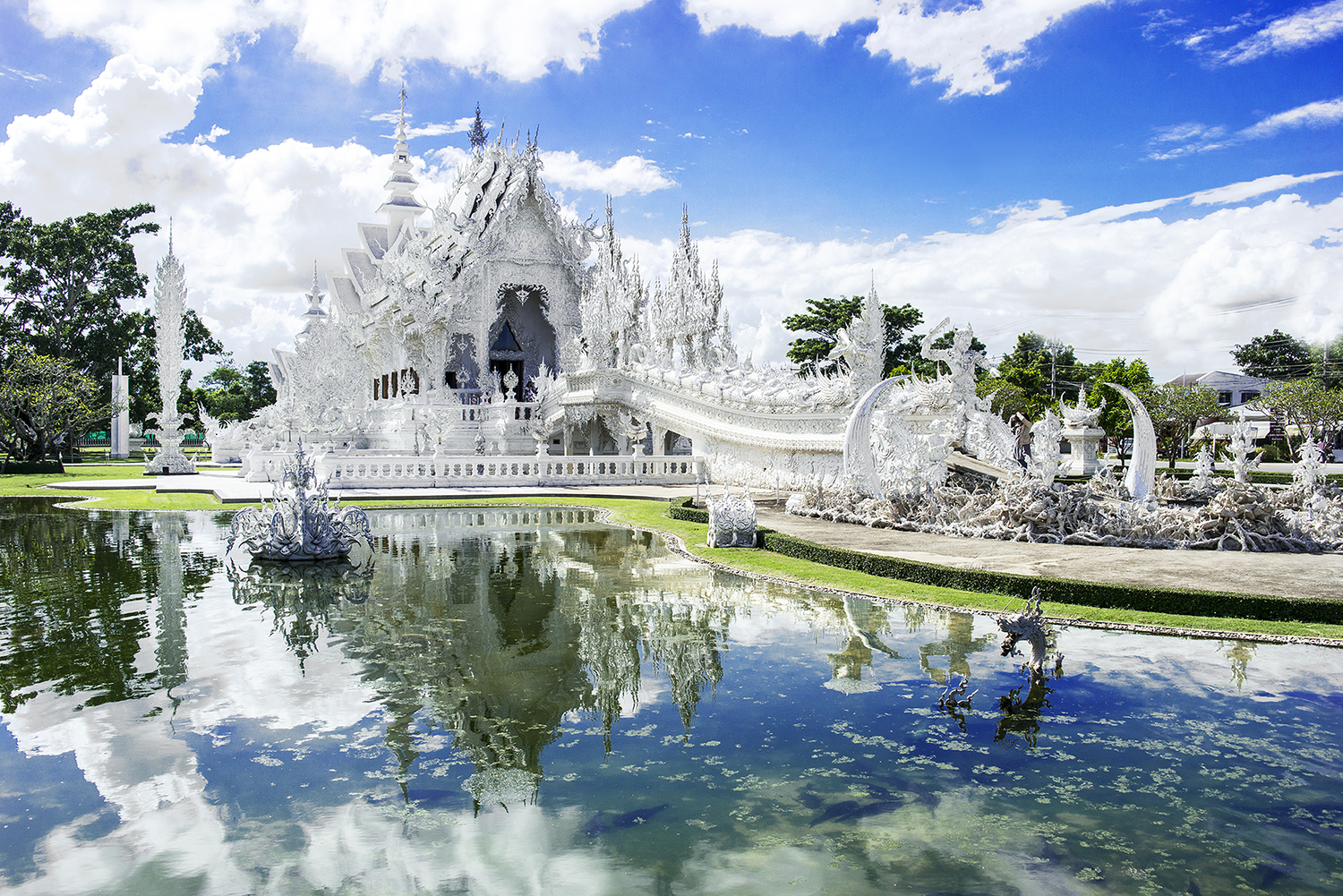
Wat Rong Khun

== Visual arts ==
=== Painting ===
==== Traditional ====
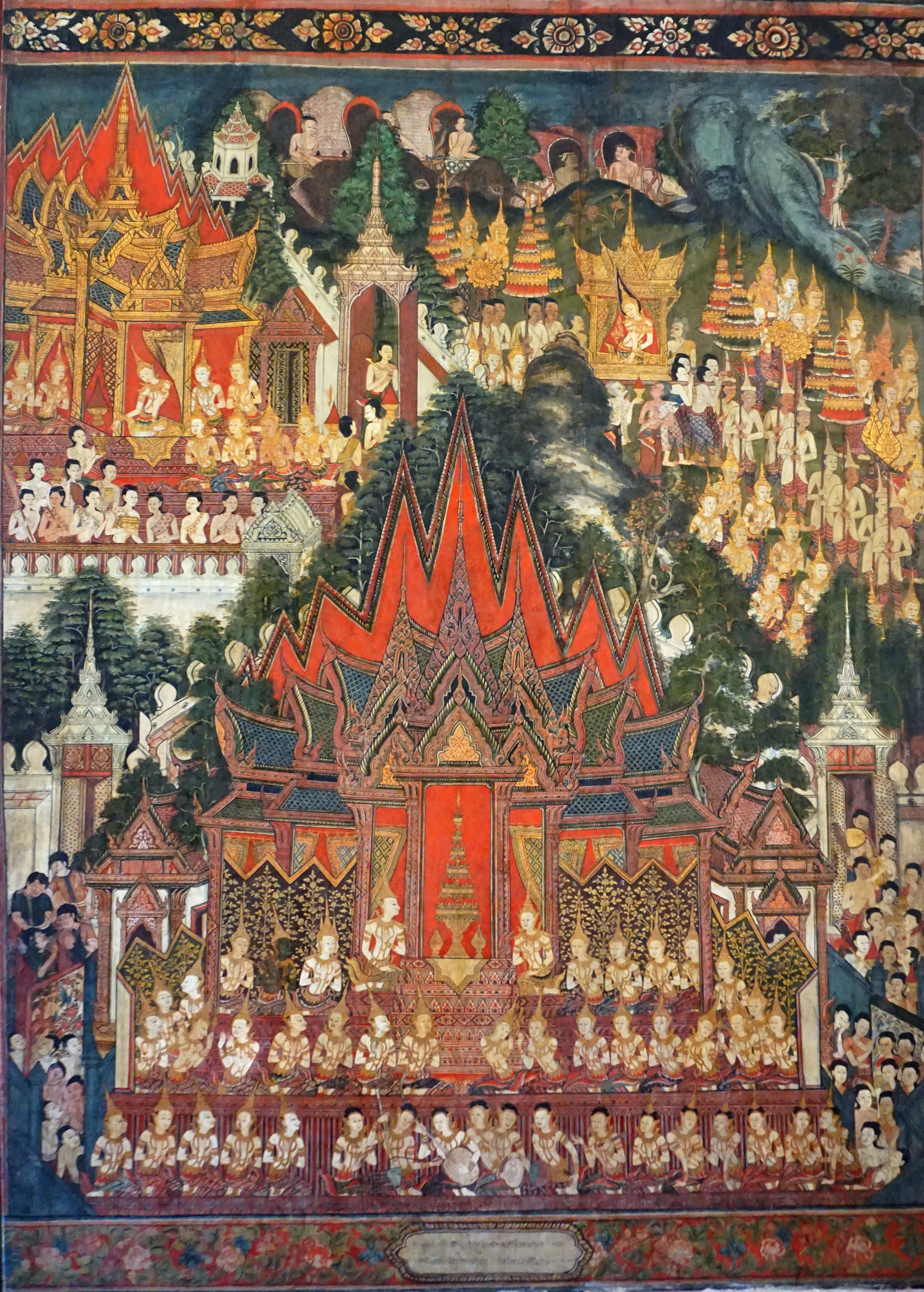
The mural painting at Phra Thinang Phuttai Sawan depicts the marriage of King Suddhodana and Queen Maya.

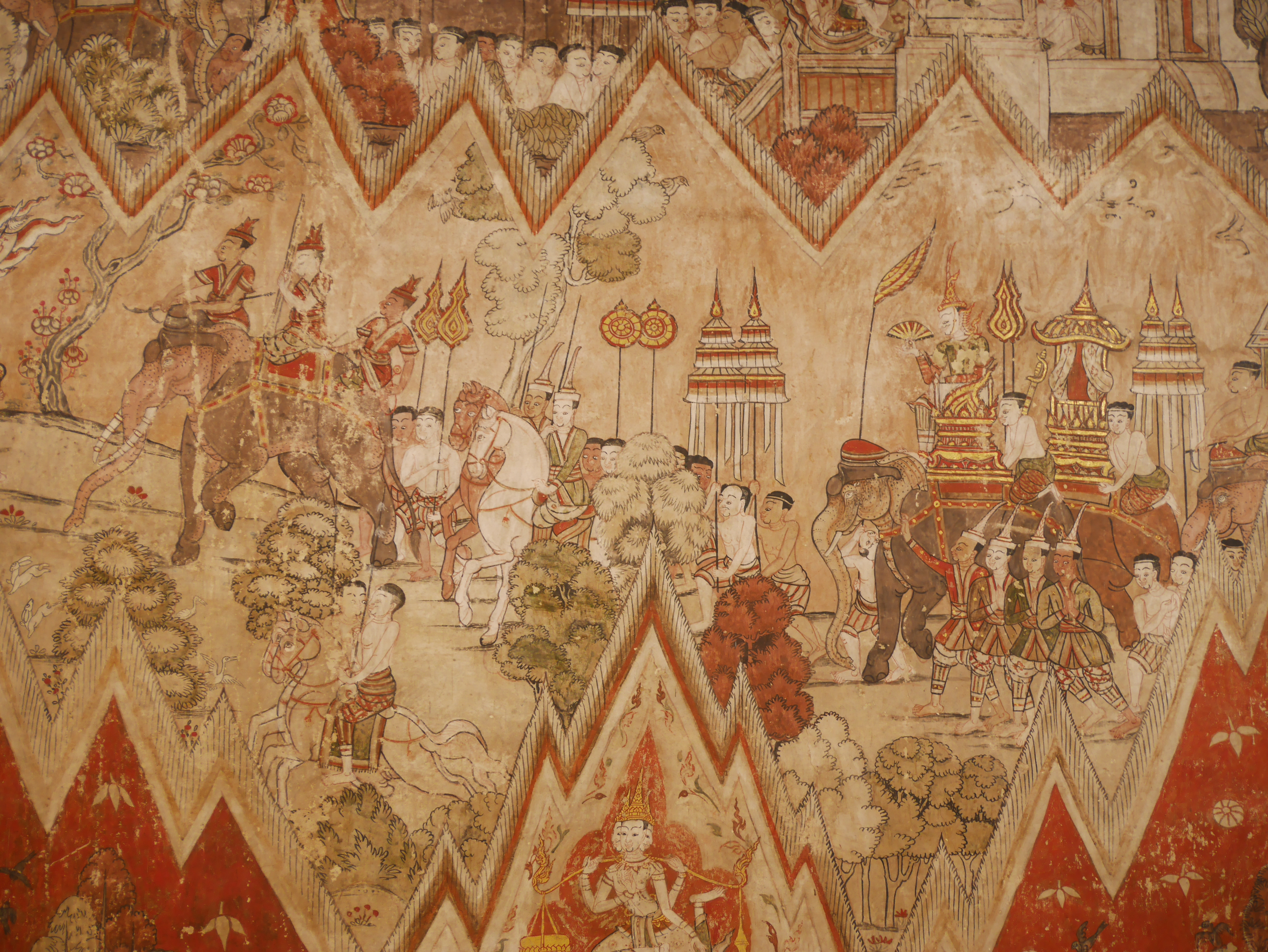
The mural painting at Wat Chong Nonsi are divided into sections using a technique called "Sinthao".

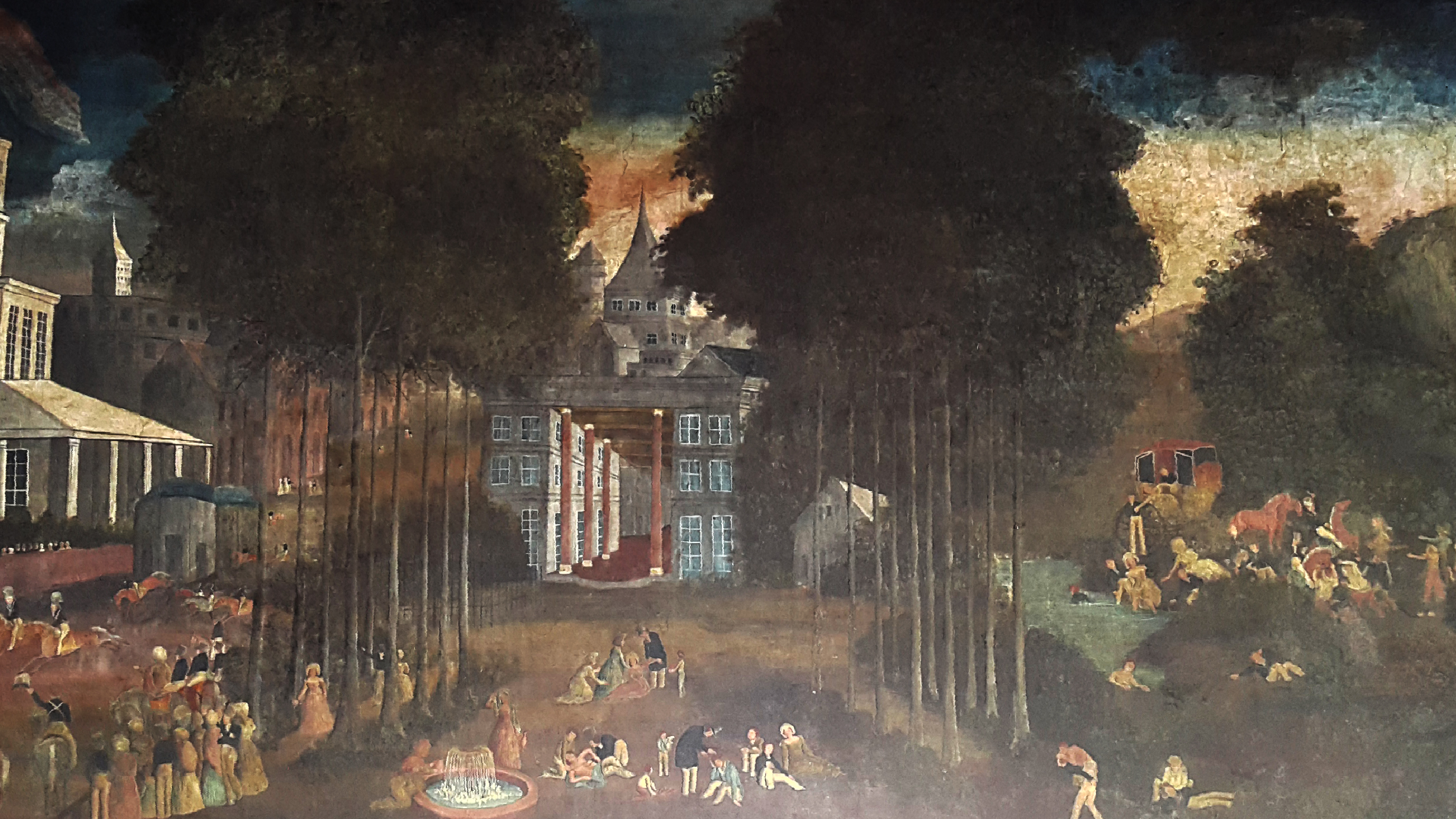
Mural painting at the Temple of Wat Borom Niwat by Khrua In Khong

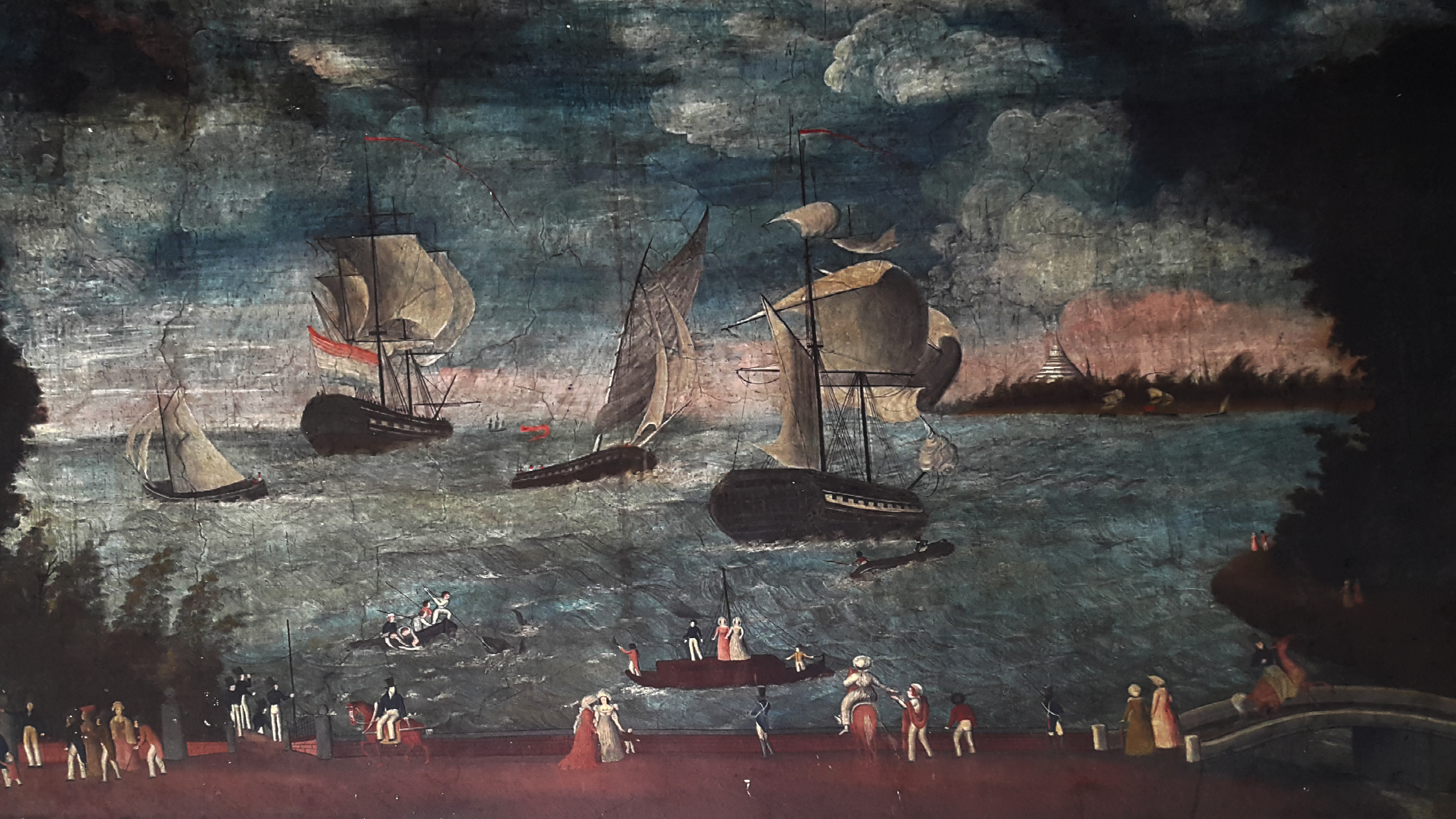
Another example of mural painting influenced by Western-style made by Khrua In Khong.

Traditional Thai painting is an ancient art form that has been passed down through generations in Thailand. The art form evolved through the Sukhothai, Ayutthaya, and Rattanakosin periods, with each era contributing unique elements to the style. The paintings typically feature flat images with lines as the main boundaries, and use secondary elements such as trees, mountains, streams, and rocks as dividing events or areas of the image. The use of color is flat paint and does not show shadows. Natural colors derived from earth elements, minerals, rocks, metals, plants, and some parts of animals are used in traditional Thai painting. The colors are often monochromatic, but there are also five-color variations called benjarong.

During the Sukhothai and Ayutthaya periods, traditional Thai painting evolved and was influenced by elements of the culture, including monochromatic and various colors. The paintings were found at various locations such as the ubosot, prang, viharn, sermon hall, ho trai, kuti, dharma cabinet, samut khoi, and phra bat. Ayutthaya period has more surviving examples of paintings, with many found in the form of murals on temple walls featuring Buddhism-related subjects such as history of the Buddha, Mahanipata Jataka, and Thep Chumnum.

In the Rattanakosin period traditional Thai painting was inspired by the events of the country, life, society, traditions, costumes, houses, temples, castles, palaces, nature, and various animals. Portraits and architecture stand out in groups, using strong colors and strongly contrasting opposite colors. The contrasting colors are balanced and harmonized. The composition of the picture often features the Tri Bhum image behind the principal Buddha image and a picture telling the story of the Lord Buddha and the Jataka tales on the side. Traditional Thai painting from this period is characterized by a heavy dark background and a heavy use of gold leaf.

From the end of the reign of King Rama III, the influence of Western painting began to flow into Thailand. This resulted in a modification of traditional Thai painting styles in various Buddhist places. The original flat images were transformed into deep, three-dimensional images that look more realistic, influenced by the Western style of painting. An important painter during the reign of King Rama IV was Khrua In Khong. He was one of the first Thai painters to experiment with the Western style of painting while maintaining the traditional Thai art form.

Many of the images in traditional Thai painting tell stories of the Lord Buddha, the Jataka tales, or important events in Thai history. The paintings often feature intricate details and designs that are specific to Thai culture, such as the traditional Thai costumes and architecture. Traditional Thai painting is still practiced today, with modern artists combining the traditional art form with contemporary techniques and styles.

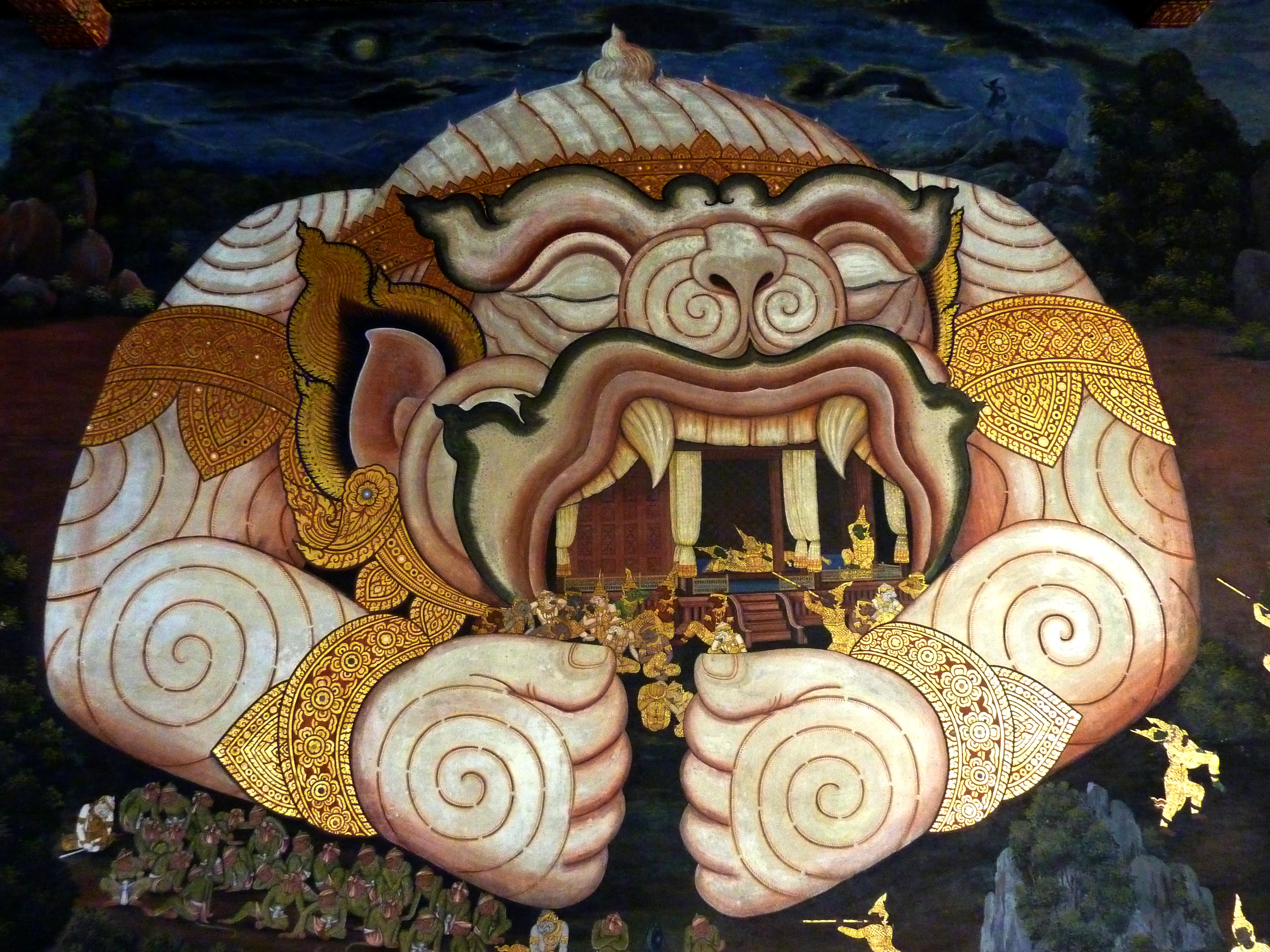
The mural painting at Wat Phra Kaew depicts a scene from the Ramakien, an epic Thai poem, where Hanuman expands his gigantic body to protect Phra Ram's tabernacle.

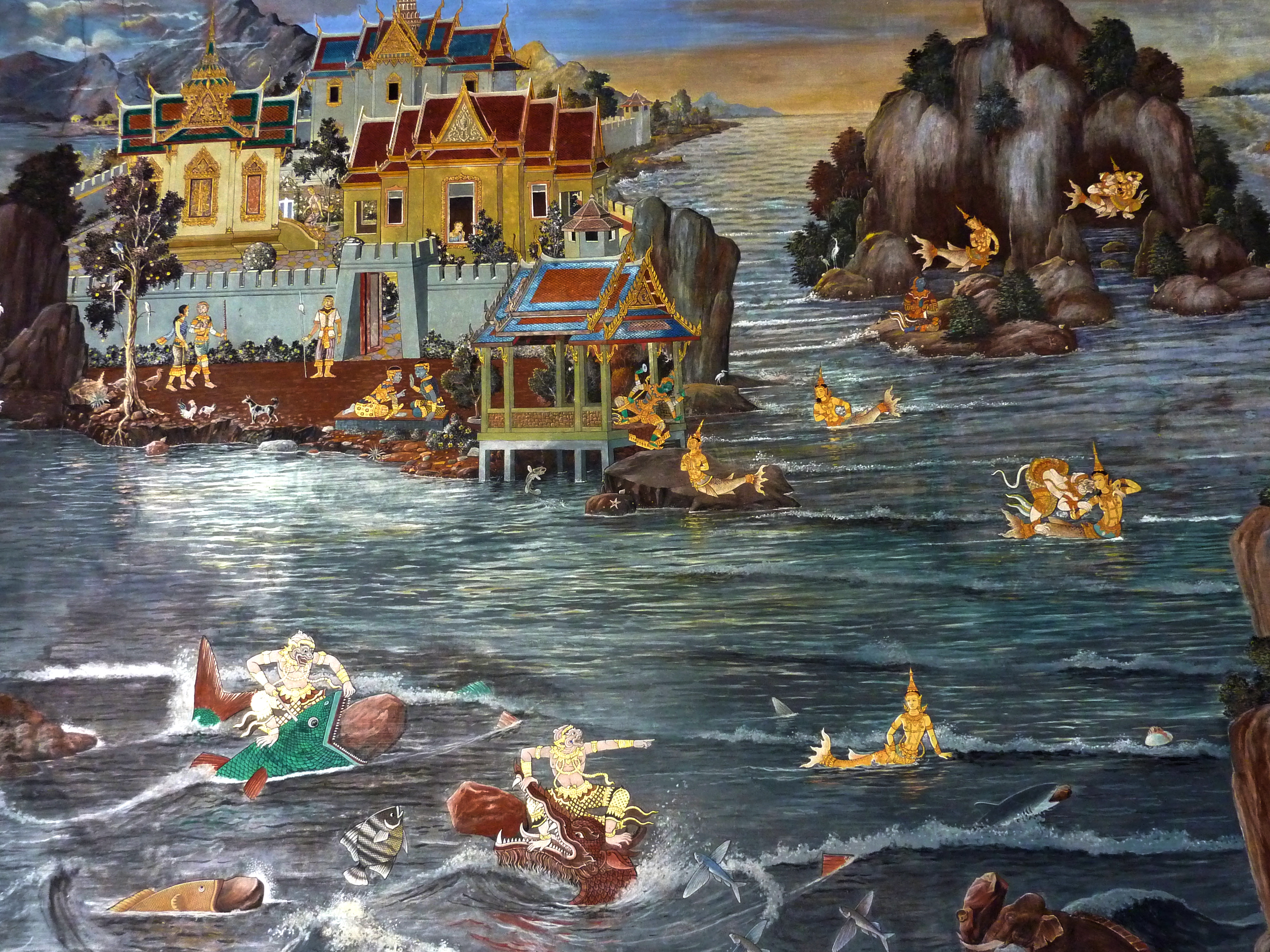
The mural painting at Wat Phra Kaew depicts Hanuman and the mermaid-like creature Suvannamaccha.

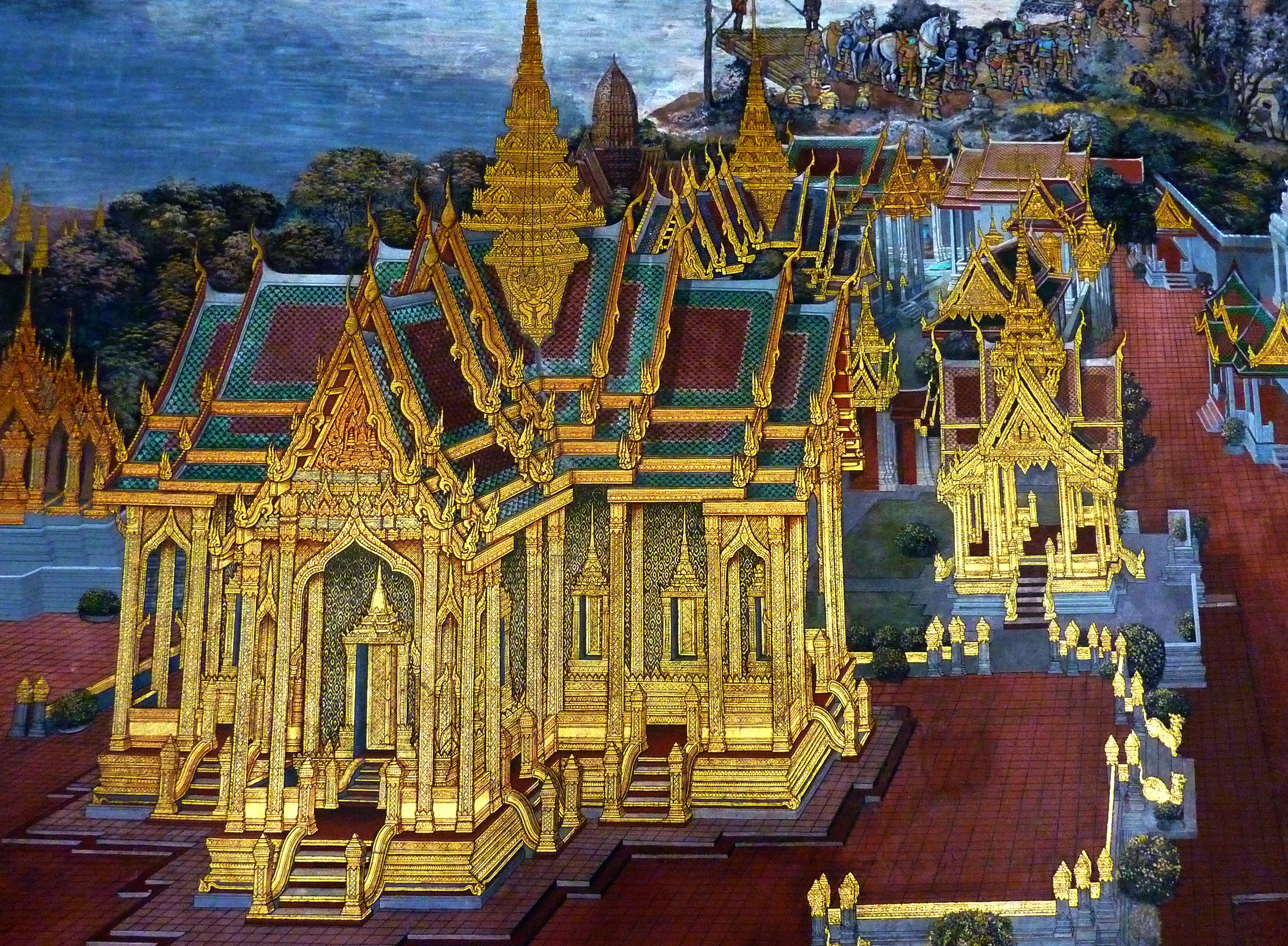
This mural painting depicts the traditional Thai architecture of Wat Phra Kaew.

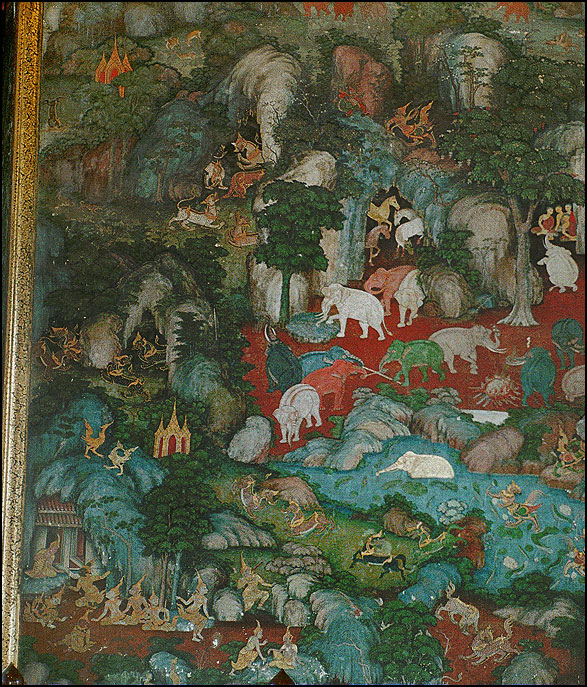
The Himaphan mural paintings depict mythical animal creatures commonly found in the mythical Himaphan forest of Thai folklore.

==== Contemporary ====
One of the pioneers of modern Thai painting is Khrua In Khong, who is highly regarded for his expressive and atmospheric works that break free from traditional painting rules. His art emphasizes the value of painting beyond just theoretical reasons, inspiring future generations of Thai artists to create unique and innovative works. Starting from 1957, the influence of European art movements such as Impressionism, Cubism, and Surrealism became more evident in the works of Thai painters, including Fua Haripitak, Sawat Tantisuk, Kiettisak Chanonnart, Ithipol Thangchalok, Tuan Thirapichit, and Decha Warachoon.

=== Sculpture ===
Thai sculpture is a diverse and intricate art form that encompasses various styles and techniques, from the shallow depths of bas relief to the three-dimensional forms of high relief and floating round reliefs, and is often used for religious purposes as well as for decorative and functional objects such as pottery.

==== Wood carving ====
Wood is one of the most commonly available materials in tropical regions. In Thailand, the most commonly used woods for carving are teak, takhian, rosewood, padu, and makha. Wood carving has been a traditional craft in Thailand for centuries, with skilled artisans creating a wide variety of objects, including decorative items and functional pieces such as doors, windows, Buddha images, and decorative patterns for buildings and furniture.

==== Stone carving ====
Thai sculpture almost exclusively depicts images of the Buddha, being very similar with the other styles from Southeast Asia, such as Khmer. Most of the sculptures depict Buddha. An exception is the dvarapala.

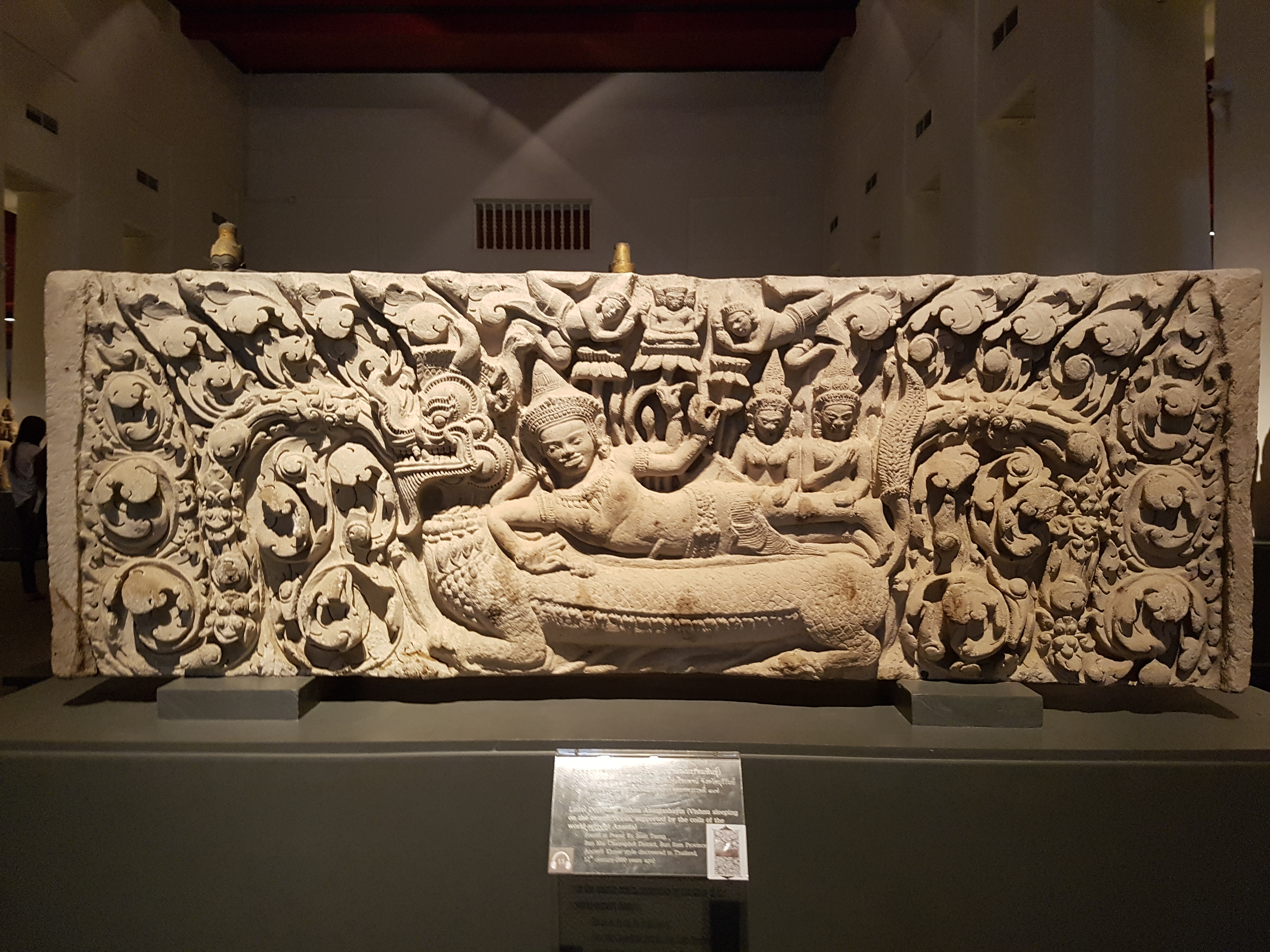
Lintel depicting the Hindu god Nārāyaṇa sleeping upon the serpent Śeṣa in the middle of the Milky Ocean; around 12th century; obtained from the Ku Suan Taeng Temple (Ban Mai Chaiyaphot District, Buri Ram Province); Bangkok National Museum

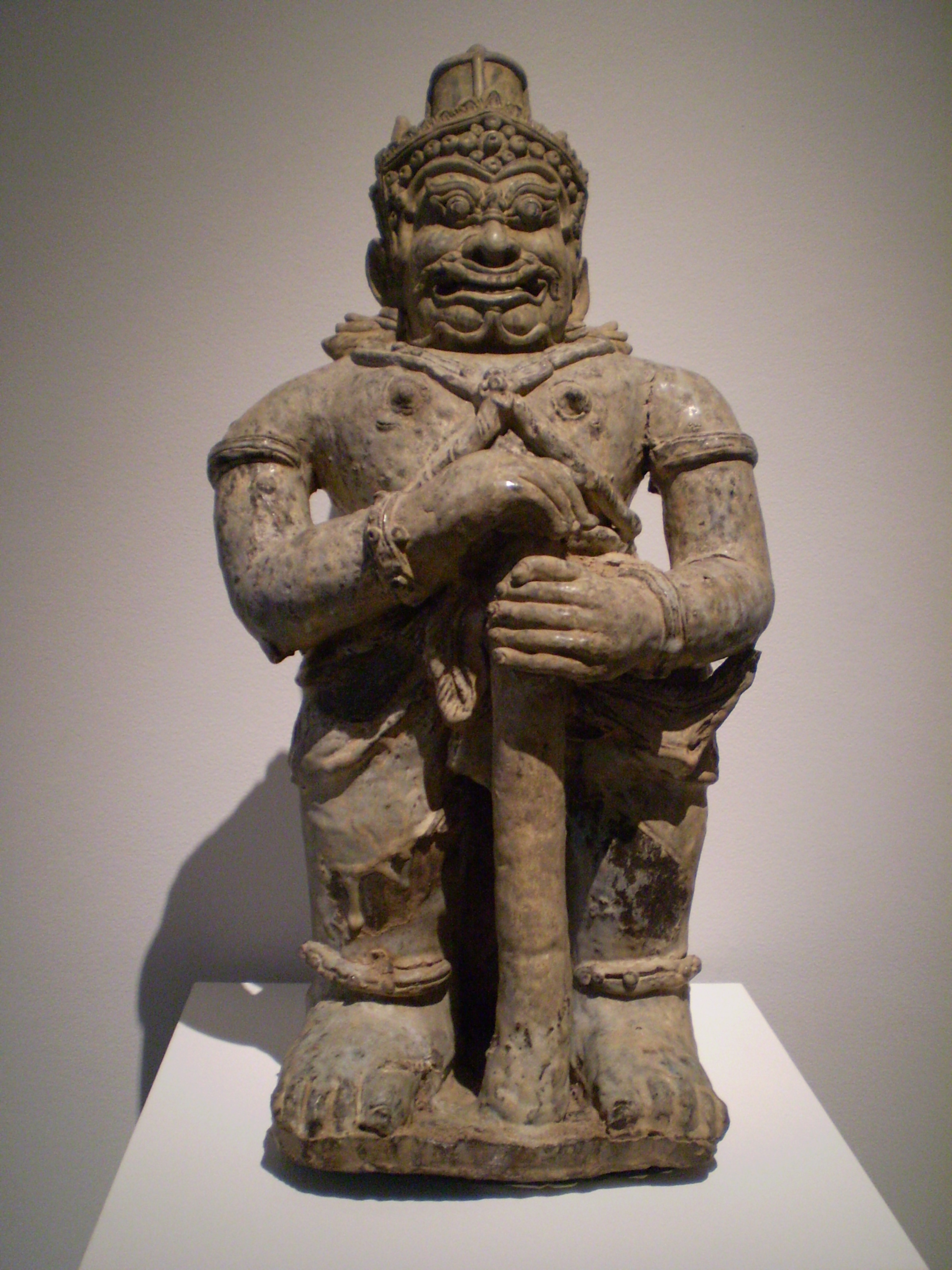
Guardian figure (dvarapala); 15th century; glazed stoneware; Harn Museum of Art (Florida, USA)

== Crafts and decorative arts ==
Chang Sip Mu refers to ten different types of craftsmen highly respected in Thai culture. The term "Chang" means a skilled artisan or technician, while "Sip Mu" means ten groups. This tradition dates back to the Ayutthaya period, where there were even more groups of craftsmen. Each group has a specific skill set, including drawing and painting, carving, engraving, turning, casting, molding and sculpting, model building, lacquering, metal beating, and plastering. For centuries, these craftsmen have passed down their skills through generations. Their works of art include Buddha images, lacquerware, metalwork, and decorative patterns.

=== Basketry ===
Wicker weaving has been an integral part of Thailand's handicraft tradition for centuries. Thai craftsmen have honed their skills in creating wicker products made from various materials such as bamboo, rattan, palm leaves, coconut leaf, krajood leaf, lipao, and other plant-based materials. These products are commonly found in Thai households and range from furniture pieces like chairs and tables to smaller items like baskets, trays, lamps, and other. The craft is typically passed down through families and small workshops, where the next generation of craftsmen learns the techniques and intricacies of wicker weaving.

=== Ceramics ===
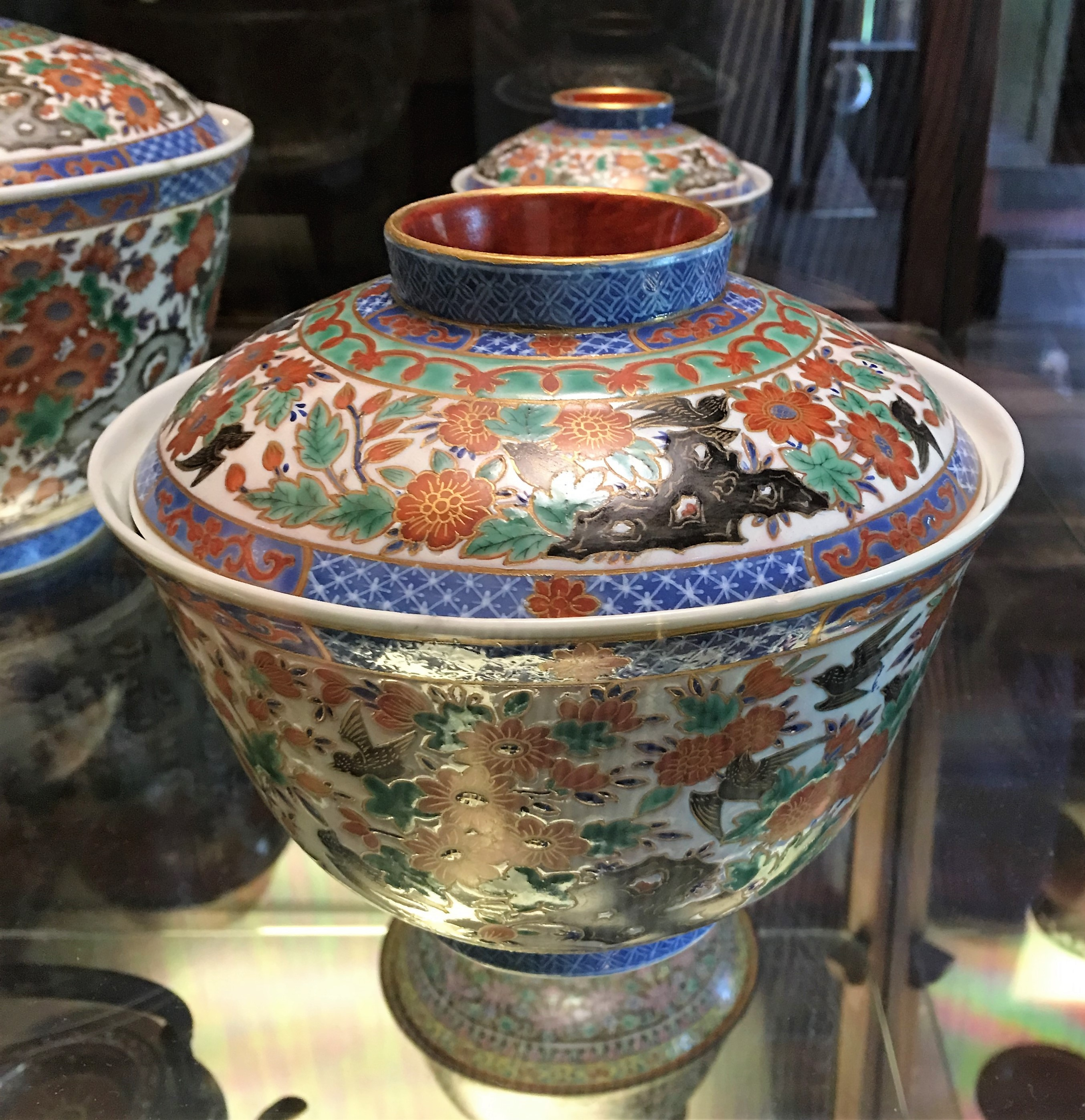

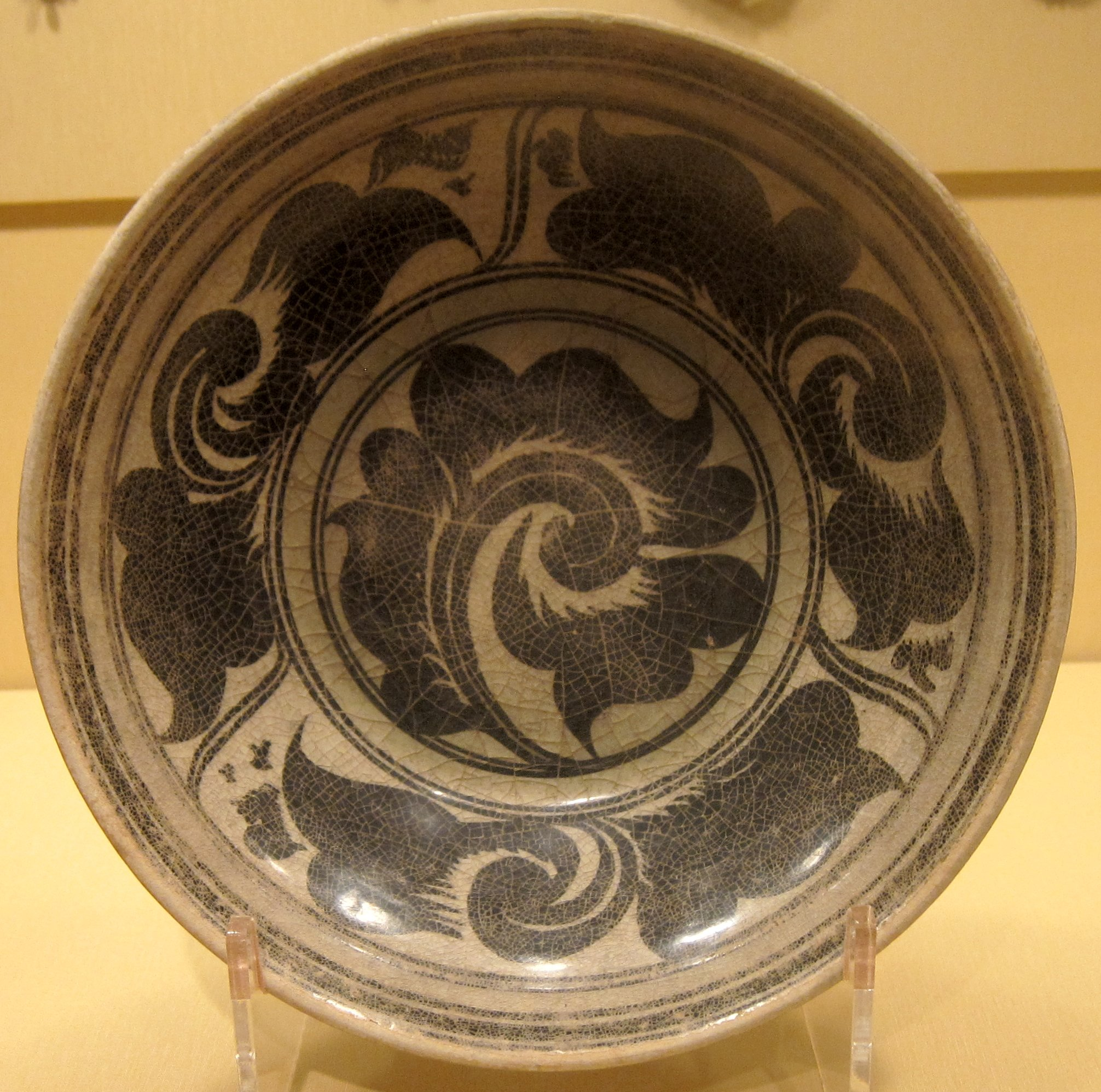

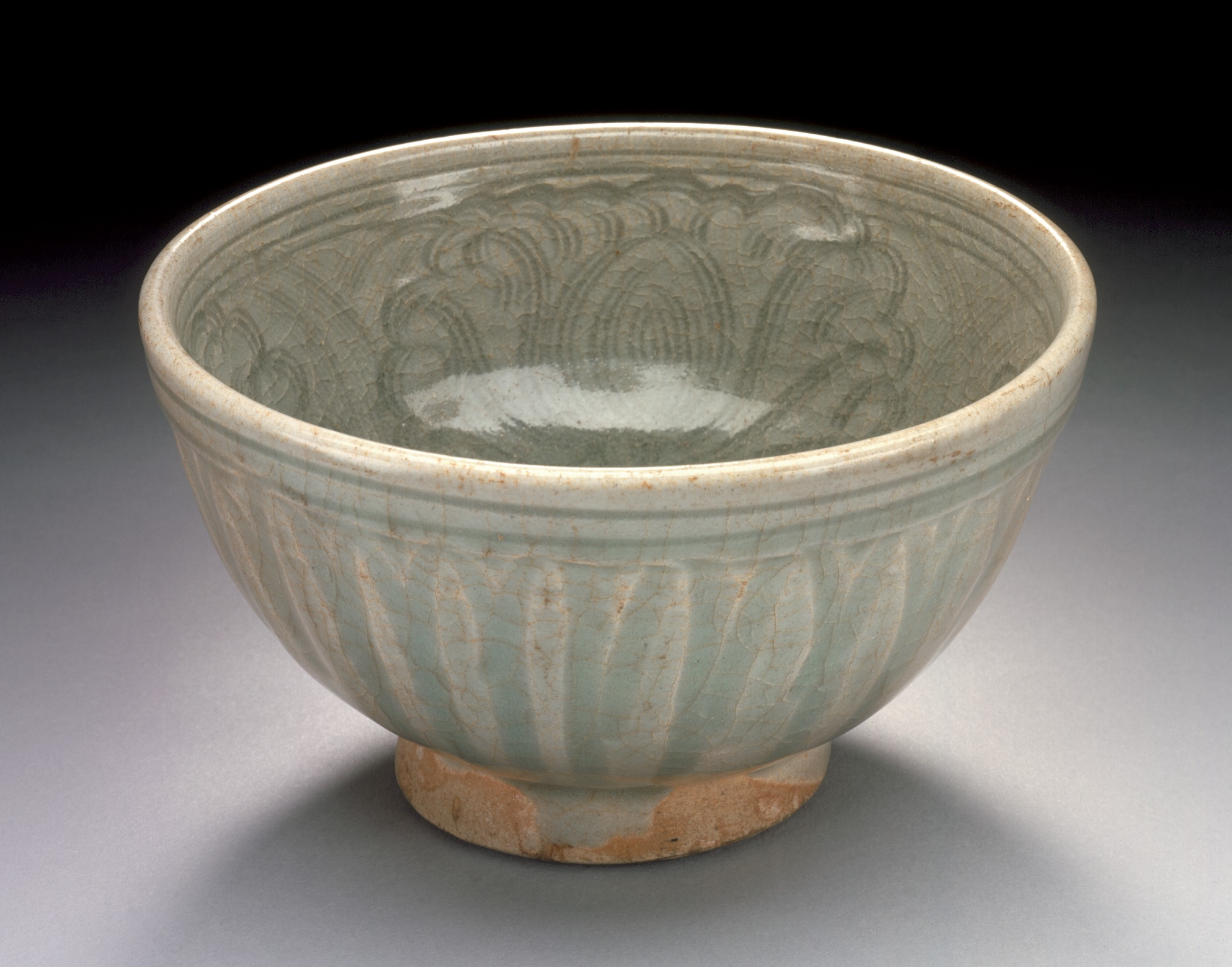

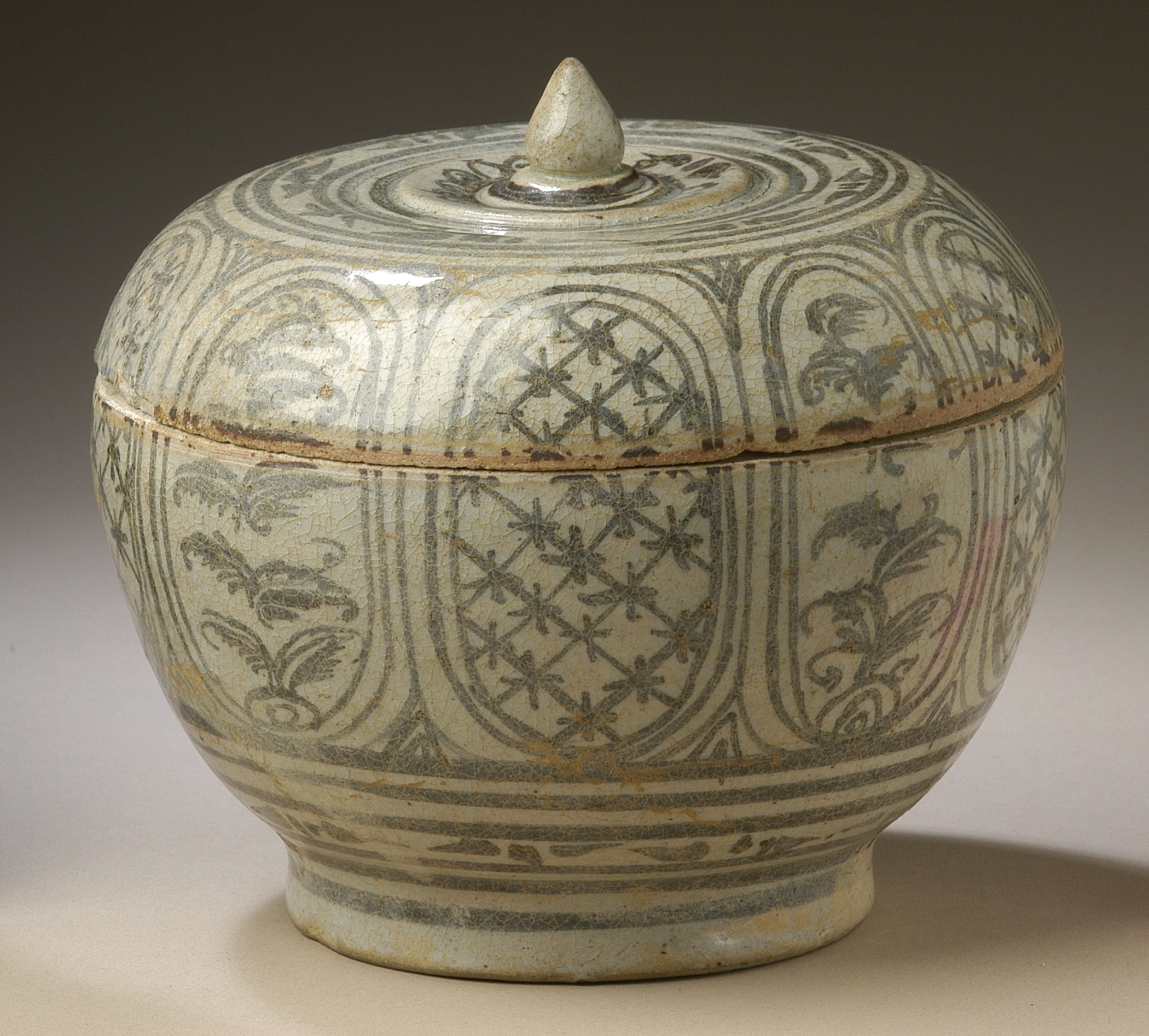

=== Glass blowing ===
Glass blowing has evolved over time, with the introduction of new techniques to enhance the beauty and artistic value of the work. Sandblasting is used to create a turbid surface, while gilding with gold leaves and coating with flaxseed oil are common methods to create a value-added product that is more attractive and worthy of collection. These tactics have contributed to the popularity of glass blowing as an art form, with a range of works produced in Thailand since its introduction in 1977. Today, there are training courses and institutions that produce scientific tools, making glass blowing accessible to both children and adults. The works produced vary in price and complexity, ranging from inexpensive animal figures to collectible sculptures like the mythical Royal Barge Suphannahong and other creatures.

=== Patterns and motifs ===
Patterns in Thai art and design are often inspired by nature, including plants and animals. These patterns are commonly used to adorn buildings, clothing, and household items for various occasions. Thai artists and craftspeople draw inspiration from a variety of natural elements, such as lotus flowers, garlands, smoke, incense, and candle flames, to create unique and diverse patterns. Lotuses, including the sacred lotus, double red lotus, and magnolia lotus, have served as inspiration for many of these patterns, while others have been inspired by the swaying flames.

Kranok pattern: The pattern is usually represented as a triangular shape with unequal sides or a lotus bud shape and is composed of three parts: the body, the tail, and the top. Skilled craftsmen create the intricate designs using knotting techniques. Kranok is derived from nature, based on the four elements of earth, water, wind, and fire, and must consist of the five elements of flora, which include clumps, sheaths, branches, and leaves. These elements are tied together in a pattern to form Kranok. The pattern has been widely used in Thai art, architecture, and crafts and is still celebrated today as a symbol of Thai heritage and culture.

Krajung pattern: The structure of the pattern is in the form of an equilateral triangle, resembling the petals of a lotus or sugarcane leaves. The sides are pointed and separated, as if being pulled apart. This pattern is commonly used as a decorative border, such as on traditional Thai wooden furniture or on the top of Thai architectural features.

Prajam yam pattern: The structure of the pattern is in the form of a square, resembling a four-petal flower. It is a popular decorative motif in Thai art and can be used to create continuous patterns or as individual floating flowers. The Prajam yam pattern is commonly used as a repeating motif in decorative patterns, such as on textiles, pottery, and architecture.

Phum khao bin pattern: The structure of the pattern is in the shape of a cluster of rice seeds, or the shape of a lotus bud. This pattern is often seen in Thai architecture, such as the chedi dated to the Sukhothai period.

Kap pattern: A tall pattern used to decorate or wrap around the base of poles or various rectangular shapes in architectural works. It resembles sugarcane or bamboo, and the pattern itself has protruding parts.

Nok khab and Nak khob pattern: This pattern features the face of a bird or naga with its beak covering or incorporating other patterns. The design is typically located at the joint where the stem connects to the flower or leaf, and is a common decorative element in Thai art and architecture.

=== Metalworks ===
==== Damascene ====
Damasceneware, also known as Kram in Thai, involves inlaying refined silver or gold stripes into a carved pattern on steel objects like scissors, cane heads, and royal weapons. It is believed to have been influenced by the Persians who traded with Thailand during the Ayutthaya period. The method of inlaying silver is called Kram Ngern and gold is called Kram Thong. As the weapons of troop leaders during the Ayutthaya and early Rattanakosin periods were also used by the kings, they needed to be beautifully decorated. However, as the weapons were made of iron, it was impossible to use precious stones or enamel for decoration. The only option was to use inlay work. This technique was also used for decorating the costumes of royal family members and auspicious royal articles like regalia, which symbolized regal authority.

==== Niello ====
Nielloware, also known as Thom in Thai, is a technique used to decorate silverware and goldware. The technique involves carving intricate patterns onto a metal surface and filling the grooves with a black mixture, making the pattern more visible. Historically, nielloware was used as rank decorations and was considered exclusive to the upper class. There are several categories of nielloware, including silver or black nielloware, gold nielloware, Thom Ta Thong, and Thom Chuthathut. Thom Ta Thong involves silver nielloware with gold painted on certain places, while Thom Chuthathut is an inlay technique on silver plates. The art of nielloware has been passed down through generations of artisans. To create nielloware, the artisan carves the desired pattern onto the metal surface, then applies a black mixture to the grooves, making the pattern more visible. The technique requires a steady hand and a great deal of patience to produce the intricate designs that are characteristic of nielloware.

=== Lacquerware ===
==== Lai rot nam ====
The art of Lai rot nam is a time-honored tradition in Thailand that involves using gold leaf and black lacquer to decorate various objects with intricate and delicate designs. This art form requires exceptional skill and precision to execute properly, as the gold leaf must be applied in various designs that can range from simple geometric patterns to intricate depictions of mythical creatures and scenes from Buddhist mythology. The use of black lacquer, which is made from the resin of the Rak tree, creates a contrast against the gold leaf and enhances the visual impact of the overall design.

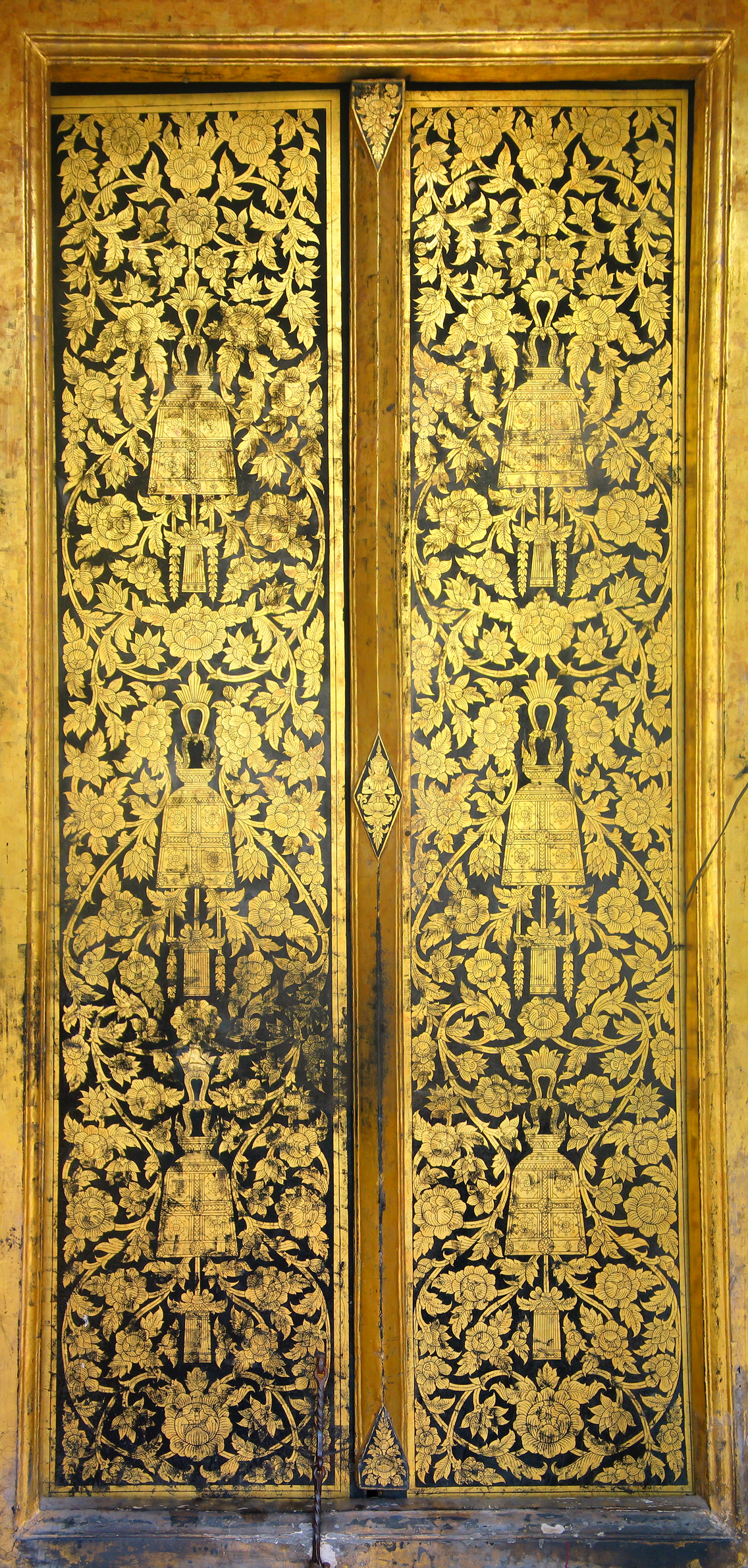

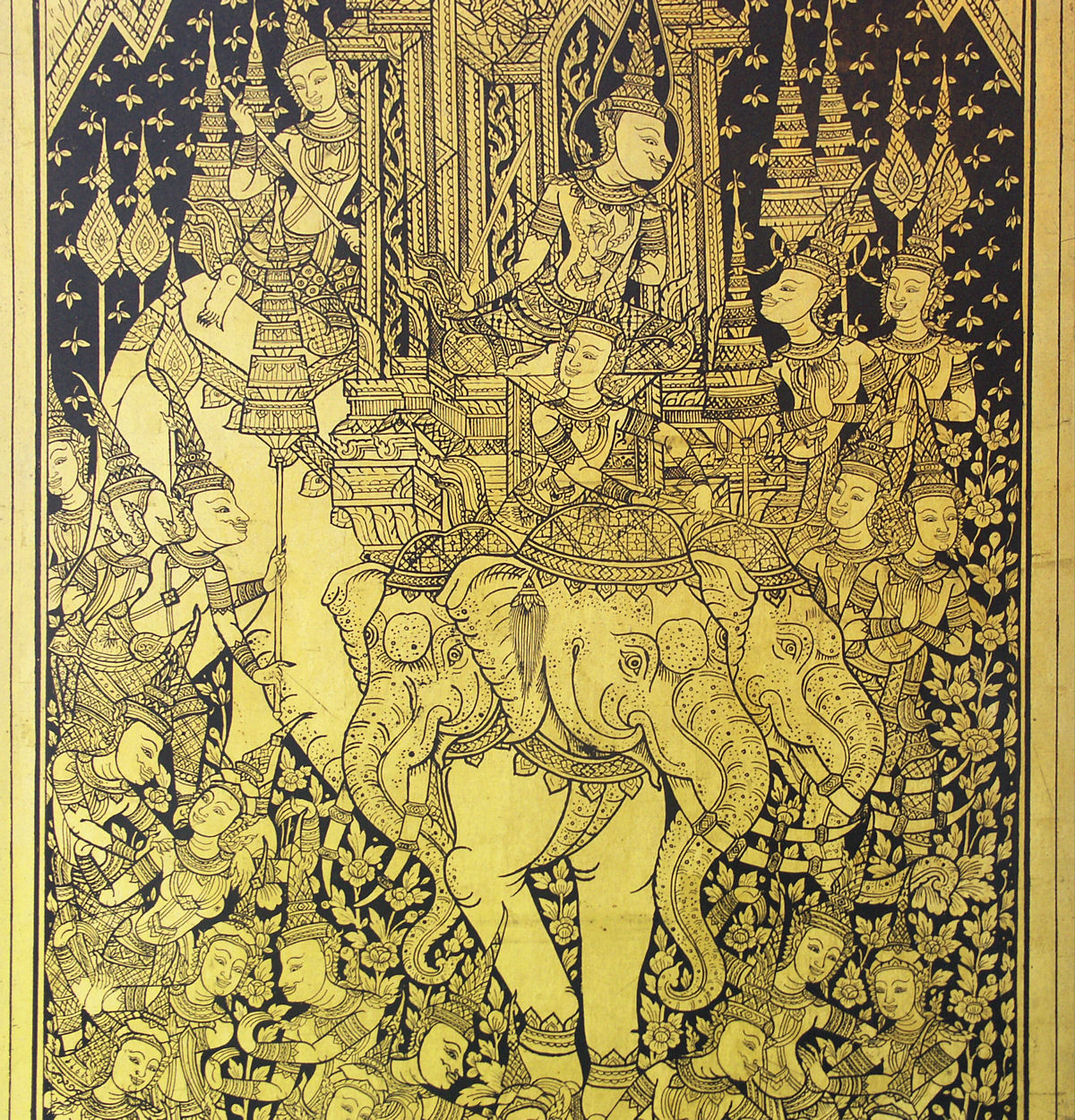

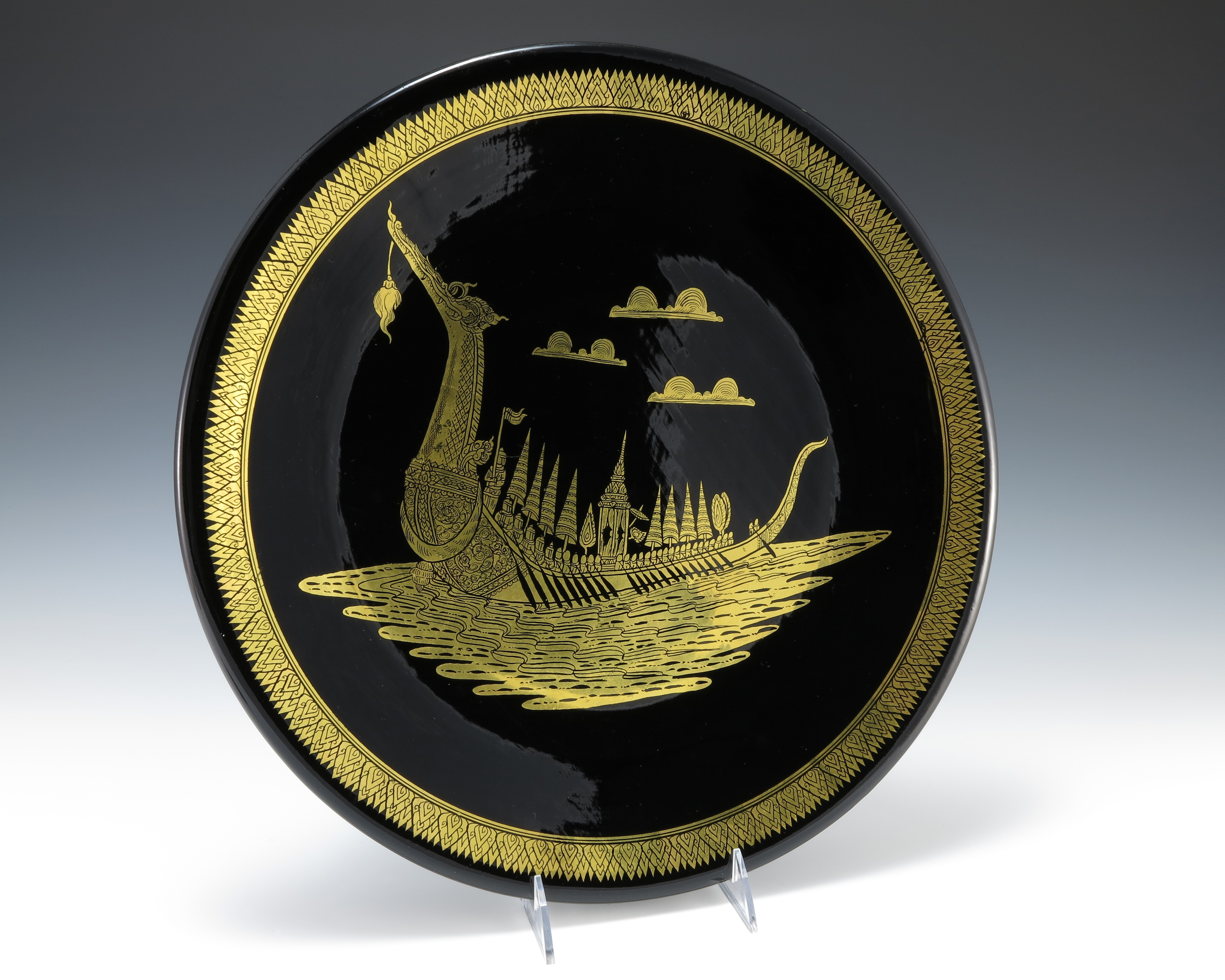

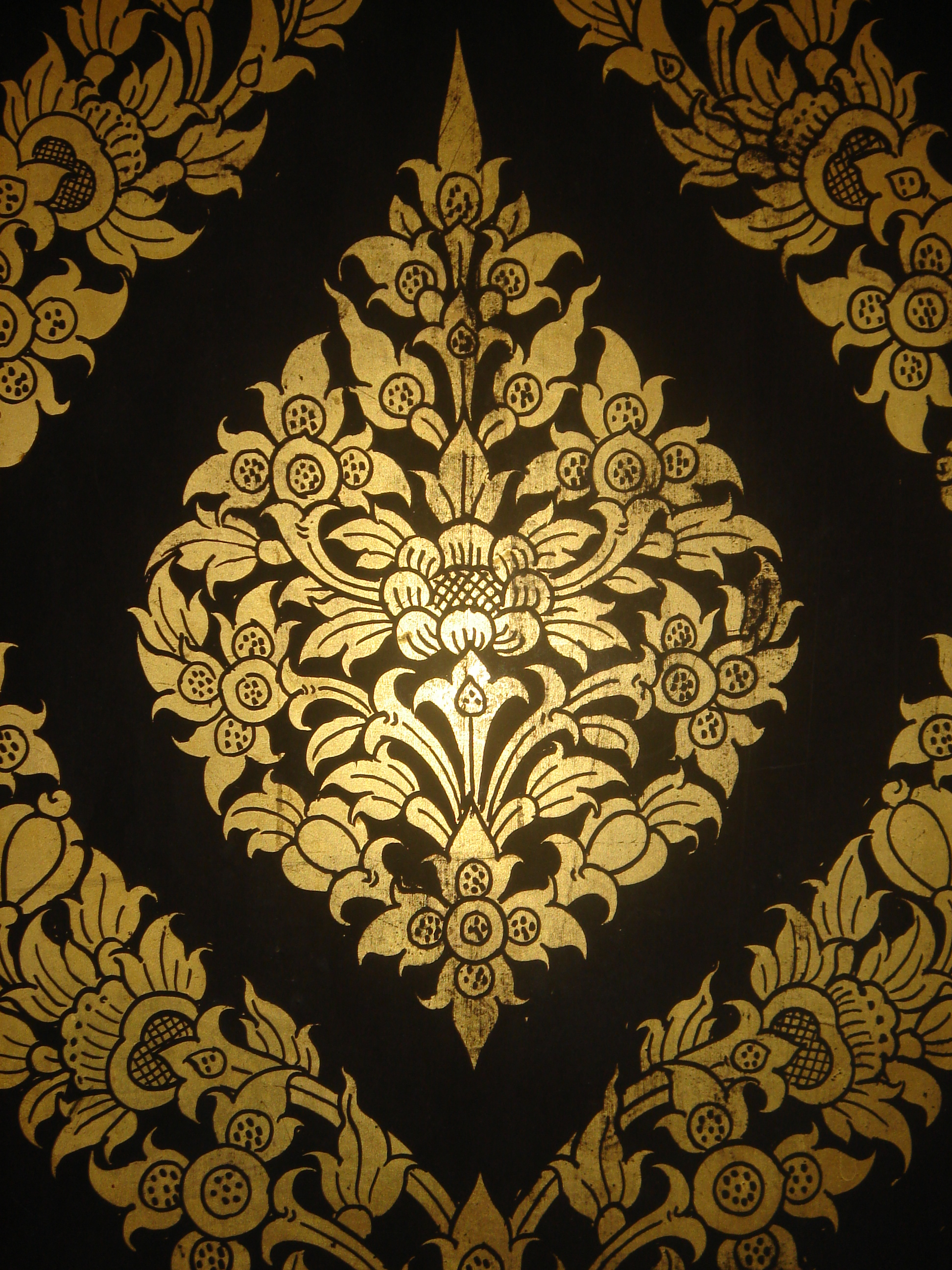

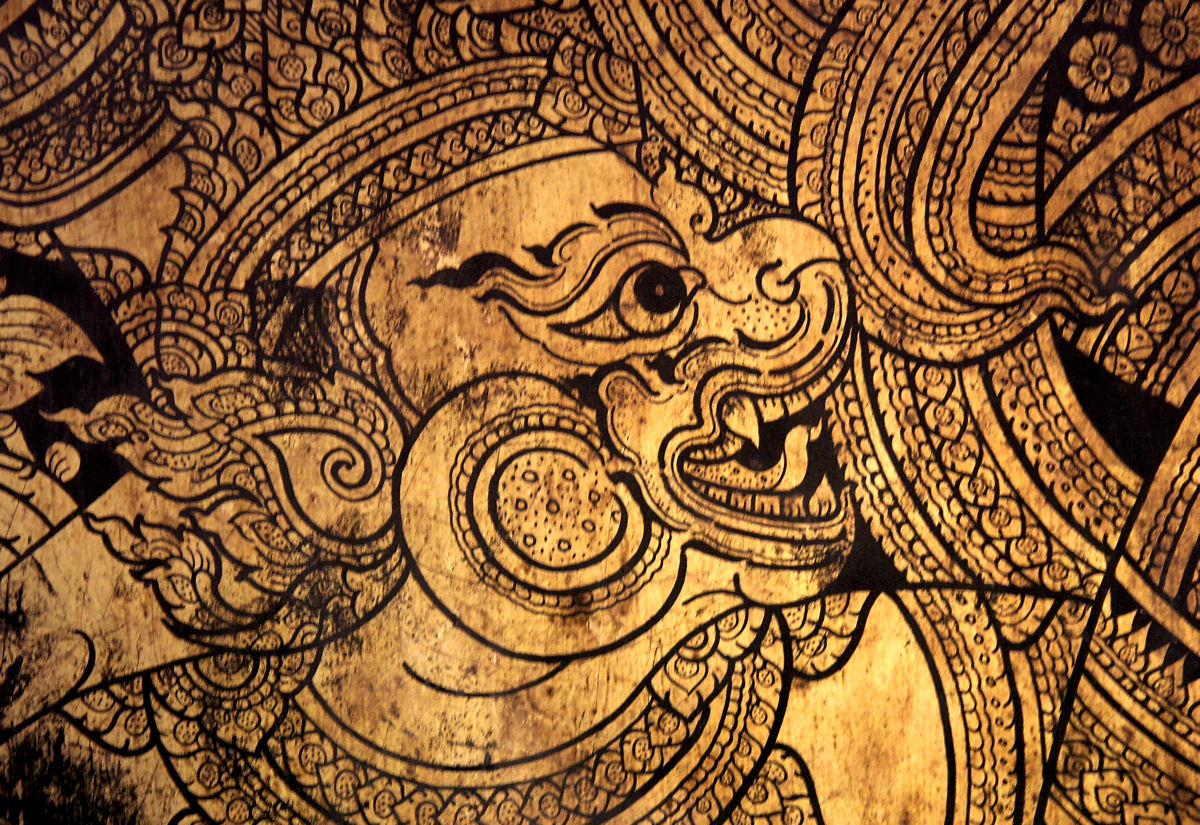

==== Long rak pid thong ====
Long rak pid thong is a refined and intricate Thai art form that employs gold leaf to embellish lacquered surfaces. This technique involves layering Rak resin onto a chosen material and allowing each layer to dry before proceeding to the next. Once the surface is smooth, artisans meticulously apply gold leaf by hand or brush, carefully following engraved lines and intricate patterns. Long rak pid thong is used to adorn various objects, including furniture, utensils, religious artifacts, and architectural elements such as chofa, bairaka, and arches.

==== Mother-of-pearl inlay ====
Mother-of-pearl inlay, also referred to as Muk or Pradab muk in Thai, involves the meticulous process of engraving and decorating small pieces of shell onto utensils using a binder called Rak. The iridescent colors produced by the reflecting shells create a stunning contrast against the black background. In the past, Muk was mainly used in royal institutions and Buddhist sacred sites. Today, the craft is primarily utilized for creating small souvenirs like pedestal bowls, trays, cigarette cases, and lighters due to its time-consuming production process.

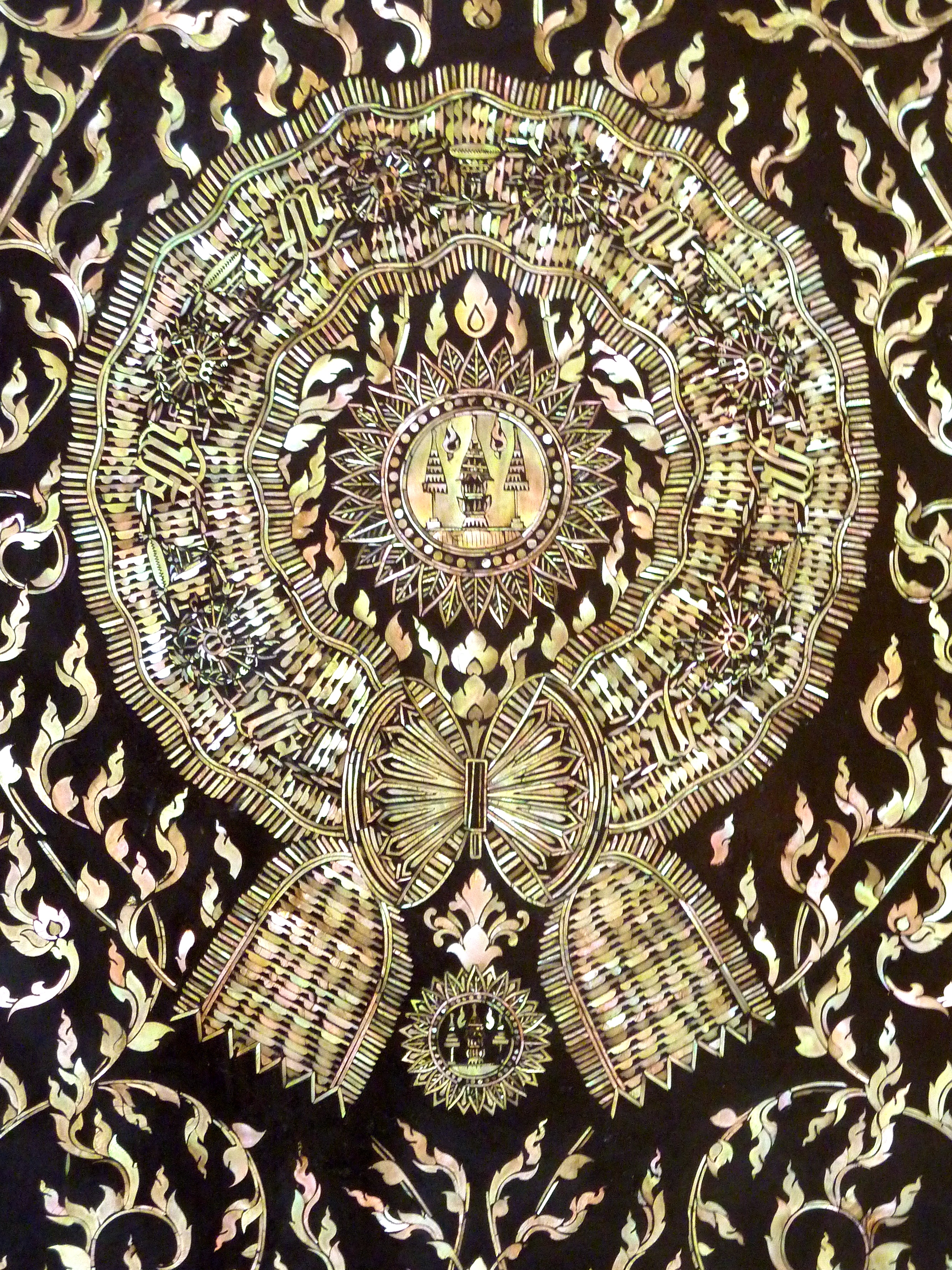

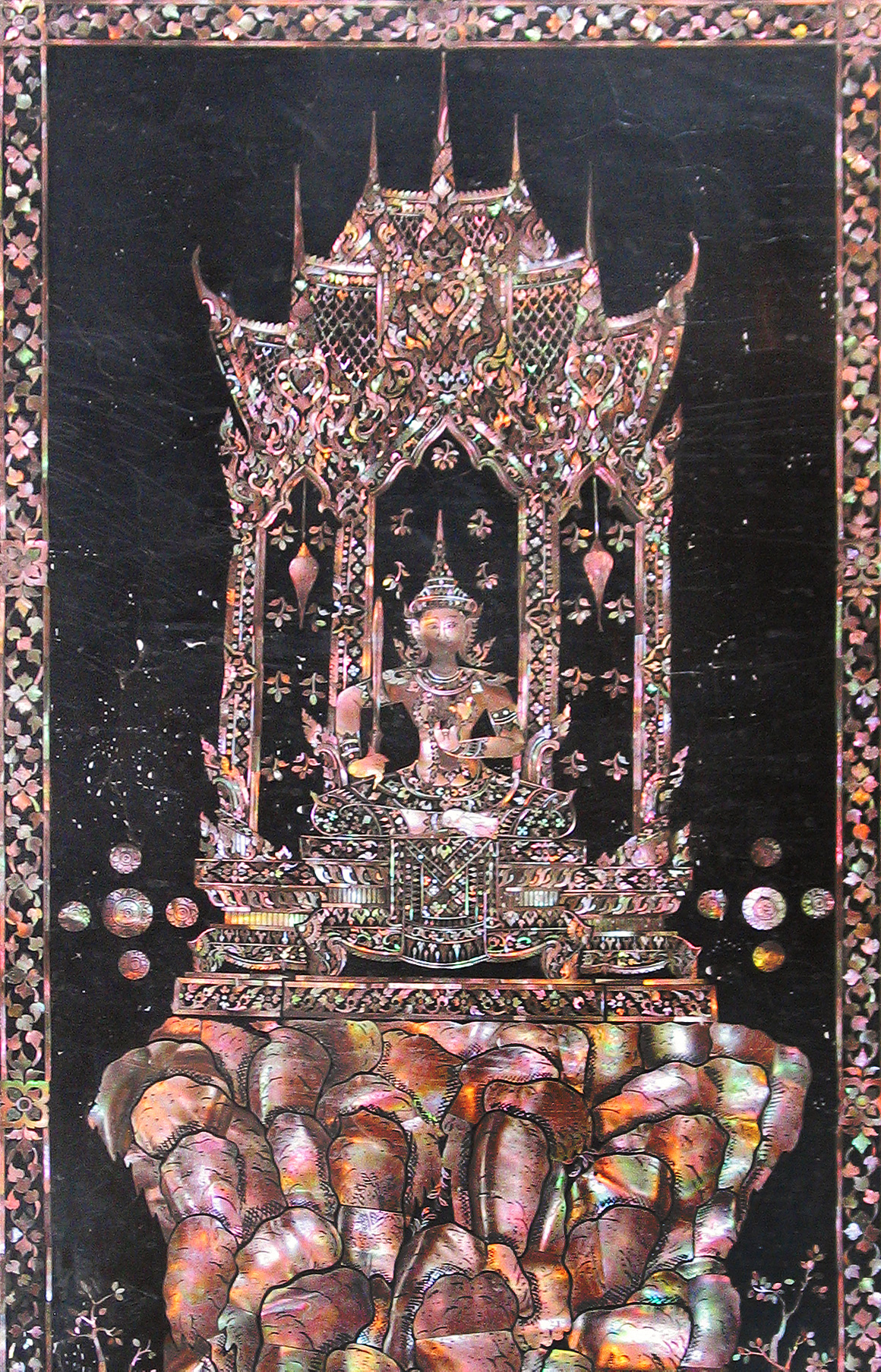

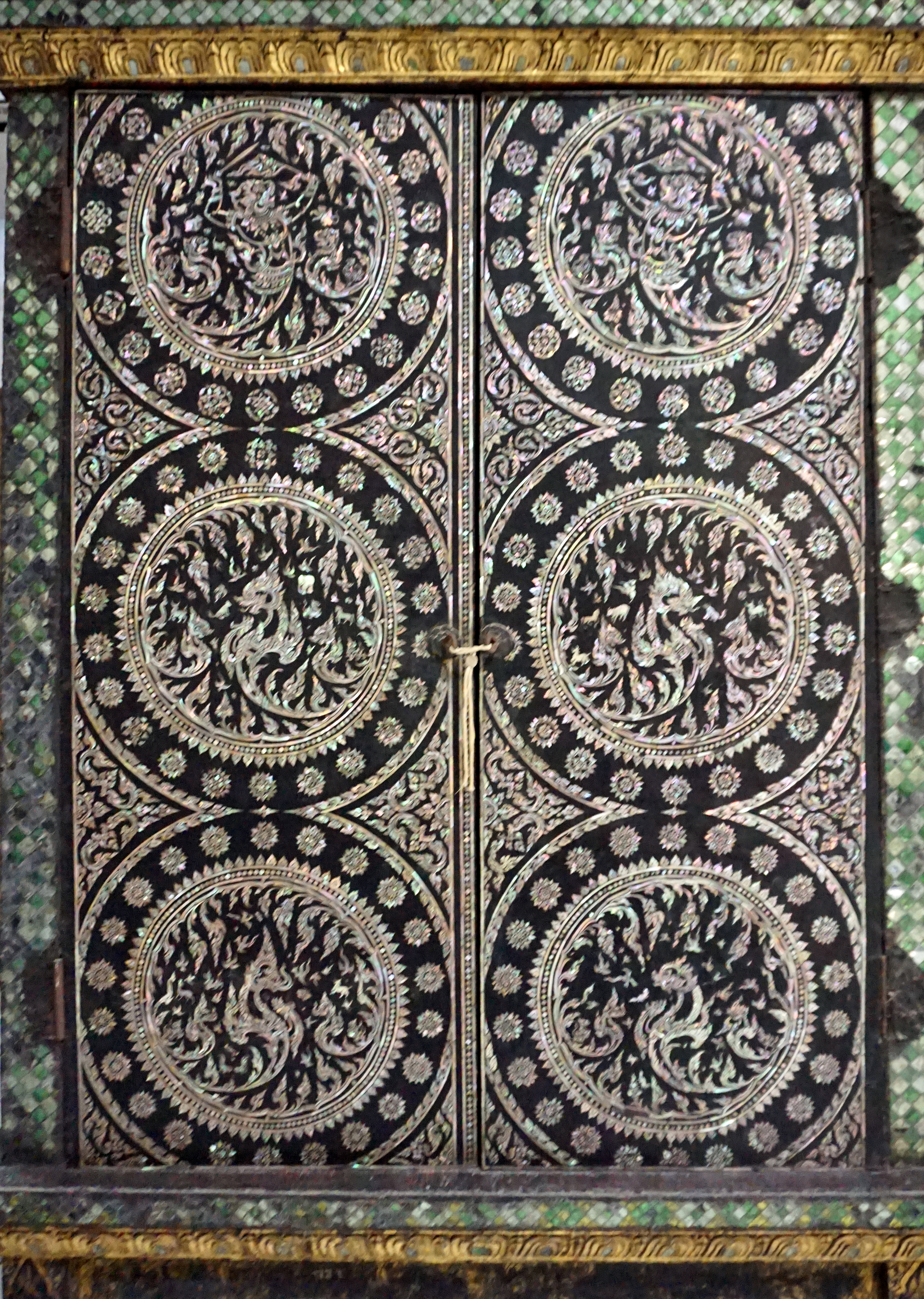

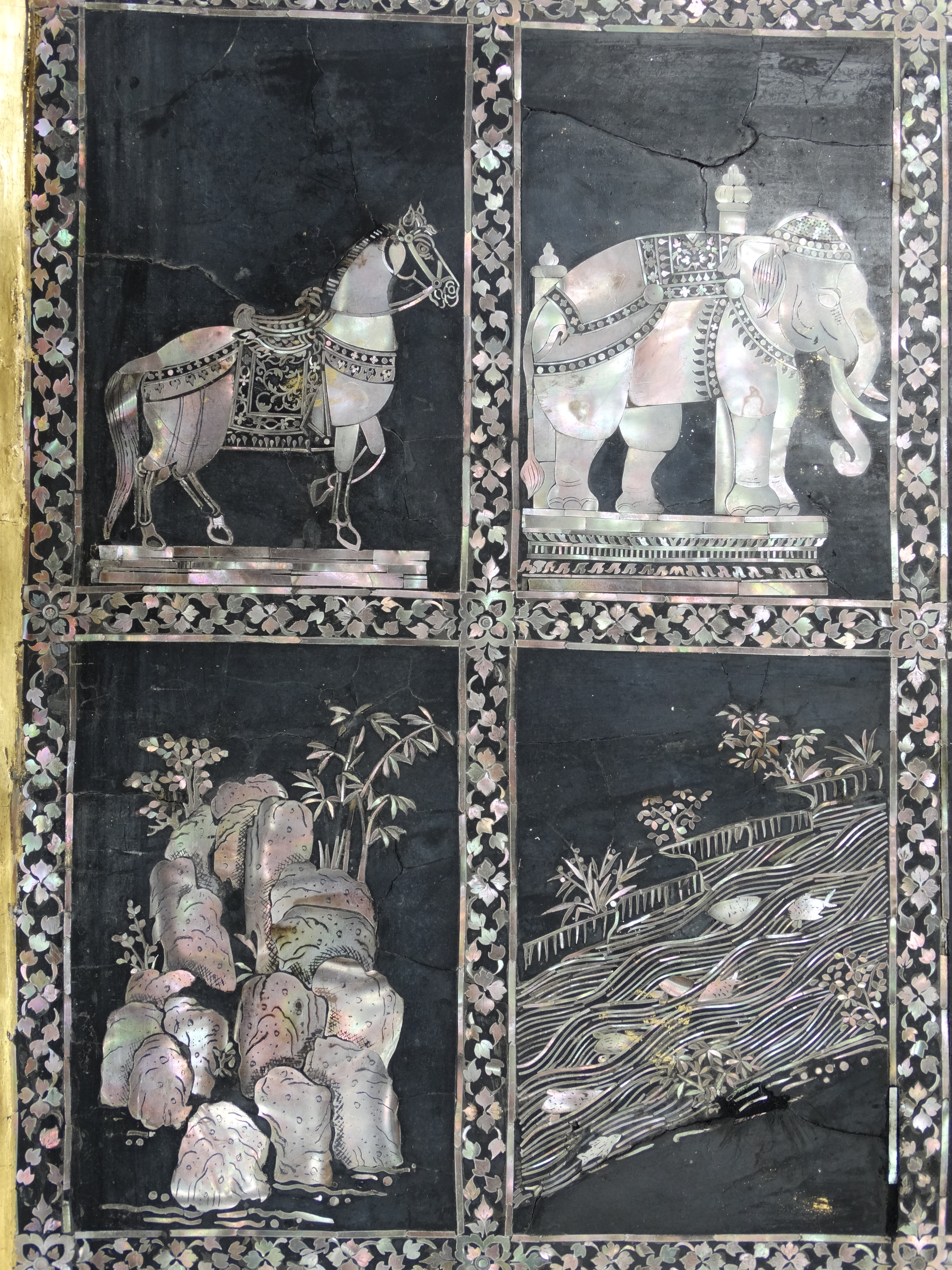

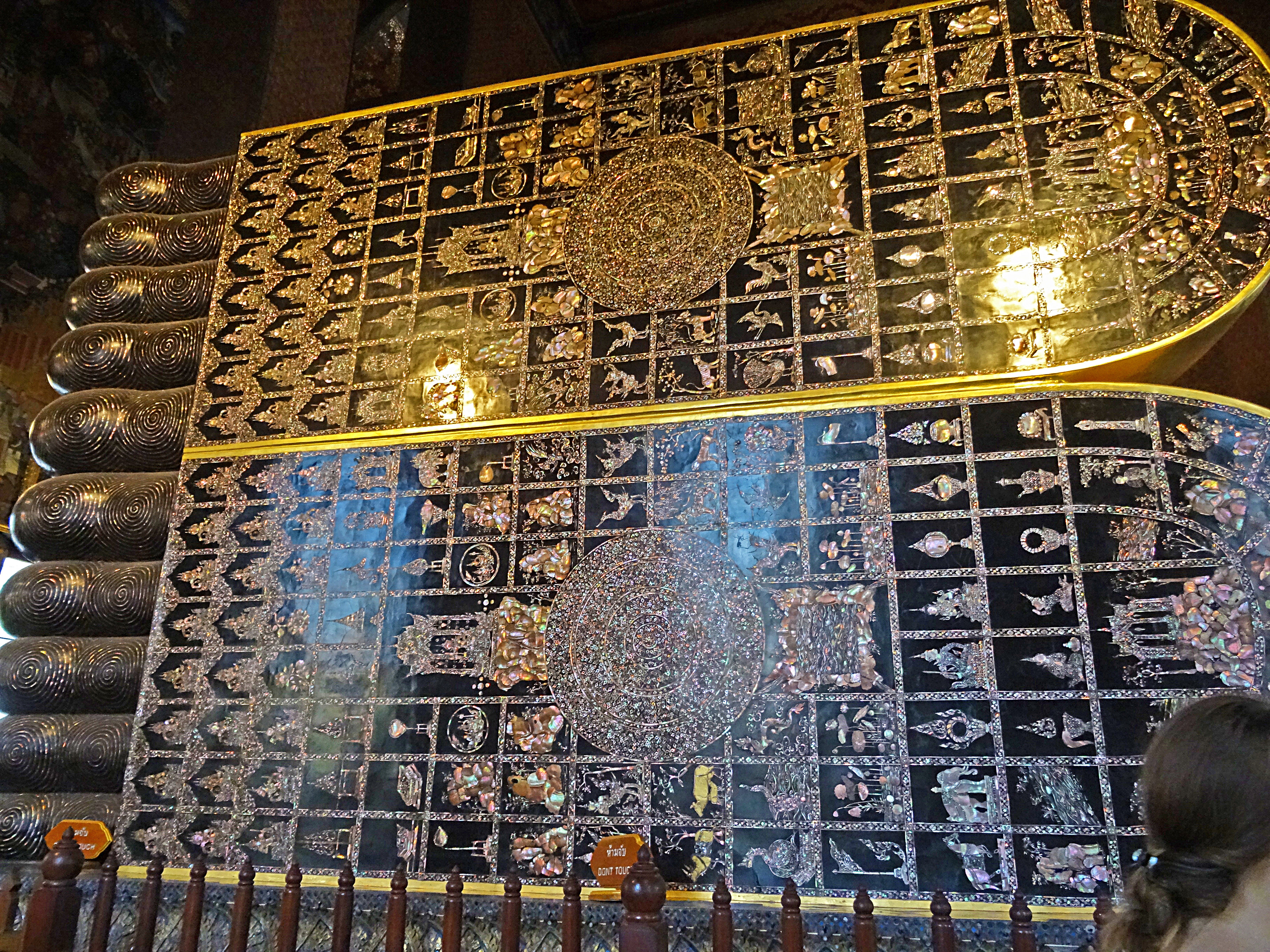

==== Pradab krachok ====
Another variation of Thai lacquer art is Pradab krachok, which involves the use of lacquer and mosaic decorations on traditional utensils, Khon apparel, and architectural details. Thai craftsmen follow a traditional method of first coating the chosen material with Rak lacquer before placing small glass pieces. They then apply a special mixture of boiled resin and powder made from burnt coconut shell, bricks, dried banana leaf, or rak samuk, which is a mixture of Rak resin and the ashes of dried banana leaves or grass. As the mixture seeps between the glass pieces and forms a seal, it prevents water from entering.

==== Lacquer painting ====
Lacquer painting, or Lai kammalor in Thai, is a technique that involves the use of powdered color and Rak varnish or its sun-dried raw form to create intricate works of art. The black resin board serves as the painting's background, and it is often accentuated by gold leaf or powder. Lacquer paintings are typically found on doors, windows, cabinets, partitions, and gold-gilded surfaces in Thailand. Although the technique had disappeared after the fall of Ayutthaya, it was revived successfully during the reign of King Rama III. However, the art form slowly declined again after his death.

==== Khrueang khoen ====
Khrueang khoen involves a lacquering technique that creates wooden and rattan items with a Rak resin latex surface. The surface is decorated with motifs created through scratching techniques or the application of vermillion or gold leaves. The craft originated from the Khün people who migrated into Northern Thailand from Kengtung in Shan state, Myanmar.

=== Paper ===
Samut khoi is an ancient type of Thai book that has been crafted for centuries from the bark of the Streblus asper tree. This type of paper is highly valued for its durability and is perfect for writing important documents and texts. Thai paper-making also involves the use of mulberry tree fibers to create Sa paper. This paper is known for its strength and versatility, making it ideal for use in traditional crafts such as lanterns, umbrellas, and parasols, which are often embellished with vibrant patterns and colors. Mulberry paper is also used in the intricate art of khon mask-making, as well as in the creation of wao, colorful kites that are flown during festivals and competitions.

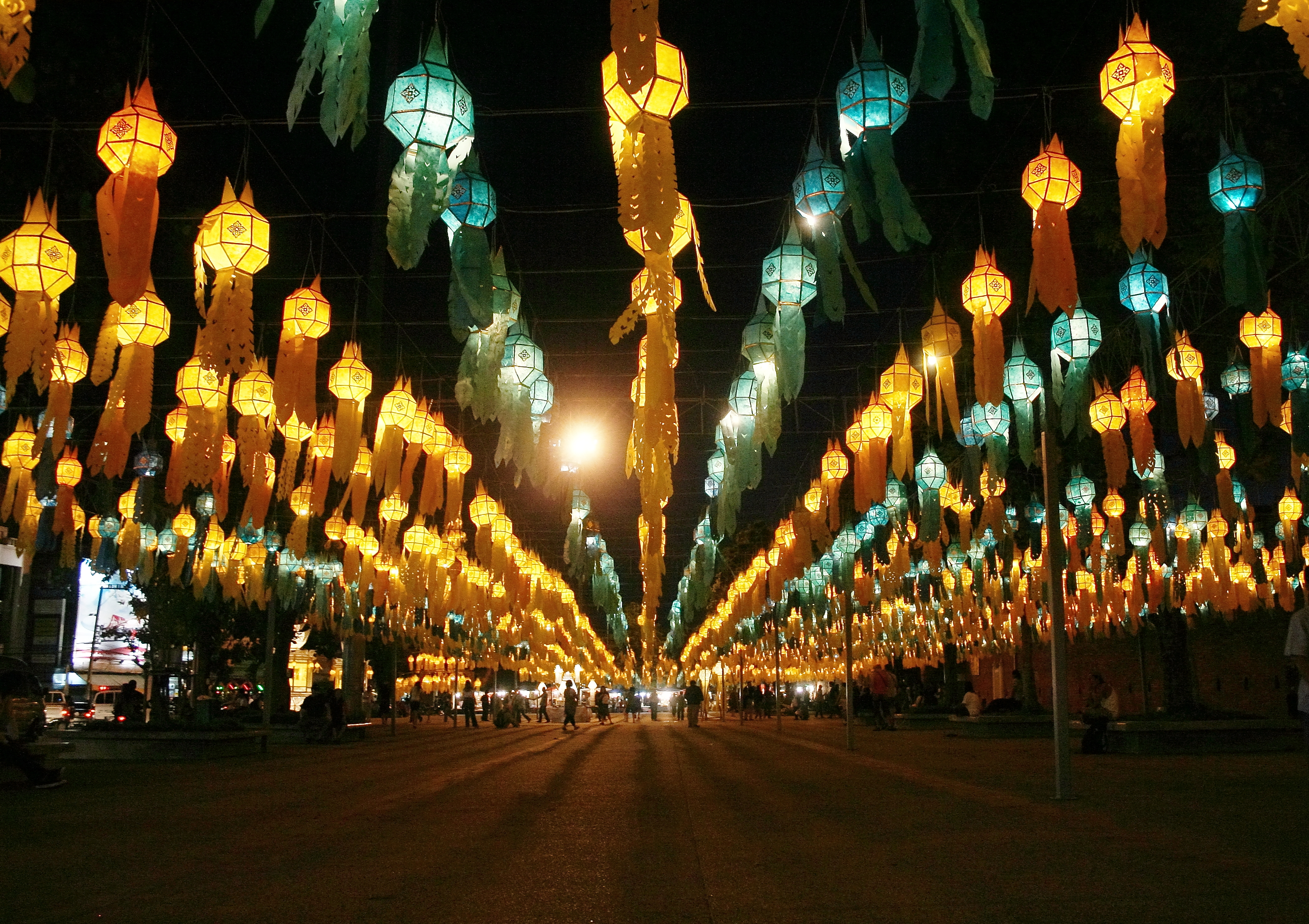

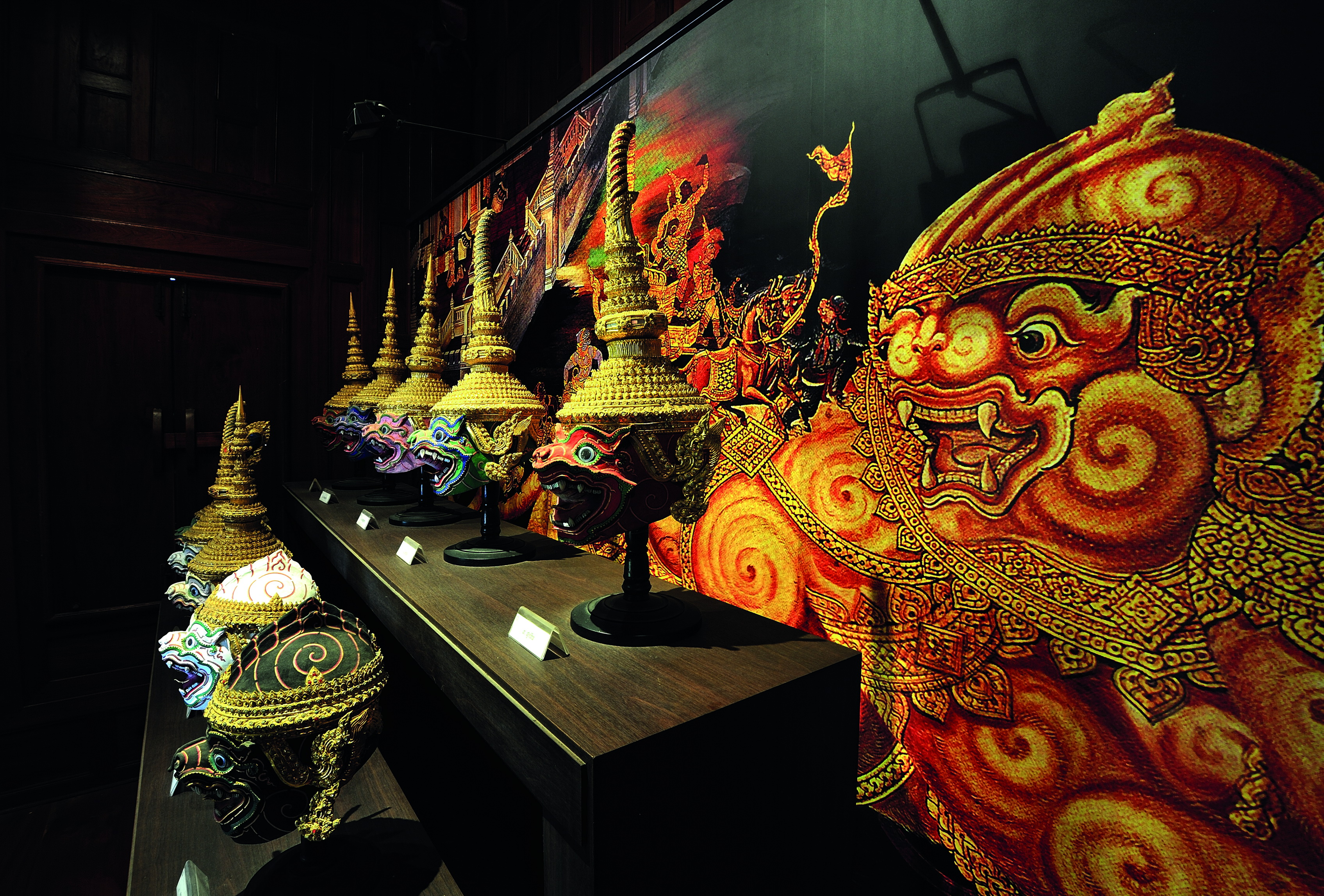

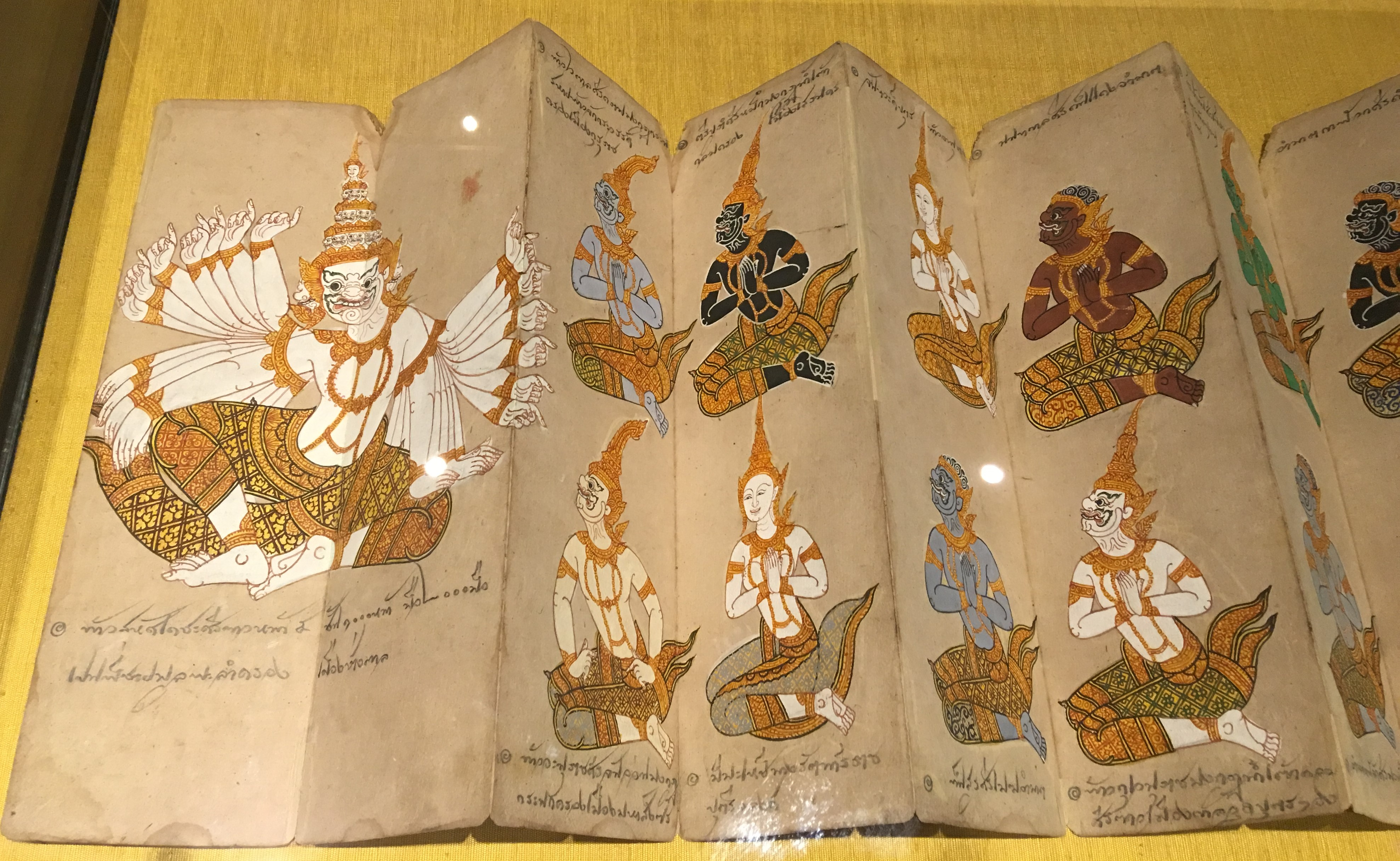

== See also ==
- Buddha images in Thailand
- Category:Thai artists
- Cinema of Thailand
- Culture of Thailand
- History of Asian art
- Iconography of Gautama Buddha in Laos and Thailand
- Khon
- List of Buddhist temples in Thailand
- Music of Thailand
- Thaitone
