= Wat Borommaniwat =

Buddhist temple in Bangkok, Thailand

Coordinates: 13°45′06.84″N 100°31′09.84″E

- วัดบรมนิวาส
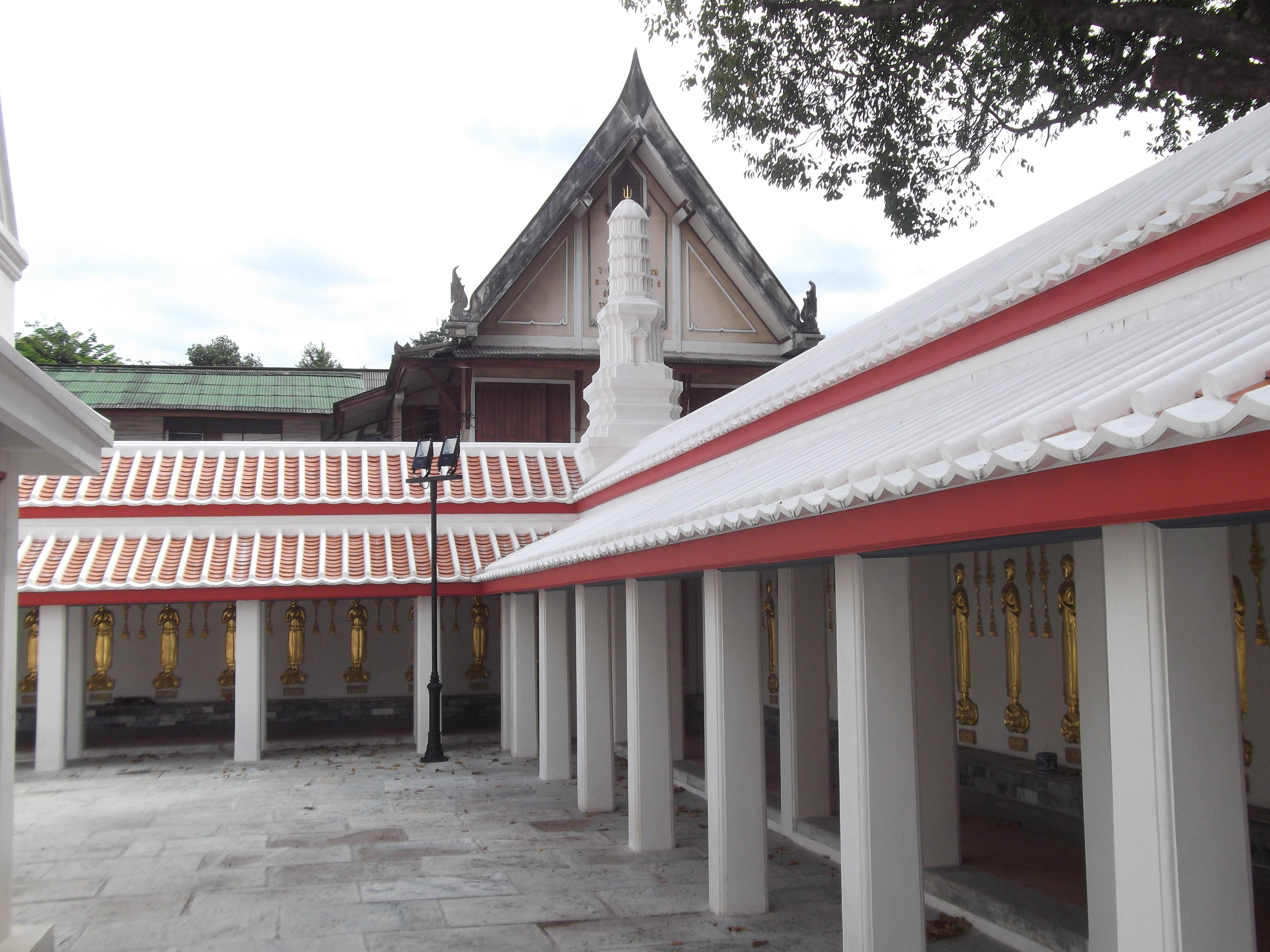
- Cloister of the temple

- Location within Thailand

Religion
- Affiliation: Buddhism (Theravāda: Dhammayuttika Nikaya)

Location
- Location: 2 Rama I Rd, Rong Mueang, Pathum Wan, Bangkok, Thailand
- Country: Thailand

Architecture
- Founder: King Mongkut (Rama IV)
- Completed: 1834

Wat Borommaniwat (Thai: วัดบรมนิวาส; Thai pronunciation: [wát bɔː.rom.ma.ní.wâːt]) is a second-class royal monastery (Phra Aram Luang Chan Tho) of the Thammayut Nikaya sect, located in Rong Mueang Subdistrict, Pathum Wan District, Bangkok, Thailand.

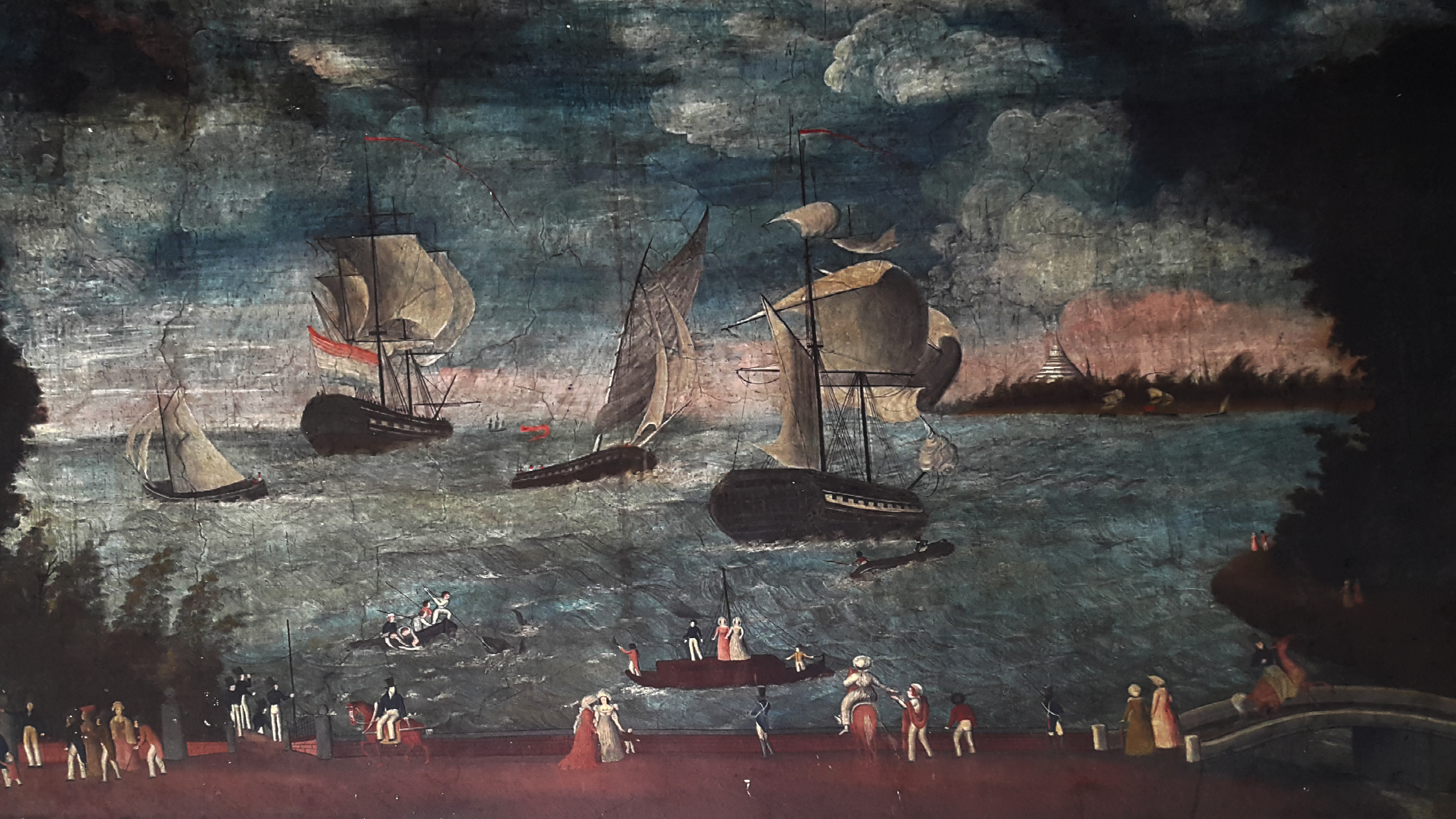
One mural by Khrua In Khong inside the main hall

== History ==
Wat Borommaniwat was founded by Phra Vajirananthera prior to his coronation as king, in 1834 CE (2377 BE) under the original name Wat Borommasuk (วัดบรมสุข). It was intended as an aranyawasi (อรัญวาสี; “forest-dwelling”) counterpart to Wat Bowonniwet Vihara, a khammawasi (คามวาสี; “city-dwelling”) monastery in the Bang Lamphu area of Rattanakosin Island. The temple’s original structures included the ordination hall (ubosot), a pagoda (chedi), and fourteen monks’ dwellings (kuti).

Construction continued until Phra Vajirananthera left the monkhood and ascended the throne as King Mongkut. The temple was later renamed Wat Borommaniwat (“Monastery of Supreme Abode”) during the reign of Rama V. During this time, restoration was carried out under the supervision of Phra Ubali Kunupamachan (Chan Siricando), supported by Chao Chom Manda Thapthim and her royal children.

The temple’s murals were painted by Khrua In Khong, one of the leading artists of King Mongkut’s reign. His works depict Buddhist themes through Western art techniques and hidden Dharma symbolism.

Further restoration efforts continued through the reigns of subsequent monarchs and abbots. Today, the temple remains an active monastic and educational center under the Thammayut Nikaya.

== Architecture and Art ==
The main ordination hall enshrines the principal Buddha image, Phra Thotsaphonlayan (พระทศพลญาณ; “Tenfold Power Buddha”), in the Maravijaya posture. The murals within, created by Khrua In Khong, blend Western artistic perspective with Buddhist allegory.

== Location ==
Wat Borommaniwat is located adjacent to the Bangkok railway station (Hua Lamphong). Trains pass close to its boundary wall, near the Yotse Bridge and Bobae Market.

== Lineage of Abbots ==
Since its establishment, Wat Borommaniwat has been administered by the following abbots:

No.	Name	Start of Term	End of Term
1	Phra Yanrakkhita (Suk)	1834 CE (2377 BE)	1851 CE (2394 BE)
2	Phra Amarapirakkhita (Koet Amaro)	1852 CE (2395 BE)	1869 CE (2412 BE)
3	Phra Phrommuni (Muean Sumitto)	1870 CE (2413 BE)	1901 CE (2444 BE)
4	Phra Vinayarakkhita (Chan)	1902 CE (2445 BE)	1903 CE (2446 BE)
5	Phra Ubali Kunupamachan (Chan Siricando)	1904 CE (2447 BE)	1932 CE (2475 BE)
6	Somdet Phra Maha Wirawong (Oun Tisso)	1932 CE (2475 BE)	1956 CE (2499 BE)
7	Phra Thammadilok (Thongdam Chandoopamo)	1957 CE (2500 BE)	1972 CE (2515 BE)
8	Phra Thepworakhun (Singhak Chakkaro)	1973 CE (2516 BE)	1974 CE (2517 BE)
9	Phra Phrommuni (Bu Sujino)	1975 CE (2518 BE)	2000 CE (2543 BE)
10	Phra Thepsumedhi (Sanong Khemee)	2001 CE (2544 BE)	2003 CE (2546 BE)
11	Phra Thammawatchirakun (Prasat Pannatharo)	2004 CE (2547 BE)	Present
