= Khrua In Khong =

19th-century Thai artist and Buddhist monk

Khrua In Khong (Thai: ขรัวอินโข่ง), one of the most celebrated Thai artists, was active in the 1850s and 1860s during the reign of King Rama IV. He was a painter under the patronage of King Rama IV (Mongkut). Khrua In Khong and King Rama IV developed their friendship when they were in the monkhood during the reign of King Rama III. The king was very fond of him and became a patron to Khrua In Khong; once the king ascended the throne, he frequently ordered Khrua In Khong to paint murals in numerous temples that he built or restored.

His style had been greatly influenced by Western painting, thus distinguishing it from other conventional Thai paintings. He is well known as the first artist to introduce linear perspective to Thai traditional art.

The works of Khrua In Khong served under the king's desire to modernize Thailand in order to survive the Western colonialist aspiration. His best-known works are mural paintings in the ubosoth (chapel) of Wat Bowonniwet and Wat Borom Niwat.

== Biography ==
=== Early life ===
Khrua In Khong's birth date and origins are uncertain. He was born in Bang Chan, Phetchaburi province, Thailand in the reign of King Rama III. He was ordained at Wat Ratchaburana (Wat Liap) and stayed as a monk for the rest of his life.

His original name was “In” not “Khrua In Khong”, “Khrua” and “Khong” were a prefix and postfix words to specify his personal identity.

The word “Khrua” often refers to an elder monk or a person who has a strict or moody character. It also meant a teacher who specialized in difficult subjects, and the word “Khong” quoting Saan Somdet (Princes’ Correspondence)

“…he stayed in monkhood as a neophyte for too long; hence he was called In Khong (falling tone). At first, I thought had mispronounced Khong (low tone) for Khong, I now realize there is no mistake. Taking Hoi Khong for example, it means big snail. … Therefore, Khong and Khong are the same. "

It was also known that Khrua In Khong was not very sociable. He was an introvert and always stayed alone by himself in order to avoid being interrupted by visitors during his work process. He went as far as entering and leaving his kuti (a monk's residence) through the windows.

=== Education ===
There is no evidence of when and where Khrua In Khong practiced his drawing and painting skill. According to his sketchbook, he started drawing in a conventional Thai artistic style which puts much effort into an outline. All shapes and forms have to be drawn properly, very carefully and precisely. During the 19th century the exchange of culture between Siam and Europe flourished, Khrua In Khong would have learnt and absorbed western style drawing techniques from European paintings and saw European print and photography, despite never visiting the west.

=== Career ===
Khrua In Khong and King Rama IV had a close relationship since they were both ordained in the era of King Rama III. When King Rama IV reigned, the friendship remained. Khrua In Khong became a painter under the patronage of the king and was frequently ordered to paint murals in temples that he built or restored. It was mentioned in the royal chronicles

“…the king demanded the service of Phra Achan In in Painting murals depicting the royal chronicles of the Bangkok period.”

Khrua In Khong's early work was not yet departed from Thai traditional artistic motifs. The murals in Ratchakoramanuson pavilion and Ratchaphongsanuson Pavilion at Wat Phra Kaew (Temple of the Emerald Buddha) both reflect Thai conventional style. The subject is also mainly about Buddha. Murals in Wat Mahasamanaram do not depict stories of Buddha, but still closely relate to Buddhism. The murals in Wat Phra Ngam, Ayutthaya are the depictions of the life of Buddha.

The most renowned works of Khrua In Khong are the depictions of Buddhist teachings (Dharma) in Wat Bowonniwet and Wat Borom Niwat which have the figures and buildings in western style. The murals represented Buddhist dharma in the form of allegories. It required a high mental capability to understand the context of the Dharma, for example, the pictures of water lotuses in a pond, horse-racing, and a man pointing the way of virtue.

The themes of the murals in Wat Bowonniwet and Wat Borom Niwat were not only related to Buddhism, but also political subjects such as the murals that portray George Washington’s residence and the United States Congress.

In the era of King Rama IV, Western colonialism flourished. The king was concerned with the threat of European countries and urged to modernize Siam in a western way - both technologically and culturally, hence the works of Khrua In Khong were serving his demand.

=== Later life and death ===
It is unclear what caused Khrua In Khong's death and when it was. It is believed to be in the era of King Rama IV because there is no sign of his life and works in the age of King Rama V. It is believed that he stayed as a monk for the rest of his life.

== Technique and style ==
Khrua In Khong, although having never visited Europe even once, developed his style from conventional Thai painting to become more western-like by relying on western commercial prints, observations of westerners in Bangkok and his imagination.

Thai artistic tradition before the time of Khrua In Khong was unrealistic. The water waves were drawn as overlapping fish scales, the trees look artificial and the figures stood in unnatural poses. In contrast, Khrua In Khong preferred to paint realistic gestures. The scenario, trees, and figures became more natural and realistic like a western painting.

Thai artistic motifs depended on the use of lines and flat color without using light and shade, the objects were the same size regardless of their relative distances making the figures and buildings only two dimensions not three dimensions like the western painting. Khrua In Khong was the first Thai artist to use the three-dimensional perspective technique.

In the meantime, people began exchanging culture and art with European countries. Color materials also began to be imported from abroad. Thus the painting in this period became more vivid and colorful. Khrua In Khong, however, still remained using low saturation, bright objects among dimmed gray and dark background colors. Khrua In Khong was famous for his use of monochromic colors that give harmonious satisfaction, unlike complementary colors. He often used dark shades of blue and green along with light shades of blue, pink and white and avoided contrasting colors. He painted the background with dark colors, male outfits with dark blue and white, while female dresses were light blue or pink making the figures look soft and gentle among a shady background that appears like a dreamy landscape.

Despite the fact that he departed from the traditional Thai painting style, the works of Khrua In Khong were still mostly related to Buddhism since he himself stayed in the monkhood for life. Moreover, he had been greatly influenced by the king's religious beliefs as a painter under the King's patronage.

In addition, the works of Khrua In Khong were not entirely about Buddhism. They were also important as historical records of political events and social conditions during the reign of King Rama III.

== Disciples ==
Khrua In Khong had many disciples but only one of them was recorded - Phra Khru Kasin Sangwon. He was the abbot of Wat Thong Nopphakhun, who painted murals in Wat Thong Nopphakhun. His murals were allegoric paintings, same as the Dharma Paintings of Khrua In Khong, but the figures were Thai style instead of western.

== Gallery ==
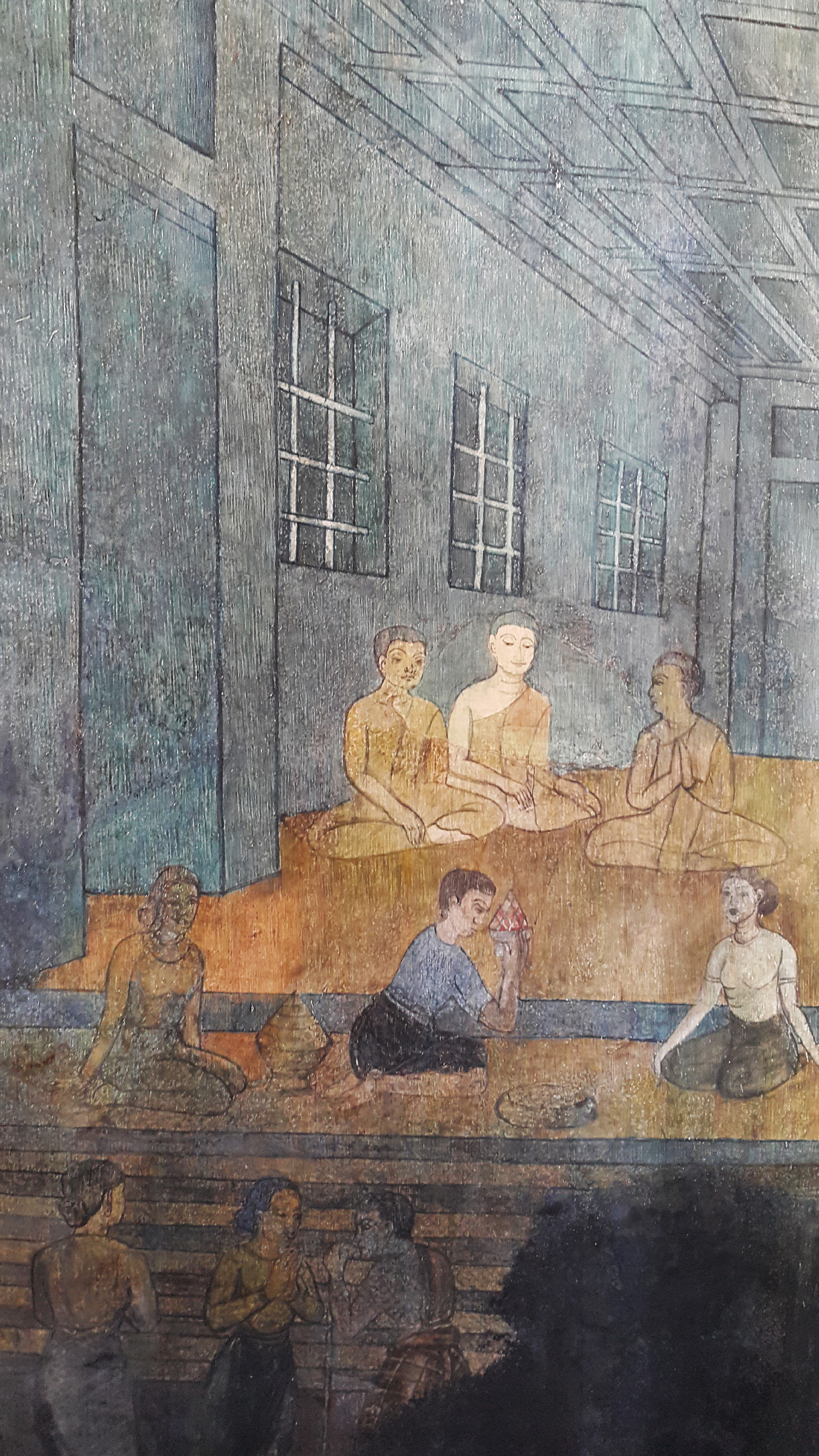

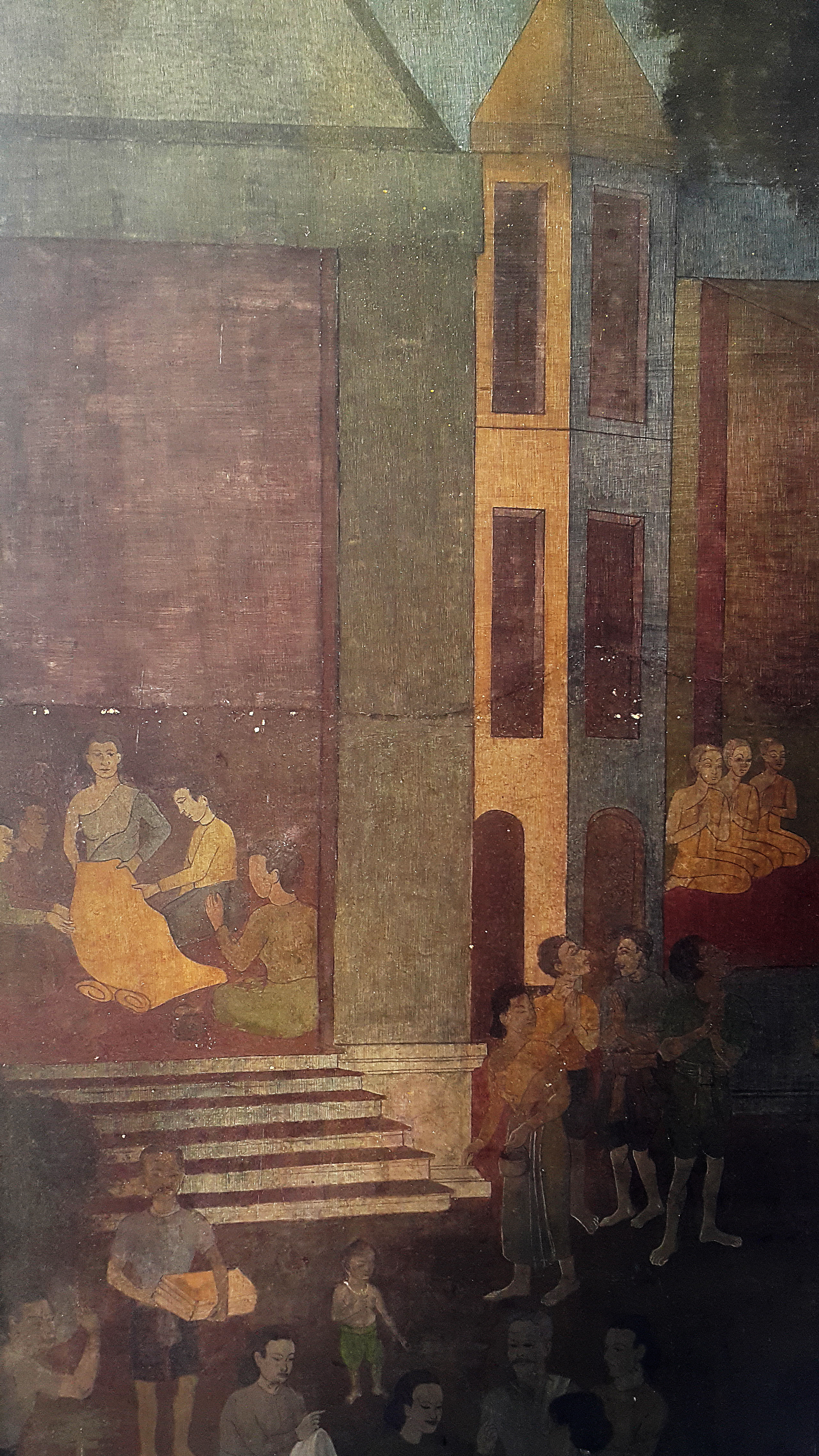

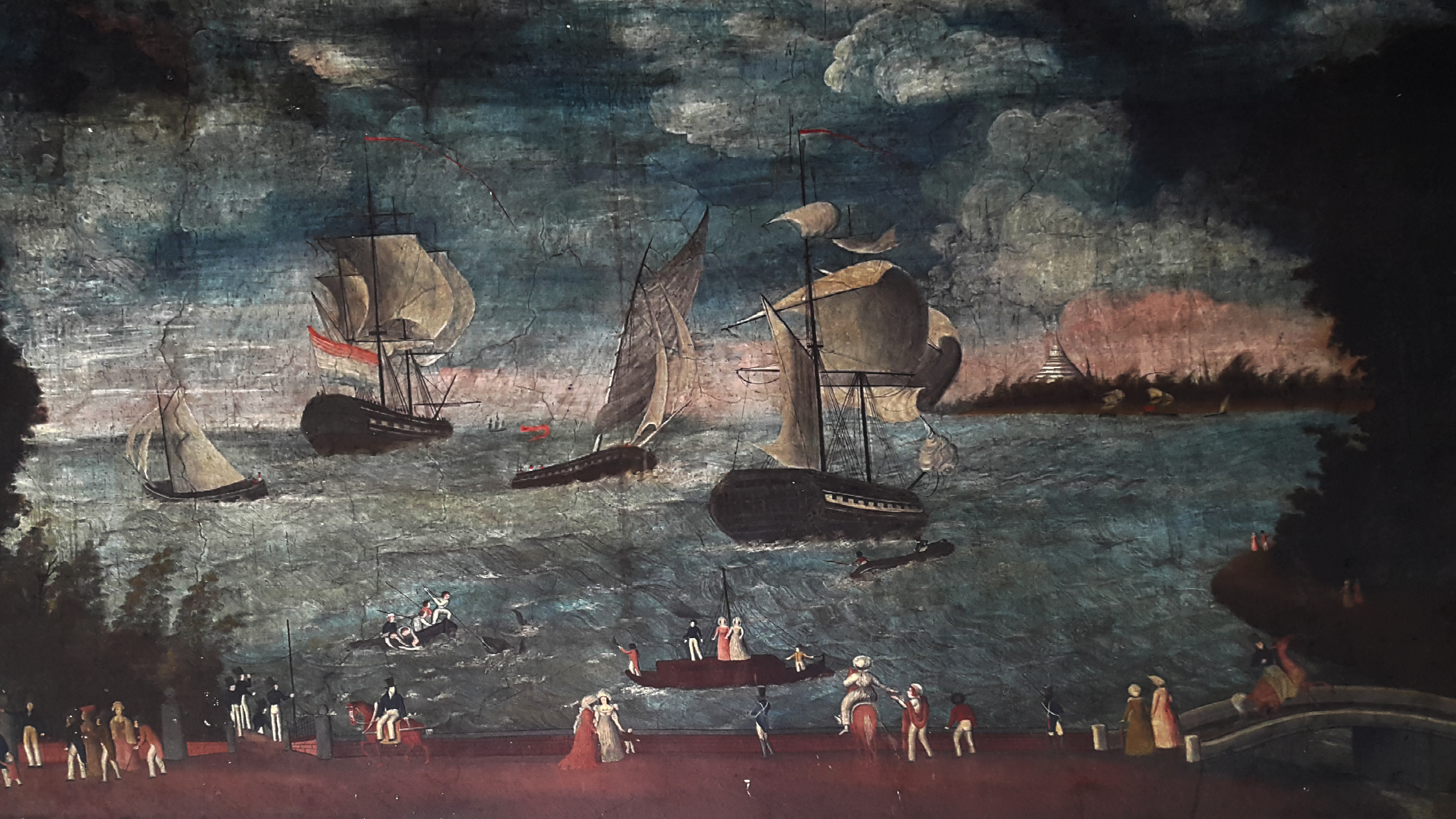

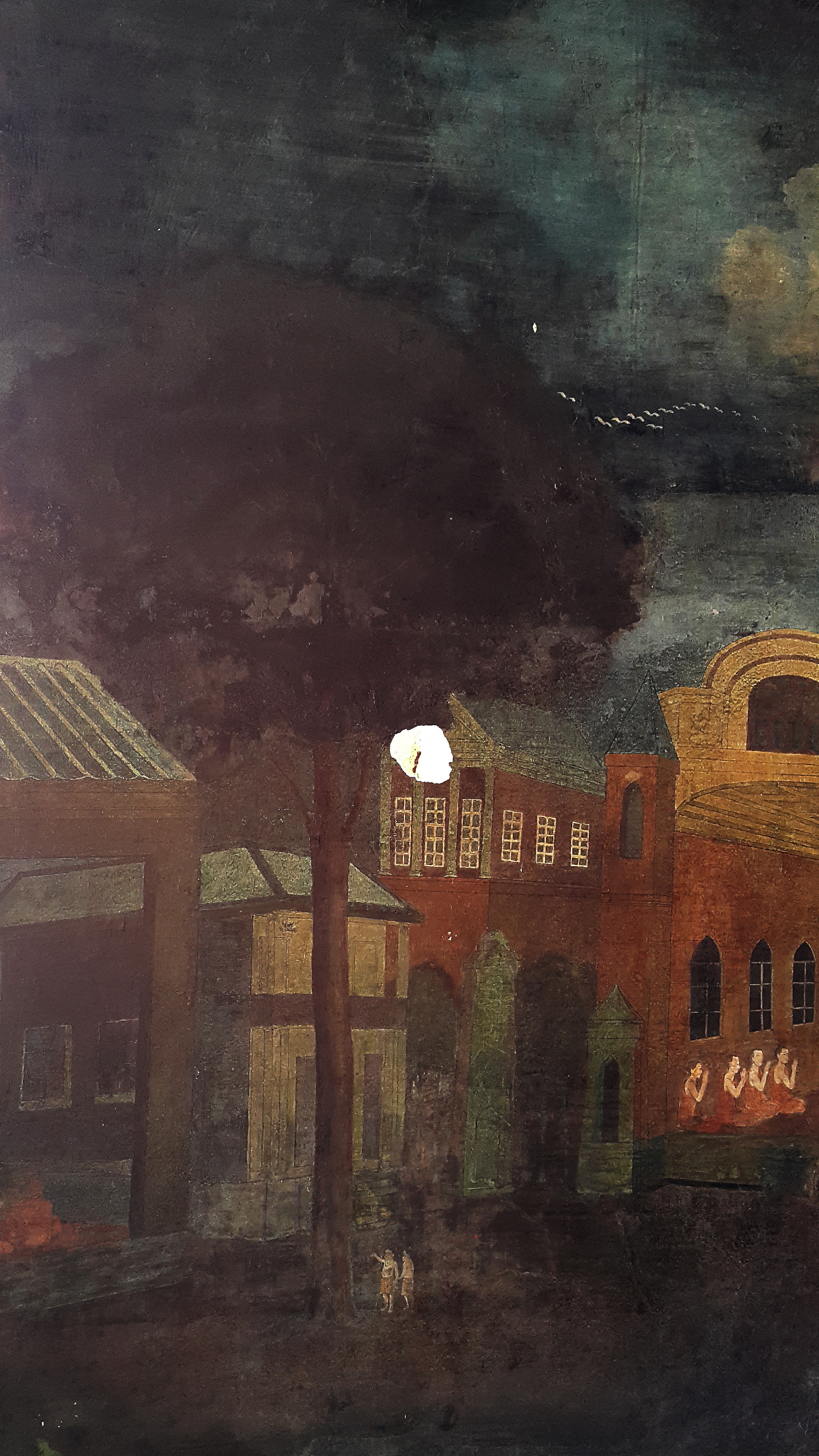

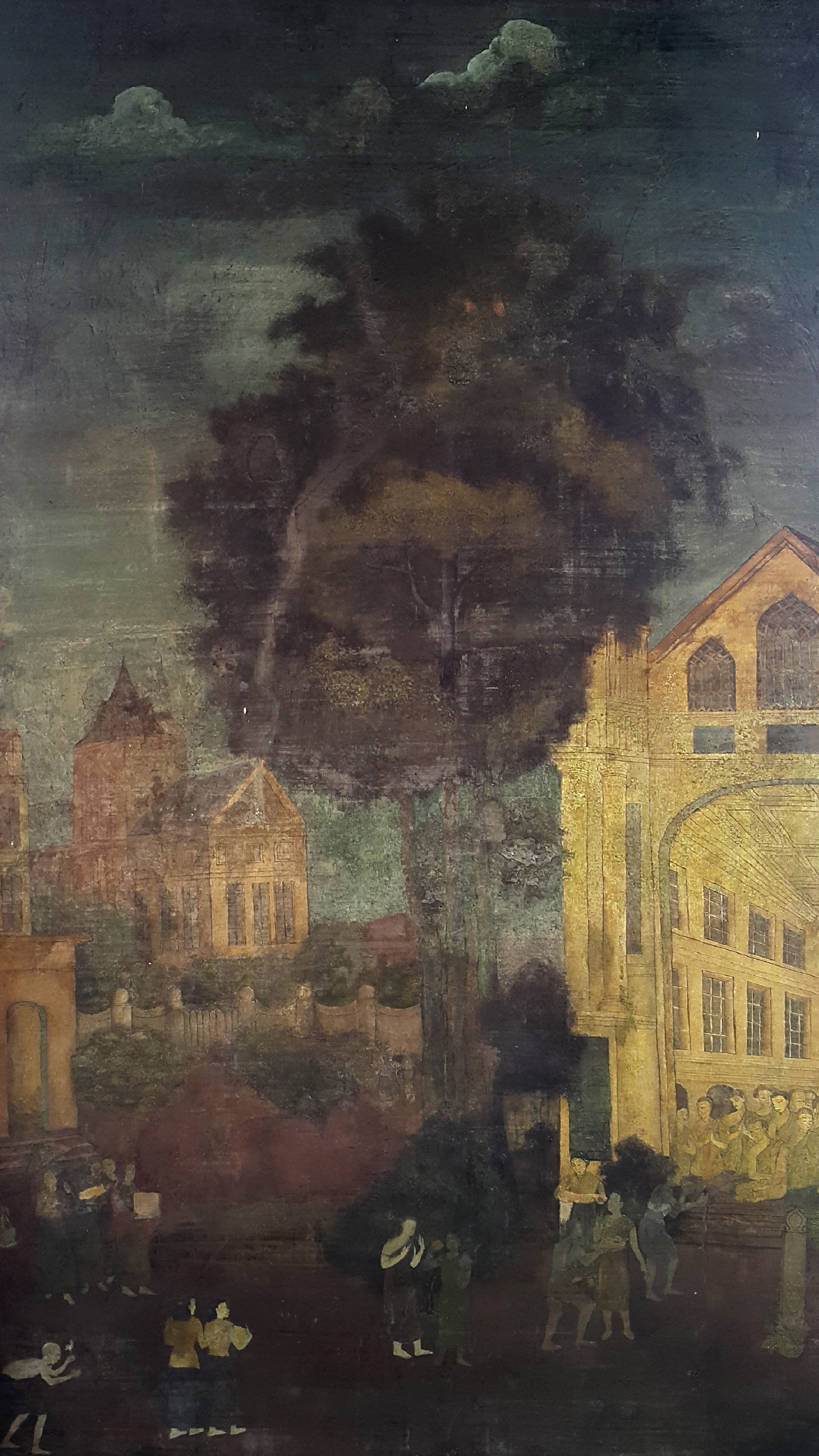

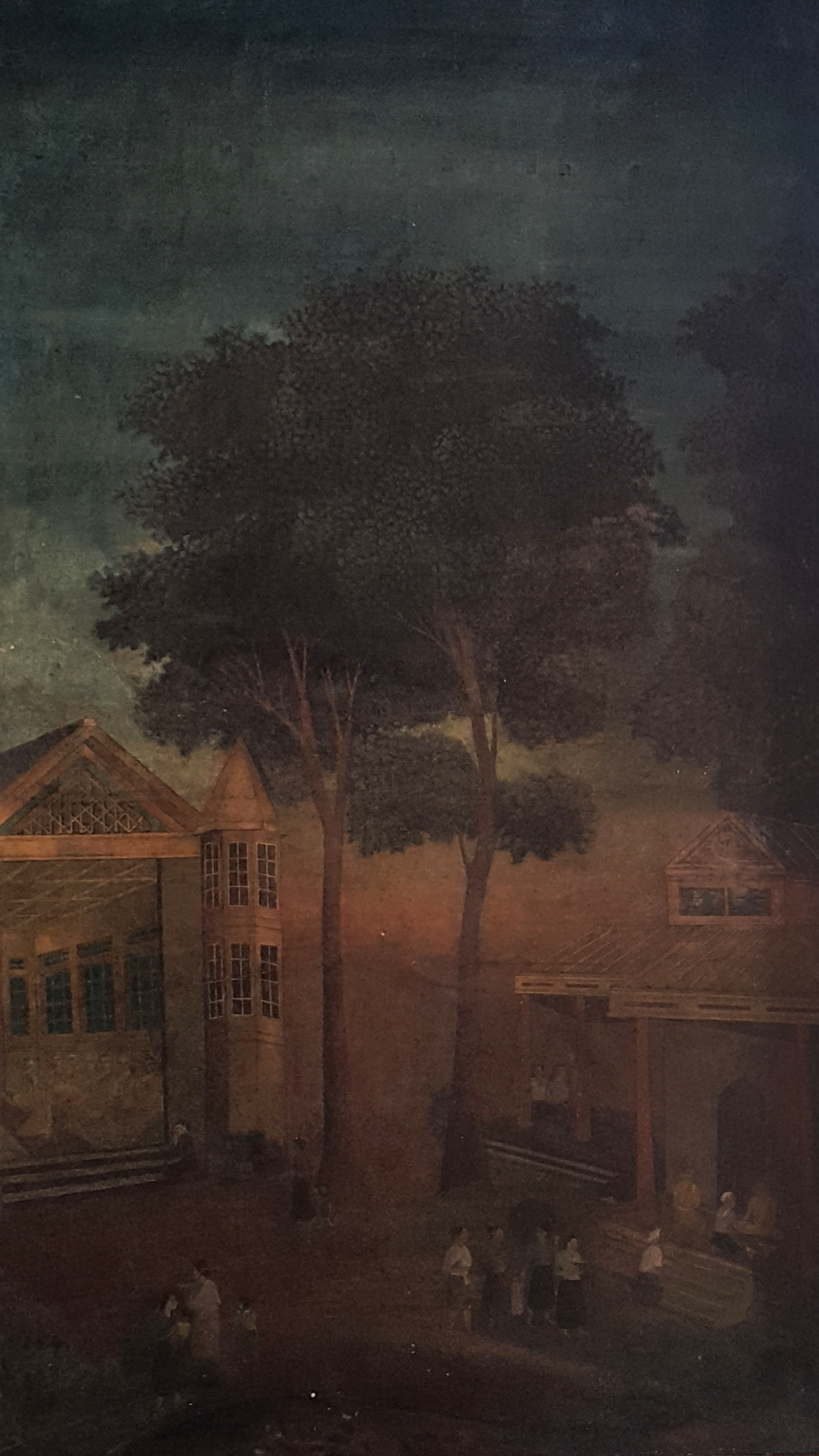

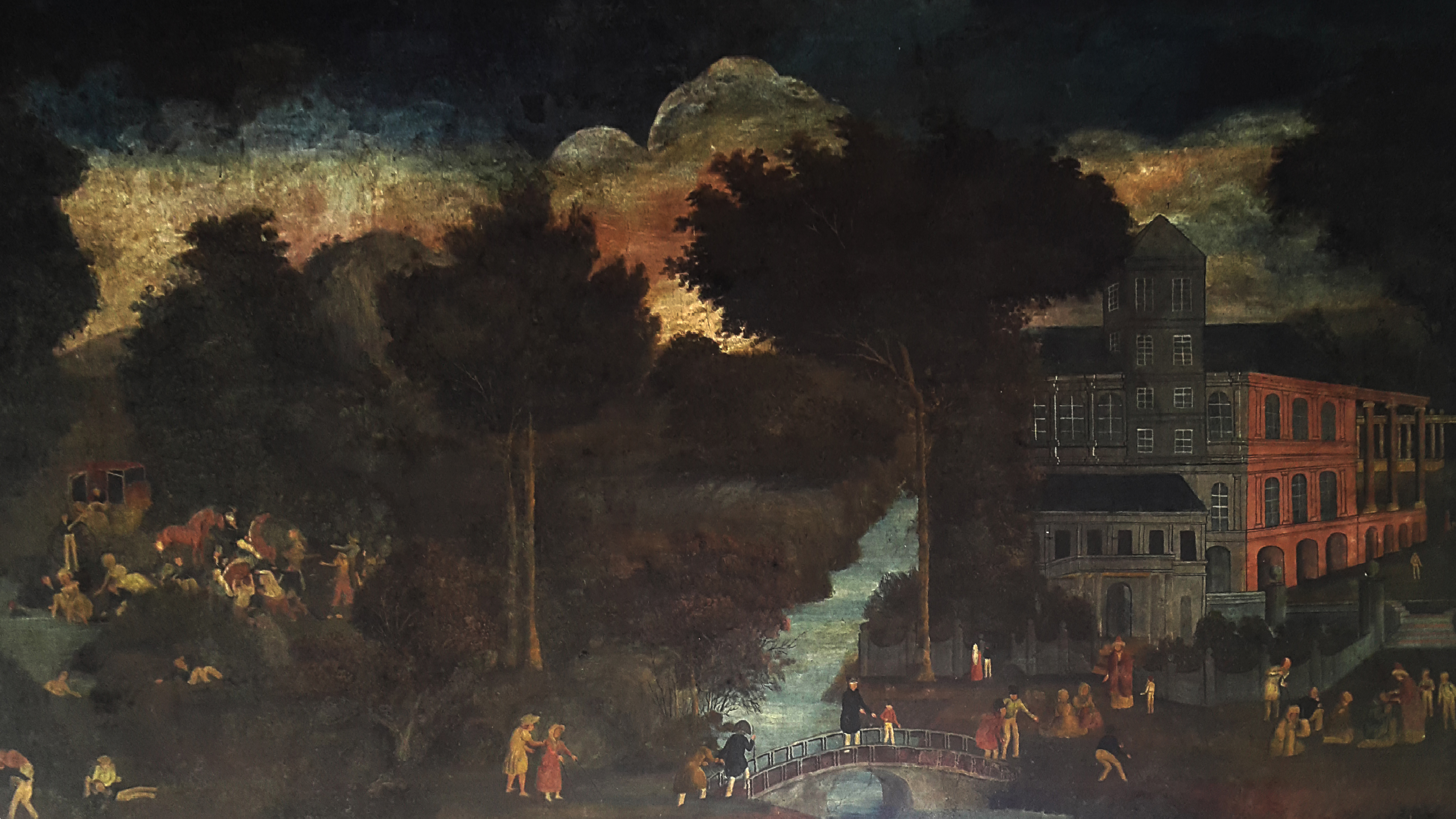

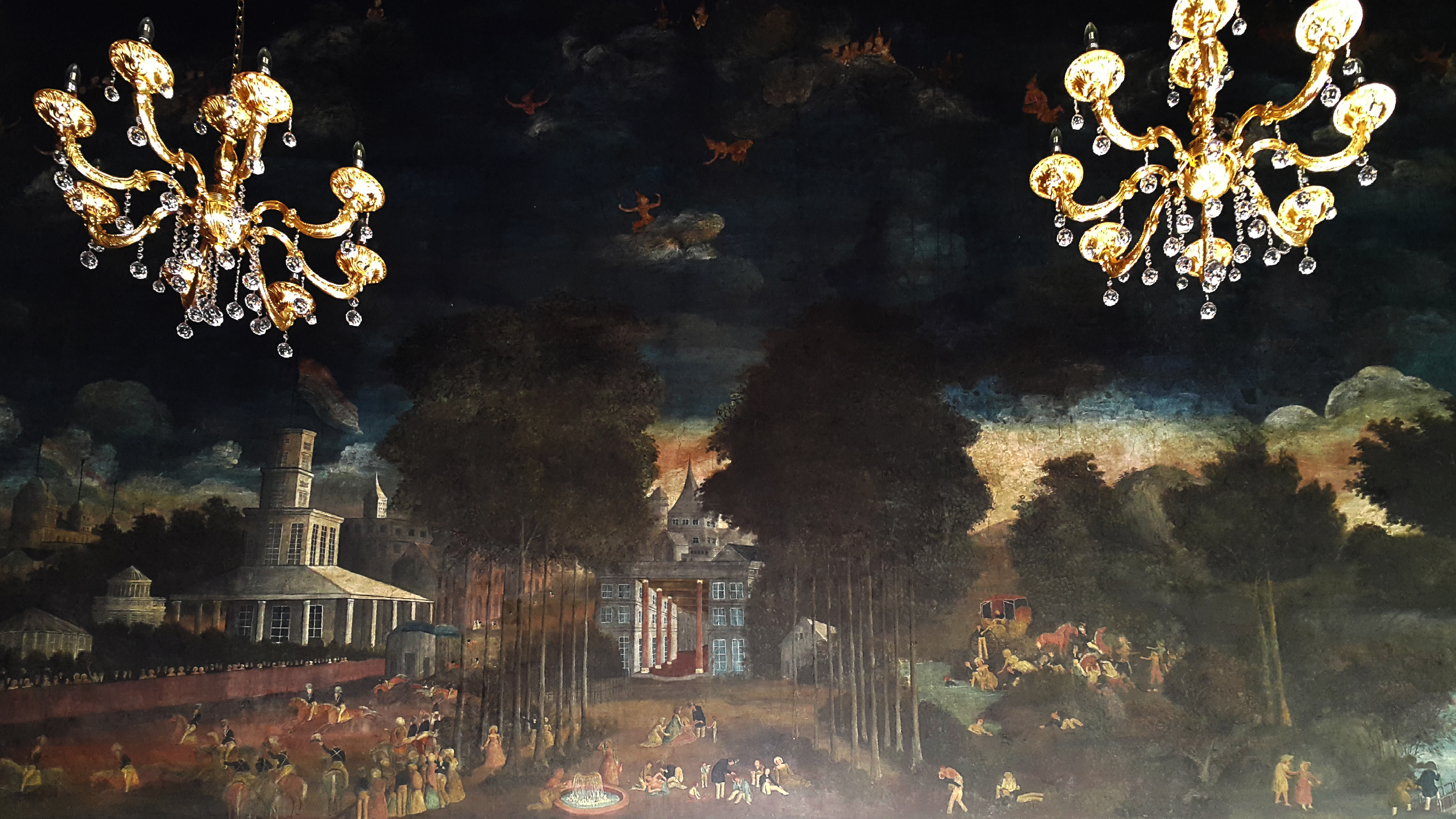

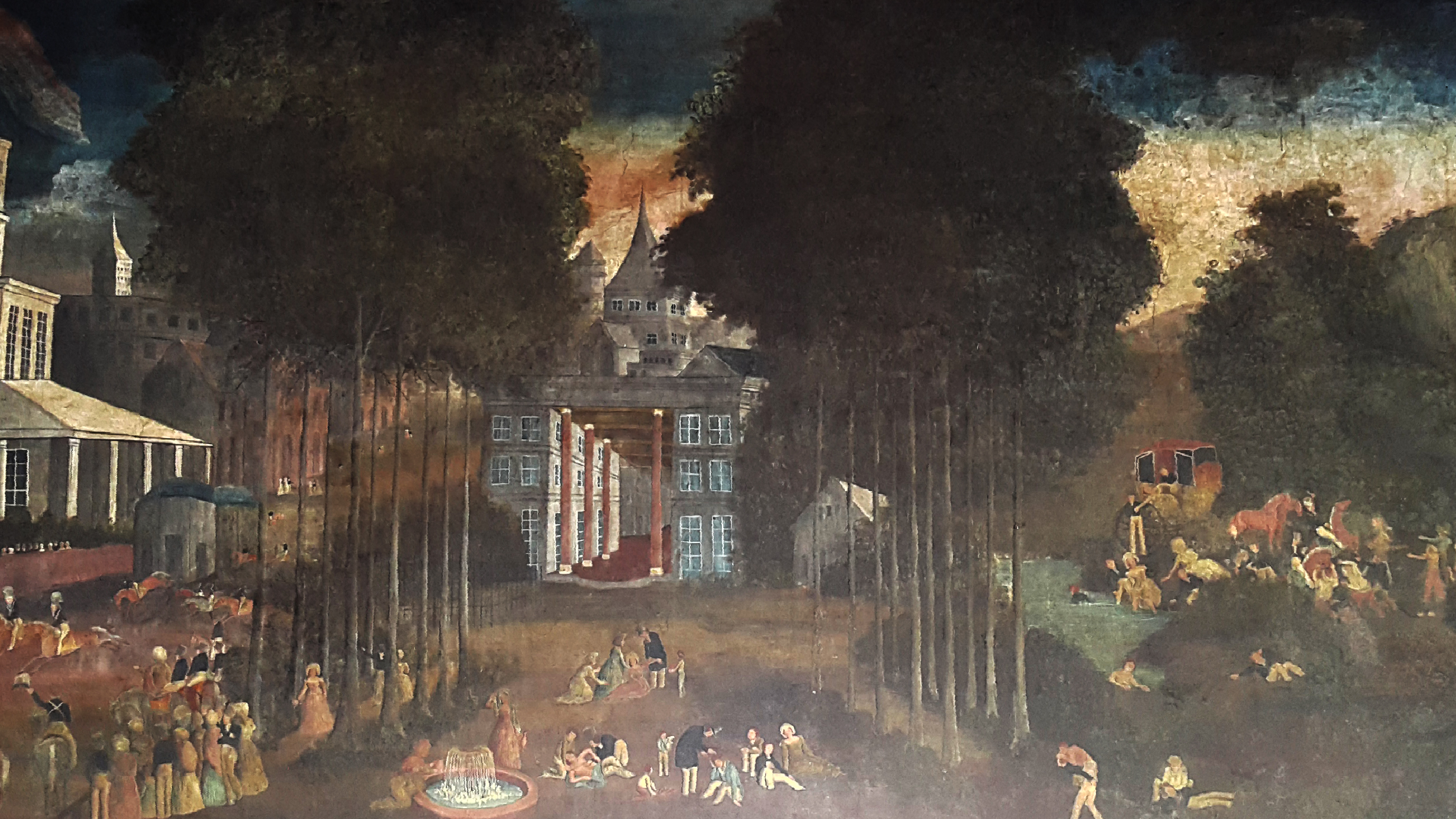

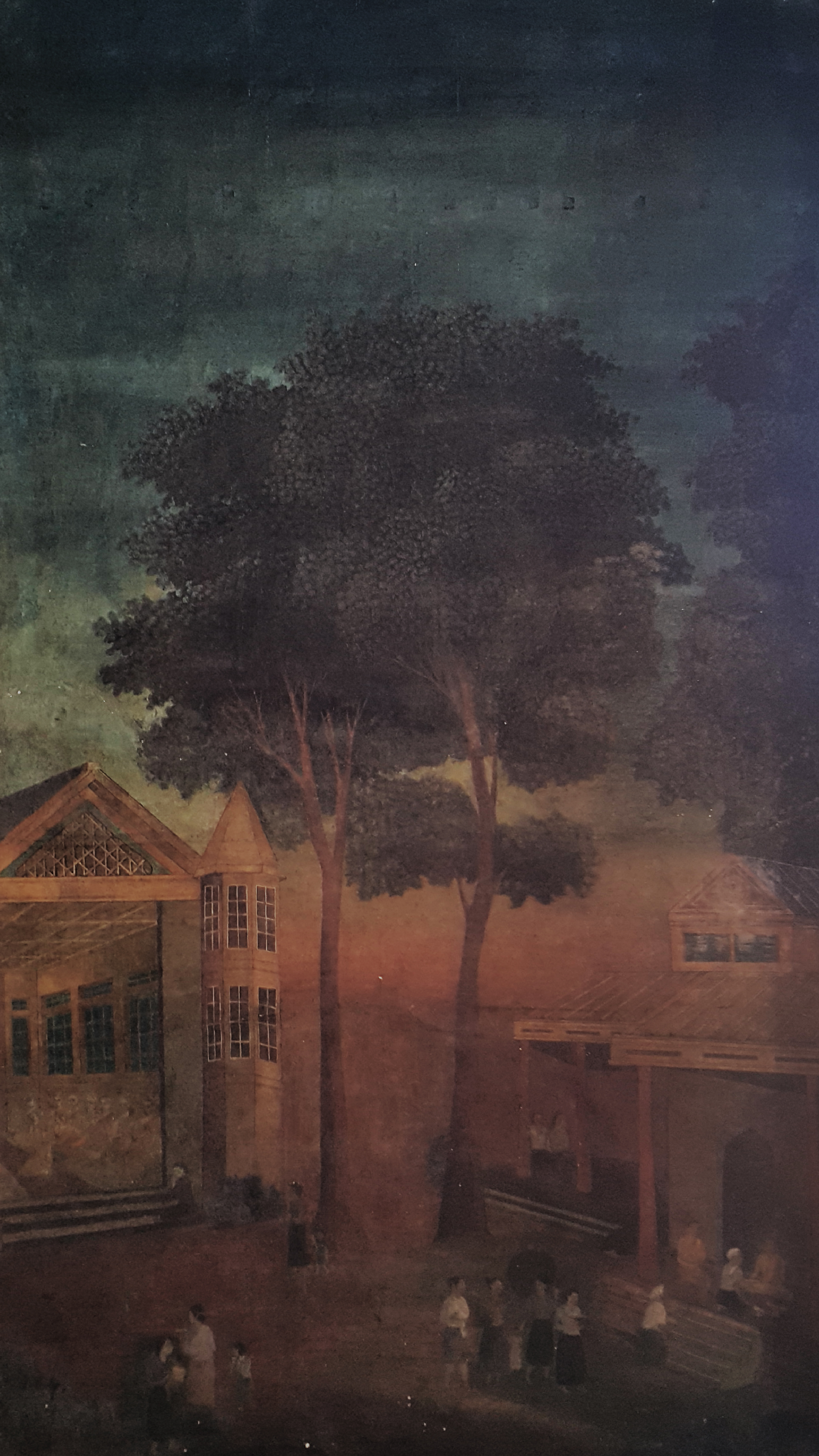

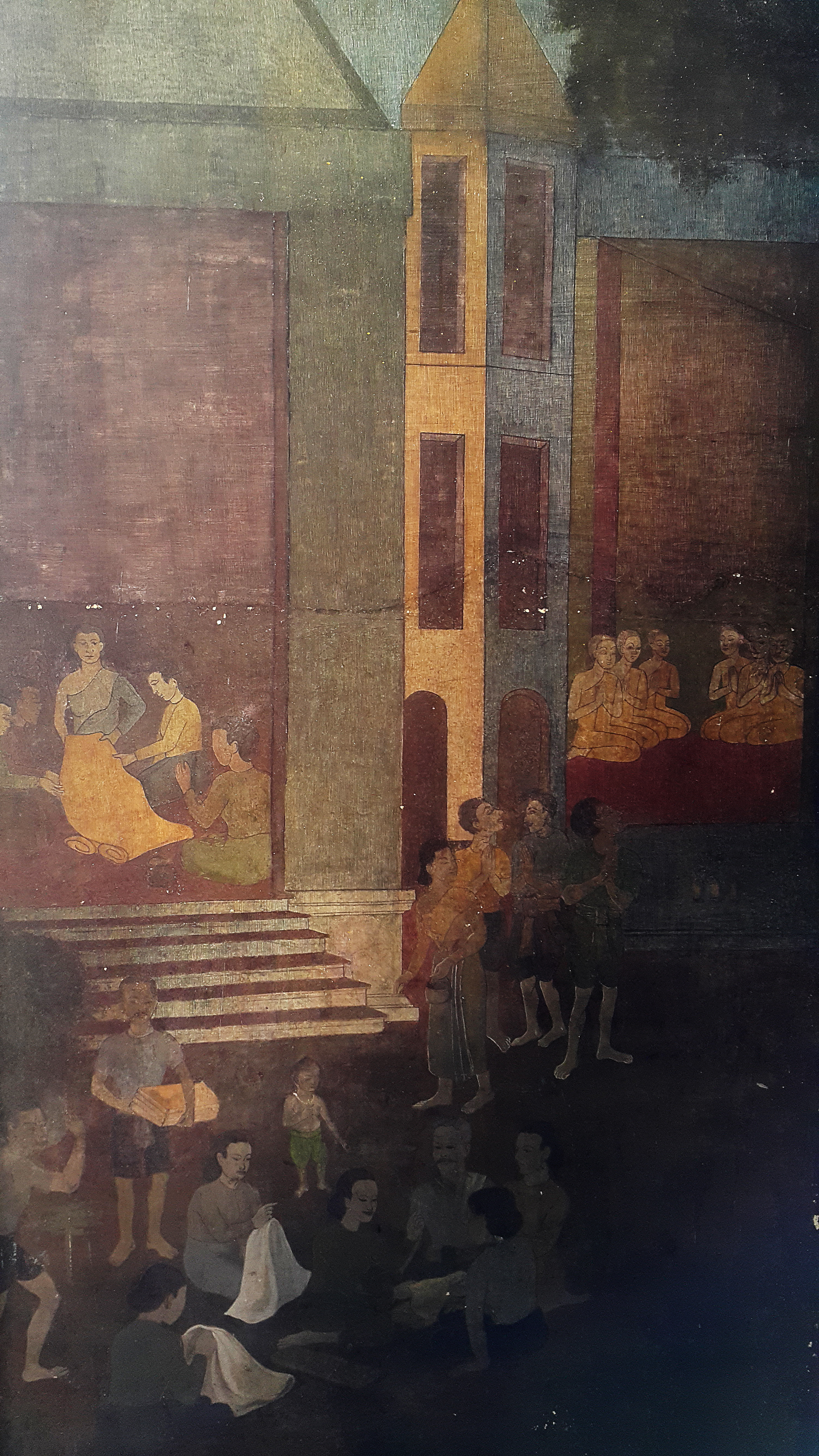

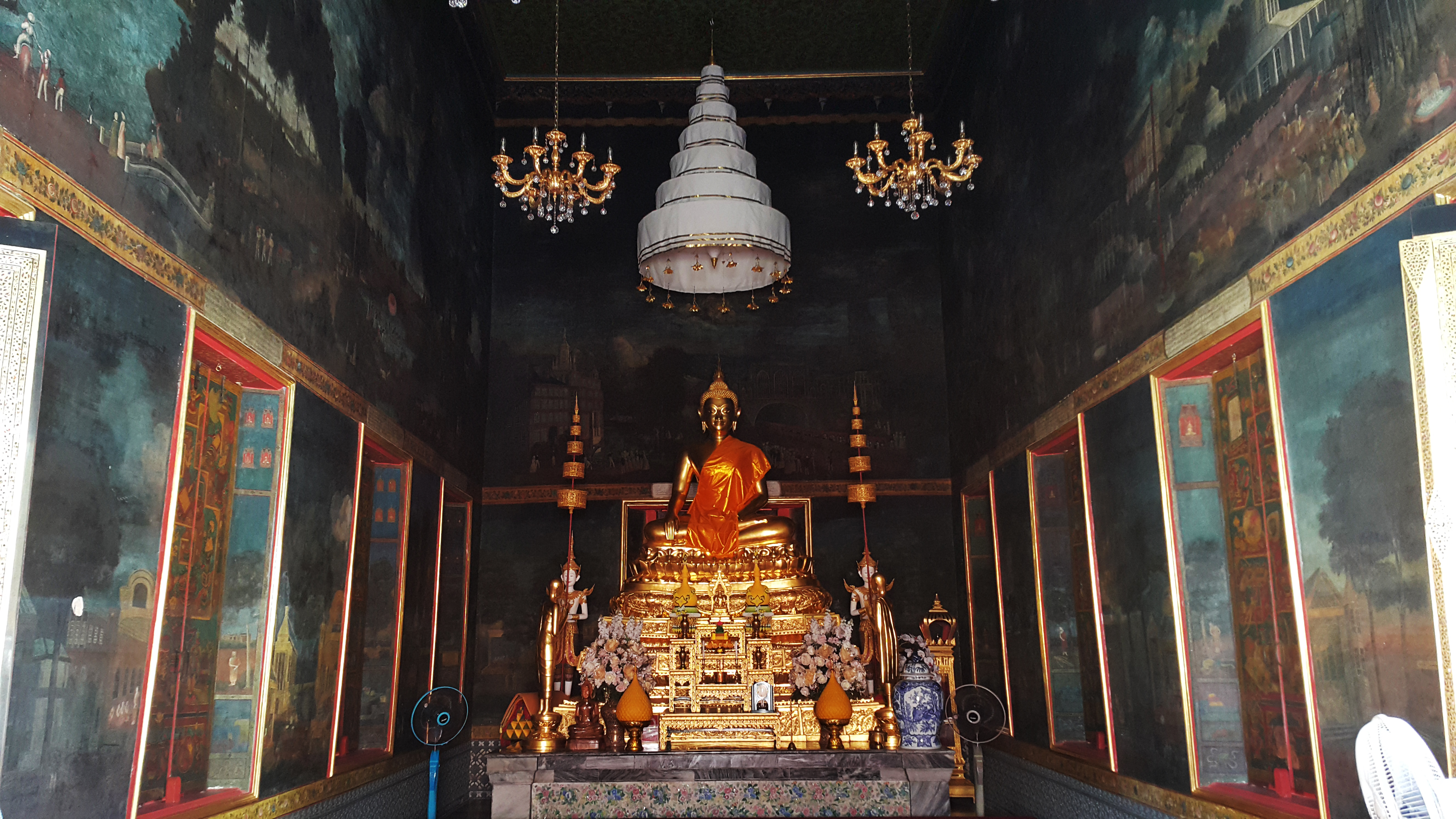
