= Phum khao bin pattern =

Pattern in Thai architecture

The phum khao bin or poom khao bin pattern (Thai: ลายพุ่มข้าวบิณฑ์) is a design which reflects Thai culture because this pattern appears in Thai architecture early as Sukhothai period. According to The Royal Institute Dictionary in 1982, the definition of Poom Khao Bin refers to a pattern of lines look like Poom Khao Bin shape.

The word Poom Khao Bin is derived from two Thai words. Poom refers to bush, while Khao Bin refers to a bowl with a high saucer and sharp tip similar to lotus shape. This pattern basically shows the repetition of the kite, but the detail of the pattern will be different up to the type.

== Origin ==
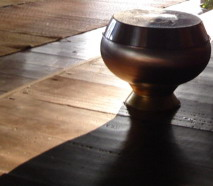
Alms Bowl

In the past, Thai people used 'Khao Bin' to offer rice to the monks, and from this culture Poom Khao Bin pattern is be like the symbol of prosperity because the idea that people whose lived well and happy would bring food to the monk until the rice pile up from the alms bowl.

Nowadays, this bowl with rice point tips is rarely used for offering to the monks because most of them do not use for containing rice. However, it is decorated with flowers such as the globe amaranth flowers and used for giving to someone whose respected but Poom Khao Bin pattern is still being the symbol of prosperity notice from this pattern can be seen in Thai restaurant and Thai ware.

== Design ==
The outer shape of Poom Khao Bin pattern is look like lotus. For the master pattern of Poom Khao Bin, at the middle of the pattern, there are the saparater that have water drop shape but it can be different up to each type of pattern. Around the saparater surrounded by half of Krajang Taoil pattern (Thai: ลายกระจังตาอ้อย) there are only at the top and bottom that have full Krajang Taoil.

== Various ==
Poom Khao Bin pattern can be divided into three types

- Poom Khao Bin
- Poom Khao Bin na sinha (Thai: พุ่มข้าวบิณฑ์หน้าสิงห์)
- Poom Khao Bin Teb Pranom (Thai: พุ่มข้าวบิณฑ์เทพประณม)
