= Burmese–Siamese War (1759–1760) =

Conflict between the Konbuang dynasty of Burma and the Thai kingdom of Ayutthaya

- Part of Burmese–Siamese wars
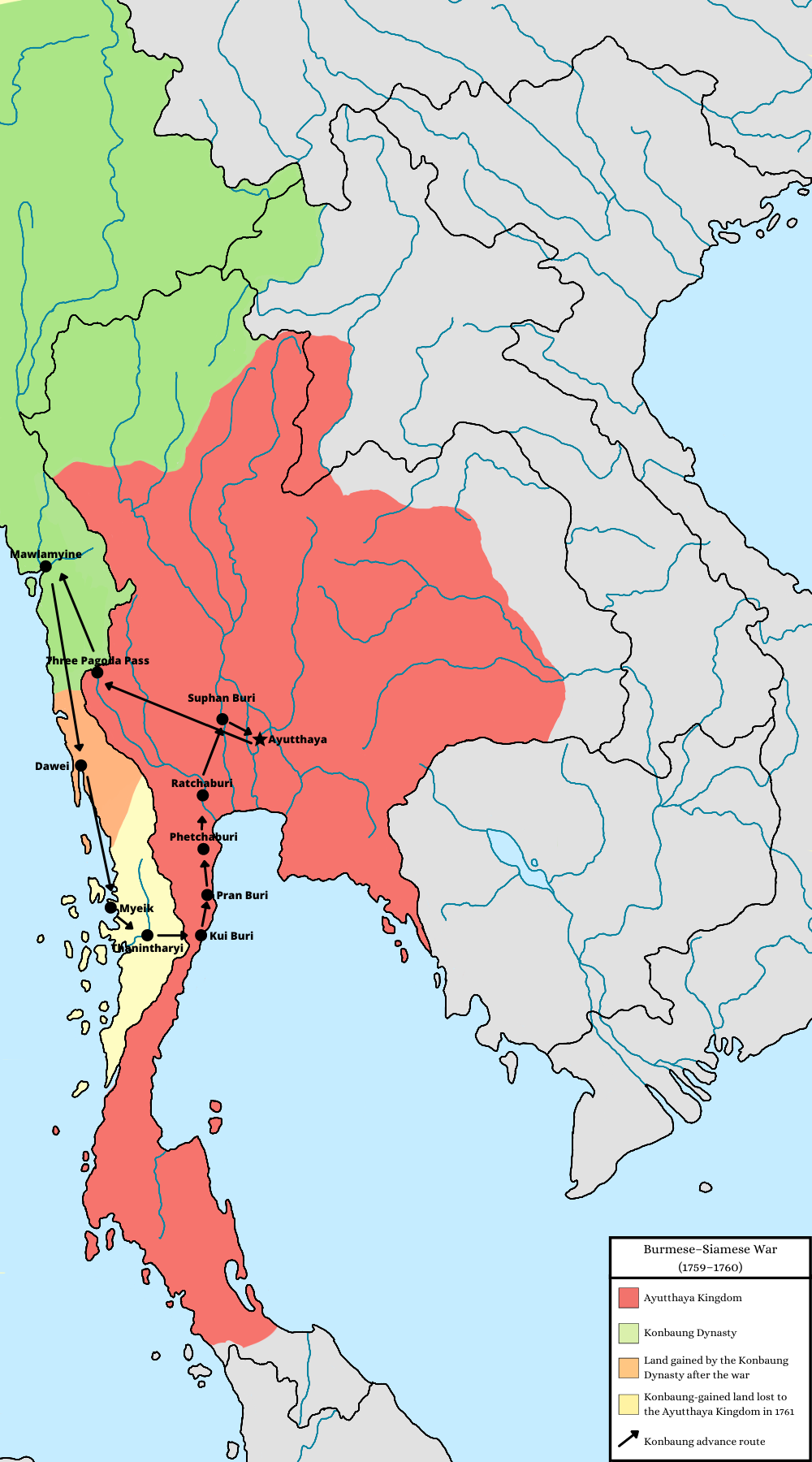
- A map of the Burmese-Siamese War (1759-1760)
Date	December 1759 – May 1760
Location	Tenasserim coast, Gulf of Siam coast, Suphanburi, Ayutthaya
Result	Inconclusive. Burmese gained Dawei and upper Tenasserim but failed to capture Ayutthaya.

Belligerents
Konbaung Kingdom (Burma)	Ayutthaya Kingdom (Siam)

Commanders and leaders
Alaungpaya †; Hsinbyushin; Minkhaung Nawrahta; Minhla Nawrata; Minhla Yaza	Ekkathat; Uthumphon; Chaophraya Kalahom Khlongklaeb †; Phraya Rattanathibet; Phraya Yommaraj; Phraya Ratchawangsan

Units involved
Royal Burmese Army: Shan regiments; Mon regiments; Cassay Horse	Royal Siamese Army

Strength
Invasion force: 40,000 men 3,000 cavalry Rearguard: 6,000 musketeers 500 cavalry	Tenasserim and Gulf of Siam theaters (initial): 27,000 men 1,300 cavalry 200 elephants Gulf of Siam (later): 60,000 men Suphanburi and Ayutthaya: 45,000 men 6,000 cavalry 300 elephants 4,000 musketeers

The Burmese–Siamese War (1759–1760) (Burmese: ယိုးဒယား-မြန်မာစစ် (၁၇၅၉–၁၇၆၀); Thai: สงครามพม่า-สยาม (พ.ศ. 2302–2303)) or Alaungpaya's War (Thai: สงครามพระเจ้าอลองพญา) was the military conflict between the Konbaung dynasty of Burma (Myanmar) and the Ban Phlu Luang Dynasty of the Ayutthaya Kingdom of Siam, in which the Burmese forces under King Alaungpaya of the Konbaung dynasty invaded Siam. After about a century of relative hiatus of Burmese–Siamese conflicts, this war reignited the new round of military conflicts between Burma and Siam that would last for about a century to come.

After the fall of Burmese Toungoo dynasty at the hands of the Mons of Hanthawaddy in 1752, the Burmese resurged powerful under King Alaungpaya who founded the new Konbaung dynasty in 1752. In the course of Burmese reunification, Burmese forces under charismatic leadership of Alaungpaya had gained military experiences, including expulsion of the British and the French from Lower Burma. Burma reconstituted into a militarized polity, whereas Siam, centered on Ayutthaya, had not faced any serious external threats or military conflicts since late seventeenth century and Siamese defense system had been largely in disuse. Siam, through the eighteenth century, had been plagued with internal rebellions, succession disputes and decline of manpower control. Chronic manpower shortage undermined Siamese defense system.

Immediate causes of the war were dispute over the Tenasserim Coast and perceived Siamese support to the Mons of Lower Burma in their insurgency against Burmese rule. King Alaungpaya was provoked by the incident in which Burmese royal ship was seized by the Siamese in September 1759. Siamese authorities at Mergui refused to repatriate a Mon rebel ship, branded as a royal Burmese ship, to Burma. This Burmese military expedition was also driven by the Indic Chakravarti or Cakkavatti ideology, in which Alaungpaya viewed himself as Universal Ruler with boundless military conquests with the goal to bring forth the new epoch of Bodhisattava or Future Buddha.

Alaungpaya and his Burmese forces of 40,000 men left Rangoon to invade Siam in late December 1759, with his second son Prince Thiri Damayaza of Myedu (later King Hsinbyushin) and his childhood friend Minkhaung Nawrahta as vanguard commanders. Going through Martaban, the Burmese vanguard conquered Tavoy in December. After taking the whole Tenasserim Coast, Alaungpaya and his Burmese forces entered Siam crossing the Tenasserim Hills through the Singkhon Pass in early March 1760. The news of Burmese invasion came as a surprise for Ayutthaya, who was unprepared, panicked and disorganized. King Ekkathat sent his inexperienced Siamese forces to face the Burmese at Singkhon Pass, resulting in the Burmese prevail, humiliating Siamese retreat and the desperate heroic stand of Khun Rong Palat Chu well-narrated in Thai nationalistic history.

Ayutthaya adopted the traditional strategy of passive stand inside of Ayutthaya citadel against the invaders, relying on formidable wall of Ayutthaya and arrival of rainy wet season to ward off the invaders. The Burmese swept through Western Siamese towns of Kuiburi, Phetchaburi, Ratchaburi and Suphanburi. The more-capable temple king Uthumphon, who had previously abdicated in 1758 to become a monk, returned to power to assume military commands. In the Battle of Talan or Noi River in late March 1760, impulsivity of Prince Myedu nearly resulted in Burmese defeat as the Siamese fired onto the river-crossing Burmese but timely arrival of Alaungpaya's main forces saved the situation. Siamese commander and Minister of Military, Chaophraya Kalahom Khlongklaeb, was killed in battle.

The Burmese eventually reached the outskirts of Ayutthaya in late March 1760. Alaungpaya took position at Ban Kum or Bangban to the northwest of Ayutthaya, while his vanguard under Minkhaung Nawrahta approached the northern walls of Ayutthaya to attack. The Siamese adhered to the passive defense strategy, convinced that the Burmese were obliged to leave at the advent of rainy season. The Burmese attacked Ayutthaya in April 1760, resulting in gruesome massacre of Ayutthayan people and foreign merchants on the southern moat. Minkhaung Nawrahta fires cannons into the Ayutthaya citadel, damaging structures including Ekkathat's royal residence.

Alaungpaya the Burmese king fell ill in mid-April 1760. His son Prince Myedu and his friend Minkhaung Nawrahta convinced Alaungpaya to retreat. Alaungpaya and his Burmese forces retreated in April 1760, leaving Minkhaung Nawrahta at Ban Kum as rearguard against any possible Siamese pursuits, utterly destroying Siamese pursuing forces. Ayutthaya was thus saved from Burmese conquest as the passive defense strategy worked for one last time, postponing the fall of Ayutthaya for seven years. After a long journey, going back to Burma through the Maesot Pass, the ailing King Alaungpaya died in May 1760 at a place near Martaban, ending the life of an impactful man who, in the course of his eight-year-reign, reunified Burma under his new powerful militaristic regime, sparking a chain of events that would profoundly affect the history of Continental Southeast Asia.

This war laid foundation for the next Burmese invasion of Siam in 1765–1767. The Burmese, particularly Prince Myedu, learned about Siamese strategy and tactics. The death of Alaungpaya was followed by a new round of internal unrests in Burma, including the rebellion of Minkhaung Nawrahta himself in 1760. The new Burmese king Naungdawgyi pacified the unrest by 1762 but died prematurely next year in late 1763. Prince Myedu, son of Alaungpaya and younger brother of Naungdawgyi, eventually ascended the Burmese throne as King Hsinbyushin in 1763. Hsinbyushin viewed the conquest of Ayutthaya as due accomplishment unattained by his father Alaungpaya so he was determined to finish the mission. Hsinbyushin innovated and conveyed his new strategy to his commanders sent into Siam in 1765, effectively circumventing and undoing traditional Siamese defense strategy, leading to the eventual destructive fall of Ayutthaya in 1767.

== Background ==
=== Summary of Burmese–Mon–Siamese conflicts ===
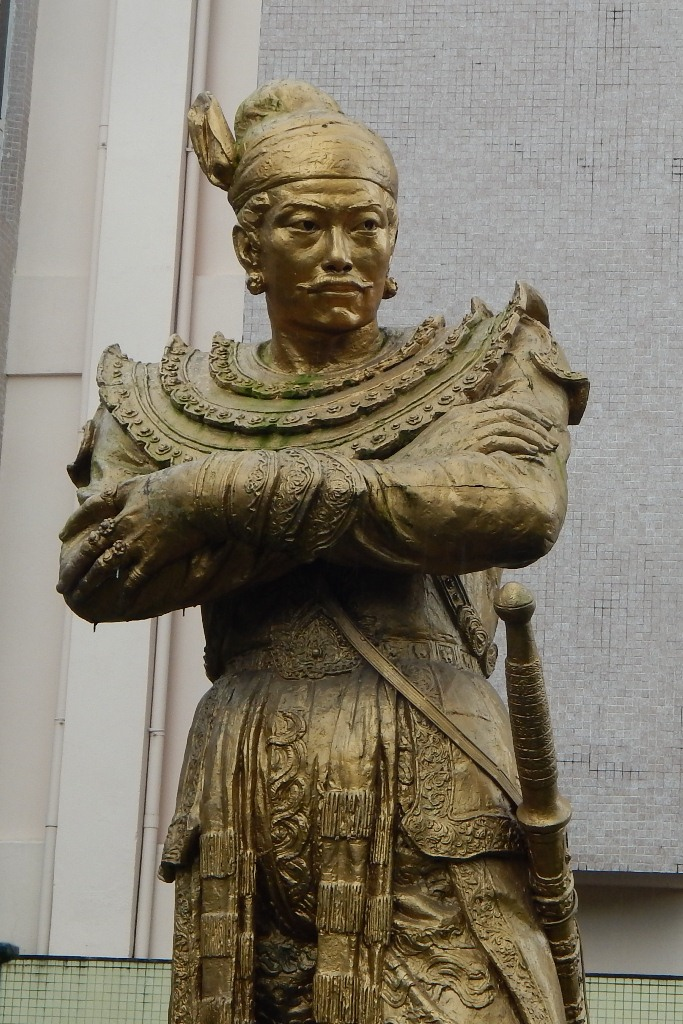
King Bayinnaung (r. 1550–1581) of Burmese Toungoo dynasty is known in Thailand as "Conqueror of Ten Directions" from a popular Thai novel published in 1932.

Burmese King Tabinshweti of Toungoo dynasty conquered the Mon Kingdom of Hanthawaddy in Lower Burma in 1539. However, the Mons soon rebelled and had to be reconquered by King Bayinnaung in 1551. Burmese kings of Toungoo dynasty established their royal capital at Pegu or Hanthawaddy, which had been the Mon royal seat, respecting Mon culture. In 1555, Bayinnaung conquered the Shan-occupied Ava and Upper Burma, uniting Burma under a single rule for the first time since the Pagan kingdom. Bayinnaung went on to conquer Lanna Chiang Mai (1558), Manipur (1560) and Tavoy (1562). In 1563, King Bayinnaung led his Burmese armies to invade neighboring Siamese Kingdom of Ayutthaya. King Thammaracha of Phitsanulok, a Siamese vassal king, allied with the Burmese king. Bayinnaung then went on to lay siege on Ayutthaya, resulting in the surrender of Ayutthaya in 1564. However, conflicts between Ayutthaya and Burmese-backed Phitsanulok prompted Bayinnaung to send another invasion force to attack Ayutthaya. Ayutthaya fell to Burmese invaders in 1569. Bayinnaung appointed Thammaracha as King of Ayutthaya and his vassal. During his reign, Burmese king Bayinnaung expanded his kingdom to unprecedented territorial size and influence. Bayinnaung appointed his own son, Nawrahta Minsaw, to be King of Chiang Mai and ruler over Lanna.

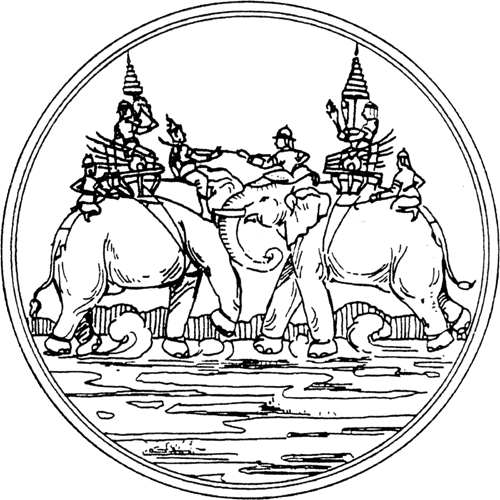
Seal of modern Suphanburi Province depicting the Battle of Nong Sarai in 1593 when Siamese prince Naresuan killed the Burmese crown prince Mingyi Swa in battle.

Bayinnaung died in 1581, leaving the throne to his son Nanda Bayin. Burma then entered a period of decline. Naresuan broke his Siam kingdom free from Burmese domination in 1584. In 1586, Nanda Bayin himself marched Burmese forces to attack and lay siege on Ayutthaya in retaliation but failed to reconquer Ayutthaya. After 1587, Burmese forces would not reach Ayutthayan outskirts again for the next two hundred years (until 1760). In 1592, Nanda Bayin sent his son the crown prince Mingyi Swa to invade Siam. Naresuan intercepted the Burmese at Western frontiers near Suphanburi, leading to the Battle of Nong Sarai in 1593, in which Naresuan prevailed over Burmese invaders and the Burmese crown prince was killed in battle. After the victory, Siam went on offensives, reclaiming Tavoy and Tenasserim in 1593 and taking control of Martaban in 1594. Burma disintegrated into competing princely regimes of Ava, Prome and Toungoo. Even King Nawrahta Minsaw of Chiang Mai submitted to Naresuan, bringing Lanna under Ayutthayan domination. The Burmese Prince of Toungoo, in collaboration with Arakan Kingdom, successfully seized Pegu the Burmese capital in 1599. Naresuan embarked on his grand campaign to invade Lower Burma in 1600. Prince of Toungoo brought Burmese king Nanda Bayin to his hometown at Toungoo, leaving the Arakanese to freely plunder and burn down Pegu. Naresuan followed to Toungoo, laying siege on the city but did not succeed and turned back. Nanda Bayin the Burmese king himself was assassinated in 1600 by Nat Shin Naung, son of the Toungoo prince.

After the death of Nanda Bayin, Burma descended into civil war with regional regimes sprang up at Ava, Prome, Toungoo and Syriam. In 1603, Prince Nyaungyan of Ava attacked Shan States, which were allies of Siam. Naresuan led Siamese armies to support the Shans but died on his way in 1605. Nyaungyan also died in 1605 during his Shan campaign, succeeded by his son Anaukpetlun. From Ava, Anaukpetlun conquered all of his rival regional regimes, uniting Burma again under his rule. In 1613, Anaukpetlun reestablished Pegu as Burmese royal capital. The new Burmese king also reconquered Martaban, Tavoy (1614) and Chiang Mai (1615) from Siam. After this, Burmese–Siamese conflicts cooled down and reached stalemate, with Burma being in control of Lanna, Martaban and Tavoy and Siam controlling Tenasserim. King Thalun moved Burmese capital from Pegu in Lower Burma to Ava in Upper Burma in 1636, The Mons of Lower Burma were then neglected by the Burmese court, allowing them to be more autonomous. In 1660, Qing China invaded Burma in search for Southern Ming Yongli Emperor who had taken refuge in Burma. The panicked Lanna King of Chiang Mai requested aid from King Narai of Ayutthaya. Burma conscripted Mon people to fight Chinese invaders, leading to Mon rebellion at Martaban in 1661. King Narai led Siamese forces north to Lanna but the Chiang Mai king annulled this alliance as the war turned to Burmese favor. Burmese king Pindale sent Burmese armies to subjugate the Mon rebellion, proceeding to invade Western Siam through the Three Pagodas Pass. The Siamese repelled Burmese invaders in 1661 at Saiyok near Kanchanaburi. King Narai conquered Chiang Mai in late 1661. Siam retaliated by attacking Tavoy up to Martaban on Tenasserim Coast in 1662. However, Siam did not seek to permanently occupy Lanna and the Mon lands so these Siamese conquests reverted back to Burmese rule.

=== Decline and Fall of Toungoo dynasty ===
In 1704, King Charairongba of Meitei Kangleipak Kingdom married off his sister Chakpa Makhao Ngambi to Burmese king Sanay. However, Sanay reportedly mistreated Chakpa Makhao Ngambi, not making her his chief queen as promised. Charairongba then died with a broken heart in 1709, instructing his son and successor Pamheiba to avenge Burma. Pamheiba, the new king of Kangleipak, under influence of Indian guru Shantidas Goswami, converted his kingdom to Hindu Vaishnavism, renamed his kingdom Manipur and renamed himself with a Persianate name Gharib Niwaz. In 1716, the new Burmese king Taninganway sent his envoys asking for a Manipuri princess to marry. Gharib Niwaz, remembering the grudges of his father, was offended by this request. Gharib Niwaz sent his forces to ambush the Burmese envoys, leading to Burmese–Manipuri Wars. Gharib Niwaz led his Manipuri armies to invade and plunder Northwestern Burmese towns along the Chindwin and Mu rivers including Myedu, Tabayin and Mingin. Repeated Manipuri invasions weakened Burma. In 1727, Lanna Chiang Mai broke free from Burmese rule and the Shan State of Mogaung did the same in 1734 with the help of Manipur. Indian Brahmins also told Gharib Niwaz that he should bath in the sacred water of Irrawaddy River, where the Burmese royal capital of Ava situated. The most devastating invasion came in 1739 when Gharib Niwaz seized and burnt down Sagaing, which was just opposite of Ava on the Irrawaddy. Gharib Niwaz, however, did not proceed to attack Ava but instead performed sacred bathing ritual in the Irrawaddy river. Maha Damayaza Dipati, the last Burmese king of Toungoo dynasty, reached a truce with Gharib Niwaz in 1740 with the Manipuri king withdrawing.

After the transfer of Burmese capital from Pegu to Ava in 1635, Burmese court had been sending Myowun or governors to govern Pegu, also called Hanthawaddy, over the Mons in Lower Burma. The Mons, however, had been largely neglected by the Burmese court and they strove for independence. In 1737, a Burmese official Maung Tha Aung became the Myowun of Pegu. Maung Tha Aung imposed heavy taxation on the Mons and became unpopular. In 1740, when the Burmese court of Ava was dealing with devastating Manipuri invasion, Maung Tha Aung took this opportunity to rebel and declared himself a Minlaung or pretender. Maung Tha Aung, however, received no support from local Mon populace. King Damayaza of Burma sent his uncle to successfully subjugate and execute Maung Tha Aung the unpopular governor. Burmese court appointed another governor to Pegu but the Mons had enough with Burmese rule. Recent Burmese failures encouraged the Mons to arise. The Mons found cooperation with the Gwe Shans (Shans or Karens who had migrated from Karen Hills to Burma) in their uprising against Burma in 1740. The uprising was led by a Buddhist monk and Minlaung millenarian pretender Smim Htaw (Ethnic origin of Smim Htaw is uncertain. Mon chronicles state that Smim Htaw was of the Gwe Shans but Burmese sources point out that Smim Htaw was a son of a fugitive Burmese prince). Thorasengmu, a Peguan official, murdered the new Pegu governor and declared Smim Htaw the King of Pegu, thus restoring the long-defunct Hanthawaddy Kingdom of the Mons in Lower Burma. Smim Htaw made Thorasengmu his prime minister with the title Binnya Dala and married his daughter.

Smim Htaw proceeded to attack Prome to the north. Burmese governors of Martaban and Tavoy, in their panic of Mon insurgency, fled to seek shelter at Ayutthaya in 1742 under protection of King Borommakot. Burmese king sent envoys to Ayutthaya in 1744, requesting repatriation of the two Burmese governors. Borommakot reciprocated by dispatching Siamese envoys in 1745 to bring these two governors back to Burma. Siamese ambassadors declared open support to Burma against the Mons. Smim Htaw, fearing Siamese attacks in his rear, retreated from Prome. According to Thai chronicles, Burmese–Siamese relations by this time went amicably but, in Burmese perspective, the Burmese court was suspicious about Siam's true allegiance.

Smim Htaw the King of Pegu had a queen who was a daughter of his prime minister Binnya Dala. In 1744, in response to Siamese support to Burma, Smim Htaw sought alliance with Lanna by marrying a daughter of King Ong Kham of Chiang Mai as his second queen. This marriage, however, upset the first queen as Smim Htaw favored his Lanna queen over his first one. The first queen relayed her grievances to her father Binnya Dala, who then conspired against Smim Htaw. In 1746, while Smim Htaw was venturing out to catch some elephants, Binnya Dala seized power in Pegu, declaring himself new king (Burmese sources suggested that Binnya Dala might originally be a Shan, perhaps Northern Thai, elephant mahout from Chiang Mai). Binnya Dala was a better expansionist than Smim Htaw as he sent his brother Upayaza to successfully took Prome and Toungoo in 1746. In 1747, Smim Htaw rallied his Karen forces in attempt to reclaim his throne but was defeated and took refuge in Ayutthaya, Siam. In 1748, King Gharib Niwaz abdicated the throne of Manipur in favor of his son Chitsai. Next year, in 1749, Gharib Niwaz marched his army to Ava in order to marry off his niece to the Burmese king. In 1750, the new Manipur king Chitsai expelled his father the abdicated king out of Imphal. Gharib Niwaz ended up seeking shelter at Ava with the Burmese king with whom he had reconciled.

In 1751, Hanthawaddy court signed a treaty with French representative Sieur de Bruno, allowing the French to establish a military post at Syriam, while the Mons obtaining French firearms. The Mons then had the advantage of updated European weaponry over the Burmese. Finally in 1751, Binnya Dala sent the Mon forces of 27,000 men under the command of his younger brother Upayaza with his another sibling Talaban as vanguard along the Irrawaddy north to attack the Burmese royal seat of Ava. The Mon forces reached Ava in early 1752. After many defeats, manpower and supplies dwindling, Ava eventually capitulated in March 1752. Damayaza the last king of Toungoo dynasty surrendered without resistance. Upayaza took the Burmese king and his family down south to Pegu, leaving Talaban to be in charge of Ava, which was burnt to the grounds. Centuries-old Toungoo dynasty was overthrown by the Mons, who conquered their former overlord – Burma. Gharib Niwaz the abdicated Manipur king, who had been staying in Ava, left Ava to return to Manipur but was assassinated midway by the agents of his own son Chitsai. Upayaza the Mon prince, convinced that Upper Burma had been thoroughly pacified, was more concerned about prospective Siamese retaliation from Tenasserim than potential Burmese resurgence in Upper Burma.

=== Reign of Borommakot ===
Phetracha ascended the Siamese throne in aftermath of the Siamese Revolution of 1688, establishing the Ban Phlu Luang dynasty, facing regional rebellions at Nakhon Ratchasima in 1689, 1699–1700 and at Nakhon Si Thammarat in 1700 and 1704–1705, which took great efforts to quell. At the death of Phetracha in 1703, his son Phra Chao Suea succeeded the throne and executed his half-brother and rival claimant Prince Phra Khwan. After Phra Chao Suea, his son King Thaisa ascended the throne in 1709. Thaisa made his younger brother Prince Phon the Wangna Prince of the Front Palace and heir presumptive. As internal instability had plagued Siam, Siamese court sought to reduce the powers of nobility and regional governors in order to stabilize politics but the opposite actually came true – royal princes and nobles gained more power and Ayutthaya lost control of its periphery. Government structure of Late Ayutthaya served to prevent internal rebellions rather than to defend against Burmese invasions, which had become a distant past memory. Meanwhile, Siamese trade with Qing China flourished. As Southern China suffered from rice shortages, Siam capitalized this situation by daring the Haijin or Chinese ban on overseas trade by sending rice in tributary junks to trade at Canton in 1722. Emperor Kangxi allowed the import of cheaper Siamese rice into ports of Canton, Amoy and Ningbo, under the guise of tributary submissions, to relieve famines. This might partially lead to Emperor Yongzheng lifting the Haijin ban in 1727. This Sino–Siamese commercial-tributary relations generated revenue for Siamese royal court and private merchants alike. In 1730, Prince Phon of the Front Palace discovered an anti-Buddhist Christian catechism composed by French missionary Louis Laneau, resulting in King Thaisa banning Christian proselytizing through Siamese alphabets and conversion of native Siamese people to Christianity. Siamese court erected stone steles at Catholic seminaries at Ayutthaya and Mergui to enforce this edict.

On his deathbed in 1733, King Thaisa gave the throne to his two sons instead of his younger brother Prince Phon, who had been the Wangna and technically heir presumptive, resulting in a civil war in Ayutthaya between the uncle and his nephews. Prince Phon initially suffered setbacks to the verge of defeat but his subordinate Khun Chamnan volunteered to rally against the enemies in last resort. Khun Chamnan valiantly marched against the two princes and miraculously prevailed. Two sons of Thaisa, claimants to the throne, were captured and executed. Prince Phon ascended the Siamese throne as King Borommakot in 1733. Borommakot rewarded his meritorious subject Khun Chamnan with title Chaophraya Chamnan Borirak and position of Phrakhlang or trade minister as de facto Prime Minister of Siam with immense powers. Borommakot attempted to solve the chronic problem of princely conflicts by creation of Krom or manpower regiment assigned to each prince as the method to control manpower allocation among the princes. Conscripted commoner males preferred to become Phrai Som (princely servants) in the Kroms instead of Phrai Luang (direct royal servants), who were subjected to more labor tasks. Moreover, Sino–Siamese rice trade continued to expand, leading to growth of export-oriented private rice plantations. These proto-middle class Siamese people, who had enriched themselves from trades, avoided royal conscriptions to partake in more profitable activities. Phrai Luang – effective available manpower – was reduced in numbers. Long hiatus from external threats and manpower shortage crippled Siamese defense system. In 1742, Siamese court issued a campaign to round up ten thousands of conscription evaders.

The reign of King Borommakot coincided with last years of Burmese Toungoo dynasty. In 1742, Burmese governors of Martaban and Tavoy fled the Mon insurrection to seek shelter in Ayutthaya. These Burmese governors told Borommakot, in derogatory words, that Smim Htaw the King of Hanthawaddy was of 'lowborn' Gwe Shan origin. Burmese king Damayaza sent envoys to Ayutthaya in 1744, asking for the return of the two Burmese governors. Borommakot responded by sending a diplomatic mission to Ava in 1745 to repatriate the Burmese governors. Siamese envoys declared open support to Burma in this Burmese–Mon conflict. Siam considered the rising Mon kingdom in nearer Lower Burma to be a greater threat than crumbling Ava Kingdom in farther Upper Burma. Smim Htaw attempted to normalize relations with Siam by sending a request for one of any daughters of Borommakot to marry in 1745. Borommakot, however, was greatly offended by this request as he considered Smim Htaw to be a 'forest-dweller' aspiring to become royalty.

In 1746, Smim Htaw was dethroned by his chancellor Binnya Dala and ended up taking refuge in Ayutthaya in 1747. The Siamese king imprisoned Smim Htaw for his previous offense of asking for Siamese princess for marriage. Binnya Ran, a Mon military man loyal to Smim Htaw, also sought shelter in Siam with 400 Mon people. Borommakot granted Phosamton rice fields north of Ayutthaya (modern Bang Pahan district) for the Mon refugees to settle. Binnya Dala sent emissaries to Ayutthaya in 1748, coming for Smim Htaw and urging Borommakot not to shelter his nemesis. Borommakot, not wanting to send Smim Htaw to his doom, instead sent Smim Htaw off to China on a Chinese junk. Smim Htaw, however, managed to disembark somewhere in Vietnam and made his journey to Chiang Mai in 1749, joining his wife there. In 1750, Smim Htaw asked his father-in-law King of Chiang Mai for Lanna forces to reclaim his Hanthawaddy kingdom but was refused. Perhaps hearing about this, Binnya Ran stole Siamese firearms and gathered some Mon men, taking off to the west in 1750 to support Smim Htaw but was intercepted and captured by Siamese authorities. Borommakot then considered Binnya Ran a rebel and had him executed along with his Mon followers.

=== Rise of Konbaung dynasty ===
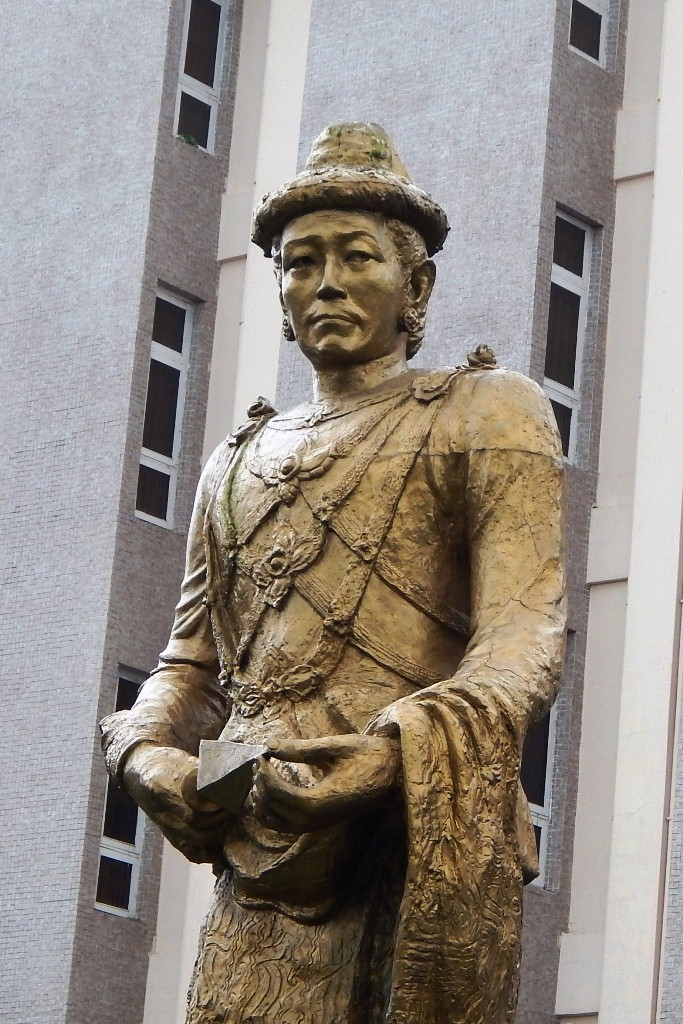
Alaungpaya, founder of Burmese Konbaung dynasty, reunified Burma, defeated the Mons of Hanthawaddy and invaded Ayutthaya in 1759. He died in 1760 during his return form the campaign in Siam.

Aung Zeiya was born in 1716 at Moksobo village to the northwest of Burmese capital of Ava – the area that had been subjected to frequent Manipuri raids. He grew up to become the Myothugyi or village headman of Moksobo. When the Mons besieged Ava in early 1752, Aung Zeiya had been the governor and tax collector of forty villages under his jurisdiction. Upayaza the Mon commander demanded submission from local Burmese leaders in Upper Burma. Aung Zeiya and his retinue were one of many communities in Upper Burma that stayed defiant to the Mon conquerors. In February 1752, about one month before the eventual fall of Ava, Aung Zeiya declared himself Alaungpaya or Future Buddha Bodhisattava, becoming a Minlaung or royal claimant and founding the Konbaung dynasty. Ava fell to the Mons in March 1752. Upayaza was more concerned of possible Siamese attacks from Tenasserim so, after the conquest of Ava, Upayaza ordered all of the Mon forces to return to Pegu in Lower Burma, leaving some forces under Talaban to occupy Ava. This redeployment of Hanthawaddy troops proved a critical turning point in Burmese history as it gave nascent Upper Burmese resistance groups much needed breathing room. The Hanthawaddy command left less than 10,000 men to pacify all of Upper Burma. Historians call the redeployment premature, pointing out that the Siamese threat was never as grave as any counterforce that could rise from Upper Burma, the traditional home of political power in Burma.

Alaungpaya resisted and killed Mon officials sent to subjugate him in May 1752. In June, Talaban himself led a Mon army to put down this undaunting Burmese resistance but was too defeated. Pegu's inattention to Upper Burma allowed Alaungpaya time to subjugate petty regimes and unify Upper Burma under his rule. Alaungpaya renamed his village Shwebo with the official gilded name of Yadana Theingka (Rattana Singha), digging moats and erecting walls, transforming his village into a royal capital and citadel in June 1753. In late 1753, Alaungpaya assigned his seventeen-year-old son Prince Thado Minsaw (later King Hsinbyushin) to lay siege on Ava. Thado Minsaw finally took Ava in January 1754. Upayaza and Talaban arrived from Hanthawaddy in attempts to reconquer Ava but was repelled. Alaungpaya expelled Talaban from Prome in 1755. Merely three years after the Mon conquest of Ava in 1752, the Mons lost their grounds in Burma to this vehement Burmese resurgence.

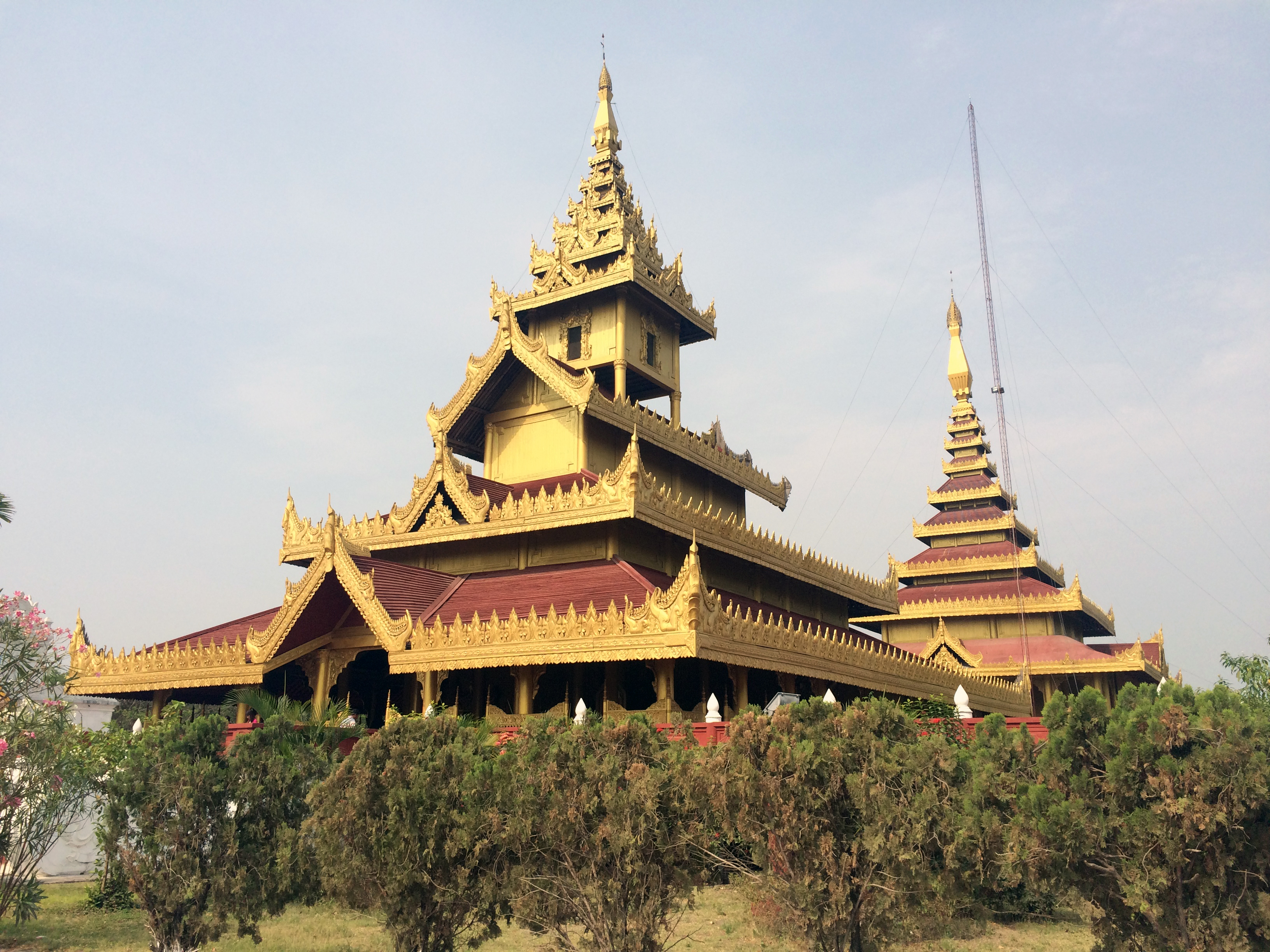
Alaungpaya built Shwebo and Shwebo Palace on his native Moksobo village in 1753, serving as royal seat of the new Konbaung dynasty. Current structures were constructed in 1999.

After taking control of all Upper Burma down to Prome, Alaungpaya made rapid concentrated offensives on Lower Burma. Alaungpaya, however, soon realized that he had one disadvantage. The Mons had signed a treaty with French representative Sieur de Bruno in 1751, allowing the French to establish themselves in Syriam and exchange for supplying Hanthawaddy with European firearms. In order to beat Pegu, Alaungpaya also had to acquire European weapons. Upon attacking Dagon in 1755, Alaungpaya request supply of firearms from the British at Negrais (modern Hainggyi at the mouth of Pathein River). British response to Alaungpaya's request took long time and Alaungpaya conquered Dagon first in mid-1755, renaming the city 'Rangoon' ("End of Strife"). Alaungpaya proceeded to attack Syriam, which was a difficult one because both the British and the French had been residing in the city and providing the defenses. As the British learnt that the French had strong supports to Pegu, just before the Seven Years' War, they decided to declare support for Alaungpaya to counter the French. Alaungpaya, however, was suspicious and angry at the British when he learned that a British warship Arcot fought for the Mons at Syriam. In late 1755, contemplating northern attacks from either Manipur or the Shans in his rear, Alaungpaya left his besieging forces at Syriam with himself personally went north to Ava and sent Burmese forces to attack Manipur. The Burmese attacked and plundered Manipur in 1755, leaving so much damages that the event was called 'First Devastation' (Koolthakahalba) in Manipuri history.

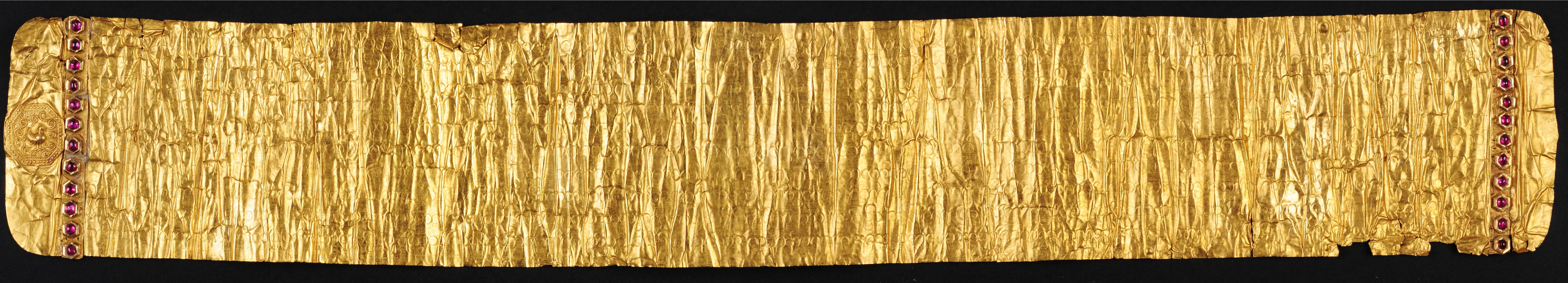
Golden Letter of King Alaungpaya, sent to King George II of Great Britain in 1756, now at Gottfried Wilhelm Leibniz Library in Hanover, became a UNESCO Memory of the World Register in 2015.

Alaungpaya personally returned to Syriam front in early 1756. The siege of Syriam took eleven months. Sieur de Bruno asked for additional French forces from Pondicherry to Syriam. Arrival of French reinforcements would strengthen Syriam defenders. In July 1756, Alaungpaya created the Golden Company of Syriam, consisting of 93 Burmese fighters who would sacrifice their lives to French gunshots as vanguard in order to pave way for Alaungpaya to take Syriam. Alaungpaya finally conquered Syriam on 25 July 1756. Two French reinforcement ships arrived only three days late. Alaungpaya tortured Sieur de Bruno and forced the French headman to write a letter to lure the arriving French ships to enter Syriam. Unaware that Syriam had fallen, the two French ships arrived, only to be seized by the Burmese. The Burmese seized a great number of French firearms from the ships, including cannons, field guns and muskets – a great haul to Alaungpaya's armory. Sieur de Bruno was executed by fire roasting. Alaungpaya's conquest of Syriam virtually ended French support to Pegu and left the Mons isolated.

Alaungpaya attacked the Mon capital of Pegu in October 1756. Cornered and desperate, the Hanthawaddy court only sued for peace. Binnya Dala the King of Pegu agreed to send his daughter, whom Talaban had romantic interest on, to become a consort of Alaungpaya. Binnya Dala's younger brother Upayaza led the Hanthawaddy princess to visit Alaungpaya at his camps, where Alaungpaya held Upayaza hostage. The Mons were initially satisfied with this arrangement except for Talaban, who did not acknowledge this decision. Talaban rode off to fight the Burmese, breaking through the Burmese siege and going to Sittaung, eventually to Chiang Mai. With the Peguans lured into believing that the truce was genuine, Alaungpaya again resumed attacks on Pegu. The Peguans, then deprived of most of their commanders who had surrendered to Alaungpaya, defended their city in last resort. Alaungpaya eventually conquered Pegu city on 6 May 1757, ending the seventeen-year-old Hanthawaddy Kingdom of the Mons. The royal city of Pegu or Hanthawaddy was utterly destroyed on this occasion. Alaungpaya took Binnya Dala the last King of Pegu, his brother Upayaza, captured Mon people to Rangoon, which became new administrative center of Lower Burma replacing Pegu. Alaungpaya 'commanded' the British to visit him. Thomas Lester, a British delegate from Negrais, went to visit the Burmese king at Myanaung in 1757. Lester was made to crawl on his knees to approach Alaungpaya. Anglo–Burmese Treaty of 1757 was concluded, granting British permission to settle at Negrais and Bassein in exchange for annual British supply of gunpowder to Alaungpaya. Alaungpaya then took Hanthawaddy royals back to his capital at Shwebo.

Upon Alaungpaya's victory over the Mons of Hanthawaddy in 1757, Lanna-Mon petty rulers of Chiang Saen, Kengtung, Phrae, Nan and Martaban sent congratulatory tributes to Alaungpaya at Pegu. However, Chiang Mai and Tavoy remained defiant, not sending tributes, as these cities had to be taken by force not though peaceful submission. Alaungpaya still had to declare his intention to conquer Chiang Mai and Tavoy in September 1759 because Chiang Mai and Tavoy were not yet under his control.

=== Internal Conflicts of Ayutthaya ===
Reign of King Borommakot was remembered as a 'golden age' of Ayutthaya. His demise foreshadowed the end of Ayutthaya kingdom itself. When Alaungpaya was consolidating his power in Upper Burma, Borommakot sent a religious mission to restore Theravada Buddhism in Sri Lankan Kingdom of Kandy in 1752–1753. Borommakot had three sons born to his principal queens – Thammathibet, Ekkathat and Uthumphon, they held the superior rank of Kromma Khun. Borommakot made Thammathibet Wangna or Front Palace Prince and heir presumptive in 1741. Chaophraya Chamnan Borirak died in 1753, leaving political vacuum in which competing princes rushed to fill in. Prince Thammathibet initially emerged powerful as he was the royal heir. However, Thammathibet faced opposition from Chao Sam Krom or the Three Princes, who were sons of Borommakot born to secondary consorts. They were Prince Chitsunthorn, Prince Sunthornthep and Prince Sepphakdi. These three princes were ranked inferiorly as Kromma Muen. In 1755, Borommakot appointed new ministers Chaophraya Aphairacha as Samuha Nayok or Prime Minister and Chaophraya Kalahom Khlongklaeb as Minister of Military.

The Three Princes appointed some of their servants to the rank of Khun, surpassing the limit of their own princely ranks as they could only promote their servants to the rank of Muen. Prince Thammathibet took this violation of princely ranks seriously and took matters into his own hands by arresting those servants of the Three Princes to be punished. In April 1756, Thammathibet sent his forces to arrest Prince Sunthornthep, one of the Three Princes. Prince Sunthornthep escaped and told their father King Borommakot about the incidents. Borommakot summoned Thammathibet for explanation but Thammathibet visited his father with an army and a sword in his hand. Angered, Borommakot imprisoned his son and heir Thammathibet. Sunthornthep told Borommakot that Thammathibet had been in an adulterous relationship with Princess Sangwan, a princess consort of Borommakot. Thammathibet confessed that he had secretly made keys for the inner palace and royal bedchambers in order to engage in relationships with the king's consorts and even to possibly commit treason. Prince Thammathibet was whipped with rattan cane strokes one hundred and eighty times, succumbed to his wounds and died in April 1756.

After the death of Prince Thammathibet, the office of Front Palace became vacant. In March 1757, Prince Kromma Muen Thepphiphit, another son of Borommakot, in concert with other ministers of Chatusadom including the Prime Minister Aphairacha, Kalahom the Minister of Military and Phrakhlang the trade minister, proposed to make Uthumphon the new Wangna. Uthumphon initially refused, saying that he had an elder brother, Ekkathat. However, Borommakot intentionally passed over Ekkathat, citing that Ekkathat was incompetent and sure to bring disaster to kingdom. Uthumphon reluctantly accepted the position and was made Wangna Prince of the Front Palace in 1757. Borommakot also exiled Ekkathat to become a monk at Wat Lamut temple to the northeast of Ayutthaya to keep him from powers.

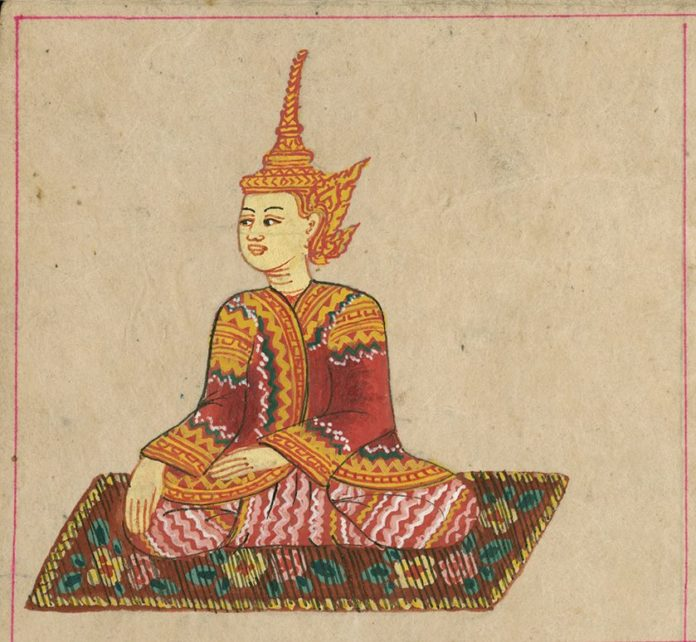
Burmese Parabaik manuscript depicting either of Siamese kings Ekkathat or Uthumphon.

Borommakot died in April 1758. Uthumphon faced opposition from the Three Princes, who laid their competing claims to kingship. Ekkathat, who had been Buddhist monk at Wat Lamut temple, returned to Ayutthaya to support Uthumphon. The Three Princes sent their forces to break into the royal armory to seize a large number of guns. With civil war looming, five Buddhist prelates beseeched the Three Princes to cease their belligerent actions. The Three Princes complied with the virtuous monks, went to visit and paid obeisance to the new king Uthumphon. However, Ekkathat secretly ordered policemen to arrest the Three Princes to be executed. Uthumphon took the throne in May 1758 but Ekkathat stayed at Suriyat Amarin Palace, not returning to Wat Lamut temple despite being a Buddhist monk to impose pressure on his brother Uthumphon. Uthumphon finally gave in, after merely a month on the throne, by abdicating in favor of his elder brother in June. Uthumphon went to become a monk at Wat Pradu temple, earning him epithet Khun Luang Hawat or the King Who Sought Temple. Ekkathat then ascended the throne as the last king of Ayutthaya in June 1758. Ekkathat brought two ministers Phraya Ratchamontri Pin and Chamuen Si Sorarak Chim, brothers of Ekkathat's favorite consort, to government. Phraya Ratchamontri and Chamuen Si Sorarak wielded immense powers in Siamese royal court, even surpassing those ministers of Chatusadom.

Officials and ministers of royal court were upset and offended by the rule of brothers of Ekkathat's consort. In December 1758, dissatisfying ministers, including Chaophraya Aphairacha the Prime Minister and Phraya Yommaraj the Head of Police Bureau, conspired to overthrow Ekkathat in favor of Uthumphon the temple king, whom they considered more capable of being king. The conspiring ministers approached Prince Thepphiphit, who agreed to take lead. Prince Thepphiphit and the conspirators visited Uthumphon at his temple, informing Uthumphon about the plans. Uthumphon, however, preferred religious life and did not trust the conspirators so Uthumphon went to tell Ekkathat about this seditious plot in exchange for Ekkathat not killing the conspirators. Aphairacha, Yommaraj and other conspirators were arrested, not killed but imprisoned. Prince Thepphiphit fled to the west but was caught. Ekkathat then boarded his half-brother Thepphiphit on a Dutch ship to be deported to Sri Lanka in 1758 for his rebellion attempt. Ekkathat also threatened to execute Phraya Phrakhlang for his unproved implication in the plot. The panicked trade minister gave a large sum of money to the king. Ekkathat then spared Phrakhlang and appointed him Chaophraya Phrakhlang the new Samuha Nayok or Prime Minister, replacing Aphairacha. By 1759, pro-Uthumphon supporters had been purged and expelled from royal court as Ekkathat's allies rose to power.

=== Tenasserim to 1757 ===
Dawei Yazawin or Tavoy chronicles describes the legendary foundation of Tavoy. Buddha himself visited the Tavoy area in 'legendary' times and the local Nat spirit Durakha gave Buddha a durian fruit. Buddha then gave a prophecy about a prosperous city in the area. Later then the deity Indra sent a female Nat spirit to sire a boy with the hermit Gawinanda. The boy grew up and became King Thamandaraza the first king of Thagara – the ancient town of Tavoy. Thagara, allegedly founded in 754 CE, was to the north of modern Dawei on the west bank of Tavoy River. Mon chronicles state that a certain Burmese King of Pagan Kingdom ventured down south to visit the Tavoy area, where he found abundant durian trees. The Burmese king the founded Tavoy as an entrepot to gather and send durians to the Pagan. Francis Mason, an American missionary who began his works at Tavoy, then under British rule, in 1831, recorded the legendary foundation of Tavoy as follows; In 1204, King Narapatisithu of Pagan traveled south and founded Tavoy. Mason also explained that this was the reason why the Tavoyans spoke a Burmese-related language.

Tavoy then came under the rule of Mon Hanthawaddy Kingdom of Lower Burma. The ruler of Tavoy submitted to King Wareru of the Mons. Tavoy city moved to Weidi in 1390 to the south of modern Dawei on the western bank. Another Tavoyan city called Mokti was founded on the eastern bank. In 1488, King Borommaracha III of Ayutthaya conquered Tavoy for the first time. Tavoy then came under Siamese rule, while Tanintharyi or Tenasserim had been a city under Ayutthaya governance since at least mid-fifteenth century, attested with Tenasserim Inscriptions, in which King Trailoknanat of Ayutthaya appointed governor of Tenasserim in 1462 using Khmer language. Tenasserim appeared in a list of Siamese cities composed in 1455, later then incorporated into the Three Seals Law. In 1531, according to Myeik Yazawin or Mergui chronicles, the ruler of Tenasserim founded the new port-town of Marit or Mergui to replace the former port covered with silts. Mergui then emerged as an important trading port on the Tenasserim Coast on Andaman Sea under jurisdiction of Tenasserim.

Throughout history, both Burma and Siam had claimed the entire Tenasserim coast (present-day Mon State and Tanintharyi Region in Myanmar) and control had changed hands several times. The Burmese Pagan Dynasty controlled the entire coast until 1287. Throughout 14th and 16th centuries, Siamese kingdoms (first Sukhothai, later Ayutthaya) controlled much of the coast, up to just south of present-day Mawlamyaing. In the mid-16th century, the Burmese under Toungoo kings Tabinshwehti and Bayinnaung tried to regain the coast, first failing in 1548, and finally succeeding in 1564 when they conquered all of Siam for the first time. The Siamese revolted in 1584, and under their king Naresuan regained the lower coast by 1593 and the entire coast by 1594. The Burmese retook the upper coast down to Tavoy in 1615, but failed to recover the rest.

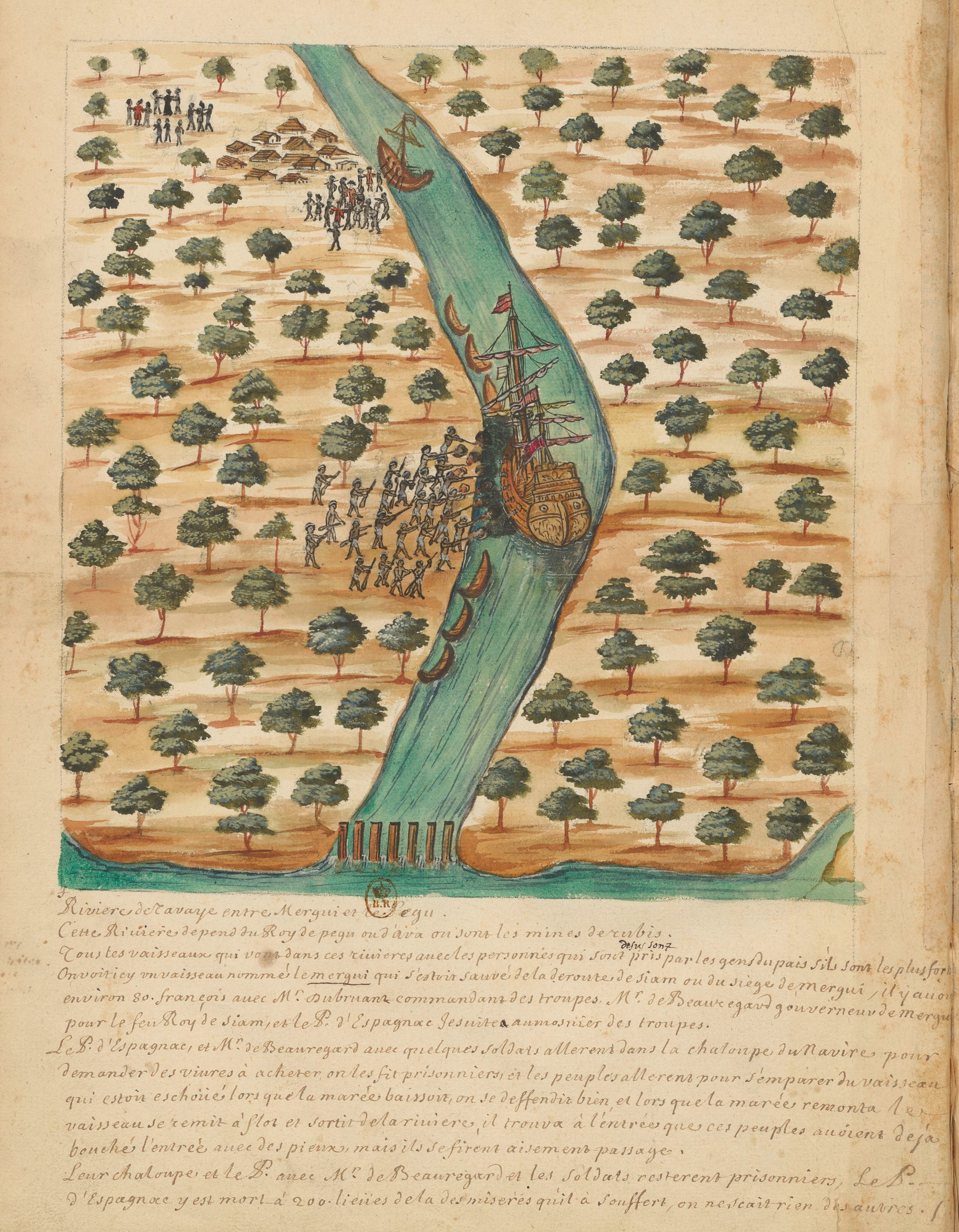
Drawing by a Jesuit priest from 1690, depicting French commander Brigadier du Bruant being attacked by Tavoyan forces in Tavoy River. Du Bruant was among many French officials who had escaped from Siamese onslaught at Mergui in 1688.

During this period, Mergui on the Andaman Sea was the primary port of Siam through which its trade with India and the West was conducted. In 1683, King Narai of Siam, at suggestion of his First Minister Constantine Phaulkon, appointed a former British East India Company employee Richard Burnaby to be the governor of Mergui. Burnaby and his harbormaster Samuel White went out of Siamese control in their attempts to establish their own personal dominance over the trades of the Bay of Bengal by building a large fleet and attacking rival merchant ships in 1685. These actions enraged the English East India Company stationed at Madras, leading to the Anglo-Siamese War. East India Company considered its former employees Richard Burnaby and Samuel White to be the troublemakers. The Company then sent some ships to impose naval blockade on Mergui in 1687 and to arrest the two Englishmen. Siamese armies, under the Siamese governor of Tenasserim, responded by attacking, resuming control of Mergui and massacring most of the English residents and arrivals there, including Burnaby. King Narai then made a French militaryman Chevalier de Beauregard the Okphra or governor of Mergui. In 1688, King Narai allowed the French to station their troops in Mergui. However, the Siamese Revolution happened shortly after. Siamese armies expelled the French from Mergui. De Beauregard fled on ships and sailed into the Tavoy River to seek refuge at Tavoy, which had been under Burmese rule. Unfortunately, De Beauregard and other French men were attacked and arrested by Tavoyan authorities. De Beauregard was condemned to slavery by Burmese authorities, deported to Pegu and died shortly after in slavery.

The control of Tenasserim coast in the early 18th century was divided between Burma and Siam, with the Burmese controlling down to Tavoy (Dawei) and the Siamese controlling the rest. This arrangement lasted until 1740 (although the Siamese unsuccessfully tried to take the upper coast in 1662–65). According to Thai version of Mon chronicles, in 1740, the Burmese governor of Martaban named Nara Kyawthu, in regard to restoration of Mon Hanthawaddy Kingdom, was fearful that the Mon inhabitants of his city would also rise up so he decided to abandon his city and fled to take refuge at Tavoy. The newly-established Hanthawaddy court then ordered Nara Kyawthu the governor of Martaban to submit. Nara Kyawthu, fearing the Mons, decided to gather his family and sought shelter in Siamese-held Tenasserim along with the governor of Tavoy. Phraya Tanaosi the Siamese governor of Tenasserim sent these two Burmese governors along with their families to Ayutthaya in 1742. King Borommakot also commanded Phraya Tanaosi to march Siamese forces to occupy Tavoy. Tavoy then came under Siamese rule temporarily. King Borommakot sent Siamese emissaries to escort the two Burmese governors of Martaban and Tavoy back to Ava in 1745. Siam probably left Tavoy soon after as the Burmese king appointed a new governor of Tavoy named Minnalhla.

When Ava fell to Mon conquerors in 1752, Minnalhla the governor of Tavoy was left isolated, cut off by the Mon Hanthawaddy Kingdom in Lower Burma. Martaban and Tavoy became independent, not even coming under the rule of Hanthawaddy. In 1754, according to Dawei Yazawin, Minnalhla founded the modern town of Dawei, moved to its present location and sent a letter to the British asking for support. With Alaungpaya's conquest of Pegu in 1757, Alaungpaya acquired Martaban. In the Anglo–Burmese Treaty of 1757, it was stated that the British should not help the "King of Tavoy" against Alaungpaya, meaning that, by 1757 and after, Tavoy was still independent and a formidable rival to Alaungpaya himself.

=== Mon Rebellion of 1758 ===
After Alaungpaya had taken Rangoon in mid-1755, he proceeded to attack and lay siege on Syriam where both the British and the French had been residing. British ships in Syriam showed allegiance to Alaungpaya by leaving Syriam to join Alaungpaya at Rangoon. Robert Jackson, captain of the British ship Arcot, was reluctant to take Alaungpaya's side along with his fellow British men. Jackson did not personally visit Alaungpaya but rather sent his delegate John Whitehill on a mission to visit Alaungpaya. Alaungpaya commanded the British to hand over their muskets and weapons to him. Captain Jackson of Arcot ship refused to comply. Then Alaungpaya had to personally leave Rangoon for his northern campaigns in late 1755. The French and the Mons at Syriam took this opportunity to sail their fleet to attack the Burmese at Rangoon. Captain Jackson decided to join the French–Mon side with his ship Arcot to attack the Burmese. When Alaungpaya returned to Rangoon in early 1756, Alaungpaya was furious at defection of British ship Arcot and put his grievances on Whitehill, whom he had met in person.

Gharib Niwaz the great king of Manipur abdicated in favor of his son Chitsai in 1749 but was exiled by his own son the new king and ended up seeking shelter in Burmese capital of Ava. When Ava fell to the Mons in 1752, Gharib Niwaz attempted to return to Manipur but King Chitsai, who feared that his father Gharib Niwaz might put his son and preferred heir Shyam Shai on the throne, sent his agents to assassinate Gharib Niwaz and Shyam Shai on their way. Death of Gharib Niwaz marked the downturn of Manipur, which would be plunged into dynastic conflicts. In 1752, Chitsai was overthrown by Bharatsai, another son of Gharib Niwaz. Next year, in 1753, Bharatsai was overthrown and Gaurisiam, son of Shyam Shai and grandson of Gharib Niwaz, was made new King of Manipur. After his victorious conquest of Hanthawaddy in 1757, Alaungpaya embarked on another grand campaign to conquer Manipur in late 1758, declaring to avenge for Gharib Niwaz's treacherous death and to convert Manipur to Theravada Buddhism. Alaungpaya himself led the Burmese forces to enter Manipur through the Aimol Pass, defeating Manipuri prince Bhagyachandra, brother of Gaurisiam, at Pallel. King Gaurisiam of Manipur, along with his Manipuri people, fled into the jungles to escape the invading Burmese. When Alaungpaya entered Imphal the Manipuri capital in November 1758, he found the city to be virtually abandoned and deserted.

In late 1758, the Mons in Lower Burma rose in rebellion, seizing control of Rangoon and Pegu. Nemyo Nawrahta, the Burmese governor of Pegu, was defeated and pushed back to Hinthada. Alaungpaya and Burmese conquerors occupied Imphal the Manipuri capital for nine days in November 1758 until when Alaungpaya heard of Mon insurrection in Lower Burma so Alaungpaya decided to abandon his Manipur campaign to return to Burma. Nemyo Nawrahta managed to retake Rangoon and disperse the Mon rebellion in 1759. A group of Mon rebels boarded on a French ship at Syriam and fled to take refuge at the Siamese port of Mergui. When Alaungpaya returned to Shwebo in February 1759, he learnt that the Mon rebellion had been pacified. At the advent of Seven Years' War, George Pigot the British governor of Madras decided to evacuate British forces from Negrais in order to be redeployed to fight the French in India. Most of the British forces left Negrais in April 1759, leaving only a small contingent to guard a British warehouse there.

In July 1759, King Alaungpaya of Burma marched his Burmese–Shan armies of 60,000 men from Shwebo down south in pilgrimage to make merits at Shwedagon Temple at Rangoon in Lower Burma. Meanwhile, John Whitehill arrived at Rangoon on his private trade venture. Unknowing that he had been subjected to the grudges of the Burmese king due to the defection of British ship Arcot four years ago, Whitehill traveled to Prome to visit Alaungpaya where Whitehill was arrested, physically beaten and chained. Whitehill had to pay a large sum of money to bail himself out of the wrath of Burmese king. Gregory the Armenian man and Lavine, a French man who had formerly been a subordinate of De Bruno, told Alaungpaya that the British at Negrais had supported the Mon rebels with weapons and ammunitions. Alaungpaya was then determined to extinguish the British from Burma. Alaungpaya made a Portuguese man Antonio the governor of Bassein and entrusted Antonio to lead a Burmese force to visit the British at Negrais. Antonio visited Negrais on 6 October 1759 where he was greeted by Southby the British headman in Negrais. Lavine invited Southby and other Europeans for a dinner. Antonio then shut the doors of dining room and commanded the Burmese soldiers to kill Southby and other Europeans. Ten Europeans and a hundred of Indian sepoys were massacred in this incident. The massacre of the British of Negrais at Burmese hands in October 1759 temporarily ended British presence in Burma and Anglo–Burmese relation was put to halt for four decades until the mission of Michael Symes in 1795.

== Causes of the War ==
=== Chakravartin ideology ===
Alaungpaya had declared himself Future Buddha or Bodhisattava, the savior who would end sufferings of the world and bring forth a new era of happiness. He was also to be the patron, upholder and restorer of Buddhism. During his prolonging siege of Syriam in 1756, Alaungpaya declared that he was assigned a sacred task from Sakra or Thagyamin (syncretization of the Indic deity Indra and the local Burmese Nat spirit, Thagyamin is the head of Nat pantheon) himself to end worldly strives and to create a peaceful world. Alaungpaya declared that the deity Indra had granted him a mighty lance called Arindama ("Tamer of Enemies") to be used against his enemies. In April 1756, Alaungpaya declared "Golden Message from Indra" (Thagya Shwe Pe Hlwa) to the Mons of Hanthawaddy, grandiosely telling that the deity Thagya had sent a message to the Mons that this new Burmese king possessed great merits and was, as prophesized by Buddha himself, destined to rule over China, India, the Shans, the Mons and Siam. The Mons should unconditionally comply to the verdict of the god Indra in order to avoid bloodsheds. This suggested that Alaungpaya embraced the Indic Chakravartin ("Spinner of the Wheel") ideology of Universal Conqueror – the concept that had also been revered by neighboring Theravadin polities including Siam. Chakravartin is the worldly alternative to Bodhisattava. Conquest of Ayutthaya might be a part of his long-term plan towards greatness.

=== Alaungpaya's pilgrimage to Rangoon ===
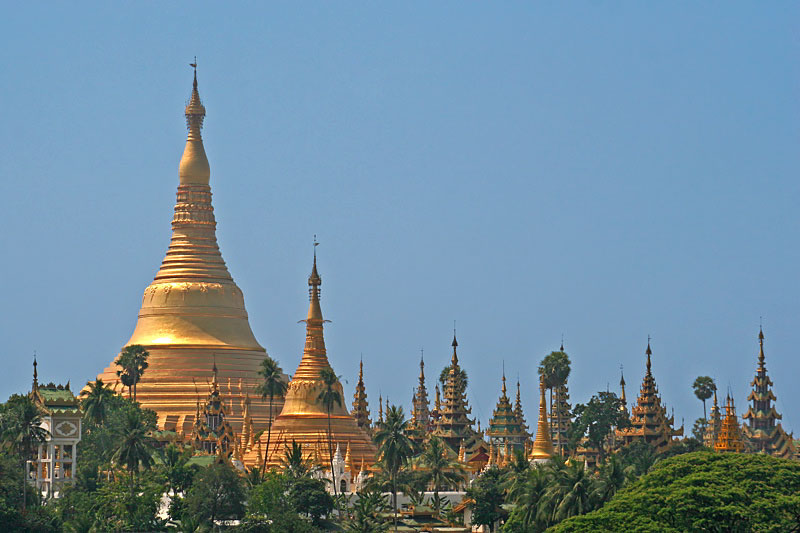
Shwedagon Pagoda in modern Yangon is the most sacred Buddhist religious site in Myanmar. King Alaungpaya took journey to make dedications at this place in 1759 before learning about Siamese provocations.

After his return to Shwebo from Manipur campaign in February 1759, Alaungpaya took off on his pilgrimage trip, along with his queen, his sons and his family, to Rangoon for dedication of Zayat or pavilion to the sacred Shwedagon Pagoda and for other merit-making activities. For some reasons, Alaungpaya amassed a huge army to go south with him to Rangoon. Alaungpaya might contemplate dangers from Mon rebels in Lower Burma, who had just been pacified or a grand military campaign, such as the conquest of Ayutthaya. Alaungpaya assigned his eldest son Prince Thiri Thudamayaza of Tabayin, who was also the Upayaza or Crown Prince, to take care of the royal capital Shwebo during his absence. Alaungpaya then organized Burmese forces to join his pilgrimage venture to Lower Burma;

- Prince Thiri Damayaza of Myedu, second son of Alaungpaya, future King Hsinbyushin, then twenty-three years old, would lead the vanguard force of 10,000 men.
- Alaungpaya himself would command the main portion of royal armies, composing of 24,000 men, with Minkhaung Nawrahta as his lieutenant.
- The rearguard force of 11,000 men included;
  - Prince Thado Minhla Kyaw of Amyint, son of Alaungpaya, sixteen years old, would command a rearguard force of 5,500 men
  - Prince Thado Minsaw of Badon, son of Alaungpaya, future King Bodawpaya, then fourteen years old, would command another rearguard force of 5,500 men.

With total number of 44,000 men, the Burmese forces assembled at Kyaukmyaung on the Irrawaddy River to the east of Shwebo. Alaungpaya also levied Shan forces from the Shan states of Htilin, Yaw, Teinnyin, Hsawnghsup, Kale, Mongyin, Mogaung, Bhamo, Mongmit, Thibaw, Yaunghwe Mongnai and Mobye. The Shan forces numbered to 25,000 men to march down through Toungoo to support Alaungpaya from another direction. These Burmese–Shan regiments took the total number of 69,000 men.

Alaungpaya left Shwebo along with his Queen Candadevi Yun San and his family to Kyaukmyaung, where the armies were assembled. The royal retinue left Kyaukmyaung on 19 July 1759 (10th waning of Waso, 1121 ME). Alaungpaya stayed at Rangoon and oversaw the construction of three Zayat pavilions and other ornamental structures dedicated to the Shwedagon Pagoda. The pagoda was also re-gilded. A religious ceremony of dedication was publicly performed. Queen Yun San went to worship the Shwemawdaw Pagoda of Pegu and the Kyaikkhauk Pagoda of Syriam was also worshipped by the royal family.

=== Siamese support to the Mons ===
Ever since Naresuan declared Siamese independence from Burmese domination in 1584, Siam had provided shelters to Mon refugees who escaped Burmese suppression and persecution from their homeland in Lower Burma. In late sixteenth century, waves of Mon immigrants entered Siam in 1584, 1595 and 1600. King Naresuan provided shelters for these Mon refugees to settle in the vicinity of Ayutthaya. Under Naresuan, Siam militarily supported and encouraged the Mons to insurrect against their overlord – Burma – to reduce Burmese powers and influence in the region. In the seventeenth century, when the Burmese court of Ava under the Toungoo dynasty conscripted the Mons to fight the invading Chinese armies in 1661, the Mons at Martaban rebelled against Burmese rule. King Narai of Ayutthaya sent Siamese armies to invade Tenasserim Coast up to Martaban, taking a large number of Mon people to settle in Samkhok (modern Pathum Thani), Pakkret and Nonthaburi to the south of Ayutthaya in Lower Chaophraya Basin. Even though the Siamese and the Mons differed in their languages, they were united by their common belief in Theravada Buddhism and the prevailing inter-marriage. The Mons were quickly assimilated into mainstream Siamese society and lost their ethnic identity over the course of time.

In the eighteenth century, the first wave of Mon immigrants arrived in Siam in 1746 when Smim Htaw the King of Hanthawaddy was overthrown. Smim Htaw and his loyal followers led by Binnya Ran arrived in Ayutthaya, where King Borommakot granted the Phosamton area to the north of Ayutthaya for Binnya Ran and his Mon followers to reside. Borommakot sent Siamese diplomatic envoys to visit the Burmese court of Ava in 1744–1745 to repatriate some Burmese officials and possibly to observe political situation in Burma. After departure of Smim Htaw from Siam in 1748, the Siamese court of Ayutthaya had been largely ignorant and uninterested in the events in Burma. When the new Burmese king Alaungpaya conquered Pegu in 1757, Ayutthaya did not seem to be bothered by this development. In late 1758, the Mons of Lower Burma rebelled but were quickly quelled. Some French and Mon people took a French ship from Rangoon or Syriam and headed towards Pondicherry to seek refuge but the strong winds blown the ship off course to the Siamese port of Mergui. This French ship, however, was arrested and seized by Siamese authorities in Mergui due to violation of some trade agreements. Ekkathat the King of Siam insisted on keeping this ship hostage, in spite of pleas from his ministers who feared that holding this ship would invoke the wrath of the Burmese king.

When Alaungpaya embarked on his pilgrimage journey down south to Rangoon in July 1759, he learnt about the French and the Mons who had fled to Mergui. Alaungpaya made his claims to the ship as his royal ship and sent his delegates to make demands on the Siamese port of Mergui, urging Siam to repatriate the ship along with its crew. Siamese Mergui officials, however, replied that they cannot return the said ship to Burma without authorization from the Siamese king. Ekkathat stood his grounds, insisting on keeping the ship. Later, on 20 September 1759 (15th waning of Tawthalin 1121 ME), Alaungpaya learnt that his royal cargo trading ships were seized by the Siamese in Tavoy and the Siamese had intruded into the territories of Tavoy, which was considered belonging to Burma but, in fact, Tavoy had been still an independent city-state. These Siamese provocations were perceived by Alaungpaya as Siam being in support to the Mon rebels, even though Siam, in the eighteenth century, had never supplied any military forces or weapons to the Mons, just providing shelters to the incoming Mon refugees. Siam was more concerned about its own internal conflict as a rebellion had just been pacified in late 1758, leaving no room to pay attention to external geopolitical dilemma. Alaungpaya had already amassed his huge armies of nearly 70,000 men on his religious trip to Rangoon in mid-1759, apparently for some grand military expeditions. Incensed by Siamese insult to his dignity, King Alaungpaya was opted to initiate a grand campaign to punish Siam. Burmese–Siamese dispute over the French ship at Mergui might serve as a mere casus belli for Alaungpaya to conduct his grand campaign to conquer Siam to further his glories. Ayutthaya, by 1759, was unaware of how strong the new Burmese regime had become.

=== Casus belli ===
Alaungpaya was concerned by the continuing flow of Mon rebels to the Siamese controlled territories, believing that the Mons would always be plotting to rebel and win back Lower Burma(his concern proved justified. The Mons put up several rebellions in 1758, 1762, 1774, 1783, 1792, and 1824–1826. Each failed rebellion was followed by more Mon flight to Siam). Alaungpaya demanded that the Siamese stop their support of the Mon rebels, surrender their leaders, and cease intrusions into the upper coast, which he considered Burmese territory. The Siamese king Ekkathat refused Burmese demands, instead prepared for war.

While historians generally agree that the Siamese support of the Mon rebels and their cross border raids were some of the causes of war, they do not agree on (other) ulterior motives. Some British colonial era historians of Burmese history (Arthur Phayre, G.E. Harvey) outright downplay the aforementioned reasons as "pretexts", and have suggested that the primary cause of the war was Alaungpaya's desire to restore Bayinnaung's empire (which included Siam). David Wyatt, a historian of Thai history, acknowledges that Alaungpaya could have feared "Ayutthaya's backing for the revival of the Kingdom of Pegu" but adds that Alaungpaya, "apparently a rather crude country fellow with scant experience of statecraft was simply continuing to do what he early demonstrated he could do best: lead armies to warfare".

But Burmese historian Htin Aung strongly counters that their analyses greatly understate Alaungpaya's genuine concern for his still nascent and unstable rule in Lower Burma, and that Alaungpaya never invaded Arakan as the Arakanese never showed him any hostility, although Sandoway in southern Arakan had sent him tribute in 1755. Historian Thant Myint-U also points out the Siamese longstanding policy of keeping "a buffer against their aged-old enemies the Burmese" has extended down to the modern era where families of insurgent Burmese leaders are allowed to live in Thailand, and insurgent armies are free to buy arms, ammunition, and other supplies.

Later Western historians provide a somewhat more balanced view. D.G.E. Hall writes that the "chronic raiding" by the Siamese and Mon rebels "alone would have provided an adequate casus belli" although he adds "for a monarch unable to settle down to a peaceable existence". David I. Steinberg, et al., concur that the casus belli grew out of a local rebellion in Tavoy in which the Siamese were thought to be involved. More recently, Helen James states that Alaungpaya likely wanted to capture Siam's trans-peninsula trade, while granting that his "subsidiary motivation" was to stop Siamese attacks and Siamese support for the Mons.

== Burmese preparation ==
When King Alaungpaya of Burma decided to conduct his grand campaign to conquer Ayutthaya in late 1759, he was dissuaded by his court astrologers who pointed out that, according to their horoscopic calculations, this campaign would be inauspicious and illnesses might take over the king. Alaungpaya apparently did not listen to these soothsayers and went on to assemble his armies for the invasion of Siam. Alaungpaya commanded his two sons; Prince Amyint and Prince Badon, who had been in charge of the rearguard forces, to march back to accompany the queen and the rest of Burmese royal family to return to Shwebo, while Alaungpaya himself and his second son the Myedu Prince (later King Hsinbyushin) would go on to invade Siam. The Burmese then began to assemble their invasion force, starting during their new year celebrations in April 1759, gathering troops from all over Upper Burma, including from recently conquered northern Shan States and Manipur. By late 1759, Alaungpaya had massed a force of 40 regiments (40,000 men including 3,000 cavalry) at Yangon. Of the 3,000 cavalry, 2,000 were Manipuri "Cassay Horse", who had just been press-ganged into Alaungpaya's service after the Burmese conquest of Manipur in 1758.

Alaungpaya was to lead the invasion personally, and his second son Hsinbyushin was his second-in-command. His first son Naungdawgyi was left to administer the country. Also in his service were his top generals including the likes of Minkhaung Nawrahta who like all Burmese leadership had plenty of military experience. Some in the court urged him to stay behind and allow Hsinbyushin to lead the operation but the king refused.

In September 1759, King Alaungpaya at Rangoon initiated his plans for the conquests of Ayutthaya, Chiang Mai and Lamphun. He assigned the vanguard forces;

- under Minhla Yaza, who commanded a vanguard force of 1,000 men and would left Rangoon first for Martaban in November 1759.
- under Sithu Nawrahta and Thohanbwa the Shan saopha of Yaw, who commanded a vanguard force of 1,000 men, would follow Minhla Raya to leave Rangoon for Martaban.
- Alaungpaya himself would march his main royal armies to leave Rangoon for Martaban in early December 1759.

During Alaungpaya's stay at Rangoon for his preparation of Burmese armies to invade Siam, he sent a Portuguese man named Antonio under his service to bring Burmese forces to massacre the British at Negrais in October 1759. In December, Alaungpaya sent commands to Daw Zweyaset the Mon governor of Martaban to assemble the Mon forces and to gather food resources for the upcoming invasion of Ayutthaya. The Burmese assembled a fleet of 300 ships to transport a portion of their troops directly to the Tenasserim coast. As Alaungpaya had ended his relations with the British in the aftermath of the Negrais incident, he saw the French as the new source of European firearms. In December 1759, Alaungpaya dispatched a royal letter to Thomas Arthur, comte de Lally the governor of Pondicherry, urging the French to resume trade relations with Burma. However, both Lally and Pondicherry itself were in an intense warfare with the British so they did not respond to the Burmese king's request.

== Burmese conquest of Tenasserim Coast ==
=== Burmese conquest of Tavoy ===
Alaungpaya was late on his schedule to conquer Ayutthaya. On 21 December 1759 (3rd waxing of Pyatho 1121 ME), Alaungpaya, along with his second son Prince Myedu (future King Hsinbyushin), left Rangoon with his invasion army, numbering 46,000 infantrymen and 3,500 cavalry (Thai sources gave the number of 30,000.) for Martaban. Alaungpaya sailed his riverine fleet from Rangoon to Hanthawaddy or Pegu the former Mon royal capital through the Bago River. The royal riverine retinue then disembarked at Pegu, going on foot to Martaban, crossing the Sittaung River at Sittaung. At Martaban, a suspicion was raised about Daw Zweyaset, a Mon official whom Alaungpaya had appointed as the governor of Martaban when Alaungpaya took over that city previously in 1757, being in seditious cooperation with Talaban – the former military general of Pegu who had escaped the Burmese conquest. Talaban, after his breaking through of the Burmese siege of Pegu in 1757, went to seek shelter at Lanna Chiang Mai. Talaban later then returned to make his stand at Kawgun (in modern Hpa-An, Kayin State) upstream from Martaban along the Salween River. Alaungpaya found Daw Zweyaset to be guilty of his allegations and had him executed. Alaungpaya appointed another Mon official named Daw Talut to be the new governor of Martaban.

The Burmese armies gathered in Martaban in December 1759. At Martaban, instead of taking the usual route via the Three Pagodas Pass, Alaungpaya invaded south because he had to subjugate the independent Tavoy first. Alaungpaya made claims that Tavoy had rebelled against him. He sent his son Hsinbyushin to lead the vanguard of six regiments (5,000 men, 500 horses) to Tavoy. Minhla Yaza, Sithu Nawrahta and Thohanbwa of Yaw led the vanguard force of 2,000 to successfully take Tavoy. After being an independent city-state for seven years from 1752, Tavoy easily fell to the Burmese in December 1759 or January 1760. The ruler of Tavoy, given his uncertain allegiance situating between the two powers, was executed. A number of Tavoyan people fled the Burmese conquest to Siamese towns of Mergui and Tenasserim. Alaungpaya was informed of Burmese victory over Tavoy on 4 January. The Burmese army paused for three days for the rest of army to arrive by land and by sea. Alaungpaya also declared Minhla Yaza to be the sole top commander of the vanguard.

=== Siamese preparation ===
On 15 January 1760, Alaungpaya dispatched two messengers to deliver his demands to the Siamese authorities at Tenasserim, demanding the Siamese king to return his sojourned French ship at Mergui and its crew and also to return the Tavoyan war refugees to him. The Siamese were unresponsive at best. Alaungpaya pressed his demands again on 19 January but to no avail. Running out of his patience, Alaungpaya finally decided to invade Siamese territories.

Siamese authorities in Tenasserim reported the development to the royal court of Ayutthaya, reporting that "A certain Burmese King named Manglong (possibly from Minlaung) has marched his army of about 30,000 men to successfully conquer Thawai (Tavoy) and now he is going to attack Marit (Mergui)." Ekkathat was panicked. Late Ayutthaya, unlike later early Bangkok, had not yet maintained an intelligence system manned by the Mons and the Karens on the borders. Siamese intelligence system was inaccurate. The Siamese king was falsely informed that the Burmese came in three directions; through the Singkhon Pass, the Three Pagodas Pass and from Chiang Mai. In fact, however, the Burmese only came through the Singkhon Pass. King Ekkathat of Ayutthaya then organized the "first phase" of Siamese defense against the Burmese offensives. He sent 8,000 men to the north, 10,000 men to the Three Pagodas and 14,000 men to Mergui. When it was later became clear that the Burmese only invade through Singkhon, Ekkathat focused his manpower allocation onto that front;

- Division of Phraya Yommaraj; As Phraya Yommaraj the Head of Police Bureau had been imprisoned for his rebellion attempt previously in 1758, Ekkathat appointed Phraya Inthrabodi to be the new Phraya Yommaraj. The new Phraya Yommaraj was assigned the command of a force of 3,000 men with Phraya Phetchaburi Rueang the governor of Phetchaburi as his vanguard commander.
- Division of Phraya Rattanathibet; Phraya Rattanathibet the Minister of Palace Affairs was assigned to command the force of 2,000 men with Phraya Siharaj Decho and Phraya Ratchawangsan, who was the commander of Krom Asa Cham or Malay mercenary regiment, as his vanguard commanders. Khun Rong Palat Chu, a minor official from Wiset Chaichan, also volunteered to fight the Burmese so he, along with his 400 Phrai commoner followers, was levied into this regiment.

=== Burmese capture of Mergui and Tenasserim ===
After the rest of the Burmese army had arrived, Alaungpaya's army; 5,000 men under the Myedu Prince and 3,000 men under Minkhaung Nawrahta, Alaungpaya's childhood friend, marched and besieged Mergui, with Alaungpaya's main armies closely following behind. Mergui resisted the Burmese for fifteen days. The vastly outnumbered Siamese garrison of 7,000 infantrymen and 300 cavalry was easily overran by the Burmese army. Minhla Yaza the Burmese vanguard commander took Mergui in early February 1760. Siamese town of Tenasserim, which held authorities over Mergui, was within two-day-march distance. These two Siamese towns offered little resistance. In less than two weeks of the war, the Burmese had captured both Mergui and the town of Tenasserim, and controlled the entire Tennaserim coast. Siamese officials from Mergui and Tenasserim simply fled to Inner Siam, going through the Singkhon Pass.

== Battle of Singkhon Pass ==
=== Alaungpaya's declaration of war ===
In February 1760, after winning over the entire Tenasserim coast, Alaungpaya made his mind to continue his offensive campaign in Siam. On 20 February 1760, Alaungpaya, who had been staying at Tavoy, declared his intention to invade Ayutthaya to the Siamese king Ekkathat;

To King of Dvaravati (Ayutthaya), the original reason of King Alaungmintaya's visit to Rangoon was to make merits on the Thein Gottaya Hill. A casual inspection at the port was made and the King was reported that one of the ships was stolen and taken to Mergui. Delegates were sent to bring the ship back but they could not because the officers at Mergui would not return the ship without specific permission from Siamese king. Meanwhile, there was a rebellion in Tavoy. It was suppressed and the leader of the rebellion was executed. Many people of Tavoy were frightened and fled to Mergui and Tenasserim. A demand was made for their repatriation. Officers there simply ignored this demand. The King's men went to Mergui and Tenasserim. The stolen ship was not found there. The King also followed them and is now approaching Dvaravati. Alaungmintaya expects to meet the Siamese king before reaching Dvaravati.

Perhaps learning about political conflicts in Ayutthaya, Alaungpaya enacted further ruses to Ekkathat;

Dvaravati king does not observe the ten kingly virtues. He has misconducted in his dealings, both with his relatives and his ministers. Alaungmintaya, who is a Bodhisattava with no equals in Jambudvīpa (India, in this context, Southeast Asia), has decided to teach Dvaravati king the way of being a virtuous king. He should come and sit at the foot of Lord Bodhisattava to learn his lessons.

=== Battle of Singkhon Pass ===
Ayutthayan armies arrived too late to rescue Mergui and Tenasserim so they took defensive positions;

- Phraya Yommaraj and his regiments took position at the Singkhon Pass, which was a narrow valley passageway cutting through the Tenasserim Hills – a major entry point for the incoming Burmese between modern Mawdaung and Theinkun.
- Phraya Rattanathibet and his regiments took position at Kuiburi.

Upon learning about Burmese invasion, Ekkathat ordered all of the city governors to bring their local forces to defend Ayutthaya. This overly-centralized defense strategy was characteristic of the reign of Ekkathat. Peripheral governors were obliged to abandon their cities to bring their forces to Ayutthaya, leaving their cities and towns defenseless to the mercy of Burmese invaders. Ekkathat also encouraged Siamese people in outlying towns to take refuge in the jungles in order to avoid being captured by the Burmese.

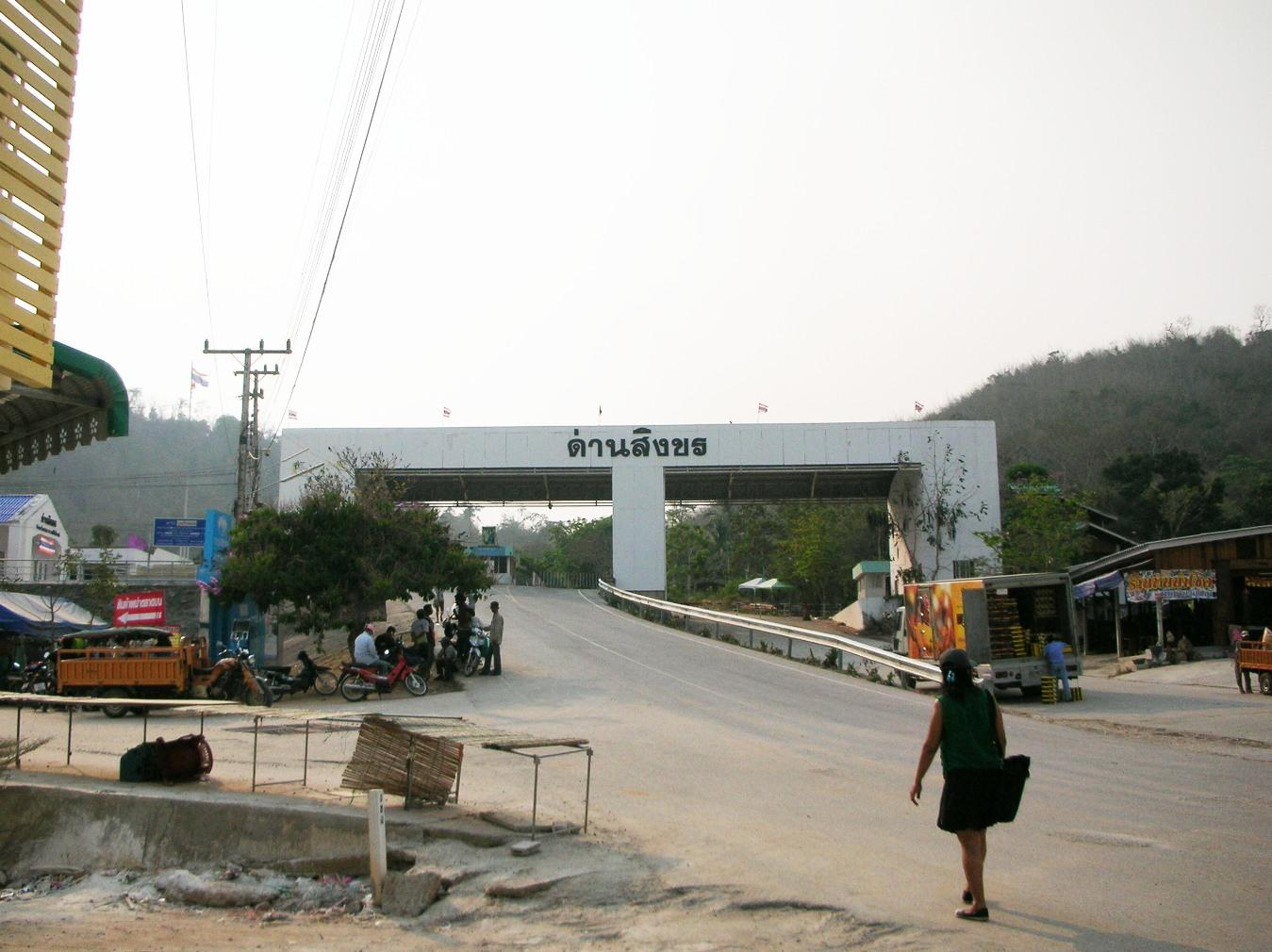
Modern Singkhon Pass checkpoint at Myanmar-Thailand border.

King Alaungpaya moved from Tavoy to Tenasserim. The Burmese began their offensives into the Singkhon Pass in early March 1760 and five days later they met the Siamese defending forces. Phraya Yommaraj sent his armies under Phraya Siharaj Decho (Bya Tezaw in Burmese) and Phraya Ratchawangsan (Aukbya Yazawunthan in Burmese) the vanguard commanders to face the Burmese, leading to the Battle of Singkhon Pass in early March 1760. This was the first confrontation between regular troops of Burma and Siam in about a century. Thai chronicles gave the number of 15,000 men for the Siamese army. Burmese chronicles, however, gave an astonishing number of 27,000 Siamese men.

The battle result was an absolute victory for the Burmese. Minkhaung Nawrahta, along with his subordinate commander Minhla Yaza, led his Burmese armies of 20,000 Burmese men (number given by Thai sources) to inflict heavy defeat on the Siamese defending armies of Phraya Yommaraj at the Singkhon Pass. The Siamese defeat obliged Phraya Yommaraj to retreat, allowing the Burmese to pass through the Singkhon Pass, entering the Gulf of Siam front.

== Gulf of Siam campaign ==
=== Battle of Wakhao ===
Statue of Khun Rong Palat Chu (ขุนรองปลัดชู), who was known for his stand against Burmese vanguard at Wakhao Bay in March 1760, in Wiset Chai Chan

After the victory of the Burmese under Minkhaung Nawrahta over the Siamese in the Battle of Singkhon Pass, the Burmese invading forces entered the Gulf of Siam front as the Siamese were retreating. Phraya Rattanathibet, who had been taking position at Kuiburi, sent his small vanguard regiment under Khun Rong Palat Chu to face the Burmese. Khun Rong Palat Chu led his army of 500 Phrai commoner men to wait for the Burmese at the Wakhao beach in modern Tambon ฺBonok, Mueang Prachuap Khiri Khan district. The Burmese invaders arrived at Wakhao in a morning in March 1760, leading to the Battle of Wakhao beach. According to Thai chronicles, Siamese men engaged in hand-to-hand combat with the Burmese. However, the Burmese were numerically superior and the Siamese were defeated by noon of that day. Khun Rong Palat Chu was captured alive by the Burmese, while his subordinates were chased by the Burmese into the sea, many of them were drowned and some managed to return to report to Rattanathibet at Kuiburi.

Phraya Rattanathibet, upon learning of this Siamese defeat, realized that Siamese stand against the invading Burmese was hopeless and decided to withdraw and retreat to Ayutthaya, ending the 'first phase' of Siamese defense. Both Phraya Rattanathibet and Phraya Yommaraj reported to King Ekkathat that the Burmese were too powerful to be dealt with at the periphery so the king adopted the defensive strategy by standing grounds at the royal citadel of Ayutthaya, waiting for the Burmese to come. Khun Rong Palat Chu became another Thai national hero in history known for his desperate stand against the Burmese at Wakhao beach in March 1760.

=== Burmese capture of Kuiburi and Phetchaburi ===
With the collapse of Siamese defense, Alaungpaya and his Burmese forces marched towards Ayutthaya virtually unopposed. The Burmese quickly took Kuiburi, Pranburi, Nongchik and Phetchaburi on the coast of Gulf of Siam in rapid succession. Alaungpaya assigned Minhla Yaza to be the leading commander of the vanguard but some other commanders were also enthusiastically pursued war glories, advancing far forward upon seeing the ineptitude of Siamese military. Impetuous advancement of Burmese vanguard would be a major problem. Alaungpaya had to issue many orders restraining the victory-pursuing vanguard officers who went too far in the frontlines, running the risk of being isolated without support from the main royal forces. When Alaungpaya was attacking Kuiburi, some of his vanguard forces had already reached Phetchaburi. Kuiburi fell to the Burmese on 16 March 1760. Alaungpaya ordered his forces to closely follow the retreating enemies in the distance within the range of lance-throwing.

Phetchaburi peacefully surrendered to Alaungpaya around 22 March. Three days later, on 25 March, Alaungpaya issued another message to Ekkathat the Siamese king;

Alaungmintaya, the Most Excellent King, Possessor of Arindama, Master of White Elephant, Defender of the Buddhist Religion, Liege Lord of Various Kings, Terror to Kings who have the audacity to refuse his suzerainty, Descendant of the Race of Sun, Lord of Sunaparanta, Tambadipa, Kampoca, Ramanna, Manipura, Sarekhettara and several others, made this intimation to King of Dvaravati, members of his family and all his subjects:

The ascendency of Alaungmintaya happens in accordance with the Buddha's prophesy.

Anyone who does not want to suffer the loss of his position, life and property shall submit himself to Alaungmintaya. Opposition to Alaungmintaya who is destined to become supreme is hopeless.

Alaungpaya's royal message was written in Thai and Burmese languages and placed in casket to be delivered by a young Siamese monk from Phetchaburi to King Ekkathat at Ayutthaya himself.

=== Burmese capture of Ratchaburi ===
Alaungpaya stayed at Phetchaburi for three days and then continued his campaign. Alaungpaya sent Minkhaung Nawrahta as his vanguard to attack Ratchaburi where he met a Siamese forces of 20,000 infantrymen, 1,000 cavalry and 200 elephants, under the command of Phraya Ratchawangsan the commander of Malay mercenary regiment. Initially, the Burmese under Minkhaung Nawrahta suffered heavy losses with many Burmese killed in battle. However, Prince Thiri Damayaza of Myedu, son of Alaungpaya (future king Hsinbyushin) brought the supporting forces to alleviate the situation for the Burmese at Ratchaburi. Reinforced, Minkhaung Nawrahta eventually prevailed over the Siamese under Phraya Ratchawangsan at Ratchaburi. Ratchawangsan himself rode on a horse to retreat from the battlefield. The Burmese captured 2,000 Siamese men, 1,000 guns and 180 small cannons from this battle.

The Burmese eventually captured Ratchaburi and quickly proceeded to seize Suphanburi, which was about fifty kilometers to the west of Ayutthaya itself.

== Battle of Talan ==
=== Ascendency of Uthumphon ===
When Alaungpaya and the Burmese armies had reached and occupied Suphanburi to the west of Ayutthaya, the Ayutthayan royal court and populace panicked. Within only a month of March 1760, Alaungpaya conducted rapid offensives into Western Siam from Tenasserim to Suphanburi. Burmese invaders had not come this far since 1586, about two centuries ago, when King Nanda Bayin of Toungoo dynasty also personally led his Burmese armies to invade Ayutthaya. Ayutthayan populace considered Ekkathat to be an incapable king so they beseeched his younger brother Uthumphon the temple king, who had abdicated to become a Buddhist monk at Wat Pradu temple previously in 1758, to leave monkhood to return to government in order to lead defenses against the Burmese. Uthumphon complied to the popular request, leaving monkhood and leaving his temple to return to the royal palace. Publicly, Uthumphon was to cooperate with Ekkathat in the commands but Uthumphon actually seized power in the royal court. Uthumphon pardoned and released his political supporters who had been imprisoned in late 1758 for their failed rebellion attempt to restore Uthumphon to the throne, including Chaophraya Aphairacha the former Samuha Nayok and the former Phraya Yommaraj.

Uthumphon organized the 'second phase' of Siamese defense. Uthumphon ordered all of Siamese people and food provisions to be collected and gathered inside of the Ayutthaya citadel, shutting all the city gates. He also ordered gunmen to be ready stationed on the walls and teak logs to obstruct all of Ayutthayan land and water gates to prevent Burmese entry. Uthumphon sent the Siamese forces of 20,000 men (30,000 men according to Burmese chronicles) led by Chaophraya Kalahom Khlongklaeb the Minister of Military, divided into five regiments, each under Chaophraya Kalahom himself (Aukbya Kalahon in Burmese), Phraya Rattanathibet, the former Phraya Yommaraj, Phraya Ratchawangsan and Phraya Siharaj Decho. Chaophraya Kalahom Khlongklaeb led his Siamese troops to station at the Talan River (modern Noi River in modern Phakhai district) to the northwest of Ayutthaya, speculating the Burmese offensives.

During these defensive preparations, Uthumphon flexed his political power by arresting Ekkathat's supporters including the unpopular brothers Phraya Ratchamontri Pin and Chamuen Si Sorrarak Chim. Both of the brothers were accused of having affairs with palace ladies – a classic Siamese political accusation and were subjected to fifty lashes of rattan cane flagellation. Phraya Ratchamontri succumbed to his wounds and soon died but his brother Si Sorrarak survived. In late March 1760, in response to the Burmese invasion, Ayutthaya experienced leadership turnover and political rearrangement, in which pro-Ekkathat supporters were purged and pro-Uthumphon officials were restored to power.

=== Battle of Talan ===
In Late March 1760, the Burmese vanguard, under the commands of Prince Thiri Damayaza of Myedu (son of Alaungpaya) and Minkhaung Nawrahta, left Suphanburi and marched towards Ayutthaya. The Burmese arrived at the banks of Talan River, about 25 kilometers to the northwest of Ayutthaya with the sights of Siamese defensive camps on the opposite side of the river, leading to the Battle of Talan. The Myedu Prince was poised to charge the Siamese right away but Minkhaung Nawrahta told the prince that the Siamese were numerically superior and they should wait for the main royal forces of Alaungpaya to arrive. Immediate charge on the Siamese without support from Alaungpaya posed the risk of failure. Alaungpaya himself issued command to the vanguard not to initiate any attacks until arrival of the main royal regiments.

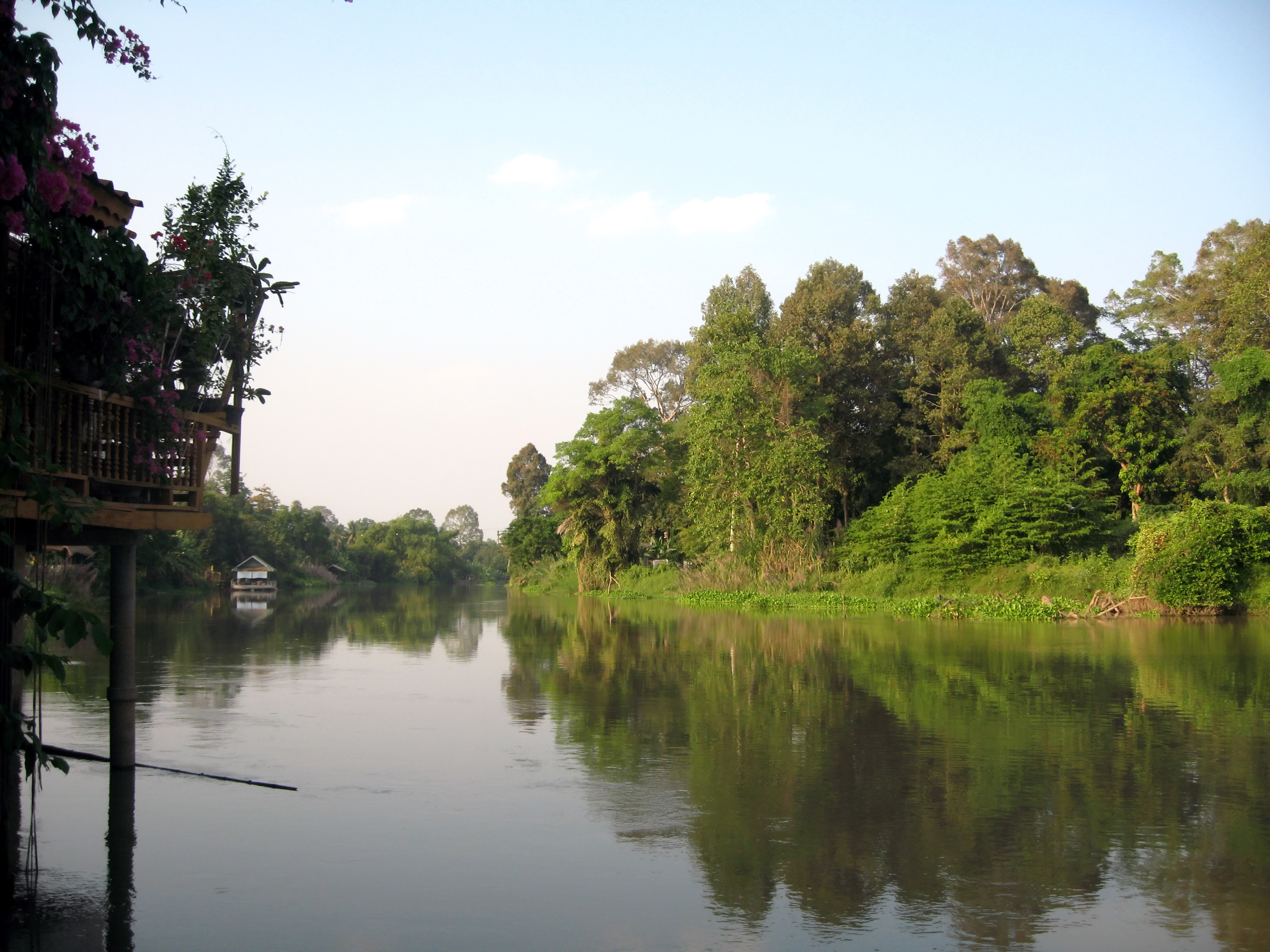
Modern Noi River to the northwest of Ayutthaya was the site of a Burmese–Siamese battle in March 1760 when Siamese gunmen fired onto the river-crossing Burmese.

Prince Myedu, however, was in his urgency in attacking the Siamese on the Talan River. As soon as Myedu heard distant sounds of drums and saw royal standards of Alaungpaya's main forces at a substantial distance, Prince Myedu ordered his vanguard forces to attack the Siamese right away without waiting for Alaungpaya. Prince Myedu divided his forces into three sections; right wing under command of Minkhaung Nawrahta, left wing under Minhla Nawrata and center under Minhla Thiri (who later became Maha Nawrahta). All three Burmese vanguard regiments crossed the Talan River to attack the Siamese on the opposite river bank. The Siamese, however, had the advantage of being on the dry land when the Burmese submerged in the water. Chaophraya Kalahom ordered Siamese gunmen to shell heavily onto the river-crossing Burmese, inflicting heavy damages and death toll upon them. The Burmese were on the verge of defeat but Alaungpaya and his main armies arrived just in time to save the situation. Alaungpaya helped pushed the Burmese vanguard to successfully cross the Talan River. Directly facing the Burmese on land, the Siamese were of no match. The Siamese were utterly defeated, dispersed and obliged to retreat.

Burmese chronicles state that the Burmese managed to capture all of five Siamese commanders, with exception for Chaophraya Kalahom whom they had to pursue. Chaophraya Kalahom Khlongklaeb the Siamese commander fled on the horseback but was closely pursued by the Burmese. The pursuing Burmese got to Chaophraya Kalahom near Wat Nonsi temple in modern Bang Pahan district to the northwest of Ayutthaya, where a Burmese lancer threw his lance at Chaophraya Kalahom. Kalahom, the Siamese Minister of Military, was pierced with the Burmese lance and killed immediately in action. Thai chronicles say that other commanders managed to return. It might be that the Siamese commanders were captured by the Burmese and then released. Former Phraya Yommaraj returned with many serious wounds from Burmese lances. Yommaraj recuperated at Ayutthaya and died a week later. For unknown reasons, during the confusion, Phraya Ratchawangsan attacked Phraya Rattanathibet and his regiment. Rattanathibet was convinced that his comrade Ratchawangsan was intended to harm him. Rattanathibet told Uthumphon that Phraya Ratchawangsan had been a traitor and co-conspirator with Phraya Ratchamontri, who had been executed. Phraya Ratchawangsan was then punished with fifty rattan cane blows, also succumbed to his wounds and died a week later.

== Siege of Ayutthaya ==
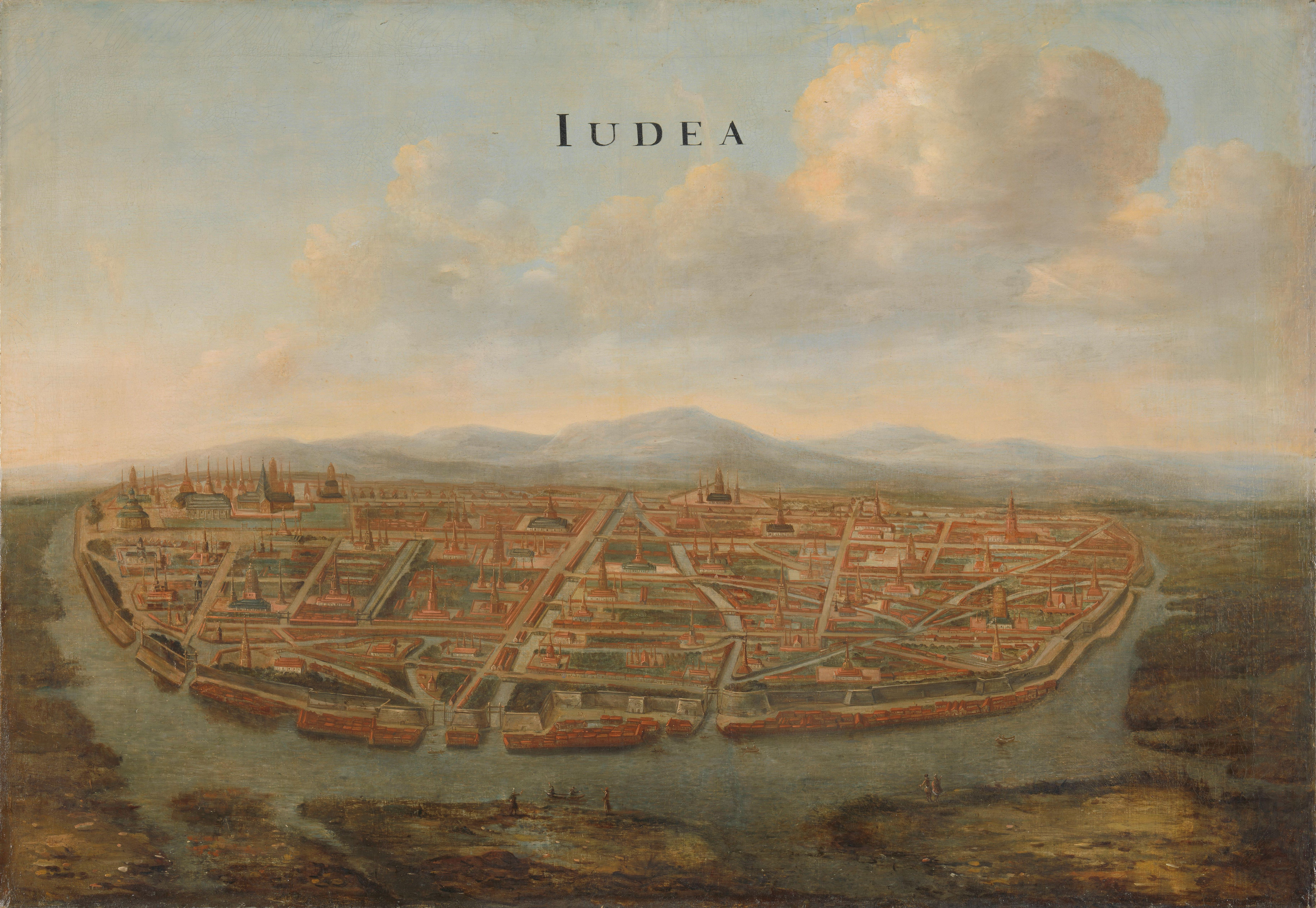
Siamese city of Ayutthaya, c. 1662-63

After the Burmese victory at the Battle of Talan in late March 1760, Alaungpaya proceeded to march his Burmese armies to encamp at Ban Kum, called Naung Outun or Ban Tun in Burmese, in Bangban district about ten kilometers to the northwest of Ayutthaya citadel, on 27 March 1760 (11th waxing of Tagu, 1122 ME). This was the first time since 1587, in the span of about two hundred years, that Burmese invaders managed to reach outskirts of Ayutthaya. In 1586, King Nanda Bayin of Toungoo dynasty led Burmese forces to invade Ayutthaya, arriving at Ayutthayan suburbs in 1587. Nanda Bayin stationed his forces in northern and eastern outskirts of Ayutthaya, imposing the siege and attacking Ayutthaya for four months but was eventually unsuccessful and retreated.

=== Battle of Phosamton ===
Alaungpaya sent his vanguard forces under Minkhaung Nawrahta to take position at Phosamton, a suburb to the north of Ayutthaya, which had been granted as a community for the Mon refugees by King Borommakot back in 1747. Luang Aphaiphiphat, the leader of the Hokkien Chinese mercenaries from Naikai (內街) or Ayutthayan Chinatown, volunteered to participate in the defenses. With permission from King Ekkathat, Luang Aphaiphiphat led Chinese mercenaries of 2,000 men to face the Burmese under Minkhaung Nawrahta at Phosamton. However, Minkhaung Nawrahta, upon seeing the approach of the Chinese–Siamese forces, did not even wait for his enemies to encamp. Minkhaung Nawrahta attacked the incoming Ayutthayan forces right away, defeating and dispersing the Chinese mercenaries under Luang Aphaiphiphat. This victory allowed Minkhaung Nawrahta to proceed further to Phaniat, where the elephant khedda stood, which was just off the northern wall of Ayutthaya itself.

Northern wall section of Ayutthaya was then exposed to the Burmese. The Burmese took their positions at Phaniat, Wat Chedidaeng temple and Wat Samwiharn temple, all immediately to the north of Ayutthayan wall, preparing to assault the Siamese royal citadel.

=== Peace negotiation attempt ===
King Alaungpaya issued a message to the Siamese;

As the religion of Buddha has not been prospering in Siam, our sovereign has come, as the wout of Embryo Buddha, to promote the welfare and prosperity of Buddha's religion but the Siamese king has neither showed his submission by offering elephants, horses and royal children, nor issued a challenge to fight in open battle; and our Lord, having Buddhahood as his final aim, has released Siamese nobles captured at Thapanbon (Suphanburi) without doing any harm.

Upon receiving the offensive message from the Burmese, Siamese Ayutthayan court issued a corresponding message;

In the present cycle of Bhadra-Kalpa, only five Buddhas are to appear of whom four, namely Kakusandha, Koṇāgamana, Kassapa and Gautama, have already appeared and have entered the Nirvana and there is only the Maitreya Buddha to appear but he is still at Tushita heaven. What kind of Embryo Buddha is the Burmese Lord?, as there are five Buddhas at most that will appear in any Kalpa cycles and there has never been any precedences in which the sixth Buddha appears.

Chaophraya Aphairacha the Siamese Prime Minister (Abaya Yaza in Burmese) told King Ekkathat and King Uthumphon that the rainy season was coming and the Burmese were obliged to abandon their grounds in Ayutthayan outskirts because they would be required to move their elephants, horses and people onto the upper grounds. And when the Burmese were retreating, Ayutthaya should send pursuing forces to strike the Burmese in the rear. There was no need to send out Siamese armies to fight losing battles with the Burmese. Ayutthaya should focus on strengthening the defenses and waiting for the rainy season to arrive, when Burmese retreat would be inevitable. Both Ekkathat and Uthumphon agreed with his strategy. Uthumphon also issued orders for other peripheral Siamese cities to hold their position inside of their citadels instead of going offensives.

Ayutthayan royal court also bought time for rainy season to come by sending three Siamese officials to negotiate for peace on around 6 April. The three Siamese envoys went out to meet Minkhaung Nawrahta to the north of Ayutthaya. Minkhaung Nawrahta, in turn, sent those envoys to Prince Myedu at his camps. Siamese envoys proposed for Ayutthaya to send elephants and horses as tributes to Alaungpaya. Prince Myedu, however, refused to allow the Siamese envoys to go to meet with Alaungpaya at Bangban, citing that his father Alaungpaya had come to uphold and preserve Buddhism in Siam and that Alaungpaya had issued order for the Siamese king to come. If the Siamese king wanted peace, he should come to bow to Alaungpaya himself. With this negotiation attempt apparently failed, the Siamese envoys returned.

=== Burmese attacks on Ayutthaya ===
With the Siamese fortifying themselves in their citadel not going out to engage in open battles, the Burmese were left with no choice but to attack Ayutthaya right away. Minkhaung Nawrahta led his Burmese vanguard forces to approach Ayutthayan northern wall at Phaniat on 8 April. Next day, on 9 April, fires broke out inside of Ayutthaya. Ekkathat and Uthumphon were suspicious of any Burmese collaborators inside of the citadel causing the fire. It was then resolved that Chaophraya Phrakhlang, the Prime Minister under Ekkathat, was to be imprisoned.

With the Burmese attacking and occupying northern section of Ayutthayan suburbs, the Ayutthaya royal court had to move royal ceremonial barges adorned with gold and royal mercantile ships to the southern moat, called Thaikhu (ท้ายคู), for safety. Remaining Ayutthayan people who had not yet seek safety inside of Ayutthayan walls also congregated at the southern section. Southern outskirts of Ayutthaya was also where Westerners lived. There had been a Portuguese community called Ban Portuket and the Dutch trade factory of Dutch East India Company at the southern riparian checkpoint. On 11 April, the Burmese proceeded to burn down all Siamese vernecular houses in Ayutthayan outskirts outside of city walls.

On 13 April 1760, a group of 2,000 Burmese men surprisingly attacked the southern outskirts of Ayutthaya, massacring the populace taking refuge there. The Burmese indiscriminately killed Ayutthayan people of all ages. Their bodies were piled up, filling the river and city moat so that the water could not be used. Most of Siamese royal ceremonial barges and royal trading galleons were burnt down and destroyed. The Burmese proceeded to attack the Dutch factory. Dutch and Chinese trading ships were destroyed and burnt down. Nicolaas Bang, the Dutch opperhoofd of Ayutthaya, was injured and died from drowning, along with his Siamese wife, while trying to escape the Burmese.

Starting on 14 April, the Burmese began bombarding the city itself for the next three days. The Burmese stationed their cannons at Wat Ratchaphli and Wat Kasattrawat temples off the western portion of Ayutthayan wall to fire their cannons into the Ayutthaya citadel, killing a number of people, damaging a number of houses and frightening the populace. Uthumphon the temple king then rode an elephant to patrol the city, enforcing military defenses and cheering up Ayutthayan people. Uthumphon also ordered Siamese cannons at Satkop Fort (northwestern corner of Ayutthaya) and Mahachai fort (northeastern corner of Ayutthaya) to fire at the Burmese to the west in response, causing the Burmese to cease firing and retreat back to their camps

Two days later, on 16 April, the Burmese stationed their cannons Wat Na Phramen temple just off the northern wall, firing directly onto Ayutthayan royal palace. Burmese cannon fires struck Suriyat Amarin Palace the royal residence of King Ekkathat, causing the palace spire to collapse.

== Burmese retreat ==
=== Illness of Alaungpaya ===
According to French and Thai sources, Alaungpaya fell ill on 16 April 1760 (second waxing of the sixth month). Thai chronicles tell that, for reasons unknown to the Siamese, the Burmese retreated from their frontlines at northern outskirts of Ayutthaya on 16 April. French missionaries in Ayutthaya recorded that the Burmese hastily retreat from the war front in the night of 16 April, which was the same day when the Burmese were bombarding Ayutthaya from Wat Na Phramen temple to the north, causing damages to the royal palace. It was then assumed that Alaungpaya might be injured from a cannon explosion during the Burmese operations against Ayutthaya on 16 April. However, in fact, Alaungpaya likely did not engage himself in the frontlines but stayed at his main base at Bangban to the northwest of Ayutthaya. He was suffering from either dysentery or scrofula. According to the Siamese sources, he was wounded by the bursting of a shell from a battery whose installation he was personally supervising but the Burmese sources definitely state that he became ill with dysentery. There was no reason for the Burmese chronicles to hide the truth since it is more glorious for a Burmese king to die of wounds received on the battlefield than to die of a common ailment. Moreover, if he had been wounded in the full view of the army, it would have been known to the whole army, creating confusion.

As Alaungpaya the Burmese king fell ill, ten days after arrival of the Siamese envoys, he called for a war council to be held at his main camp at Bangban to decide the future course of the war. Alaungpaya said that the Siamese kept holing up in their citadel, not engaging in open battles. Ayutthaya had sent envoys, promising to bring tributes but those had not been realized. Treacherous Siamese wet season was going to arrive soon and the Burmese had to decide what to do next. Prince Thiri Damayaza of Myedu, Alaungpaya's son, told his father that Siam's blank promise to send tributes was only to buy time for the rainy season to arrive. Prince Myedu proposed the general retreat of Burmese forces for the sake of Alaungpaya's health, comforting his father that he could try to conquer Ayutthaya again next dry season.

Minkhaung Nawrahta the vanguard commander agreed with Prince Myedu, saying that Ayutthaya was a formidable citadel surrounded with moat and many canals and manned by Portuguese gunners. Ayutthaya city had not been completely destroyed and annihilated before and, therefore, it was full of food provisions, elephants, horses and weapons. Supposedly 'indestructible' Ayutthaya would stand no chance against the might of the Burmese king when he was in full health. Burmese conquest of Ayutthaya was inevitable. But given the indisposition of Alaungpaya, Minkhaung Nawrahta suggested that they should abandon the campaign for once, especially when the court astrologers were against this expedition and try again next year with secured victory.

Moreover, Minkhaung Nawrahta pointed out the flaws of this campaign to Alaungpaya;

- Schedule: Alaungpaya was too late on his schedule to conquer Ayutthaya. The Burmese left Rangoon in Pyatho (January) and had to go through the lengthy route through Tavoy, Tenasserim, Western Siamese towns, only reaching Ayutthaya in Tagu (April), taking whole three months, leaving with little time of achieve the goal before arrival of the rainy season in Kason (May). In order to conquer Ayutthaya in due time, major Siamese peripheral cities should be taken by Nadaw (December) or Pyatho (January).
- Invasion route: Alaungpaya had to take the invasion through Tavoy and Tenasserim through Singkhon Pass, which was a lengthy, non-direct route to Ayutthaya because he had to subjugate the rebellious city-state of Tavoy first. Minkhaung Nawrahta proposed the plan in invade Siam in three directions; from Rahaeng, from Tak and from Tenasserim.

=== Burmese retreat ===
Upon the beseeching of Minkhaung Nawrahta and Prince Myedu, Alaungpaya consented to the general retreat. The Burmese command kept Alaungpaya's serious illness a secret and ordered a general withdrawal, giving the excuse that the king was indisposed. The king selected the friend of his childhood, Minkhaung Nawrahta, for the signal honor of commanding the rearguard. These were the "pick of the army"—500 Manipuri cavalry and 6,000 infantrymen, every man of whom had a musket. After staying in Ayutthayan outskirts for about twenty days, Alaungpaya left his main base at Bangban and began his journey on the next day on 17 April 1760, leaving Minkhaung Nawrahta and his regiment as rearguard against any possible Siamese attacks in Burmese rear. One day after Alaungpaya's departure, Minhla Nawrata, with 3,000 men, followed Alaungpaya in the rear in order to act as the intermediary between Alaungpaya's main army and Minkhaung Nawrahta's rearguard.

It was two days before the Siamese realized that the main Burmese army had left. On 20 April, King Uthumphon then ordered Siamese commanders the new Phraya Yommaraj and Phraya Siharaj Decho to bring forces to pursue and attack the Burmese in the rear. Phraya Yommaraj completely surrounded Minkhaung Nawrahta at Ban Kum, Bangban, leading to the Battle of Ban Kum. Minkhaung Nawrahta's subordinates called for the retreat but Minkhaung Nawrahta persisted, saying that they should stand firm in order to protect Alaungpaya's rear. If they retreated, the Siamese would be sure to follow to reach Alaungpaya's main forces. Minkhaung Nawrahta ordered Burmese forces, 1,500 men each, to break Siamese encirclement in the south, west, north and Minkhaung Nawrahta himself going for the east. Breaking Siamese encirclement in four directions simultaneously was successful. Phraya Yommaraj and his Siamese forces were routed and defeated. Minhla Nawrata, who had been following Alaungpaya in the rear, upon hearing gunshot sounds, hurried back to help Minkhaung Nawrahta. However, Minkhaung Nawrahta had already drove off the Siamese pursuers and told his comrade Minhla Nawrata to focus on guarding Alaungpaya's back not to worry about him.

Minkhaung Nawrahta stood as rearguard at Bangban for five more days, only leaving when he was sure that the Siamese would not follow, presumably on 25 April. Minkhaung Nawrahta also left four cannons, each with three to four inches of caliber, burying them at Ban Kum. Uthumphon ordered Siamese men to search for what the Burmese had left in their former campsite. The Siamese found the four large Burmese cannons, excavated them and took them back to Ayutthaya. With the Burmese retreat, the eventual fall of Ayutthaya was postponed for seven years.

=== Death of Alaungpaya ===
Prince Myedu had his father the ailing king Alaungpaya placed on a litter to be transported back to Burma. Prince Myedu led the Burmese forces to return to Burma through Tak and Mae Lamao or Mae Sot Pass, which was the shortest way from Ayutthaya to Martaban. Prince Myedu also conquered the Siamese town of Kamphaengphet on the way. When the royal retinue reached Tak, they turned west, going through Myawaddy towards Martaban. Alaungpaya died on Sunday of 11 May 1760 (12th waning of Kason, 1122 ME), midway between Myawaddy and Martaban in modern Kinwya village in Bilin Township, Thaton District in modern Mon state, at the age of 45 and having reigned for eight years. Eventual death of Alaungpaya, however, was kept in utmost secrecy to prevent confusion and upheaval. Only Prince Myedu and the king's closest attendants knew about it. Prince Myedu sent a messenger on horseback to inform his elder brother Prince Thiri Thudamayaza of Tabayin, who had been the Upayaza or heir presumptive and had been administering the royal capital of Shwebo since Alaungpaya's departure in mid-1759, about the death of their father. Alaungpaya's body continued to be placed on the litter on the journey and it was pretended that he was still alive, sending out royal orders everyday.

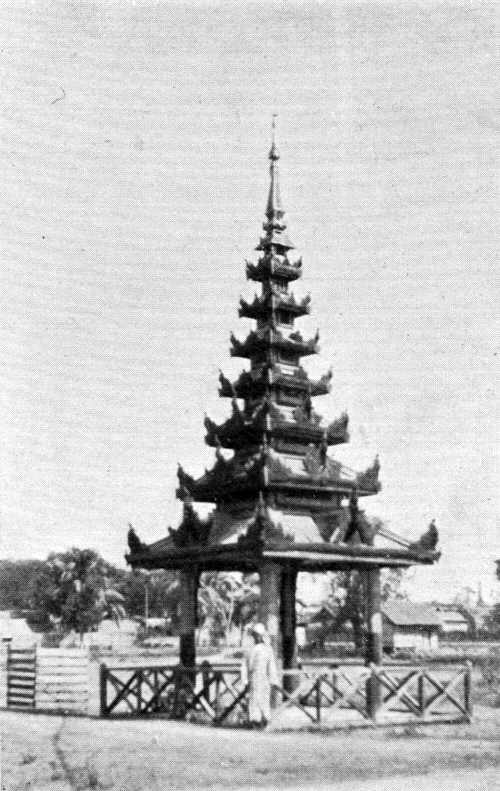
Image of the Tomb of King Alaungpaya in Shwebo from The Silken East by Vincent Clarence Scott O'Connor, published in 1904.

Body of Alaungpaya was then placed on a royal barge to be transported on waters to Pegu and to Rangoon. At Rangoon, public announcement was made on the demise of Alaungpaya. Prince Myedu continued to lead Alaungpaya's retinue on the Irrawaddy river northwards. The whole royal court of Shwebo went out to receive the body of Alaungpaya at Kyaukmyaung pier. Alaungpaya was then conducted to enter the royal city of Shwebo through the Hlaingtha Gate. Alaungpaya was eventually buried at the place of his original village – the Moksobo village – to the southeast of the Shwebo Palace.

== Analysis ==
=== Contrasting Burma and Siam ===
In the eighteenth century, most traditional polities in Continental Southeast Asia had been experiencing political intrigues, declining central authority, political fragmentation, diminishing military supremacy and decline in manpower control, representing the general instability of the region. In mid-to-late eighteenth century to early nineteenth century, these polities experienced destructive cataclysmic changes to give way to more powerful, effective, unified polities with increasing regional military dominance. Burma was the first kingdom to undergo this change, followed by Siam and then Vietnam. In eighteenth century, both Burma and Siam suffered from the decline of manpower and manpower control. In the last decades of the Toungoo dynasty, Burma's effective manpower had lost to private princely ownerships and slavery. In case of Siam, the flourishing trade with Qing China prompted the Siamese people to avoid military conscriptions in order to partake in other economic activities – the problem that the Siamese Ayutthayan court can only minimally fix.

Fall of the Burmese Kingdom of Ava and the Toungoo dynasty in 1752 to the Mons of Restored Hanthawaddy Kingdom gave an opportunity for a new, more competent regime to rise. Alaungpaya, from his native village of Moksobo, with his impressive military strategy and charismatic leadership, precipitously rose to power and turned the tide of battles in quick sways. During 1752–1759, Alaungpaya and his new Burmese regime fought through rival regimes in Upper Burma, the Mons of Lower Burma, the Shans to the east and Manipur to the northwest. Burmese high-ranking positions were given to a new class of military commanders and personnel rather than traditional political nobility, militarizing Burmese elite and society, as Burma had been in the state of wars constantly since 1740. The likely reason for Burmese success is that the Burmese, who had been fighting successive wars since 1740, were "battle-hardened" in the process. Burmese military leaders were all "self-made military men", all of whom had substantial military experience under their belt. Burmese flawed conscription system of Toungoo dynasty was readily fixed by Alaungpaya's military reforms, enabling effective military conscription and mobilization. Alaungpaya's royal order on proper usage of European muskets, which he had acquired through both trade and coercion, in December 1759 signified his emphasis on effective utilization of firearms.

Siam, on the other hand, had not experienced any major external wars since the Burmese–Siamese War of 1661–1662. Ever since the Siamese revolution of 1688 and the establishment of the Ban Phlu Luang dynasty, Ayutthaya had been in the period of internal political conflicts and struggles in 1703, 1733 and 1758 and major regional rebellions in 1689 and 1699–1700. Siamese kings had attempted to curb the rising power of the princes by controlling manpower allocation through the creation of Kroms, manpower regiments, which was more or less successful at preventing princely conflicts. The rise in numbers of Phrai Som or private princely servants in Krom regiments further weakened direct royal government manpower. Succession crises of 1733 and 1758 took great toll on Siamese political cohesion. Siamese court had been badly divided into princely factions since the death of Chaophraya Chamnan Borrirak the Siamese Prime Minister in 1753. Siam, therefore, concentrated its energy internally on dealing with and preventing internal conflicts, leaving no room for military reforms to empower its own defense, let alone recognizing external threats. The incident of execution of Prince Thammathibet, King Borommakot's son and heir, in 1756, sent Ayutthayan royal court into political upheaval that will continue after Borommakot's death in 1758 and only briefly ended in late 1758 at the exile of Prince Kromma Muen Thepphiphit to Sri Lanka. Siamese military, had been mostly in disuse since 1662, deteriorated in the face of the new round of Burmese incursions in 1760. While Burma had already reconstituted itself into a unified militarized power, Siam remained a troubled polity with disused defense.

Siam had sent its military forces to Vientaine in 1695, Cambodia in 1717 and 1749 and to Pattani in 1692, 1709 and 1712 but most of these campaigns resulted in peaceful negotiation and surrenders rather than active rigorous warfare. Siamese military force was for display of power to impose political demands rather than for actual battles. Traditional Siamese bureaucracy did not have clear distinction between civil and military duties. Siamese court ministers and administrators were expected to perform both civil and military duties, commanding armies in wartime and administering civil affairs in peace time. During the Burmese invasion of Siam by Alaungpaya in 1760, Chaophraya Phrakhlang the Minister of Trade and Foreign Affairs, Phraya Rattanathibet the Minister of Palace Affairs and Phraya Yommaraj the Head of Police Bureau were sent against battle-hardened Burmese commanders. Only Kalahom minister had direct military duties but the power of Kalahom had been greatly reduced in royal succession crisis incident of 1733.

=== Alaungpaya's strategy ===
When King Alaungpaya fell ill during his campaign in Siam in April 1760, he called for a war council to decide the next move. HIs son Prince Myedu (later King Hsinbyushin) and his childhood friend and vanguard commander Minkhaung Nawrahta convinced the Burmese king to abandon his campaign as the Siamese rainy season was coming that would cripple Burmese standing in Ayutthayan outskrits. Minkhaung Nawrahta pointed out the flaws in Alaungpaya's campaign in Siam as follows, resulting in his eventual failure to conquer Ayutthaya;

First, Alaungpaya started his campaign too late, meaning he did not have enough time to push through Siamese peripheral cities and to lay siege on Ayutthaya with enough time to pressure the Siamese capital city into surrender. Alaungpaya had left his royal city of Shwebo in July 1759 but spent the majority of his time dealing with the British at Negrais and making merits at the Shwedagon Pagoda at Rangoon. Perhaps he had not intended to conquer Ayutthaya that year until he learned of Siamese provocations, the Siamese seizure of the ship, in September 1759. Alaungpaya only made official declaration to conquer Ayutthaya and Chiang Mai in September 1759. Alaungpaya and his Burmese forces were scheduled to leave Rangoon on 7 December but was two weeks late and eventually left on 21 December. Alaungpaya had to make his way through the whole Tenasserim Coast, from Tavoy to Mergui, eventually entering the Siamese side of the peninsula on the Gulf of Siam Coast in March 1760. Facing weak Siamese resistance, Alaungpaya and the Burmese quickly made their way to the outskirts of Ayutthaya in late March 1760 to lay siege on the city. This left the Burmese with about one month to pressure Ayutthaya into surrender before the arrival of rainy season in May. Ayutthaya, with strong walls strengthened by French architects in the reign of King Narai and with abundant food and weapon supplies, certainly will not yield in one month. Minkhaung Nawrahta suggested that, in order to conquer Ayutthaya, the Burmese should start the campaign very early in dry season, conquering Siamese peripheral cities by December or January.

Second was the invasion route. Usually, Burmese invasion routes into Siam were through the Three Pagodas Pass through Kanchanaburi or Mae Lamao Pass through Tak. If Chiang Mai was under Burmese control, the Burmese would descend from the north also. Alaungpaya, in his campaign, did not only intend to conquer Ayutthaya but also to conquer Tavoy as well. As Siam did not have control over Tavoy, Tavoy had become an independent city-state after the fall of Toungoo dynasty in 1752. Alaungpaya had been declaring Tavoy to be in rebellion against him, not a city under Siamese control and his conquest of Tavoy in December 1759 was the last pinning point of his reunification of Burma. Only when Alaungpaya had successfully conquered Tavoy and was approaching Mergui that Alaungpaya sent messages to Ayutthaya as he was about to enter Siamese territories. Invasion through the whole Tenasserim Coast from Tavoy to Mergui, passing through the Singkhon Pass and then conquering through Western Siamese peripheral towns like Kuiburi, Phetchaburi, Ratchaburi and Suphanburi was not the shortest route, taking Alaungpaya the whole three months from December 1759 to March 1760. Mingkhaung Nawrahta suggests that they should take a shorter, more direct invasion route next time.

Hastiness and rashness of Burmese commanders were also concerning. After entering the Gulf of Siam Coast, Burmese commanders, finding Siamese military defense incredibly weak, rushed in competition to seek glory for the inevitable conquests. Alaungpaya had to issue many orders restraining the vanguard commanders to prevent them from advancing too far, risking being attacked or encircled by the Siamese without support from the main royal forces of Alaungpaya. In the Battle of Talan, Prince Myedu, in his urgency and hastiness, did not wait for the main forces of his father Alaungpaya to arrive, ordered his vanguard forces to cross the Talan River to charge at the Siamese right away, resulting in initial Burmese casualties. Only with timely arrival of Alaungpaya to the battlefield that the Burmese were reinforced and able to push through the Siamese.

=== Siamese strategy ===
Ayutthaya has a traditional strategy of passive stand against the invaders and besiegers, relying on the impressively strong walls and natural phenomenon including the arrival of rainy wet season and the inundation of Ayutthayan outskrits to ward off the invaders. In the late sixteenth century, King Naresuan had utilized more active defense strategy by reaching out to deal with the invaders at the frontiers and periphery instead of passively standing in the Ayutthayan citadel. However, those military fervor and sentiments had been long gone after two centuries of absence of serious external threats. Initial Siamese response to the incoming of Alaungpaya's Burmese armies showcases the state of disuse and deterioration of Siamese defense system. The intelligence system was not accurate and virtually did not exist. King Ekkathat was panicked by false information that the Burmese came from three directions; north, west and south. Only later when the Siamese king realized that the Burmese only came through the Singkhon pass that he concentrated his forces on that front. Siamese commanders, who were mostly civilian administrators turned military commanders for the occasion, cowered in the face of the militaristic energy of "battle-hardened" Burmese commanders and fighting forces. Siamese attempt to deal with the invaders at the periphery was not possible due to inexperienced nature of Siamese commanders and personnel, who were not shameful to quickly retreat in the face of advancing Burmese troops. In Thai historiography, the only valiant figure in this war was Khun Rong Palat Chu, a mid-ranking officer who made a desperate stand against the overwhelming Burmese forces at Wakhao beach in modern Prachuap Khiri Khan.

Ekkathat ordered that all provincial governors abandon their cities and bring their forces to defend Ayutthaya. This overly-centralized defense strategy was characteristic of this period. City governors, including the governor of Phetchaburi, were obliged to abandon their cities to the mercy of Burmese invaders. Ayutthaya had no intention to preserve its own provincial cities, focusing solely on safeguarding the royal capital city of Ayutthaya. The Burmese then marched through Siamese peripheral cities with less-than-expected resistance all the way to the outskirts of Ayutthaya. The city of Phetchaburi surrendered peacefully to Alaungpaya in March 1760, leaving the city intact and unharmed.

With Alaungpaya's conquest of Suphanburi, just kilometers to the west of Ayutthaya, the Ayutthayan court and populace panicked in great consternation as the Burmese had not come this close to Ayutthaya since 1586, about two centuries ago. The Siamese king Ekkathat was sidelined as the royal court and populace asked Uthumphon the temple king and Ekkathat's younger brother, who had been the king once but abdicated in favor of his elder brother in 1758, whom the general populace considered more-capable, to leave monkhood to assume military commands in the face of the renewed Burmese invasion. Uthumphon complied with the popular request and left his temple to assume commands. On the papers, Uthumphon ran jointly with his elder brother Ekkathat in the commands but Uthumphon had to stage a seizure of power in order to assume powers. Siam's divided princely factional politics came into play. Pro-Uthumphon supporters, who had been imprisoned in 1758, were released and resumed their positions, while pro-Ekkathat supporters were punished and imprisoned. It was a tumultuous factional overturn in Siamese bureaucracy. When Ayutthayan commanders went out to fight the Burmese, others were being whipped with rattan cane blows as political punishment. The Siamese commanders, who were captured by the Burmese in the Battle of Talan and then released, blamed each other for the failures to divert their guilts as court politics took over military commands. Chaophraya Phrakhlang the Siamese Prime Minister was even imprisoned for his suspected collaboration with the Burmese.

Disuse and deterioration of Siamese defense system, combined with inexperience due to long hiatus from external invasions and factional court politics, rendered Siam unable to defend itself against the Burmese invasion. Eventually, Siamese traditional strategy of passive defense succeeded for the last time as King Alaungpaya and the Burmese were obliged to retreat in April 1760 by the upcoming arrival of rainy season. However, this fortunate success was short-lived, postponing the final fall of Ayutthaya only for seven years.

== Subsequent Events ==
=== Conflicts in Burma ===
On his deathbed, Alaungpaya dictated that Burmese royal succession should be in agnatic seniority from elder to younger brothers so that all of his sons would reign. Prince Myedu was the most prominent militarily, known for his conquest of Ava in 1754 and his roles during his father's campaign in Siam in 1760. However, Myedu was Alaungpaya's second son. Alaungpaya's first son, Prince Thiri Thudamayaza of Tabayin, had been appointed as Upayaza or heir presumptive to Alaungpaya and had been administering the kingdom since Alaungpaya's departure from Shwebo in mid-1759. After some hassle, Prince Myedu eventually submitted to his elder brother Prince Tabayin. Prince Tabayin ascended the throne as King Naungdawgyi the second reigning king of the Konbaung dynasty.

King Naungdawgyi began his reign by summoning suspicious military generals to Shwebo and had them executed. Among them was Minkhaung Nawrahta, who had been assigned as the rearguard commander with 10,000 men retreating from Siam. The new king ordered his uncle Prince Thado Theinkathu of Toungoo, who was also brother of Alaungpaya, to arrest Minkhaung Nawrahta while marching through the city of Toungoo. Minkhaung Nawrahta, however, managed to escape the capture at Toungoo with his men. Minkhaung Nawrahta then rebelled against Naungdawgyi, joined by a large number of Burmese musketeers and other military men. Minkhaung Nawrahta seized Ava as his base in May 1760 with 12,000 men. After failed reconciliations, in June 1760, King Naungdawgyi marched his 50,000 Burmese men from Shwebo to Sagaing, which was just opposite of Ava on the Irrawaddy River, to lay siege on Ava. Also in June, Naungdawgyi held official Rajabhisekha enthronement ceremony at Sagaing, moving the royal seat to Sagaing and appointing his younger brother Prince Myedu as Ainshemin or heir.

During the siege of Ava, Captain Walter Alves, a British representative, visited King Naungdawgyi at Sagaing in September 1760, demanding reparation and compensation for Burmese massacre of the British at Negrais a year earlier in October 1759. Naungdawgyi wanted to maintain relations with the British for access to firearms but did not accede that his father Alaungpaya had done wrong. Alves was treated with indignity and any concessions were refused. Burma agreed to release remaining British prisoners and allowed the British to retain their trade outpost at Bassein. However, the British deemed trade in Burma unprofitable and eventually decided to leave Burma. Burmese royal forces attacked Ava many times but failed. Lavine, the French man who had instigated the Negrais massacre, was killed during one of the battles of the siege. King Naungdawgyi besieged Ava for seven months until his opponent Minkhaung Nawrahta became starved and low in supplies. Minkhaung Nawrahta evacuated his forces from Ava and fled in December 1760, allowing Naungdawgyi to take over Ava. Minkhaung Nawrahta was shot dead during his escape in outskirts of Ava. After subjugating the rebellion of Minkhaung Nawrahta, King Naungdawgyi then returned the royal seat to Shwebo.

Next year, in late 1761, King Naungdawgyi's uncle Prince Thado Theinkathu of Toungoo also rebelled. The Prince of Toungoo attacked Prome and sought assistance from the chastised former Hanthawaddy Mon commander Talaban, who had been taking refuge at Kawgun cave (in modern Hpa-An, Kayin state) upstream from the town of Martaban and Binnya Kyin the nephew of Binnya Dala, the ousted King of Hanthawaddy. In November 1761, Naungdawgyi led his army of 30,000 men from Shwebo to lay siege on Toungoo against his rebellious uncle. Meanwhile, Talaban and Binnya Kyin led the Mon forces of 2,000 men to Sittaung to support Prince Thado Theinkathu. Naungdawgyi eventually took Toungoo in January 1762, sparing the life of his uncle and his family – an unusual mercy of a Burmese king. With internal unrests pacified, Burma was ready again for a new round of external warfare.

=== Conflicts in Siam ===
Uthumphon, who had abdicated in 1758 in favor of his elder brother Ekkathat, returned to Ayutthayan royal court, upon the popular request, to assume military commands during the Burmese invasion of 1760, returning to power. With the Burmese retreat, Ayutthaya returned to usual princely political conflicts. Two Siamese kings, Ekkathat and Uthumphon, seemed to peacefully coexist in royal court for a while. Ekkathat soon played with the sensitivity of his younger brother Uthumphon. On one day in June 1760, Uthumphon visited his elder brother Ekkathat but found Ekkathat sitting and putting a bare sword on his laps. This gesture of sword-displaying suggested enmity and discontent. Uthumphon was frustrated that Ekkathat was unhappy about Uthumphon being around in royal court so Uthumphon decided to leave royal court to become a Buddhist monk at Wat Pradu temple again. Uthumphon loyalists also followed their overlord into monkhood, allowing pro-Ekkathat faction to resume powers. After three months in power, the pro-Uthumphon faction was again expelled in favor of Ekkathat's followers. King Ekkathat assigned his nephew Prince Phithakphubet, son of the deceased prince Thammathibet, to oversee the repair of Suriyat Amarin Palace, residence of Ekkathat damaged by Burmese cannon fires during the war.

In February 1761, 600 of Mon refugees at Nakhon Nayok rebelled, taking position at Khao Nangbuat Mountain in modern Sarika, Nakhon Nayok to the east of Ayutthaya. Ekkathat initially sent Ayutthayan royal forces of 2,000 men under Phraya Siharaj Decho to quell the Mon rebels at Khao Nangbuat. The Mon rebels, who were armed with only melee wooden sticks, managed to repel Siamese royal forces. Ekkathat had to send another regiment of 3,000 men under Phraya Yommaraj in order to put down the Mons, showing how ineffective Siamese military had become by 1761.

Prince Kromma Muen Thepphiphit, half-brother of Ekkathat who had been exiled to Sri Lankan Kingdom of Kandy in 1758 for his rebellion attempt, involved in local struggle in Ceylon, in which a faction of local Singhalese nobles and Siam Nikaya monks conspired with the Dutch to overthrow and assassinate King Kirti Sri Rajasinha of Kandy in 1760, intending to put Siamese prince Thepphiphit on the Kandyan throne. However, as King Kirti Sri Rajasinha discovered the plot, Prince Thepphiphit was expelled from Ceylon. After some wandering in the Indian Ocean, Prince Thepphiphit ended up returning to the Siamese port of Mergui in 1761. Ekkathat was shocked and furious at the return of his troublesome half-brother and ordered confinement of Thepphiphit in Tenasserim, not allowing Thepphiphit to return to Ayutthaya.

In 1762, George Pigot the British president governor of Madras sent a British merchant William Powney to renew trade relations with Ayutthaya. William Powney arrived at Siamese royal court and brought with him a lion, an Arabian horse and an ostrich for the Siamese king Ekkathat. Powney also negotiated for Siam to possibly allow the British to establish a trade factory at the Siamese port of Mergui. These renewed Anglo–Siamese relations, however, were cut short by the Fall of Ayutthaya in 1767 five years later.

Burmese control over Tenasserim Coast had not yet been permanent. After the war, Burma retained Tavoy while Mergui and Tenasserim returned to Siam. King Ekkathat appointed a new governor to Tenasserim. In 1763, a certain Burmese official named Udaungza seized power in Tavoy, killing the Konbaung-appointed governor there. Udaungza the self-proclaimed governor of Tavoy pledged alliance to Siam by sending tributes to submit to Ayutthaya. Siam was then able to assume control over the whole Tenasserim Coast again before being conquered permanently by Burma in early 1765.

=== Burmese conquest of Lanna ===
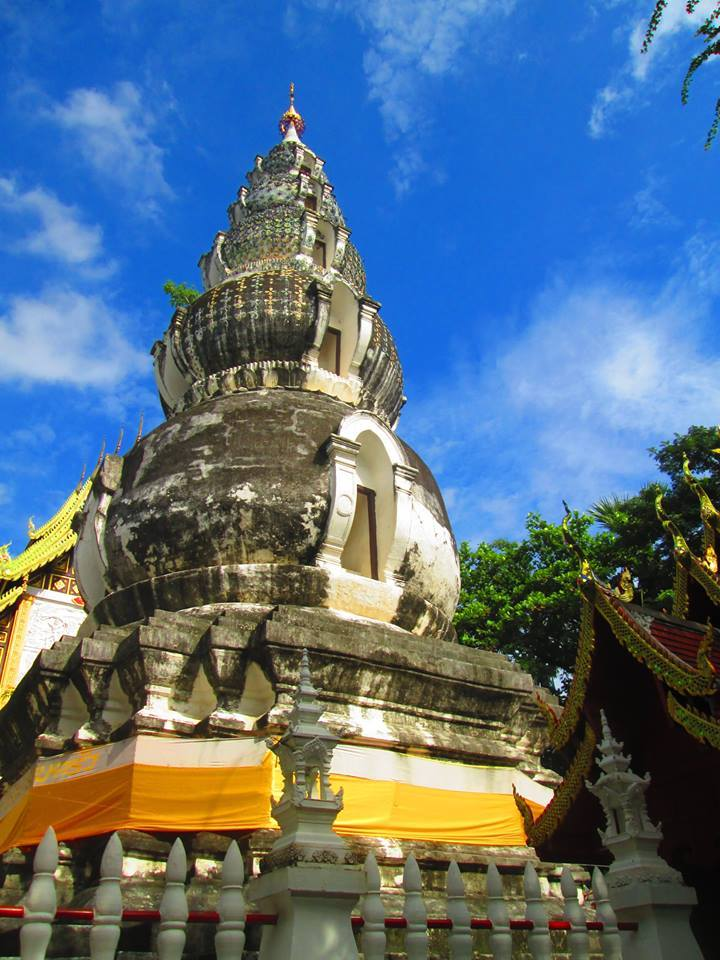
Wat Kutao temple to the north of Chiang Mai was the place where the Burmese took position during the Burmese siege and conquest of Chiang Mai in 1762–1763.

King Ong Kham of Chiang Mai, who had freed Chiang Mai from Burmese rule in 1727 and ruled for three decades until his death in 1759, was succeeded by his son Ong Chan as the new king of Chiang Mai. Ever since his escape from Pegu in 1756, Talaban the Mon military man had been posing threats to Konbaung regime. In 1762, King Naungdawgyi dispatched Burmese troops of 3,500 men to subjugate Talaban at his base near Martaban. Talaban was spared by the Burmese king's mercy and captured alive. Naungdawgyi considered Chiang Mai providing shelter to Talaban and also viewed Lanna or modern Northern Thailand as a part of traditional Burmese area of influence.

The Burmese king sent troops of 7,500 men under Abaya Kamani, with Minhla Thiri as second-in-command, to invade and conquer Chiang Mai. Abaya Kamani and his forces left Shwebo in October 1762, arriving at Chiang Mai in December, laying siege on Chiang Mai. The king of Chiang Mai sent a letter to King Ekkathat of Ayutthaya, asking for military aid against the invading Burmese. After eight months of siege, Abaya Kamani eventually took Chiang Mai on 24 August 1763. Chaophraya Phitsanulok Rueang the governor of Phitsanulok led Northern Siamese troops to rescue Chiang Mai but it was too late as the Burmese had already taken Chiang Mai so the Siamese simply turned back. Abaya Kamani deported nearly the whole Northern Thai population of Chiang Mai to Burma. Among the captives were King Ong Chan of Chiang Mai, his family and Smim Htaw, the former king of Hanthawaddy who had been taking shelter in Chiang Mai since 1749.

The merciful King Naungdawgyi of Burma did not live long to see glorious conquests as he died prematurely at the age of 29 on 28 December 1763 (9th waning of Nadaw, 1125 ME) after reigning for only three years. His younger brother and heir, the Prince Myedu, aged 27, ascended the throne as King Hsinbyushin the third reigning king of Konbaung dynasty. Abaya Kamani and Minhla Thiri returned from Chiang Mai to Shwebo in January 1764 with Lanna war captives and war spoils. The new king Hsinbyushin appointed Abaya Kamani as the Myowun or governor of Chiang Mai and promoted Minhla Thiri to title Maha Nawrahta for their meritorious services. However, during the absence of these conquerors, native rebellions sprang up at Phayao and Lamphun in Lanna against Burma. Hsinbyushin then assigned Ne Myo Thihapate to lead Burmese armies of 20,000 men to thoroughly subjugate and pacify Lanna and to attack Ayutthaya from the north. Nemyo Thihapate left for Lanna in February 1764, conquering Phayao, Lampang, Lamphun and took the rainy season shelter at Nan. The Burmese also took Kengtung and proceeded further to attack Sipsongpanna, which had been under Chinese suzerainty. This would lead to border disputes between Burma and Qing China – one of many precipitating factors of the Sino-Burmese War.

=== Burmese Invasion of Siam in 1765 ===
The new Burmese king Hsinbyushin inherited his father Alaungpaya's energy and military talent. Upon his ascension, Hsinbyushin declared his intentions to achieve the unfinished mission of conquering Siam laid down by his father, to avenge for the insults his father had received during the previous invasion of Siam in 1760, four years earlier. As Prince Myedu, Hsinbyushin had accompanied his father in the Siamese campaign and became familiar with Siamese war strategy and tactics. Hsinbyushin declared before his court that, as Ayutthaya had never completely destroyed before, it would be full of food, firearm supplies and manpower. Nemyo Thihapate's force sent to operate in Lanna with final goal to attack Ayutthaya would not be sufficient so another column was required to attack Ayutthaya from the west through Tavoy. Therefore, King Hsinbyushin assigned Maha Nawrahta to lead the Burmese forces of 20,000 men to reconquer Tavoy and to attack Ayutthaya in another direction. The two routes of Maha Nawrahta and Nemyo Thihapate would converge onto Ayutthaya from two directions; west and north. Maha Nawrahta and his Tavoy column left Shwebo on 1 December 1764 (8th waxing of Nadaw, 1126 ME).

King Gaurisiam of Manipur abdicated in 1761 in favor of his younger brother and Uparaja heir Bhagyachandra, who ascended the Manipuri throne as King Chingthang Khomba or King Jaisingh of Manipur. The new Manipuri king realized potential military threats from powerful Burma so he sent a delegate to conclude a treaty with the British at Chittagong in 1762, promising British aid in case of Burmese attacks. After sending off troops to attack Ayutthaya, King Hsinbyushin himself led Burmese forces to attack Manipur in January 1765. King Jaisingh rode off to face Hsinbyushin in the Battle of Kakching in February 1765 but the Burmese king prevailed. The British from Chittagong came to help but failed to reach Manipur due to rugged geography and illness. Hsinbyushin conquered Manipur and King Jaisingh was obliged to flee, taking refuge at Cachar and requesting aid from Ahom kingdom.

Meanwhile, Maha Nawrahta conquered Tavoy, Mergui and Tenasserim – the whole Tenasserim Coast – in January 1765. Udaungza the self-proclaimed Tavoy governor and Prince Thepphiphit fled to Central Siam. Maha Nawrahta sent vanguard forces to quickly took all Western Siamese towns including Phetchaburi and Ratchaburi in early 1765. King Ekkathat granted Udaungza to take refuge in Chonburi and confined his half-brother Thepphiphit again at Chanthaburi on Eastern Siamese coast. Meanwhile, in the north, Nemyo Thihapate marched from Nan to attack Luang Prabang, successfully taking Luang Prabang in March 1765, vassalizing Lao kingdoms of Luang Prabang and Vientiane under Burmese domination. King Hsinbyushin stayed in Manipur for about a month. The Burmese king appointed Prince Moirang, uncle and political enemy of Jaisingh, as the puppet king of Manipur under Burmese influence, deporting a great number of Meitei people back to Burma. Hsinbyushin contemplated that the royal capital of Shwebo, located at the northwestern corner of Burma, was inconvenient for governance so he moved the Burmese royal seat from Shwebo to Ava in April 1765.

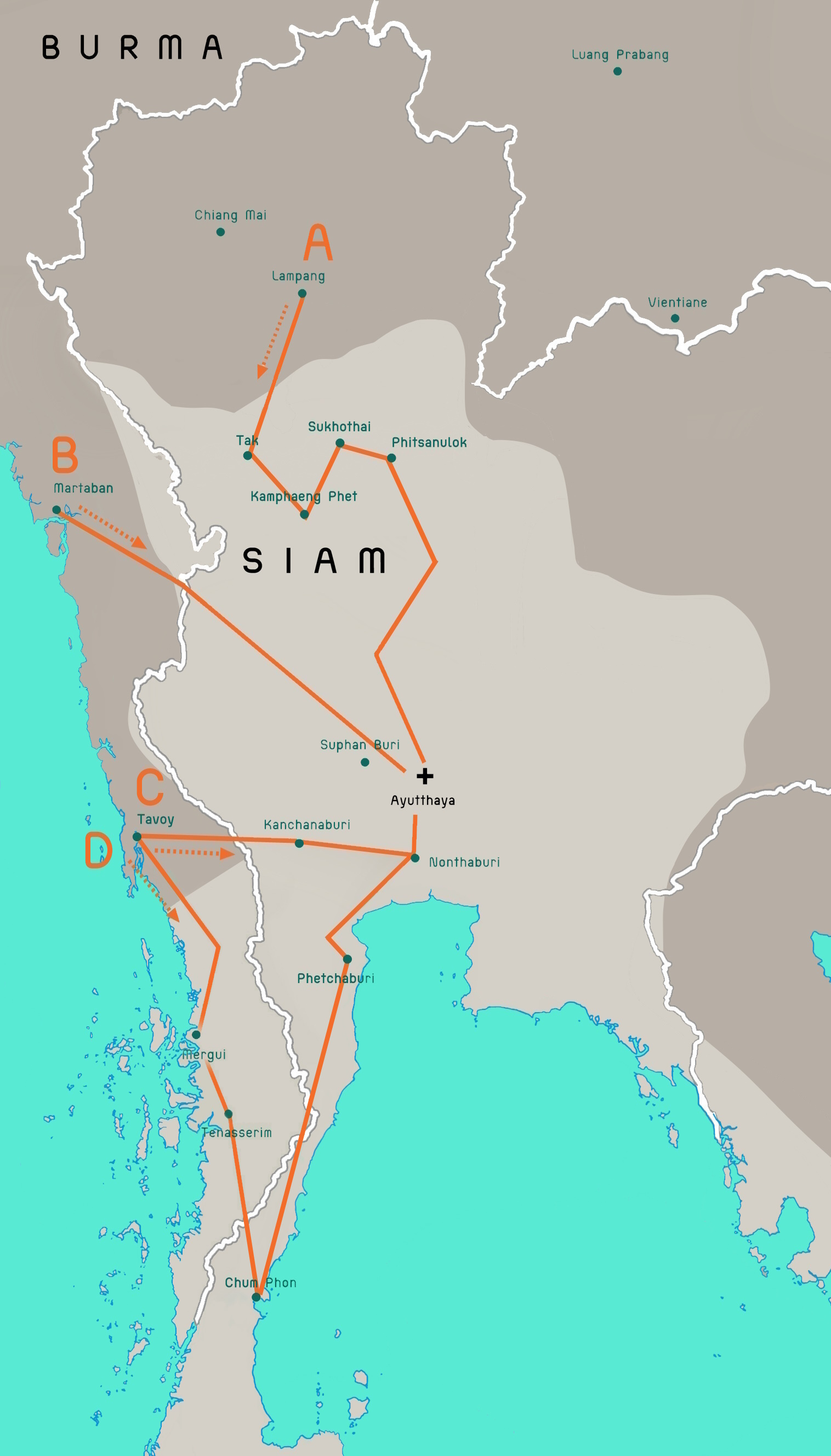
Map showing Burmese invasion routes to Ayutthaya in 1765-1766; Tavoy column under Maha Nawrahta from the west and Chiang Mai Burmese-Lanna column under Nemyo Thihapate from the north.

Burmese conquests of Lanna and Laos allowed Nemyo Thihapate to gather vast manpower and resources for his campaign. Nemyo Thihapate initiate his attack on Siam by marching his Burmese-Lanna forces in August 1765 down south, much earlier than his colleague Maha Nawrahta at Tavoy due to the northern path to Ayutthaya being much longer. Nemyo Thihapate swept through Northern Siamese towns of Sawankhalok, Sukhothai down to Nakhon Sawan and Ang Thong. In October 1765, Maha Nawrahta left Tavoy with his main forces to attack Central Siam, taking Thonburi and Nonthaburi. William Powney, British merchant trading in Ayutthaya, was asked by Ayutthayan court to help repelling the Burmese. Powney, with his small British contingent and Siamese auxiliaries, attacked the Burmese but was defeated in the Battle of Nonthaburi in December 1765. The Burmese converged on Ayutthaya in January 1766, approaching the Siamese royal capital in three directions;

- Maha Nawrahta took position at Siguk to the west of Ayutthaya (modern Bangban district)
- Nemyo Thihapate took position at Paknom Prasop to the north of Ayutthaya (Bang Pahan district)
- Mingyi Kamani Sanda took position at Bangsai to the south of Ayutthaya (Bang Pa-in district)

King Ekkathat of Ayutthaya dispatched his generals Chaophraya Phrakhlang to face Nemyo Thihapate at Paknam Prasop to the north, Phraya Phetchaburi and Phraya Tak to face Maha Nawrahta at Wat Phukhaothong to the west but all of them were repelled.

=== Siege and Fall of Ayutthaya ===
Failing to dislodge the besieging Burmese, by February 1766, Ayutthaya resorted to traditional strategy of passive stand against the invaders, waiting for the rainy season to come and relying on the formidable Ayutthayan wall to protect the city. This strategy worked previously in 1760 when the ailing King Alaungpaya was obliged to retreat upon arrival of the rainy wet season in May. Hsinbyushin, however, solved this limitation by realizing that the campaign to conquer Ayutthaya, not accomplishable within one year, should possibly span several years, pressuring Ayutthayan defenders to yield. When the wet season came, the Burmese besiegers should not retreat but endure and stand their grounds. In September 1766, the Burmese approached closer to Ayutthaya, with Maha Nawrahta at Wat Phukhaothong to the west and Nemyo Thihapate at Phosamton to the north. By November, the Siamese realized that the Burmese would not retreat. The Siamese made several attempts to lift the Burmese siege but failed. By December, the situation became desperate in Ayutthaya, with food resources dwindling, manpower depleting and its people kept running to surrender themselves to the Burmese.

Burmese military activities in Kengtung and Sipsongpanna led to Sino-Burmese border disputes and the Sino-Burmese War. Yang Yingju (楊應琚) the Viceroy of Yungui sent Chinese Green Standard Army to invade Burma, attacking Bhamo in December 1766. Burma then faced war on two fronts – China and Siam. In January 1767, King Hsinbyushin, from his royal capital of Ava, issued an order urging Burmese commanders to finish up the conquest of Ayutthaya in order to divert forces to the Chinese front. Maha Nawrahta and Nemyo Thihapate stepped up the siege by construction of 27 strong battle towers made of bricks surrounding Ayutthaya. Ayutthaya sent out Chinese levies and Portuguese gunners to repel the Burmese in last resort but also failed. Then Maha Nawrahta died from illness, leaving Nemyo Thihapate as the supreme commander.

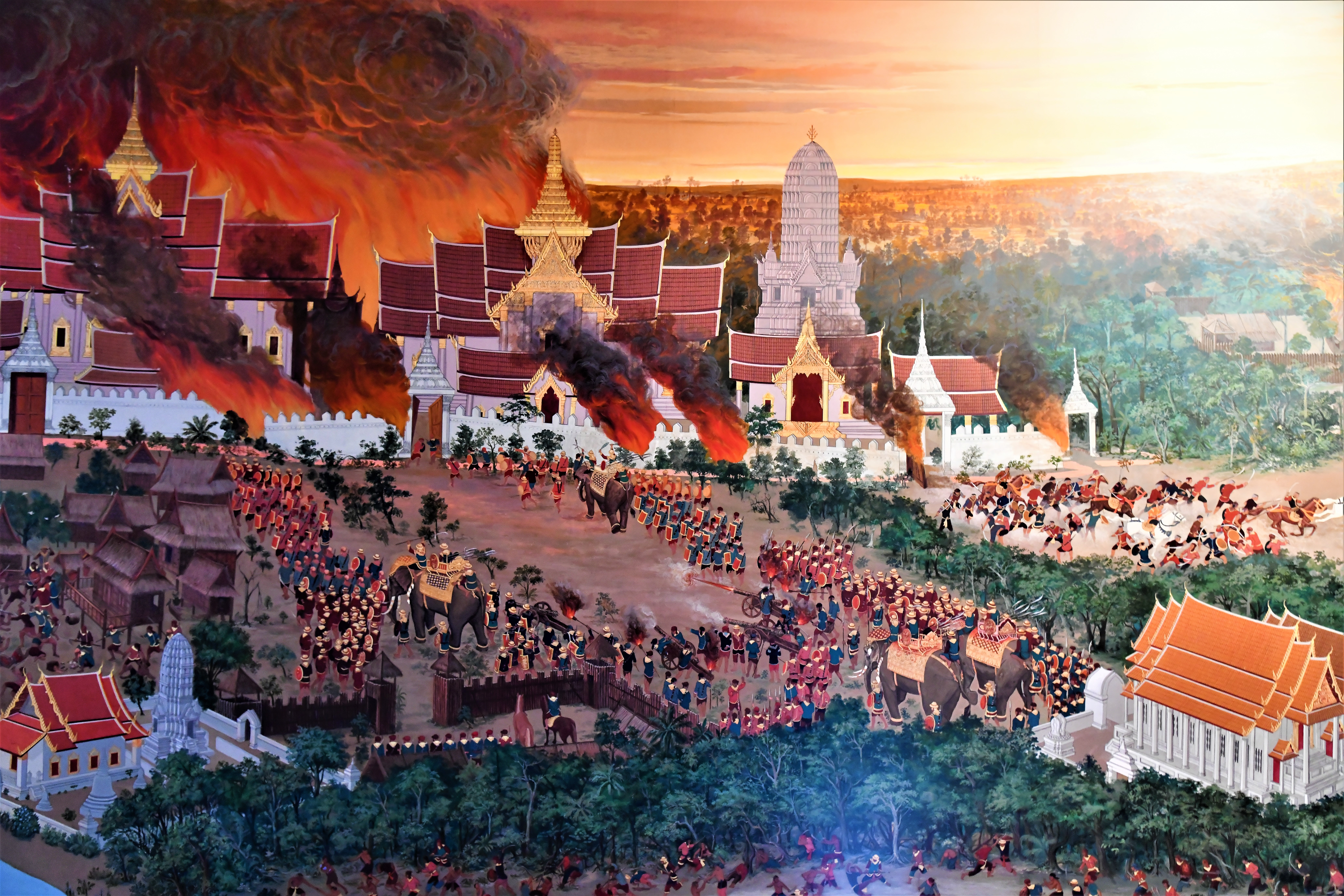
Modern depiction of the Fall of Ayutthaya in April 1767 at National Memorial of Thailand.

Nemyo Thihapate ordered the digging of underground tunnels to circumvent the walls of Ayutthaya. The Burmese set fire to the base of Ayutthayan wall, causing a northeastern portion of the wall to collapse, allowing the Burmese to enter Ayutthaya. After fourteen months of siege, Ayutthaya the Siamese royal capital for four centuries fell to the Burmese on 7 April 1767, seven years after Alaungpaya's attempt to conquer Ayutthaya. It was followed by indiscriminate killing of inhabitants, thorough looting of treasures, destruction of palaces and temples and deportation of 30,000 Ayutthayan inhabitants back to Burma. Ekkathat, the last king of Ayutthaya, died shortly after. Among the captured were Uthumphon the temple king, royal princes and princesses, Siamese weaponry, Siamese craftsmen and cultural artifacts, all were taken back to Burma.

== See also ==
- Burmese-Siamese War (1765-1767)
- Siege of Ayutthaya (1767)
- Burmese-Siamese Wars
- Sino-Burmese War
