= Tukkata chao wang =

Small Sized Thai Dolls

Tukkatar Chaowang (Thai: ตุ๊กตาชาววัง, "The doll of the palace women") is a very delicate Thai doll which comes in a very small size. The smallest one can be only 2 centimeters tall. It is gradually created from soil through the process of baking and painting until it becomes a beautiful doll used to decorate a room. It also represents Thai culture. The name "doll of the palace women" derives from its original version of this doll that was first created among the women in the Grand palace of Thailand a century ago.

== History ==
There are two assumptions about its sources. The first assumption mentions that the doll was originally created by the women working in the palace and another story tells that one royal family woman made it for the little princess. Although its real source has not been clarified yet, both stories show that it came from the royal palace around the period of Rama 4th and 5th (around 1851–1910). After the first introduction of the doll, it became popular among the women in the palace of that period. The last person who made the original version of this doll is “นางแฉ่ง สังคาวาสี” (Mrs. Chang Sungkawasri). She and her sisters were the ones who brought the royal doll from the palace to the ordinary people and made it known by first selling it at a popular fair in the capital part of Thailand. Unfortunately, after a long period, the art of this doll gradually disappeared.

However, there was a revival of the royal doll. Hoping to conserve this tiny doll, Queen Sirikit raised this issue and let the villagers of Bang Sadej area, which is in Angthong province, revive the art in 1976. When it came to a doll of villagers, the old original dolls were carried on and the new villager style is developed.

== Characteristics ==
There are two main styles of the doll, a royal original look and the villagers’ folk style. The primary style in the grand palace were applied from the tender character, the real traditional activities and the lifestyle of the women in the palace, such as the posture these women did to show the respect to the royal family or the colors of the clothes they wore, so the doll looks rather delicate. On the other side, the characteristic of the folk style gives a more local and strong feeling because it represented the villagers’ lives, such as the posture of the children playing the local game. Even though there are some differences in characteristics and the method of creating changed as the time passed, both styles have more value than just a value of dolls for decoration as they contain historical story and culture of Thailand, which can reflect the social situation and way of life in each period.
