= Bang Ban district =

Bang Ban บางบาล
- District
- District location in Ayutthaya province
- Coordinates: 14°22′25″N 100°29′8″E
- Country: Thailand
- Province: Ayutthaya
- Seat: Maha Phram
- Tambon: 16
- Muban: 111

Area
  - Total: 135.3 km^{2} (52.2 sq mi)

Population (2014)
  - Total: 34,579
  - Density: 254.3/km^{2} (659/sq mi)
- Time zone: UTC+7 (ICT)
- Postal code: 13250
- Geocode: 1405

Bang Ban (Thai: บางบาล, pronounced [bāːŋ bāːn]) is a district (amphoe) of Ayutthaya province in central Thailand.

== History ==
The district was originally created in 1894 as Sena Nai District, with its district office in Sai Noi Sub-district. Later Mr Khiao Bangban (นายเขียว บางบาล) donated a piece of land for the building of the new district office in Bang Ban Sub-district. So the government agreed to change the district name to the donor's family name, which became effective in 1917.

== Geography ==
Neighbouring districts are (from the north clockwise) Pa Mok of Ang Thong province, Bang Pahan, Phra Nakhon Si Ayutthaya, Bang Sai, Sena and Phak Hai of Ayutthaya Province.

== Administration ==
=== Central administration ===
The district Bang Ban is divided into 16 sub-districts (tambon), which are further subdivided into 111 administrative villages (Muban).

No.	Name	Thai	Villages	Pop.
1.	Bang Ban	บางบาล	5	1,080
2.	Wat Yom	วัดยม	4	1,551
3.	Sai Noi	ไทรน้อย	10	2,528
4.	Saphan Thai	สะพานไทย	5	2,159
5.	Maha Phram	มหาพราหมณ์	10	4,809
6.	Kop Chao	กบเจา	9	2,625
7.	Ban Khlang	บ้านคลัง	7	2,134
8.	Phra Khao	พระขาว	7	3,778
9.	Nam Tao	น้ำเต้า	8	2,471
10.	Thang Chang	ทางช้าง	6	1,036
11.	Wat Taku	วัดตะกู	9	1,591
12.	Bang Luang	บางหลวง	5	919
13.	Bang Luang Dot	บางหลวงโดด	4	719
14.	Bang Hak	บางหัก	8	1,486
15.	Bang Chani	บางชะนี	5	1,901
16.	Ban Kum	บ้านกุ่ม	9	3,792

=== Local administration ===
There are two sub-district municipalities (thesaban tambon) in the district:

- Bang Ban (Thai: เทศบาลตำบลบางบาล) consisting of the sub-districts Bang Ban, Sai Noi, Bang Luang Dot, Bang Hak, Bang Chani, Ban Kum.
- Maha Phram (Thai: เทศบาลตำบลมหาพราหมณ์) consisting of the sub-districts Wat Yom, Saphan Thai, Maha Phram.

There are four sub-district administrative organizations (SAO) in the district:

- Kop Chao (Thai: องค์การบริหารส่วนตำบลกบเจา) consisting of the sub-district Kop Chao.
- Ban Khlang (Thai: องค์การบริหารส่วนตำบลบ้านคลัง) consisting of the sub-district Ban Khlang.
- Phra Khao (Thai: องค์การบริหารส่วนตำบลพระขาว) consisting of the sub-district Phra Khao.
- Nam Tao (Thai: องค์การบริหารส่วนตำบลน้ำเต้า) consisting of the sub-districts Nam Tao, Thang Chang, Wat Taku, Bang Luang.
