= Khun Rong Palat Chu =

Statue of Khun Rong Palat Chu at Wat Si Roi, Ang Thong province

Khun Rong Palat Chu (Thai: ขุนรองปลัดชู, pronounced [/kʰùt rɔːŋ plàt tɕʰuː]) was a minor noble and deputy administrator in the Department of Local Governance at Wiset Chai Chan, now part of Ang Thong province in central Thailand. He is often considered an unsung hero of the early resistance against the Burmese invasions during the late Ayutthaya period.

His title, Khun, indicated a rank of nobility, and Rong Palat referred to his position as a deputy civil officer, while Chu was his first name. Additionally, it is believed that he may once have served as the governor of Kui Buri.

He is mentioned in only two brief lines in the Chronicles of Ayutthaya. Nevertheless, in popular history, he is regarded as a master of Attamat (อาทมาฏ, [ʔàːt.tʰá.màːt]) (Note: A traditional Thai fighting style using a two-handed sabre. It combined speed, precision, and fluid movement.) swordsmanship. This discipline involved the use of a double-handed Thai sabre, known for its agility and cutting power. Around the year 1760, during the reign of King Suriyamarin (better known as King Ekkathat), Khun Rong Palat Chu assembled a force of approximately 400 trained fighters from Wiset Chai Chan to intercept a Burmese army of around 8,000 troops advancing under King Alaungpaya.

Their campaign led them to Ao Wa Khao, now within the present-day boundaries of Ao Manao in Prachuap Khiri Khan province. All 400 men perished in the encounter; no reinforcements were dispatched from the central court.

In contrast, the village defence at Bang Rachan, which took place five years later, from mid-August 1765 to late January 1766, became widely remembered in popular Thai history; Khun Rong Palat Chu's story, however, remained largely overlooked.

Approximately eleven years after the battle, local residents in Wiset Chai Chan established Wat Si Roi, or "Temple of the Four Hundred", in honour of the fallen men. A shrine has also been erected near the presumed site of the skirmish.

Public awareness of his story grew significantly in 2011, when a historical film titled Unsung Hero, based on Khun Rong Palat Chu's life and final campaign, was premiered at Scala Cinema in July that year. The screening was open to the public free of charge. Following this, the film was aired on Thai PBS and later adapted into a nine-part television series broadcast during the station's late-night educational programming. The programme was shown after the evening news every Monday night, with each episode followed by an in-depth panel discussion featuring scholars and experts from various fields. The production was supported by DTAC and received financial backing from Boonchai Bencharongkul. More than a sponsor, Boonchai was also the driving force behind the project, inspired by a desire to foster a sense of local historical awareness and pride in one's homeland.

== See more ==
- Burmese–Siamese War (1759–1760)
- Burmese–Siamese War (1765–1767)
- Bang Rachan
- Daab Chao Ram
