= Yok Siam Year 2 =

Thai quiz show

Yok Siam Year 2 (Thai: ยกสยามปี 2) was a Thai quiz show television program. It encouraged Thai people in each province using their ability joyfully about knowledges and being proud in their hometown. It broadcast on Monday - Friday 6:30 - 6:55 p.m. on Modern Nine TV. It had begun airdate on January 12, 2009 before ended on February 25, 2010. It was produced by Workpoint Entertainment.

In addition, Maha Vajiralongkorn, Crown Prince of Thailand gave certificates with his signature to the province that is the winner.

== Rules ==
In each team, there were 10 competitors with different jobs, and header of each team was well-known people in that province. Competitors of each team had to answer the questions about knownledges in Thailand, by choosing two choice, ก (A) or ข (B). Which team reaches three or five scores first, will be the winner.

== Regional qualification ==
=== Eastern qualification ===
Note: red number with x means all competitors of each team answered wrong.

==== Participating teams ====
In the Eastern qualification, there were seven participating province teams, listed below.

Team	Previous best performance
Chonburi Province	First round 3-1 loss together with Phichit
Rayong Province	First round - Group final 3-5 loss to Ang Thong
Sa Kaeo Province	First round 2-4 loss to Krabi
Prachin Buri Province	Fourth round (round-robin tournament); 3-5 loss to Nonthaburi; 4-2 loss together with Ang Thong; 3-4 loss to Chiang Rai; 2-2 loss to Ranong
Chachoengsao Province	First round 2-5 loss to Phetchaburi
Trat Province	First round 1-1 loss to Pathum Thani
Chanthaburi Province	Third round 2-6 loss to Ranong

==== First round ====
In the first round, there were seven provinces. One of them was given a bye to the second round.

Match	Team 1	Score	Team 2
1	Chonburi Province	2x-2x	Rayong Province
2	Sa Kaeo Province	2-3	Prachin Buri Province
3	Chachoengsao Province	2x-3	Trat Province
-	Chanthaburi Province	--->	Draw bye to the 2nd round

==== Second round ====
In the second round, there were three provinces advancing from the first round. They played a round-robin tournament, in which each team is scheduled for two matches against other teams. This means that a total of three matches are played within a round. The top two teams advanced to the final.

Legend
Winner and runner-up advanced to the final

Ranking	Team	Played	Won	Lost	Points
1	Chanthaburi Province	1	1	0	1
1	Trat Province	1	1	0	1
3	Prachin Buri Province	2	0	2	0

Match	Team	Score result	Team
1	Prachin Buri	3x-5	Chanthaburi
2	Prachin Buri	4x-5	Trat
3	Chanthaburi	Bye to the Eastern final	Trat

==== Final ====
Item no.	Chanthaburi Province										Members remaining	Trat Province										Ans
1	ก	ก	ข	ข	ข	ข	ข	ข	ข	ข	10 - 10	ก	ก	ก	ก	ข	ข	ข	ข	ข	ข	ก
2	ก	ข									2 - 4	ก	ก	ก	ข							ก
3	ก										1 - 3	ก	ก	ข								ก
4	ก										1 - 2	ก	ข									ข
-											0 - 1											Trat, the winner

=== Northern qualification ===
Note: red number with x means all competitors of each team answered wrong.

==== Participating teams ====
In the Northern qualification, there were sixteen participating province teams, listed below.

Team	Previous best performance
Phayao Province	First round 2-3 loss to Chumphon
Uttaradit Province	First round 3-4 loss to Loei
Phitsanulok Province	First round 7-7 loss together with Tak
Lampang Province	First round 3-3 loss together with Ubon Ratchathani
Lamphun Province	First round 4-5 loss to Prachuap Khiri Khan
Sukhothai Province	Third round 1-3, 2-3 loss to Chiang Rai
Phetchabun Province	First round - Group final 4-5 loss to Chanthaburi
Mae Hong Son Province	Second round 1-3 loss to Sisaket
Nan Province	First round 0-3 loss to Nonthaburi
Chiang Mai Province	First round 4-5 loss to Nakhon Ratchasima
Nakhon Sawan Province	First round 0-4 loss to Sisaket
Phrae Province	First round 2-3 loss to Nakhon Nayok
Phichit Province	First round 1-3 loss together with Chonburi
Kamphaeng Phet Province	First round - Group final 2-3 loss to Chiang Rai
Tak Province	First round 7-7 loss together with Phitsanulok
Chiang Rai Province	Fourth round 3-5 loss to Nonthaburi; 2-4 loss to Ranong; 3-5 loss to Ang Thong

==== Knockout stage ====
Round of 16
Phayao	1x
Uttaradit	3
Phitsanulok	3
Lampang	2x
Lamphun	4x
Sukhothai	5
Phetchabun	2x
Mae Hong Son	3
Nan	3
Chiang Mai	1x
Nakhon Sawan	3
Phrae	1x
Phichit	1x
Kamphaeng Phet	2
Tak	1x
Chiang Rai	3

Quarter-finals
Uttaradit	2x
Phitsanulok	3
Sukhothai	3
Mae Hong Son	2x
Nan	3
Nakhon Sawan	3x
Kamphaeng Phet	2x
Chiang Rai	3

Semi-finals
Phitsanulok	3x
Sukhothai	5
Nan	4x
Chiang Rai	5

Final
Sukhothai	1 left
Chiang Rai	1 left

=== Southern qualification ===
Note: red number with x means all competitors of each team answered wrong.

==== Participating teams ====
In the Southern qualification, there were fourteen participating province teams, listed below.

Team	Previous best performance
Chumphon Province	Second round 1x-3 loss to Ang Thong
Krabi Province	First round - Group final 4x-5 loss to Phetchaburi
Nakhon Si Thammarat Province	First round 0x-3 loss to Kanchanaburi
Narathiwat Province	First round 2x-4 loss to Rayong
Pattani Province	First round 1x-3 loss to Mukdahan
Phang Nga Province	First round 2-3 loss to Sukhothai
Phatthalung Province	First round 2-3 loss to Mae Hong Son
Phuket Province	First round 2-3 loss to Amnat Charoen
Ranong Province	Winner
Satun Province	First round 1x-2 loss to Kamphaeng Phet
Songkhla Province	First round 4x-5 loss to Yasothon
Surat Thani Province	First round 3-4 loss to Sakon Nakhon
Trang Province	First round 4-5 loss to Chanthaburi
Yala Province	Second round 2-3 loss to Chiang Rai

=== Northeastern qualification ===
Note: red number with x means all competitors of each team answered wrong.

=== Central qualification ===
Note: red number with x means all competitors of each team answered wrong.

== See also ==
- Yok Siam Year 1
