= Bang Pahan district =

Bang Pahan บางปะหัน
- District
- District location in Ayutthaya province
- Coordinates: 14°27′45″N 100°32′41″E
- Country: Thailand
- Province: Ayutthaya
- Seat: Bang Pahan
- Tambon: 17
- Muban: 94

Area
  - Total: 121.9 km^{2} (47.1 sq mi)

Population (2000)
  - Total: 38,799
  - Density: 318.3/km^{2} (824/sq mi)
- Time zone: UTC+7 (ICT)
- Postal code: 13220
- Geocode: 1407

Bang Pahan (Thai: บางปะหัน, pronounced [bāːŋ pā.hǎn]) is one of the 16 districts (amphoe) of Ayutthaya province.

== History ==
The district was originally named Nakhon Luang Nai, but was renamed in 1916 to Bang Pahan as the name of the central tambon.

The Phuan people from Vientiane who migrated around this area in the reign of King Rama II established the settlement. They also built a windmill in their village, thus the village was named Ban Kanghan after the Thai word for windmill (Kanghan, กังหัน). The name was later corrupted by misspellings to Pahan.

== Geography ==
Neighboring districts are (from the north clockwise) Maha Rat, Nakhon Luang, Phra Nakhon Si Ayutthaya and Bang Ban of Ayutthaya province, and Pa Mok of Ang Thong province.

== Administration ==
The district is divided into 17 sub-districts tambon, which are further subdivided into 94 villages muban. The township (thesaban tambon) of Bang Pahan covers tambon Khwan Mueang and parts of the tambon Bang Pahan and Bang Nang Ra.

No.	Name	Thai	Villages
1.	Bang Pahan	บางปะหัน	7
2.	Khayai	ขยาย	6
3.	Bang Duea	บางเดื่อ	6
4.	Sao Thong	เสาธง	5
5.	Thang Klang	ทางกลาง	4
6.	Bang Phloeng	บางเพลิง	3
7.	Hansang	หันสัง	7
8.	Bang Nang Ra	บางนางร้า	5
9.	Ta Nim	ตานิม	4
10.	Thap Nam	ทับน้ำ	5
11.	Ban Ma	บ้านม้า	4
12.	Khwan Mueang	ขวัญเมือง	5
13.	Ban Li	บ้านลี่	5
14.	Pho Sam Ton	โพธิ์สามต้น	8
15.	Phutlao	พุทเลา	12
16.	Tan En	ตาลเอน	3
17.	Ban Khlo	บ้านขล้อ	5
