= San Chao Rong Thong =

Coordinates: 14°35′42.4″N 100°21′15.0″E

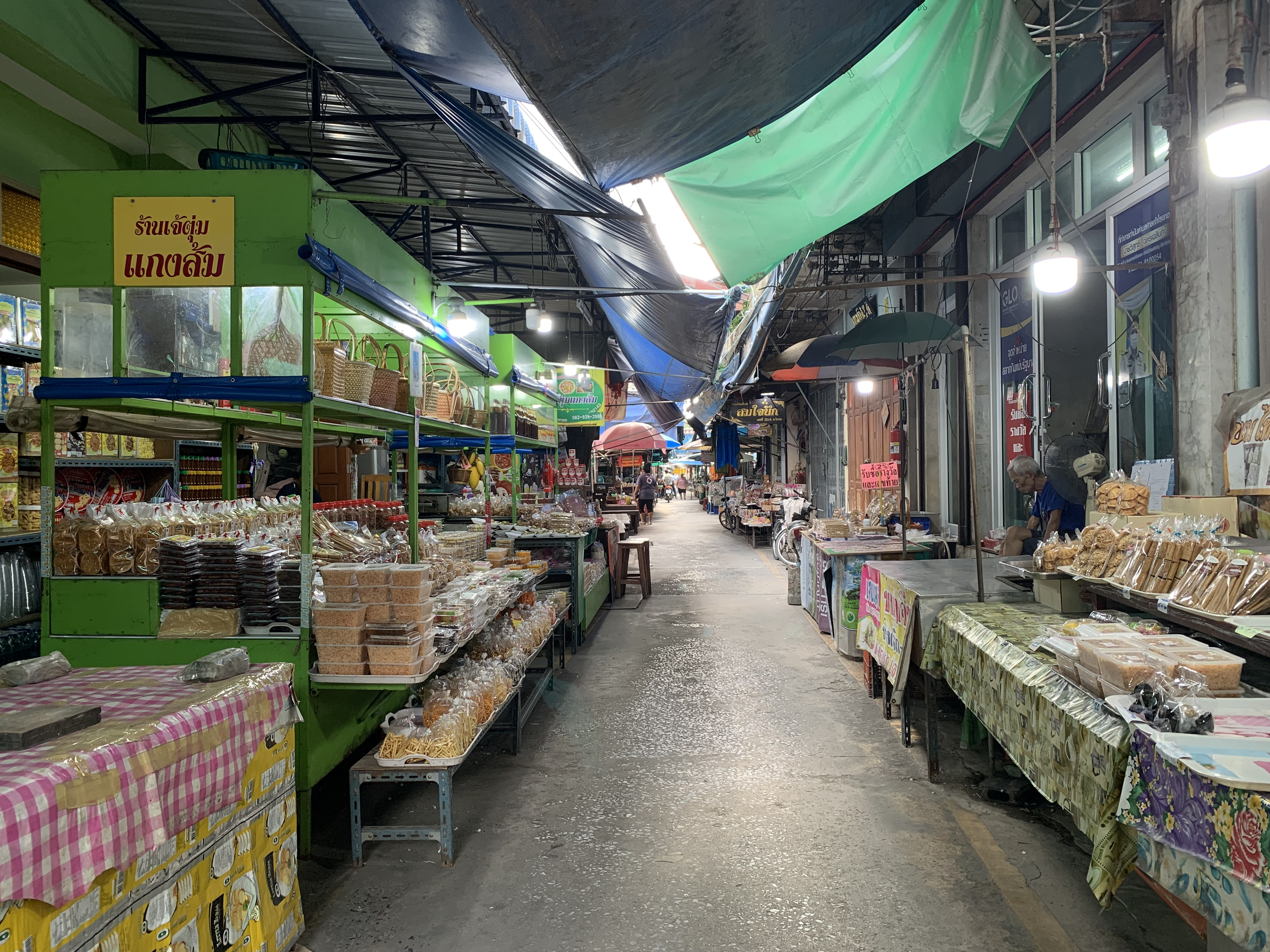
Talat San Chao Rong Thong Market (San Chao Rong Thong Market)

San Chao Rong Thong (Thai: ศาลเจ้าโรงทอง, pronounced [sǎːn t͡ɕâːw rōːŋ tʰɔ̄ːŋ]) is one of 15 tambons (sub-districts) of Wiset Chai Chan District, Ang Thong Province, central Thailand, where most inhabitants are of Chinese descent.

== History & currently ==
The name San Chao Rong Thong, meaning "Gold Station Joss House," comes from the presence of a Guan Yu shrine and many gold-processing factories in the area. In the past, it was called "Ban Phai Cham Sin" (บ้านไผ่จำศีล), but in 1877, it was renamed San Chao Rong Thong after King Rama V officially established Ang Thong Province, which led to an increase in immigration and settlement.

San Chao Rong Thong is a riverside community located along the Noi River. It has long been an important trading district and a main travel route between Bangkok and the northern provinces. In the 1950s and 1960s, local people mostly traveled to Bangkok by water taxi, with up to three service piers in operation. The Noi River and surrounding canals were once teeming with edible fish, including the dangerous puffer fish.

The San Chao Rong Thong Market has existed for over 100 years. It was nearly shut down after a devastating fire broke out in the middle of the night on December 6, 2005. The market is divided into four zones: Talat Nuea (ตลาดเหนือ), Talat Klang (ตลาดกลาง), Talat Tai (ตลาดใต้), and Talat Noi (ตลาดน้อย). Today, the market still retains the character of an old community and the traditional way of life, making it one of Ang Thong's important cultural attractions.

The market is especially famous for its wide variety of traditional Thai sweets, many of which are now considered rare. On Saturdays from 4:00 p.m. to 9:00 p.m., the Talat Noi area transforms into a walking street featuring local products and food for sale.

== Geography ==
The area of San Chao Rong Thong is a lowland without forests, mountains, An irrigation canal flows through every mubans (villages), providing water for agriculture.

Neighboring tambons are (from the north clockwise): Muang Tia, Phai Cham Sin, Tha Chang and Yi Lon.

Noi River is a main watercourse and Highway 3195 is a main road.

San Chao Rong Thong is about 10 km (6 mi) from downtown Wiset Chai Chan.

== Administration ==
=== Central administration ===
San Chao Rong Thong subdivided into 10 administrative villages

| No. | Name | Thai |
|---|---|---|
| 1. | Ban Khok Wau Yai | บ้านคอกวัวใหญ่ |
| 2. | Ban Khlong Nam Chiao | บ้านคลองน้ำเชี่ยว |
| 3. | Ban Hua Ro | บ้านหัวรอ |
| 4. | Ban Na Wat Luang | บ้านหน้าวัดหลวง |
| 5. | Ban Na Wat Nang Nai | บ้านหน้าวัดนางใน |
| 6. | Ban Kong Chang | บ้านกองช้าง |
| 7. | Ban Na Wat Sing | บ้านหน้าวัดสิงห์ |
| 8. | Ban Khwang | บ้านขวาง |
| 9. | Ban Na Wat Kamphaeng | บ้านหน้าวัดกำแพง |
| 10. | Ban Pho Khiao | บ้านโพธิ์เขียว |

=== Local administration ===
San Chao Rong Thong is administered by the Subdistrict Administrative Organization (SAO) San Chao Rong Thong (องค์การบริหารส่วนตำบลศาลเจ้าโรงทอง).

Moreover, it is also divided into five communities.

== Places ==
- Wat Kien, an ancient temple with mural paintings is about 400 years old
- Wat Nang Nai Thammikaram, a temple at one time, the magic monk, Luang Phor Num, used to be an abbot
- San Chao Rong Thong Market, also known as Wiset Chai Chan Market

== Local products ==
- Thai sweets
- Benjarong (five colours) ceramic products

== Notable people ==
- Jermsak Pinthong, independent economist, political commentator, TV host
- Kengkat Jongjaiphra, actor, country singer, astrologer
