= Yok Siam Year 1 =

Thai television quiz show

Yok Siam Year 1 (Thai: ยกสยามปี 1) is a Thai quiz show television program. It encouraged Thai people in each province using their ability joyfully about knowledges and being proud in their hometown. It broadcast on Monday – Friday 6:30 – 6:55 p.m. on Modern Nine TV. It had begun airdate on February 18, 2008, before ended on January 9, 2009. It was produced by Workpoint Entertainment.

In addition, Maha Vajiralongkorn, Crown Prince of Thailand gave certificates with his signature to the province that is the winner.

After Yok Siam Year 1 had ended airdate, Yok Siam Year 2 began airdate.

== First round ==
In the first round, there were 76 provinces. (Note: in that year, Bueng Kan hasn't been established yet.) Teams are divided into 19 groups, four provinces per one group. In each group, there were two matches. (two provinces per one match) In each team, there were 10 competitors with different jobs, and header of each team was well-known people in that province.

Competitors of each team had to answer the questions about knownledges in Thailand, by choosing two choice, ก (A) or ข (B). Which team reached three or five scores first, was the winner, and the winner would meet another winner team in the group final. Which team won, was the Winner of the group, advanced to the Second round.

Note: red number means all competitors of each team answered wrong.

=== Seeding ===
Teams are divided into 19 groups, four provinces per one group.

Group 1	Group 2	Group 3	Group 4
Prachin Buri province (Winner); Khon Kaen province; Phitsanulok province; Tak province	Nakhon Sawan province; Sisaket province (Winner); Sing Buri province; Ratchaburi province	Songkhla province; Yasothon province (Winner); Nakhon Pathom province; Suphanburi province	Chiang Mai province; Nakhon Ratchasima province (Winner); Surin province; Samut Songkhram province
Group 5	Group 6	Group 7	Group 8
Sa Kaeo province; Krabi province; Chachoengsao province; Phetchaburi province (Winner)	Maha Sarakham province; Ang Thong province (Winner); Narathiwat province; Rayong province	Chaiyaphum province; Phetchabun province; Chanthaburi province (Winner); Trang province	Chonburi province; Phichit province; Nong Khai province (Winner); Phra Nakhon Si Ayutthaya province
Group 9	Group 10	Group 11	Group 12
Chiang Rai province (Winner); Roi Et province; Satun province; Kamphaeng Phet province	Lamphun province; Prachuap Khiri Khan province (Winner); Loei province; Uttaradit province	Kanchanaburi province (Winner); Nakhon Si Thammarat province; Trat province; Pathum Thani province	Nonthaburi province; Nan province; Nakhon Phanom province; Chai Nat province
Group 13	Group 14	Group 15	Group 16
Saraburi province; Yala province (Winner); Sakon Nakhon province; Surat Thani province	Mukdahan province; Pattani province; Samut Prakan province (Winner); Kalasin province	Sukhothai province (Winner); Phang Nga; Ubon Ratchathani province; Lampang province	Phrae province; Nakhon Nayok province; Samut Sakhon province; Udon Thani province
Group 17	Group 18	Group 19	
Phatthalung province; Mae Hong Son province (Winner); Buriram province; Uthai Thani province	Amnat Charoen province; Phuket province; Ranong province (Winner); Nong Bua Lamphu province	Phayao province; Chumphon province (Winner); Bangkok; Lopburi province	

=== Group 1 ===
Phase 1
Prachinburi	6
Khon Kaen	5
Phitsanulok	7
Tak	7

Phase 2 (Group final)
Prachinburi	Bye
n/a	n/a

=== Group 2 ===
Phase 1
Nakhon Sawan	0
Sisaket	4
Sing Buri	5
Ratchaburi	4

Phase 2 (Group final)
Sisaket	5
Sing Buri	4

=== Group 3 ===
Phase 1
Songkhla	4
Yasothon	5
Nakhon Pathom	3
Suphanburi	5

Phase 2 (Group final)
Yasothon	6
Suphanburi	5

=== Group 4 ===
Phase 1
Chiang Mai	4
Nakhon Ratchasima	5
Surin	4
Samut Songkhram	5

Phase 2 (Group final)
Nakhon Ratchasima	5
Samut Songkhram	3

=== Group 5 ===
Phase 1
Sa Kaeo	2
Krabi	4
Chachoengsao	2
Phetchaburi	5

Phase 2 (Group final)
Krabi	4
Phetchaburi	5

=== Group 6 ===
Phase 1
Maha Sarakham	5
Ang Thong	6
Narathiwat	2
Rayong	4

Phase 2 (Group final)
Ang Thong	5
Rayong	3

=== Group 7 ===
Phase 1
Chaiyaphum	4
Phetchabun	5
Chanthaburi	5
Trang	4

Phase 2 (Group final)
Phetchabun	4
Chanthaburi	5

=== Group 8 ===
Phase 1
Chonburi	3
Phichit	1
Nong Khai	4
Phra Nakhon Si Ayutthaya	2

Phase 2 (Group final)
N/A	N/A
Nong Khai	Bye

=== Group 9 ===
Phase 1
Chiang Rai	6
Roi Et	5
Satun	1
Kamphaeng Phet	2

Phase 2 (Group final)
Chiang Rai	3
Kamphaeng Phet	2

=== Group 10 ===
Phase 1
Lamphun	4
Prachuap Khiri Khan	5
Loei	4
Uttaradit	3

Phase 2 (Group final)
Prachuap Khiri Khan	2
Loei	1

=== Group 11 ===
Phase 1
Kanchanaburi	3
Nakhon Si Thammarat	0
Trat	1
Pathum Thani	1

Phase 2 (Group final)
Kanchanaburi	4
Pathum Thani	3

=== Group 12 ===
Phase 1
Nonthaburi	3
Nan	0
Nakhon Phanom	2
Chai Nat	3

Phase 2 (Group final)
Nonthaburi	3
Chai Nat	2

=== Group 13 ===
Phase 1
Saraburi	4
Yala	5
Sakon Nakhon	4
Surat Thani	3

Phase 2 (Group final)
Yala	2
Sakon Nakhon	1

=== Group 14 ===
Phase 1
Mukdahan	3
Pattani	1
Samut Prakan	3
Kalasin	0

Phase 2 (Group final)
Mukdahan	2
Samut Prakan	3

=== Group 15 ===
Phase 1
Sukhothai	3
Phang Nga	2
Ubon Ratchathani	3
Lampang	3

Phase 2 (Group final)
Sukhothai	Bye
N/A	N/A

=== Group 16 ===
Phase 1
Phrae	2
Nakhon Nayok	3
Samut Sakhon	4
Udon Thani	3

Phase 2 (Group final)
Nakhon Nayok	3
Samut Sakhon	3

- Note: Group 16 had no winner of the group.

=== Group 17 ===
Phase 1
Phatthalung	2
Mae Hong Son	3
Buriram	1
Uthai Thani	3

Phase 2 (Group final)
Mae Hong Son	2
Uthai Thani	1

=== Group 18 ===
Phase 1
Amnat Charoen	3
Phuket	2
Ranong	3
Nong Bua Lamphu	2

Phase 2 (Group final)
Amnat Charoen	5
Ranong	6

=== Group 19 ===
Phase 1
Phayao	2
Chumphon	3
Bangkok	4
Lopburi	4

Phase 2 (Group final)
Chumphon	Bye
N/A	N/A

== Second round ==
In the second round, there were 18 provinces advancing from the first round. (except group 16 without winner) Which team reached three scores first, was the winner, and advanced to the Third round.

=== Seeding ===
Teams were seeded into two pots – Pot 1 and Pot 2.

Pot 1	Pot 2
Chanthaburi province (group 7); Chiang Rai province (group 9); Sukhothai province (group 15); Ang Thong province (group 6); Sisaket province (group 2); Prachin Buri province (group 1); Samut Prakan province (group 14); Kanchanaburi province (group 11); Prachuap Khiri Khan province (group 10)	Nong Khai province (group 8); Yala province (group 13); Nonthaburi province (group 12); Chumphon province (group 19); Mae Hong Son province (group 17); Yasothon province (group 3); Phetchaburi province (group 5); Nakhon Ratchasima province (group 4); Ranong province (group 18)

=== Matches ===
Note: red number with x means all competitors of each team answered wrong.

Match	Team 1	Score	Team 2
1	Chanthaburi province (King of Chanthabun)	6-6 (Note: While Chanthaburi 5-5 Nong Khai, moderator ask a question: Which one is a wrong action in the public and have to be fined 100 baht, (ก) Spitting, (ข) Shouting profanity. All competitors of Chanthaburi answered ข, and all of Nong Khai answered ก. Moderator said that ก. was the correct choice, making Nong Khai won and advanced to 3rd round. But in the next break, the moderator called the header of two provinces and said that both ก and ข were correct choices, and proclaimed Chanthaburi and Nong Khai advanced to 3rd round.)	Nong Khai province (Nakha Khanong Khong)
2	Chiang Rai province (Tung Ala Wat)	3-2	Yala province (Phayak Yang Raeng)
3	Sukhothai province (Phra Ruang Knight)	5-5 (Note: While Sukhothai 4-4 Nonthaburi, moderator changed the rule, if all competitors of two provinces answer right, both two provinces will won and advanced to 3 rd round. All competitors of two provinces answered right, making Sukhothai and Nonthaburi advanced to 3rd round.)	Nonthaburi province (Kan Yao Phayong)
4	Ang Thong province (Golden Rice Killer)	3-1x	Chumphon province (South Gateway Warrior)
5	Sisaket province (Det Lamduan)	3-1x	Mae Hong Son (Three Fog Warrior)
6	Prachin Buri province (Brave Bamboo)	3-2x	Yasothon province (Bang Fai Pha-ngat)
7	Samut Prakan province (Khot Ai Khium)	2-3	Phetchaburi province (Sweet Eye Killer)
8	Kanchanaburi province (Mueang Song Kwae)	2x-2x	Nakhon Ratchasima province (Koracha Warrior)
9	Prachuap Khiri Khan province (Khao Sam Roi Yod)	0x-3	Ranong province (Chao Bun Tay)

== Third round ==
In the third round, there were ten provinces advancing from the second round. Which team reached 2 in 3 sets first, be the winner and advance to the fourth round.

=== Matches ===
Note: red number with x means all competitors of each team answered wrong.

Match	Team 1	Set 1	Set 2	Play-off	Team 2
1	Prachin Buri province	3-1	3-1x	-	Nong Khai province
2	Sisaket province	2-3	2-3	-	Nonthaburi province
3	Ranong province	3-1	3-1	-	Chanthaburi province
4	Chiang Rai province	3-1	0-3	3-2x	Sukhothai province
5	Ang Thong province	3-2	2-1x	-	Phetchaburi province

== Fourth round ==
In the fourth round, there were five provinces advancing from the third round. They played a round-robin tournament, in which each team is scheduled for four matches against other teams. This means that a total of ten matches are played within a round. The top two teams advanced to the final.

=== Standings ===
Legend
Winner and runner-up advanced to the final

Ranking	Team	Played	Won	Lost	Points
1	Ranong province	4	4	0	4
2	Nonthaburi province	4	3	1	3
3	Ang Thong province	4	1	3	1
	Chiang Rai province	4	1	3	1
5	Prachin Buri province	4	0	4	0

=== Matches ===
Note: red number with x means all competitors of each team answered wrong.

Match	Team 1	Score	Team 2
1	Prachin Buri	3x-5	Nonthaburi
2	Ranong	5-2x	Ang Thong
3	Chiang Rai	3-5	Nonthaburi
4	Ranong	4-2x	Chiang Rai
5	Prachin Buri	4x-2x	Ang Thong
6	Chiang Rai	4-3x	Prachin Buri
7	Nonthaburi	4-5	Ranong
8	Ranong	2-2x	Prachin Buri
9	Ang Thong	5-3	Chiang Rai
10	Ang Thong	3-5	Nonthaburi

== Final ==
The final was divided into three set: set 1, set 2 (one point each set), and set 3 (two points each set). Which team has more points, will be the winner.

Team 1	Point	Team 2
Ranong	4-0	Nonthaburi

== Winner and runner-up ==
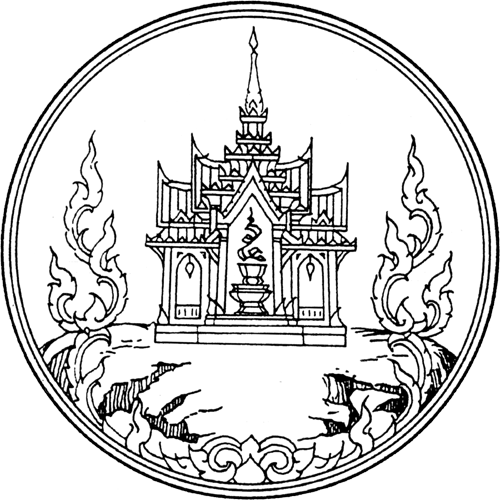
Ranong province winner

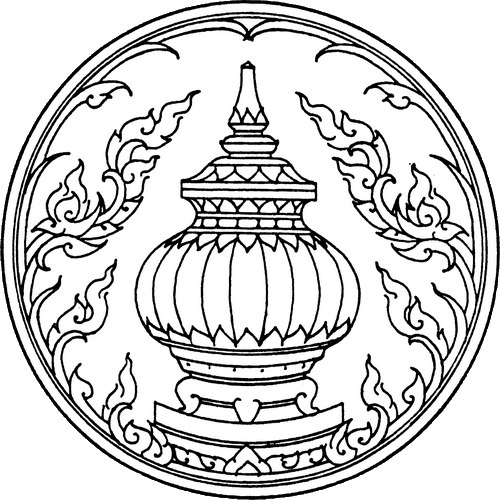
Nonthaburi province runner-up

== Special airdates ==
=== Yok Siam Trivia ===
The Yok Siam trivia special airdates took place before the final match between Ranong and Nonthaburi. There were 11 episodes.

No.	Airdate	Trivia about
1	November 12, 2008	Galyani Vadhana, the Princess of Naradhiwas
2	November 13, 2008	How is the name from?
3	November 18, 2008	Galyani Vadhana's books
4	November 19, 2008	Galyani Vadhana's egg dishes
5	November 20, 2008	Klai Puen Thiang, Chue Siang, Tee Tra Chong
6	November 21, 2008	Hell and heaven
7	November 24, 2008	Thai beliefs
8	November 25, 2008	What is black bean from?
9	November 26, 2008	Pig
10	November 27, 2008	10 Quizs – I
11	November 28, 2008	10 Quizs – II

== See also ==
- Yok Siam Year 2
