= Ban Phraek district =

Ban Phraek บ้านแพรก
- Amphoe
- Amphoe location in Ayutthaya province
- Coordinates: 14°38′52″N 100°34′57″E
- Country: Thailand
- Province: Ayutthaya
- Seat: Ban Phraek
- Tambon: 5

Area
  - Total: 39.1 km^{2} (15.1 sq mi)

Population (2005)
  - Total: 9,250
  - Density: 236.6/km^{2} (613/sq mi)
- Time zone: UTC+7 (ICT)
- Postal code: 13240
- Geocode: 1416

Ban Phraek (Thai: บ้านแพรก, pronounced [bâːn pʰrɛ̂ːk]) is one of the 16 districts of Ayutthaya province.

== History ==
Tambon Phraek was separated from Maha Rat district to become a minor district (king amphoe) in 1937. It was upgraded to a full district on 10 December 1959.

== Geography ==
Neighboring districts are (from the north clockwise) Mueang Lopburi of Lopburi province, Don Phut of Saraburi province, Maha Rat of Ayutthaya Province, and Chaiyo of Ang Thong province.

== Administration ==
The district is divided into five sub-districts (tambon), which are further subdivided into 27 villages (muban). Ban Phraek has township (thesaban tambon) status and covers parts of tambon Ban Phraek and Sam Phaniang. There are two tambon administrative organizations (TAO).

Nr.	Name	Thai name	Villages	Pop.
1.	Ban Phraek	บ้านแพรก	5	2,301
2.	Ban Mai	บ้านใหม่	5	1,624
3.	Sam Phaniang	สำพะเนียง	6	2,477
4.	Khlong Noi	คลองน้อย	6	1,383
5.	Song Hong	สองห้อง	5	1,465
