= Maha Rat district =

Maha Rat มหาราช
- District
- District location in Ayutthaya province
- Coordinates: 14°32′3″N 100°31′37″E
- Country: Thailand
- Province: Ayutthaya
- Seat: Hua Phai
- Tambon: 12
- Muban: 58

Area
  - Total: 120.156 km^{2} (46.392 sq mi)

Population (2010)
  - Total: 23,525
  - Density: 193.9/km^{2} (502/sq mi)
- Time zone: UTC+7 (ICT)
- Postal code: 13150
- Geocode: 1415

Maha Rat (Thai: มหาราช, pronounced [māhǎː râːt]) is a district (amphoe) in the northern part of Ayutthaya province in Thailand.

== History ==
Originally the district was named Khwaeng Nakhon Yai. It was converted to an amphoe in 1914 and changed its name to Maha Rat in 1917.

== Geography ==
Neighboring districts are (from the north clockwise) Ban Phraek of Ayutthaya Province, Don Phut of Saraburi province, Bang Pahan of Ayutthaya Province, and Pa Mok, Mueang Ang Thong, and Chaiyo of Ang Thong province.

== Administration ==
The district is divided into 12 sub-districts tambon, which are further subdivided into 58 villages muban. There are two sub-district municipalities (thesaban tambon). Maha Rat covers the whole tambon Hua Phai and Maha Rat. Rong Chang covers the whole tambon Nam Tao, Rong Chang, Chao Pluk, and Phit Phian. There are a further five tambon administrative organizations.

No.	Name	Thai	Villages	Pop.
1.	Hua Phai	หัวไผ่	6	2,156
2.	Kathum	กะทุ่ม	5	1,272
3.	Maha Rat	มหาราช	4	1,317
4.	Nam Tao	น้ำเต้า	4	1,295
5.	Bang Na	บางนา	5	1,973
6.	Rong Chang	โรงช้าง	4	1,820
7.	Chao Pluk	เจ้าปลุก	5	1,571
8.	Phit Phian	พิตเพียน	7	1,874
9.	Ban Na	บ้านนา	6	4,053
10.	Ban Khwang	บ้านขวาง	4	2,052
11.	Tha To	ท่าตอ	4	2,084
12.	Ban Mai	บ้านใหม่	4	2,058
