= Wat Siroi =

Buddhist temple in Ang Thong province, Thailand

Coordinates: 14.554175°N 100.364317°E

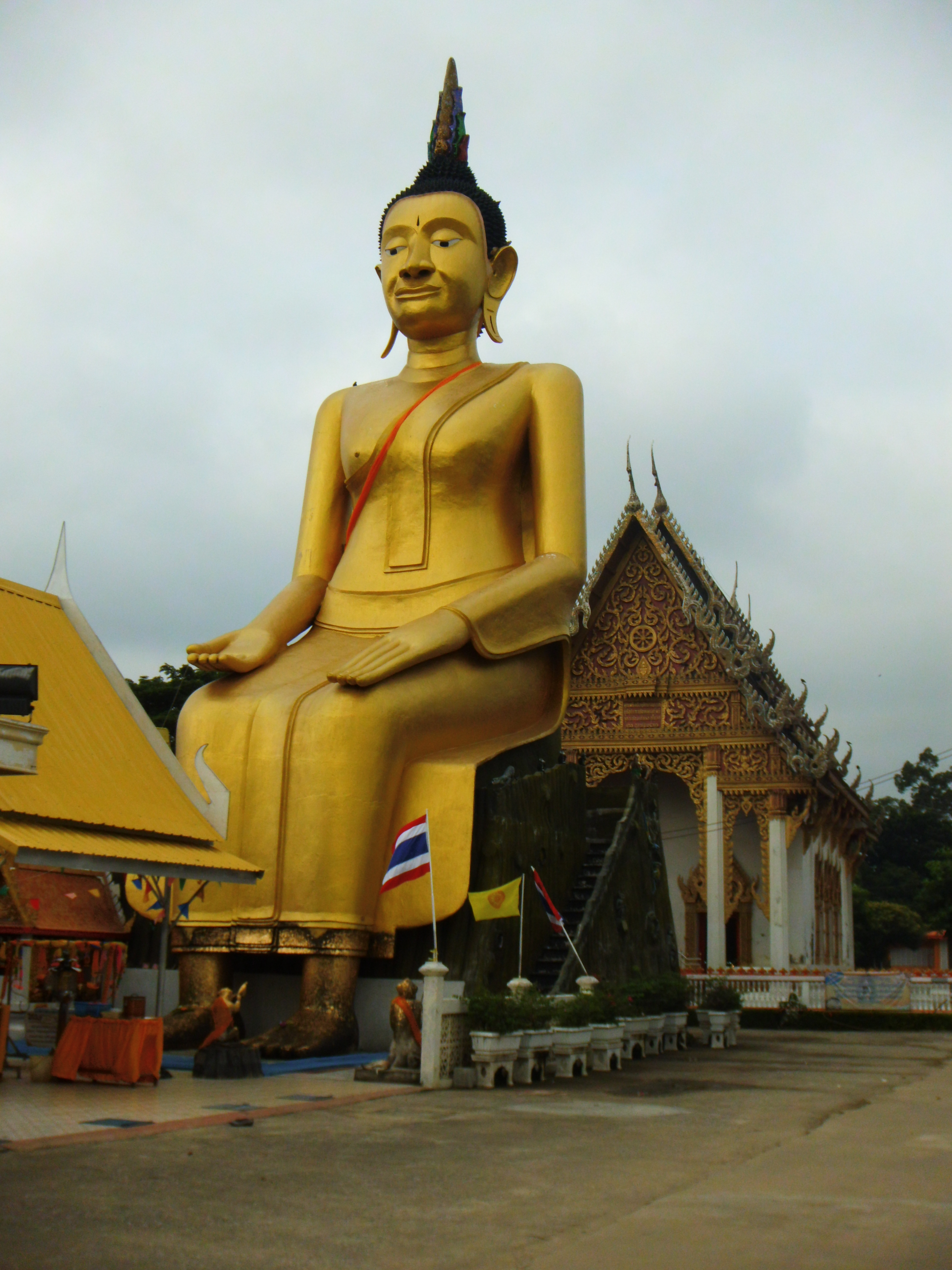
Luang Pho To

Wat Siroi (Thai: วัดสี่ร้อย, pronounced [wát sìː rɔ́ːj]) is an old Buddhist temple in Wiset Chai Chan district, Ang Thong province, Thailand.

The temple is located near the Noi River, a minor tributary of the Chao Phraya River. Its name means "four hundred". It was named to honor Ayutthayan nobleman Khun Rong Palat Chu and the 400 Wiset Chai Chan locals who sacrificed their lives during the battle with Burmese army at Ao Wa Khao (modern day part of Ao Noi, Prachuap Khiri Khan) in 1760. They all died, and their deeds are compared to the Battle of Thermopylae.

The principle Buddha statue called Luang Pho To. Luang Pho To is a large Buddha statue in the Pa Lelai posture, 21 m (68.9 ft) high and 6 m (19.7 ft) wide, enshrined in the open air. Somebody called him as Luang Pho Rong Hai or crying Buddha statue because it was said that somebody saw blood-like fluid dropped from his nose in 1987.
