= Chaiyo district =

Chaiyo ไชโย
- District
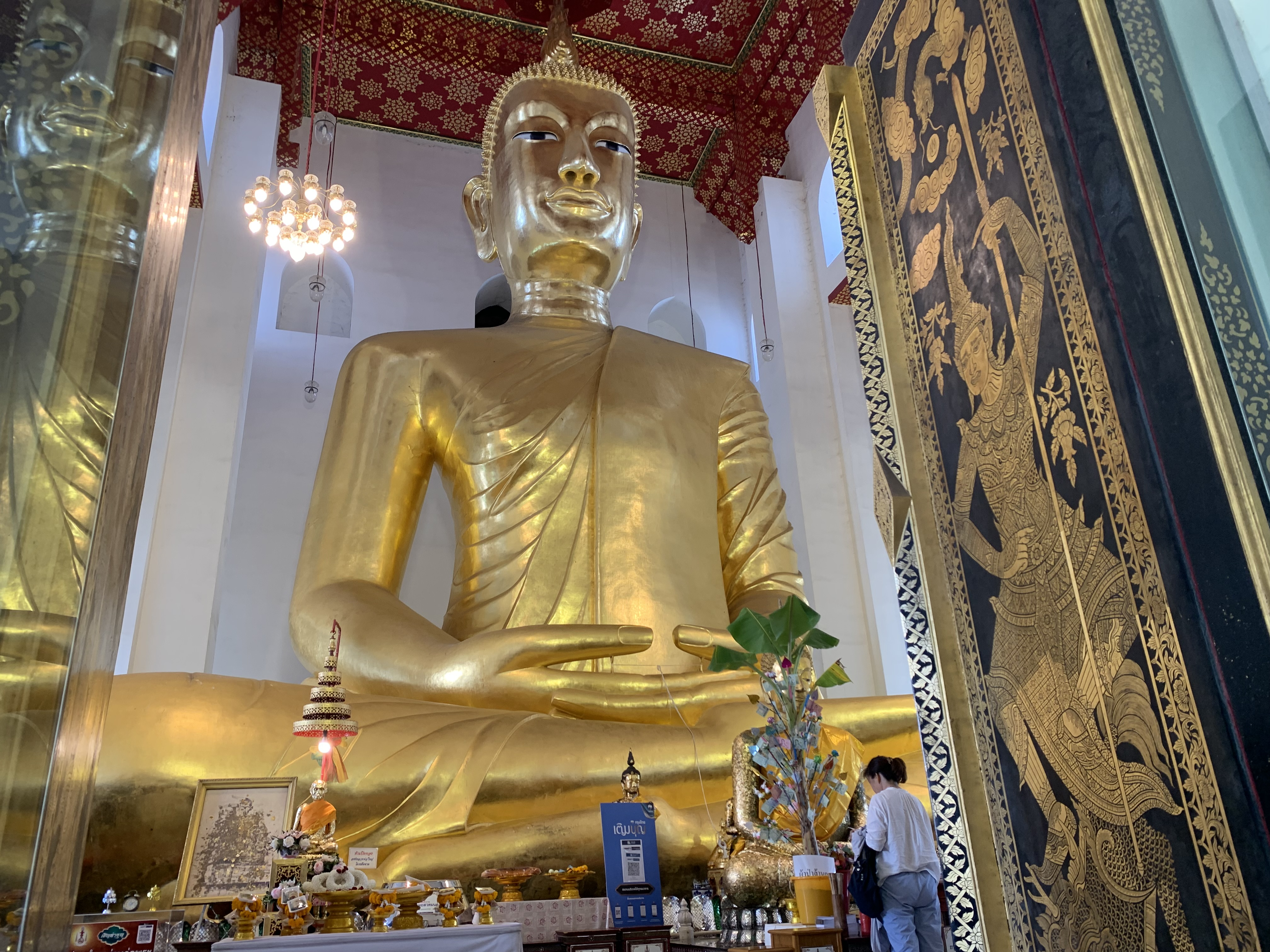
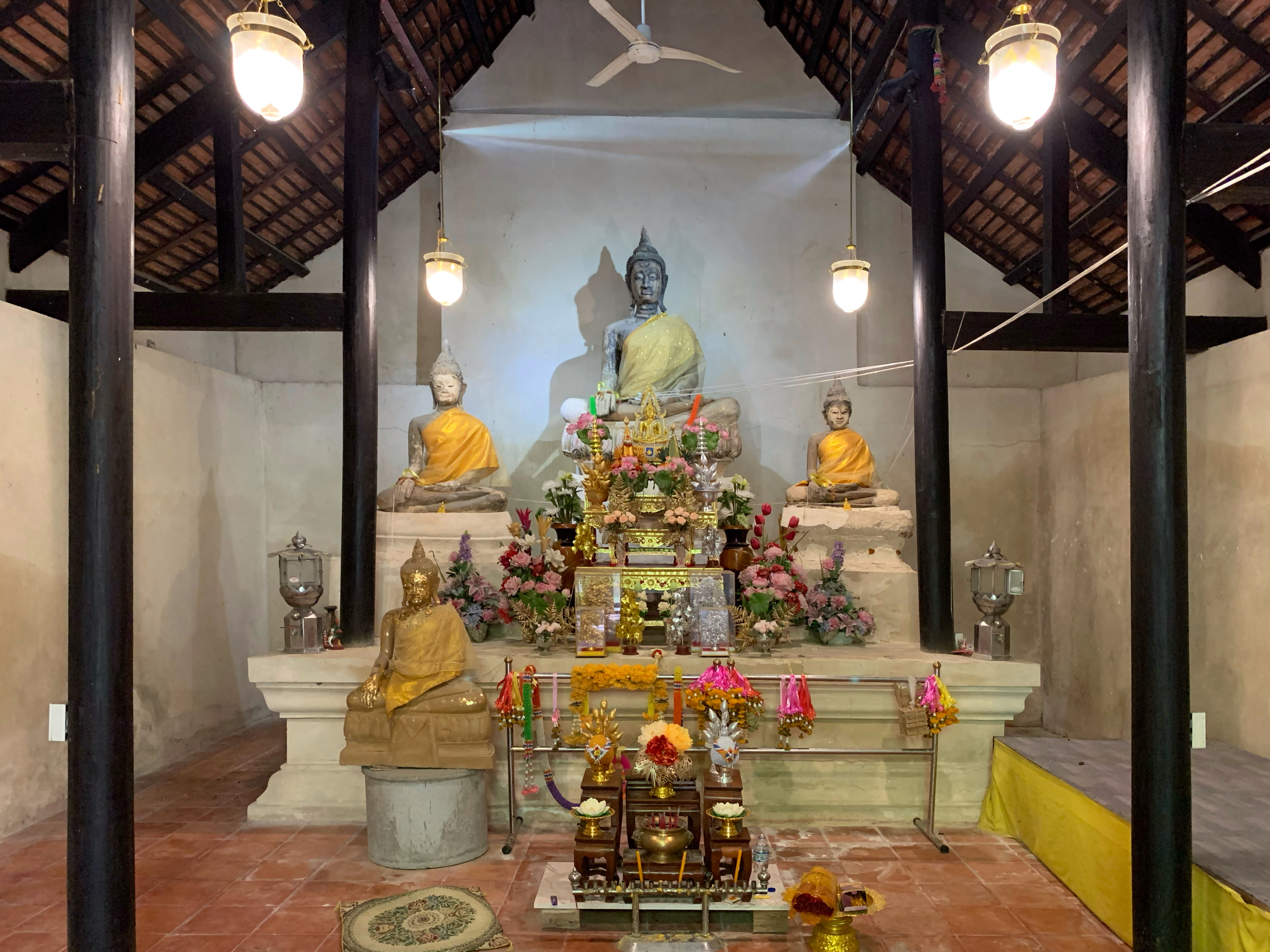
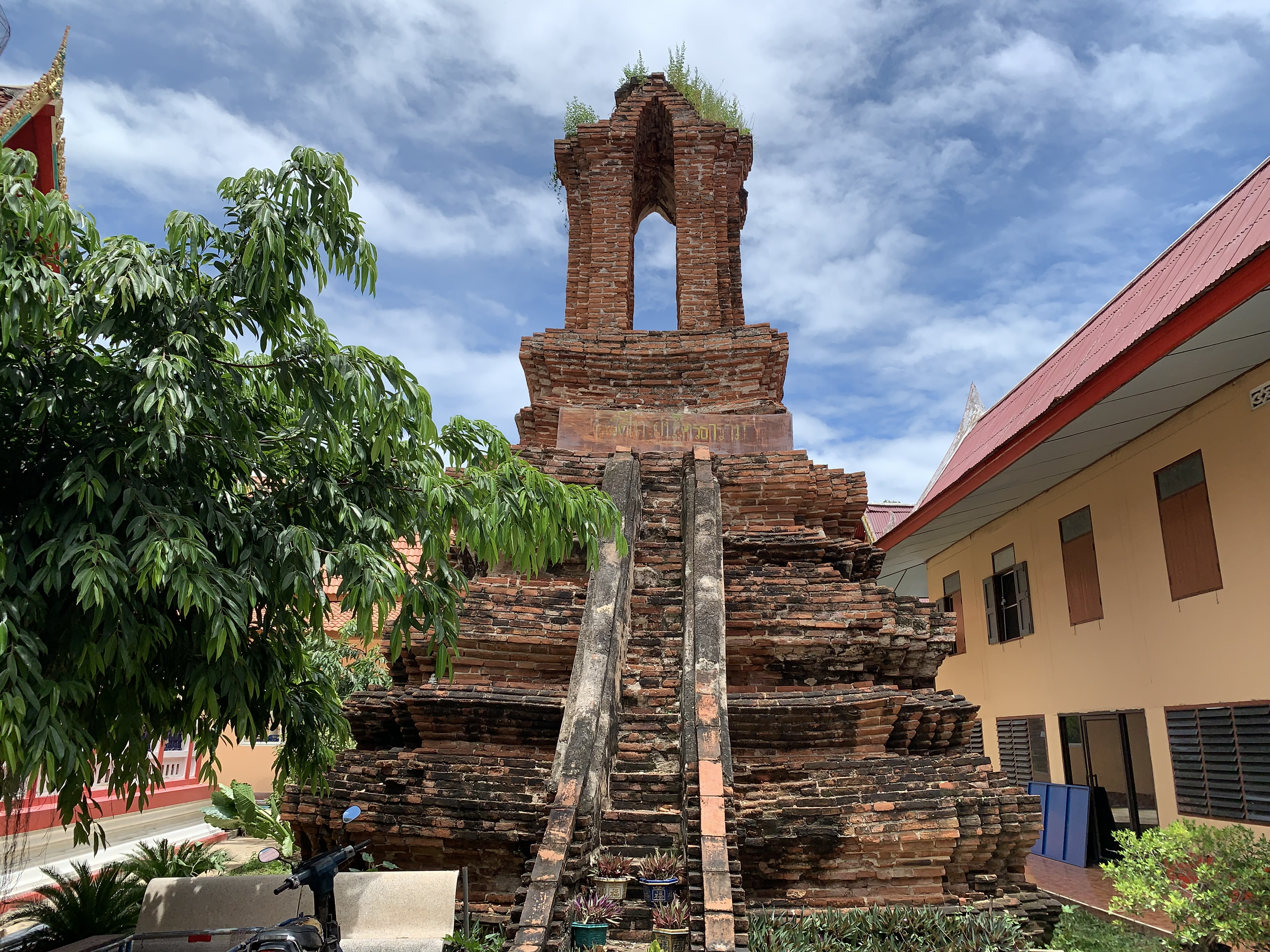
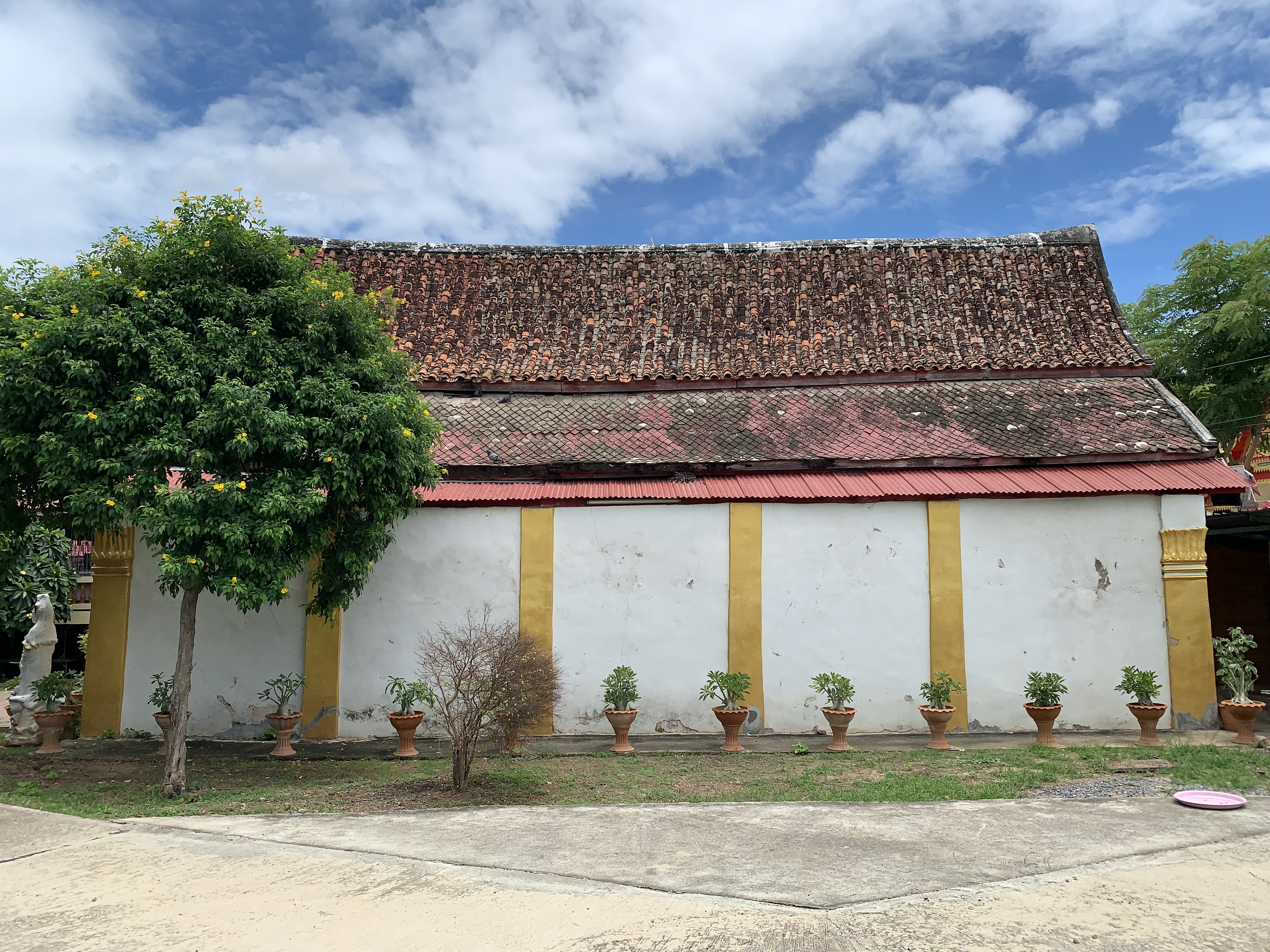
- Big Buddha of Wat Chaiyo Worawihan Wat Ban Pa, Chaiyo Wat Sai Nikhotharam Wat Kamphaeng, Chaiyo

- District location in Ang Thong province
- Coordinates: 14°38′57″N 100°28′43″E
- Country: Thailand
- Province: Ang Thong

Area
  - Total: 72.3 km^{2} (27.9 sq mi)

Population (2005)
  - Total: 22,882
  - Density: 316/km^{2} (820/sq mi)
- Time zone: UTC+7 (ICT)
- Postal code: 14140
- Geocode: 1502

Chaiyo (Thai: ไชโย, pronounced [t͡ɕʰāj.jōː]) is a district (amphoe) in the eastern part of Ang Thong province in Thailand.

== History ==
The name Ban Chaiyo dates back to when King Naresuan the Great and his brother, who later became King Ekathotsarot, defeated the King of Lan Na and Burmese soldiers in this area. The soldiers of Ayutthaya shouted Chaiyo (ไชโย, "hurrah") to celebrate. It is unclear whether the name Chaiyo was given to the area (as Ban Chaiyo; Chaiyo village) or the prominent Buddhist temple Wat Chaiyo first, and which was subsequently named after which.

In the past, Chaiyo was called Ban Makham. When it was officially promoted to a district, the government selected the name "Chaiyo" because of its storied past.

== Geography ==
Neighbouring districts are (from the north clockwise): Phrom Buri of Sing Buri province, Tha Wung, and Mueang Lopburi of Lopburi province; Ban Phraek and Maha Rat of Ayutthaya province; and Mueang Ang Thong and Pho Thong of Ang Thong Province.

== Administration ==
The district is divided into nine sub-districts (tambons), which are further subdivided into 56 villages (mubans). There are two townships (thesaban tambons) in the district. Chorakhe Rong covers tambons Chorakhe Rong, Chaiyaphum, Lak Fa, Chawai, Tri Narong, and parts of Chaiyarit. Tambon Chaiyo is completely covered by the township Ket Chaiyo..

No.	Name	Thai name	Villages	Pop.
1.	Chorakhe Rong	จรเข้ร้อง	7	3,032
2.	Chaiyaphum	ไชยภูมิ	8	3,476
3.	Chaiyarit	ชัยฤทธิ์	6	3,178
4.	Thewarat	เทวราช	7	2,028
5.	Ratchasathit	ราชสถิตย์	7	2,288
6.	Chaiyo	ไชโย	7	2,848
7.	Lak Fa	หลักฟ้า	3	1,553
8.	Chawai	ชะไว	3	2,989
9.	Tri Narong	ตรีณรงค์	8	1,490
