= Mueang Ang Thong district =

Mueang Ang Thong เมืองอ่างทอง
- District
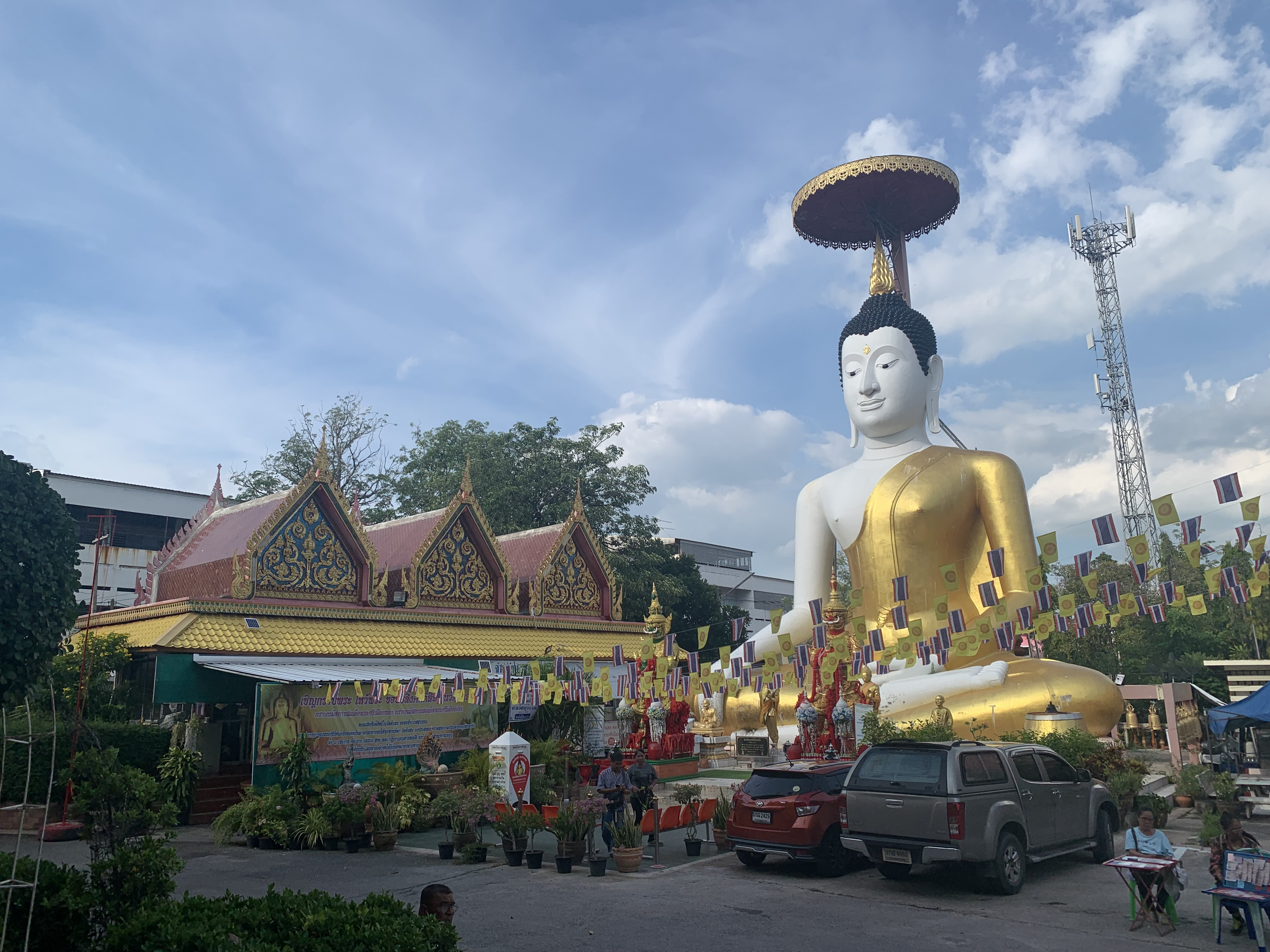
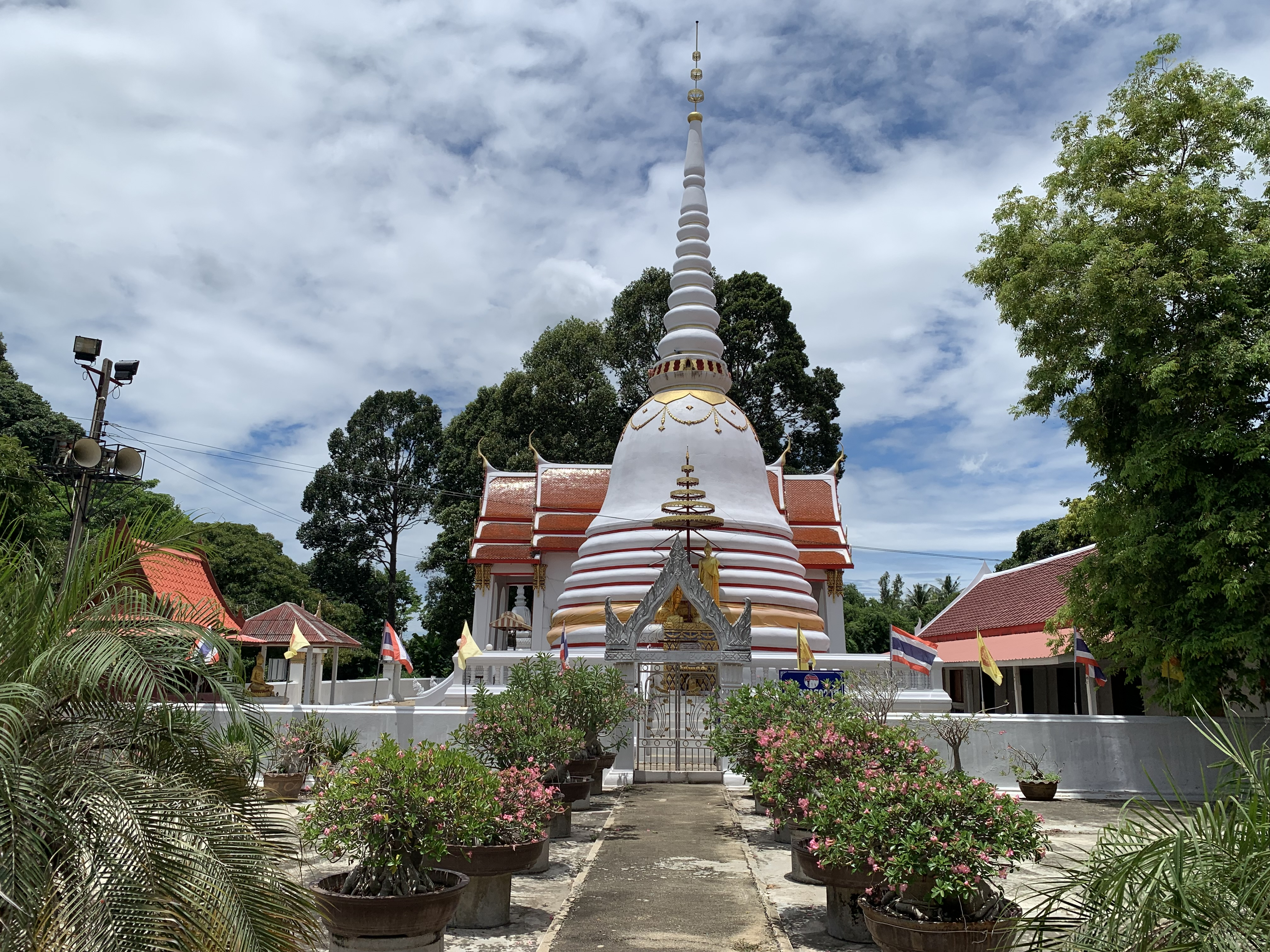
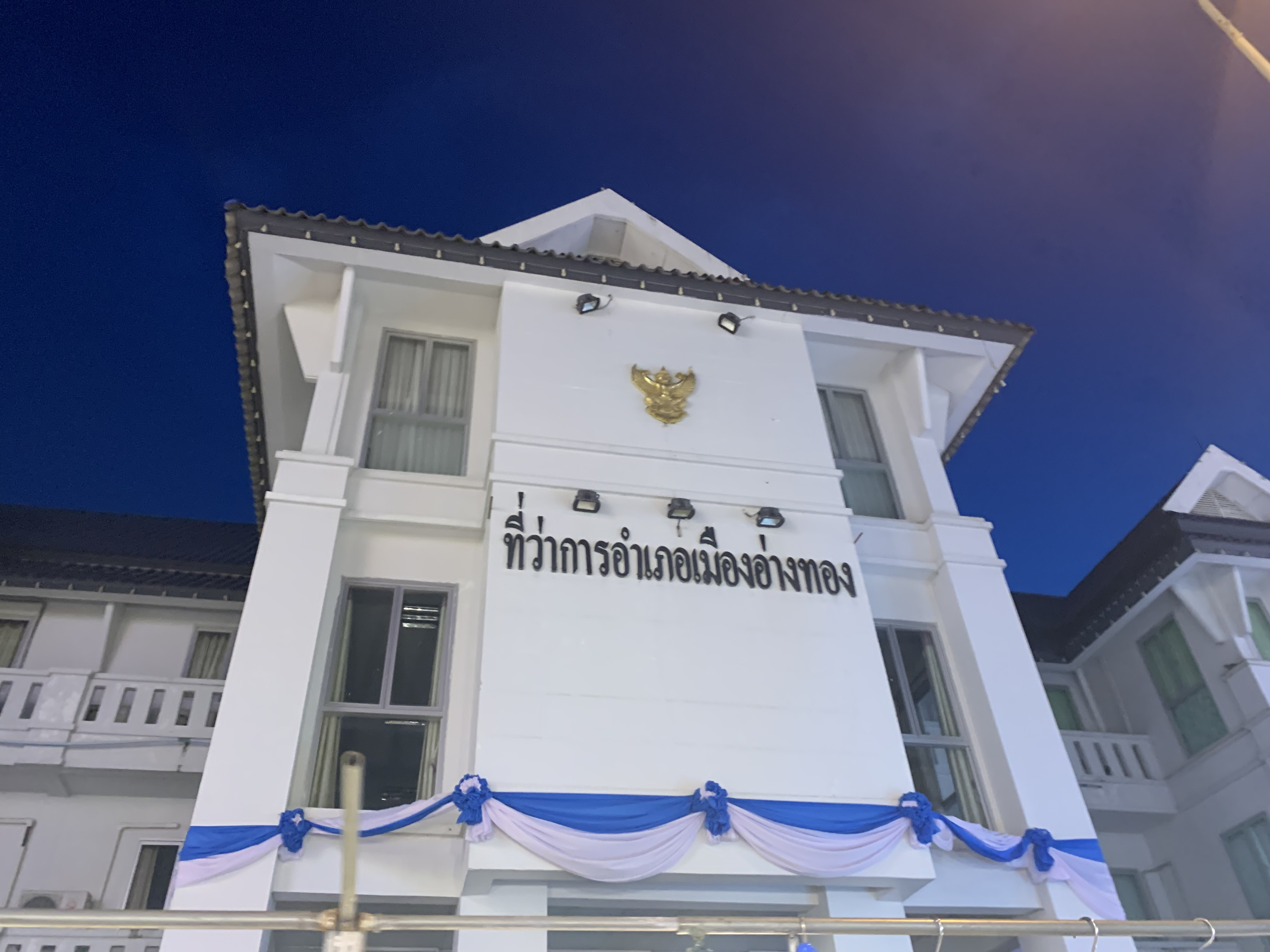
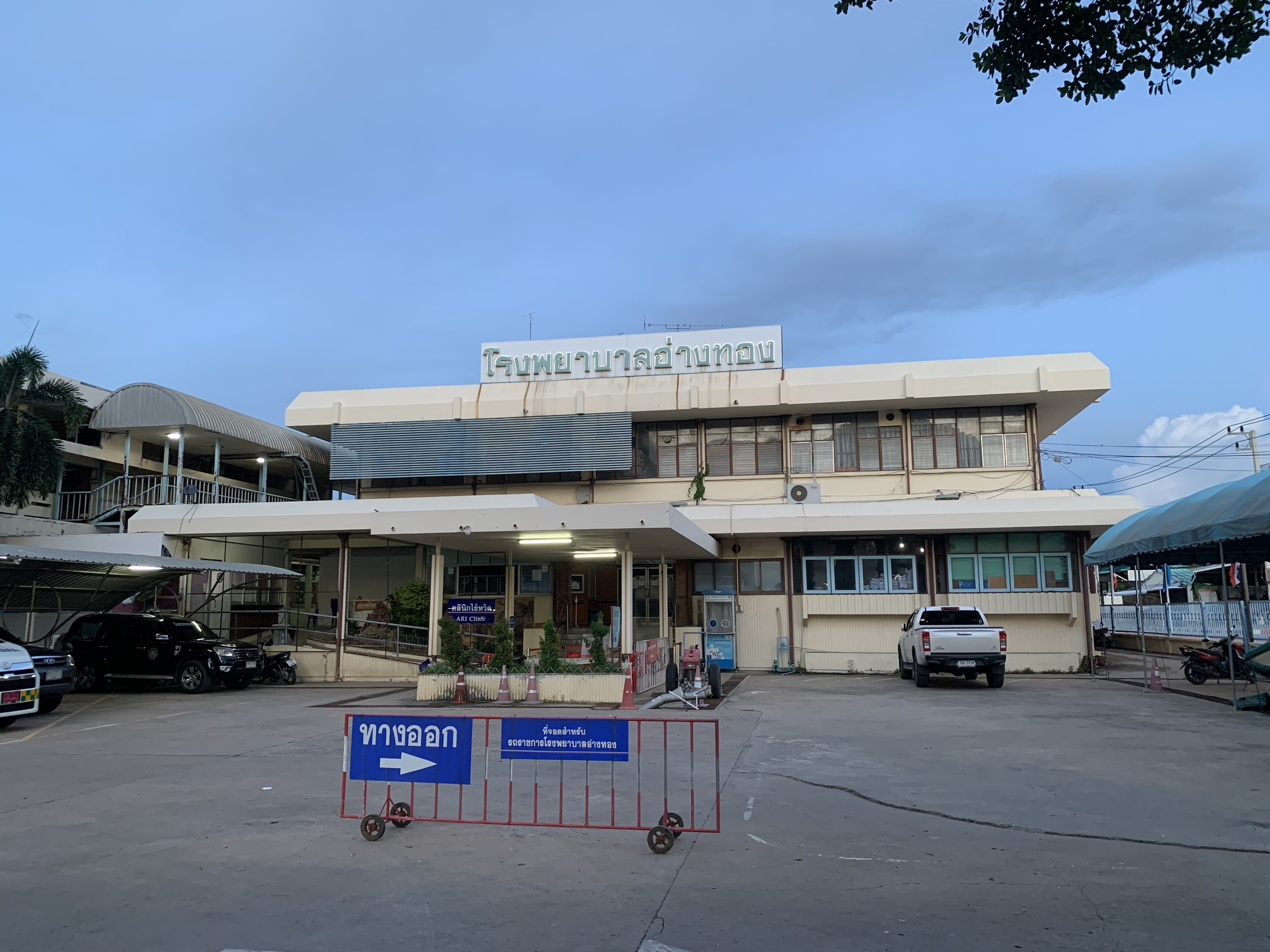
- Wat Ton Son, Ang Thong Wat Suwansewariyaram Mueang Ang Thong district office Angthong Hospital

- District location in Ang Thong province
- Coordinates: 14°35′19″N 100°27′12″E
- Country: Thailand
- Province: Ang Thong

Area
  - Total: 102.8 km^{2} (39.7 sq mi)

Population (2007)
  - Total: 55,974
  - Density: 544.5/km^{2} (1,410/sq mi)
- Time zone: UTC+7 (ICT)
- Postal code: 14000
- Geocode: 1501

Mueang Ang Thong (Thai: เมืองอ่างทอง, pronounced [mɯ̄a̯ŋ ʔàːŋ tʰɔ̄ːŋ]) is the capital district (amphoe mueang) of Ang Thong province, central Thailand.

== History ==
In the past, the district was called Mueang District. It was established in concert with the construction of the Ang Thong provincial hall, opposite Wat Chai Songkhram, Tambon Ban Hae, on the west bank of the Chao Phraya River.

In 1813 King Rama II ordered Chao Phraya Aphai Phuthon (เจ้าพระยาอภัยภูธร) to build a dam on the Chao Phraya River to manage water levels in Khlong Bang Kaeo for transportation all year. But the project did not succeed. So the provincial hall was moved opposite the mouth of Khlong Bang Kaeo on the east bank of the Chao Phraya River. The Mueang District office was moved at the same time. In 1917 the district was renamed from Mueang to Bang Kaeo after the name of the central tambon. The district office was moved out of Ang Thong's provincial hall in 1926 to a new location about 300 m south of the provincial hall. In 1938 the government renamed the district Mueang Ang Thong District.

== Geography ==
Neighboring districts are (from the south clockwise): Pa Mok, Wiset Chai Chan, Pho Thong, and Chaiyo of Ang Thong Province and Maha Rat of Ayutthaya province.

The important water resources are the Chao Phraya and Khlong Bang Kaeo.

== Administration ==
The district is divided into 14 sub-districts (tambons), which are further subdivided into 81 villages (mubans). Ang Thong itself is a town (thesaban mueang) and covers tambons Talat Luang and Bang Kaeo as well as parts of tambons Sala Daeng, Ban Hae, Ban It, Pho Sa, and Yansue. The sub-district municipality (thesaban tambon) Phosa covers tambons Phosa, and Sala Daeng those parts of the tambon Sala Daeng not covered by the town Ang Thong. There are a further eight tambon administrative organizations (TAO).

No.	Name	Thai	Pop.
1.	Talat Luang	ตลาดหลวง	7,741
2.	Bang Kaeo	บางแก้ว	2,584
3.	Sala Daeng	ศาลาแดง	6,701
4.	Pa Ngio	ป่างิ้ว	4,972
5.	Ban Hae	บ้านแห	3,826
6.	Talat Kruat	ตลาดกรวด	2,172
7.	Mahat Thai	มหาดไทย	1,668
8.	Ban It	บ้านอิฐ	6,540
9.	Hua Phai	หัวไผ่	4,307
10.	Champa Lo	จำปาหล่อ	3,634
11.	Phosa	โพสะ	4,391
12.	Ban Ri	บ้านรี	1,952
13.	Khlong Wua	คลองวัว	2,139
14.	Yan Sue	ย่านซื่อ	3,347
