= Jermsak Pinthong =

Thai economist

- เจิมศักดิ์ ปิ่นทอง
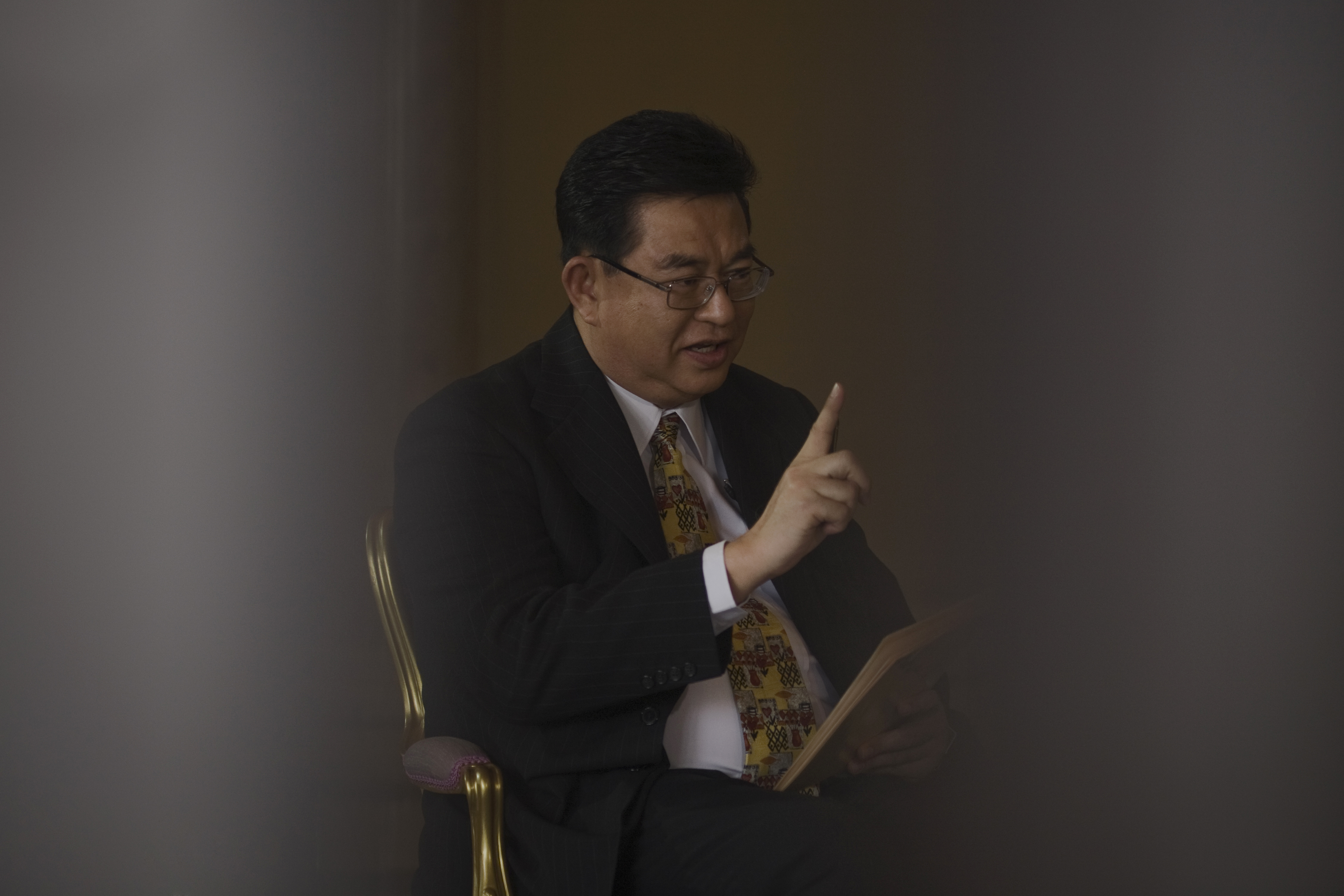
- Jermsak Pinthong in 2010
- Born: 3 November 1950 (age 75); San Chao Rong Thong, Ang Thong, Thailand
- Education: Thammasat University; Stanford University
- Occupations: Lecturer; TV host
- Years active: 1972–present
- Notable work: Mong Tang Mum; Vethee Chaoban; Kho Kid Duai Khon; Khlai Pom; Thon Phit
- Title: Named Professor
- Spouse: Jitriya Pinthong
- Children: Jaree Pinthong (only daughter)

Jermsak Pinthong (Thai: เจิมศักดิ์ ปิ่นทอง, RTGS: Choemsak Pinthong; born November 3, 1950, in Ang Thong province) is an independent economist, politics and economy TV host, and political commentator.

Pinthong was born at San Chao Rong Thong quarter along the Noi river in Ang Thong province, central region. His family was poor, his father was a local teacher who died when he was three years old. His mother was a Chinese immigrant trader who lived in Thailand as a child.

Pinthong graduated from Amnuay Silpa and Triam Udom Suksa Schools, graduated with a bachelor's and master's degree (first class honours) from Faculty of Economics, Thammasat University and received a PhD in Agricultural Economics from Stanford University, USA.

He used to be a lecturer at the Faculty of Economics, Thammasat University contemporary with Abhisit Vejjajiva, the 27th prime minister and the 7th Democrat Party leader. Besides teaching, he also does research on countryside. On Saturday - Sunday he often travels to remote rural areas to collect data and study the local economy.

He is widely known as the host of Mong Tang Mum (มองต่างมุม, "different perspectives") on Channel 11 (now NBT) since 1991 (Note: The program was co-hosted by Peter Maitree Ungphakorn, son of the renowned economist Puey Ungphakorn and elder brother of Giles Ungpakorn, together with Abhisit Vejjajiva. They took turns serving as hosts. At the time, both were members of the Faculty of Economics at Thammasat University.), a television program that allows participants to freely criticize the government or society, as well as many more in the same genre on Channel 9 and ASTV in the 1990s and 2020s. The program's format was adapted from the British political debate show Question Time.

Politically, he participated in the October 14 Event in 1973 while he was a Thammasat academic and joint with the People's Alliance for Democracy (PAD) or Yellow Shirts in 2006 and 2008, with the People's Democratic Reform Committee (PDRC) in 2013–14.

Pinthong was elected as a Bangkok senator from the first senator election of Thailand in 2000 according to the 1997 constitution, he won the third place in the vote. In 2020 he was appointed chairman of the Thai PBS board of governors.
