= Samko district =

Samko สามโก้
- Amphoe
- Amphoe location in Ang Thong province
- Coordinates: 14°36′20″N 100°14′41″E
- Country: Thailand
- Province: Ang Thong
- Tambon: 5
- Muban: 37

Area
  - Total: 95.4 km^{2} (36.8 sq mi)

Population (2012)
  - Total: 19,314
  - Density: 202/km^{2} (524/sq mi)
- Time zone: UTC+7 (ICT)
- Postal code: 14160
- Geocode: 1507

Samko (Thai: สามโก้, pronounced [sǎːm.kôː]) is the district (amphoe) in the western part of Ang Thong province, central Thailand.

== History ==
The district was separated from Wiset Chai Chan district to become a minor district (king amphoe) in 1962. It was upgraded to full district in 1965.

== Geography ==
Neighboring districts are (from the north clockwise) Pho Thong and Wiset Chai Chan of Ang Thong Province and Si Prachan of Suphanburi province.

== Administration ==
The district is divided into five sub-districts (tambon) and 37 administrative villages (muban). The sub-district municipality (thesaban tambon) Samko covers the tambon Samko, Ratsadon Phatthana, and Mongkhon Tham Nimit. Op Thom and Pho Muang Phan have a tambon administrative organization as their local government.

No.	Name	Thai	Villages	Pop.
1.	Samko	สามโก้	10	5,078
2.	Ratsadon Phatthana	ราษฎรพัฒนา	6	2,599
3.	Op Thom	อบทม	6	4,056
4.	Pho Muang Phan	โพธิ์ม่วงพันธ์	7	4,417
5.	Mongkhon Tham Nimit	มงคลธรรมนิมิต	8	3,164
