= Ang Thong =

- Town
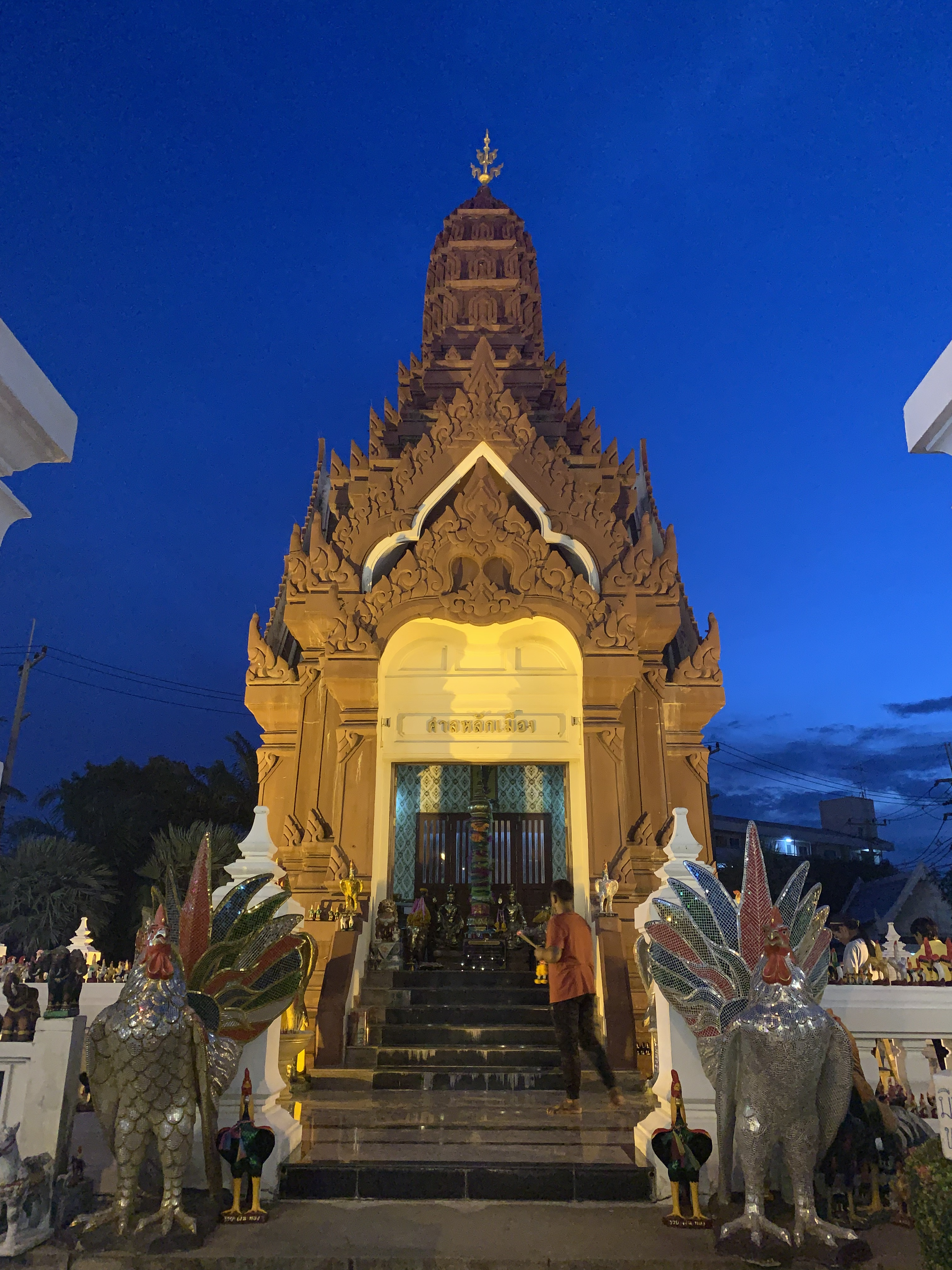
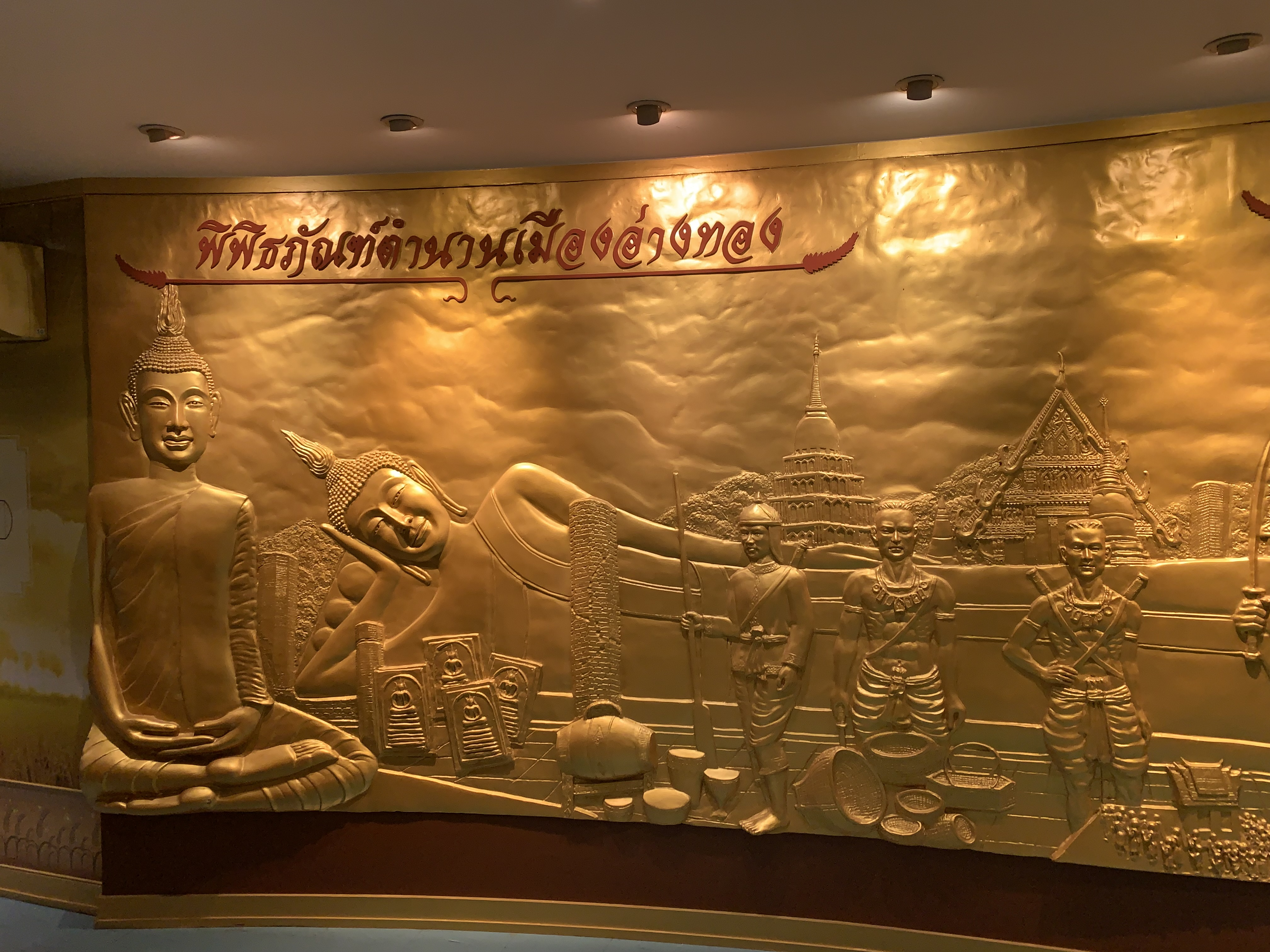
- Ang Thong City Pillar Shrine Museum of Ang Thong Legend

- Location in Thailand
- Coordinates: 14°35′33″N 100°27′26″E
- Country: Thailand
- Province: Ang Thong Province
- District: Amphoe Mueang Ang Thong

Population (2006)
  - Total: 13,738

Ang Thong (Thai: อ่างทอง, pronounced [ʔàːŋ tʰɔ̄ːŋ]) is a town (thesaban mueang) in Thailand, capital of Ang Thong Province. The town covers the entirety of tambon Talat Luang and Bang Kaeo as well as parts of tambon Sala Daeng, Ban Hae, Ban It, Pho Sa, and Yansue, all of Mueang Ang Thong District. As of 2006 it had a population of 13,738. The town is on the Chao Phraya River.

== History ==
Ang Thong was originally known as Muang Wiset Chai Chan. The original location of Muang Wiset Chai Chan was on the Noi River. Muang Wiset Chai Chan was a frontier outpost of Ayutthaya during the war with the Burmese, and the site of a Burmese encampment en route to the Battle of Bang Rachan in Singburi. During the Thonburi period, Muang Wiset Chai Chan was moved to the left bank of the Chao Phraya River at Ban Bangkaeo and was renamed "Muang Angthong."
