= Pa Mok district =

Pa Mok ป่าโมก
- District
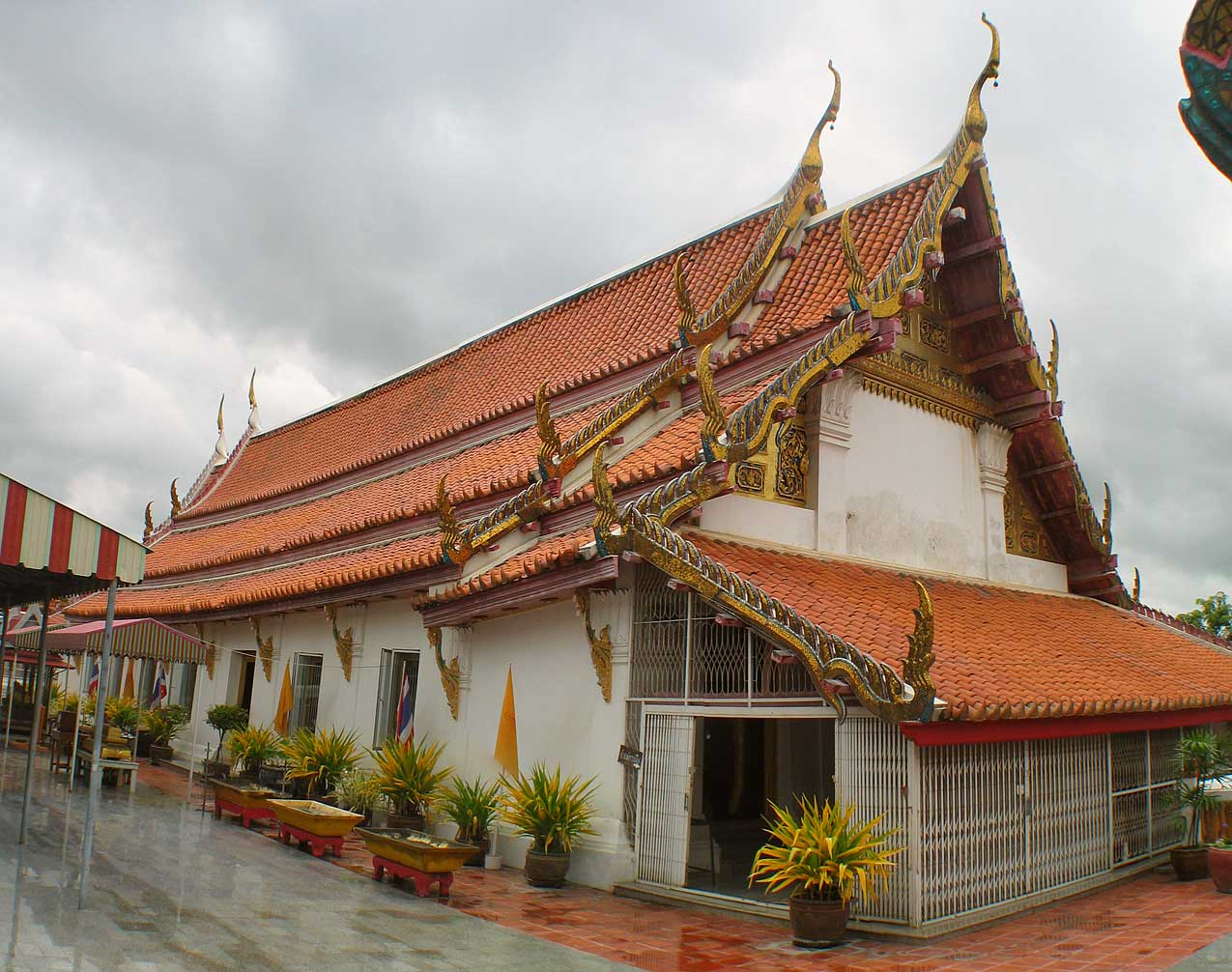
- Viharn of the Reclining Buddha at Wat Pa Mok

- District location in Ang Thong province
- Coordinates: 14°29′24″N 100°26′53″E
- Country: Thailand
- Province: Ang Thong

Area
  - Total: 80.9 km^{2} (31.2 sq mi)

Population (2000)
  - Total: 28,140
  - Density: 348/km^{2} (901/sq mi)
- Time zone: UTC+7 (ICT)
- Postal code: 14130
- Geocode: 1503

Pa Mok (Thai: ป่าโมก, pronounced [pàː môːk]) is the southernmost district (amphoe) of Ang Thong province, central Thailand.

== History ==
This area was called Ban Pa Mok Noi. In 1585 King Naresuan the Great set his military camp in the area. Before moving his troops to fight with Burmese troops of Phra Maha Uparacha at Don Chedi, he saluted the big Reclining Buddha in Pa Mok. And he won the war.

During the reign of King Thai Sa, he was the leader of workers who moved the reclining Buddha to save it from flooding.

Pa Mok district was separated from Mueang Ang Thong district and upgraded to a full district in 1902. The first district office was finished in 1904.

== Geography ==
Neighboring districts are (from the north clockwise): Wiset Chai Chan and Mueang Ang Thong of Ang Thong Province, and Maha Rat, Bang Pahan, Bang Ban and Phak Hai of Ayutthaya province.

== Administration ==
The district is divided into eight sub-districts (tambons). The township (thesaban tambon) Pa Mok covers tambons Pa Mok and Bang Pla Kot.

No.	Name	Thai
1.	Bang Pla Kot	บางปลากด
2.	Pa Mok	ป่าโมก
3.	Sai Thong	สายทอง
4.	Rong Chang	โรงช้าง
5.	Bang Sadet	บางเสด็จ
6.	Norasing	นรสิงห์
7.	Ekkarat	เอกราช
8.	Phong Pheng	โผงเผง
