= Wat Pa Mok =

Buddhist temple in Thailand

- วัดป่าโมกวรวิหาร
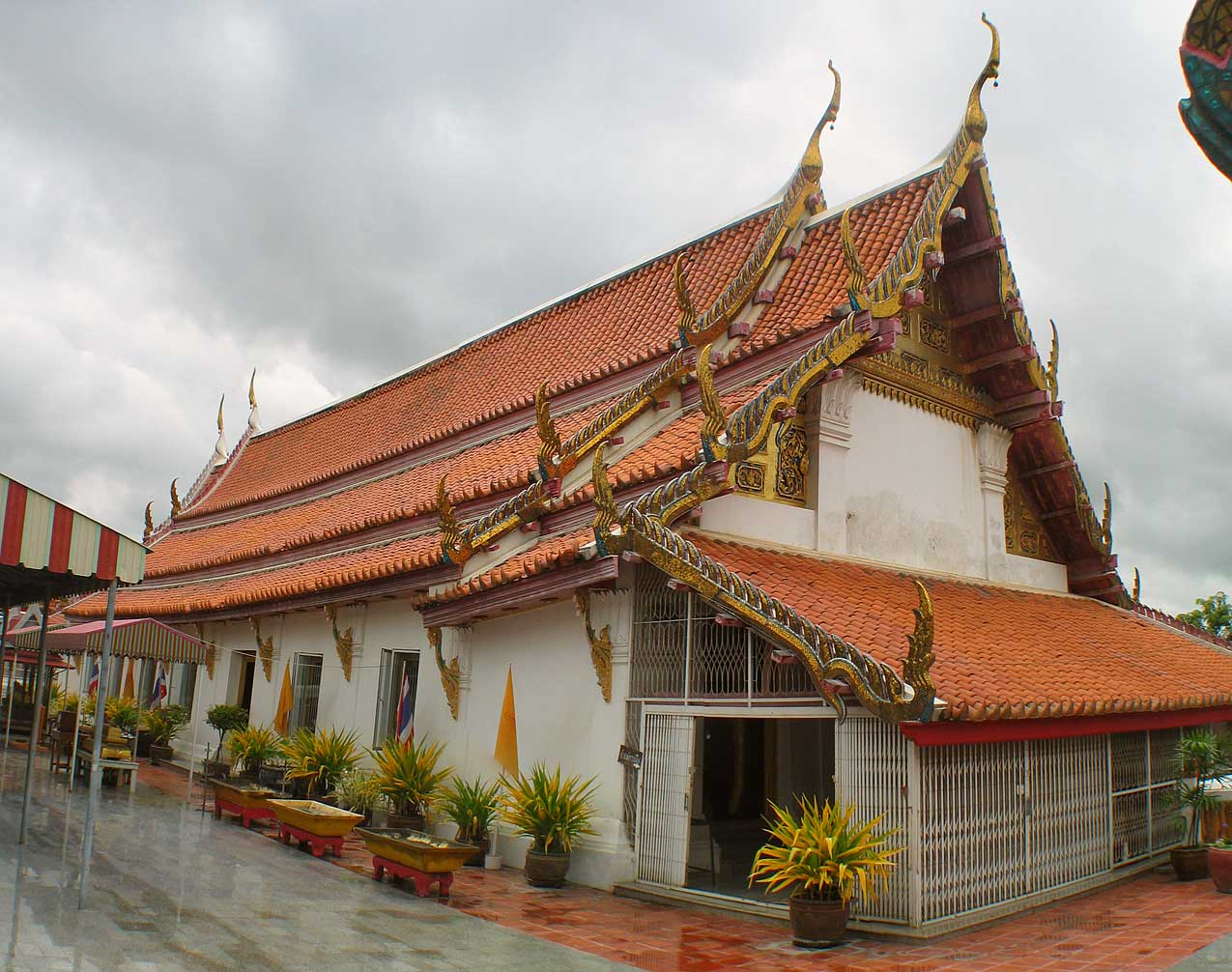

Religion
- Affiliation: Buddhist
- Sect: Theravāda

Location
- Location: Pa Mok district, Ang Thong province
- Country: Thailand
- Interactive map of Wat Pa Mok
- Coordinates: 14°28′56″N 100°26′54″E

Wat Pa Mok Worawihan (Thai: วัดป่าโมกวรวิหาร) is a Buddhist temple in Pa Mok district, Ang Thong province, Thailand.
