= Wiset Chai Chan district =

Wiset Chai Chan วิเศษชัยชาญ
- District
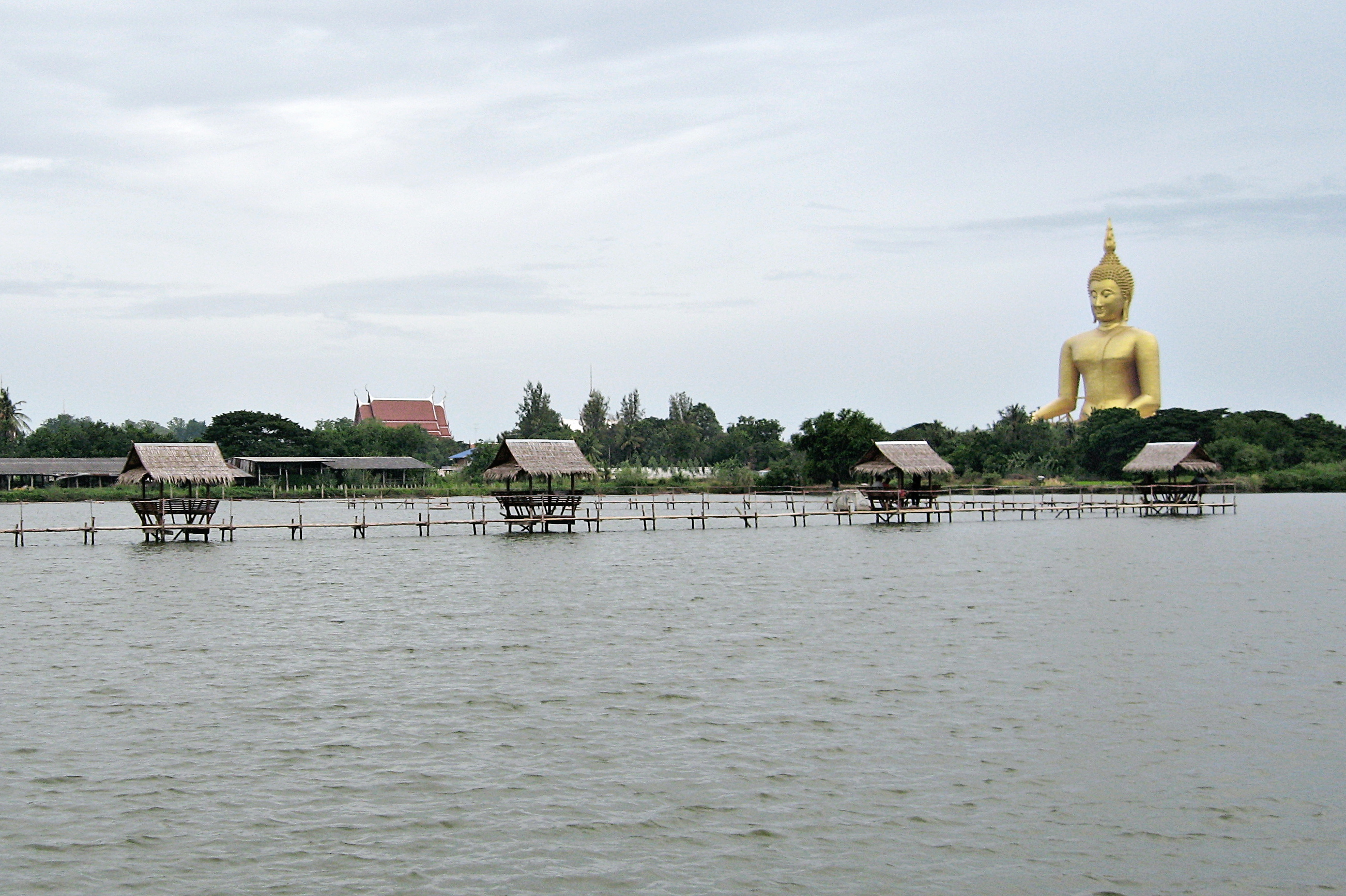
- Phra Buddha Maha Nawamin Sakayamuni Sri Wisetchaichan or better known as Great Buddha of Thailand, principal Buddha image of Wat Muang a well-known local temple, regarded as the largest Buddha image in Thailand

- District location in Ang Thong province
- Coordinates: 14°35′40″N 100°20′19″E
- Country: Thailand
- Province: Ang Thong

Area
  - Total: 224.7 km^{2} (86.8 sq mi)

Population (2000)
  - Total: 65,298
  - Density: 290.6/km^{2} (752.7/sq mi)
- Time zone: UTC+7 (ICT)
- Postal code: 14110
- Geocode: 1506

Wiset Chai Chan (Thai: วิเศษชัยชาญ, pronounced [wí.sèːt t͡ɕʰāj t͡ɕʰāːn]) is a district (amphoe) in the southwestern part of Ang Thong province, central Thailand.

== History ==
When King Naresuan the Great defeated the Burmese troops at Don Chedi, he led his troops past Phai Cham Sin. He saw the strategic potential of the area with the Noi River as a natural obstacle for the Burmese troops. Thus he established Mueang Wiset Chai Chan there.

In the Rattanakosin era, the Noi River had become shallow and was no longer navigable for water transportation. The government thus moved the central tambon of the mueang to Bang Kaeo, on the Chao Phraya River bank and called the new area Ang Thong. At the same time, they downgraded the district to Phai Cham Sin District. King Chulalongkorn (Rama V) ordered the district to assume its historical name, Wiset Chai Chan. In 1979 the office district was moved to the Pho Phraya-Tha Rua Road in Tambon San Chao Rong Thong.

== Geography ==
Neighboring districts are (from the north clockwise) Samko, Pho Thong, Mueang Ang Thong, and Pa Mok of Ang Thong Province; Phak Hai of Ayutthaya province and Mueang Suphanburi; and Si Prachan of Suphanburi province.

== Administration ==
The district is divided into 15 sub-districts (tambons). There are two townships (thesaban tambons) within the district. San Chao Rong Thong covers parts of tambons San Chao Rong Thong and Phai Cham Sin, and Bang Chak covers parts of the tambons Bang Chak, Khlong Khanak, and Si Roi.

No.	Name	Thai
1.	Phai Cham Sin	ไผ่จำศิล
2.	San Chao Rong Thong	ศาลเจ้าโรงทอง
3.	Phai Dam Phatthana	ไผ่ดำพัฒนา
4.	Sao Rong Hai	สาวร้องไห้
5.	Tha Chang	ท่าช้าง
6.	Yi Lon	ยี่ล้น
7.	Bang Chak	บางจัก
8.	Huai Khan Laen	ห้วยคันแหลน
9.	Khlong Khanak	คลองขนาก
10.	Phai Wong	ไผ่วง
11.	Si Roi	สี่ร้อย
12.	Muang Tia	ม่วงเตี้ย
13.	Hua Taphan	หัวตะพาน
14.	Lak Kaeo	หลักแก้ว
15.	Talat Mai	ตลาดใหม่
