= Ang Thong province =

Province of Thailand

Coordinates: 14°35′20″N 100°27′17″E

Ang Thong อ่างทอง
- Province
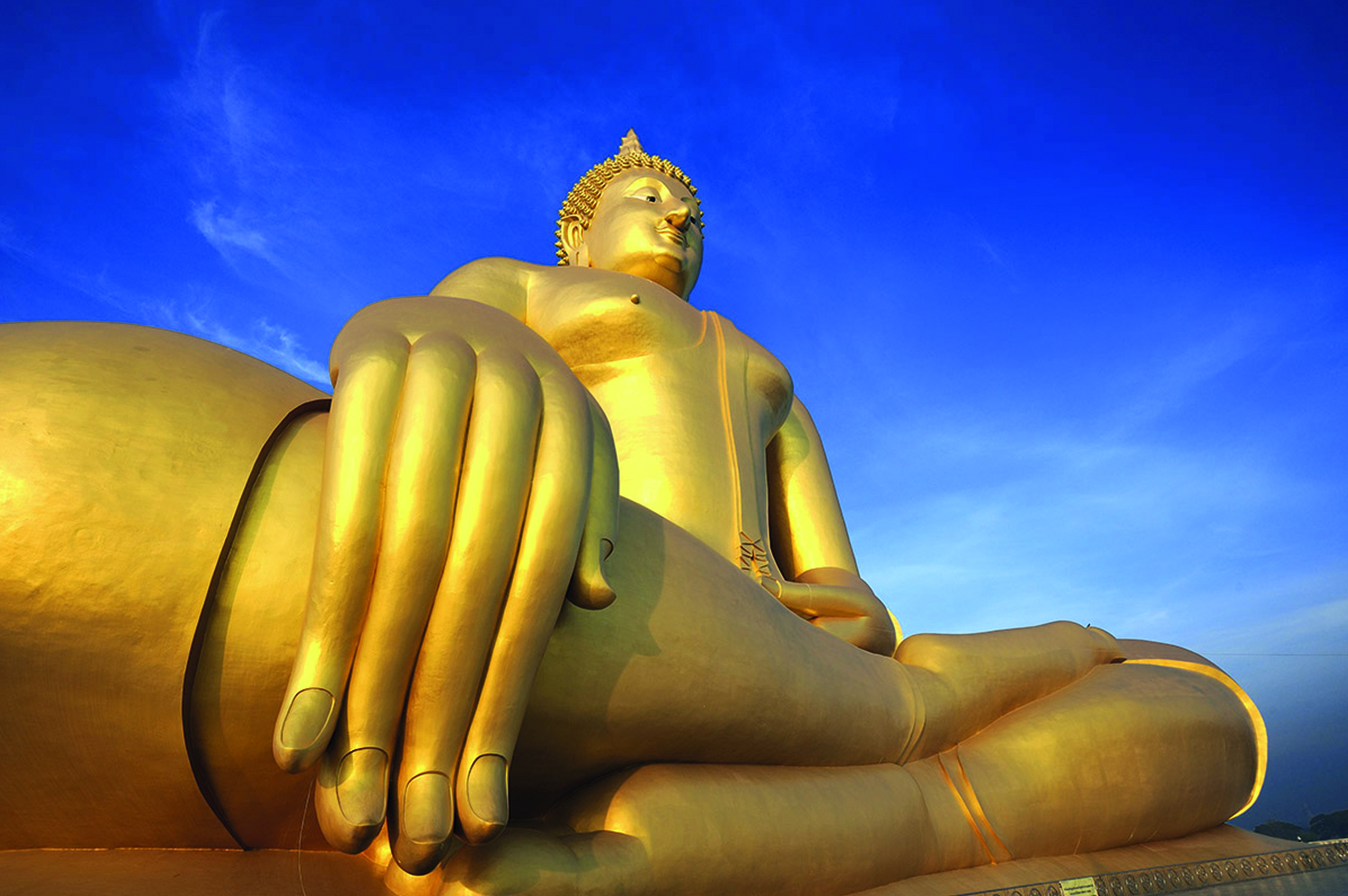
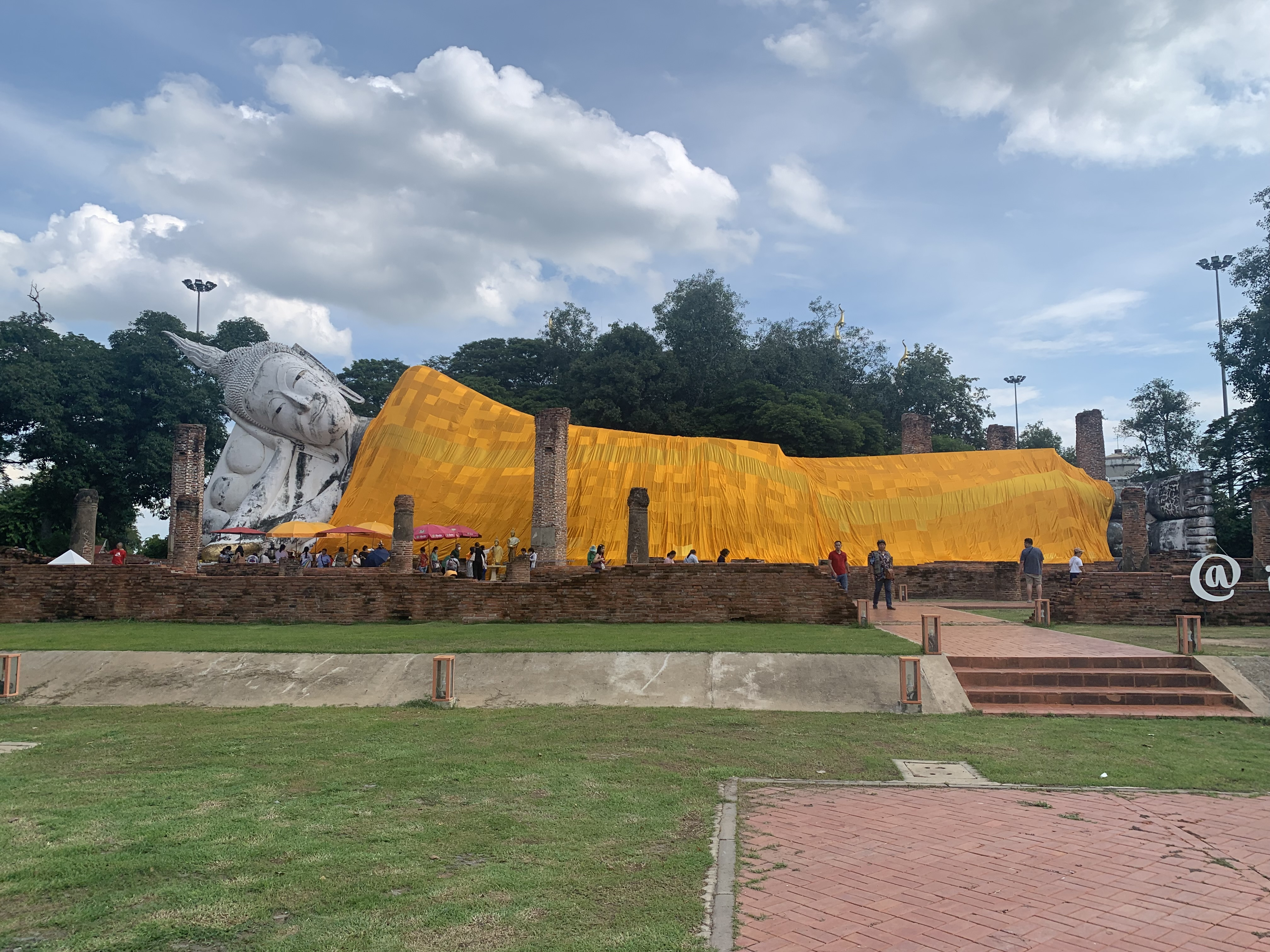
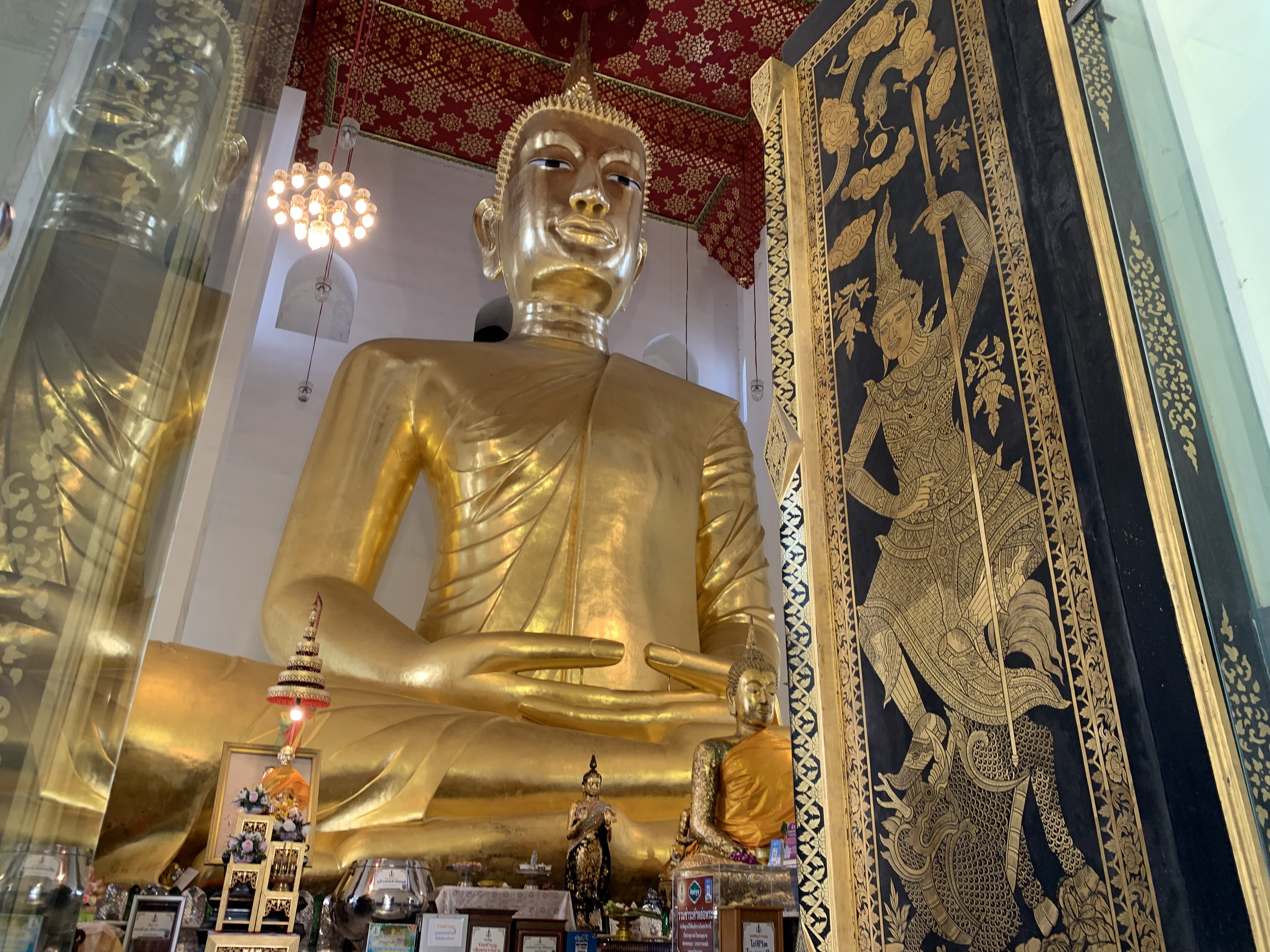
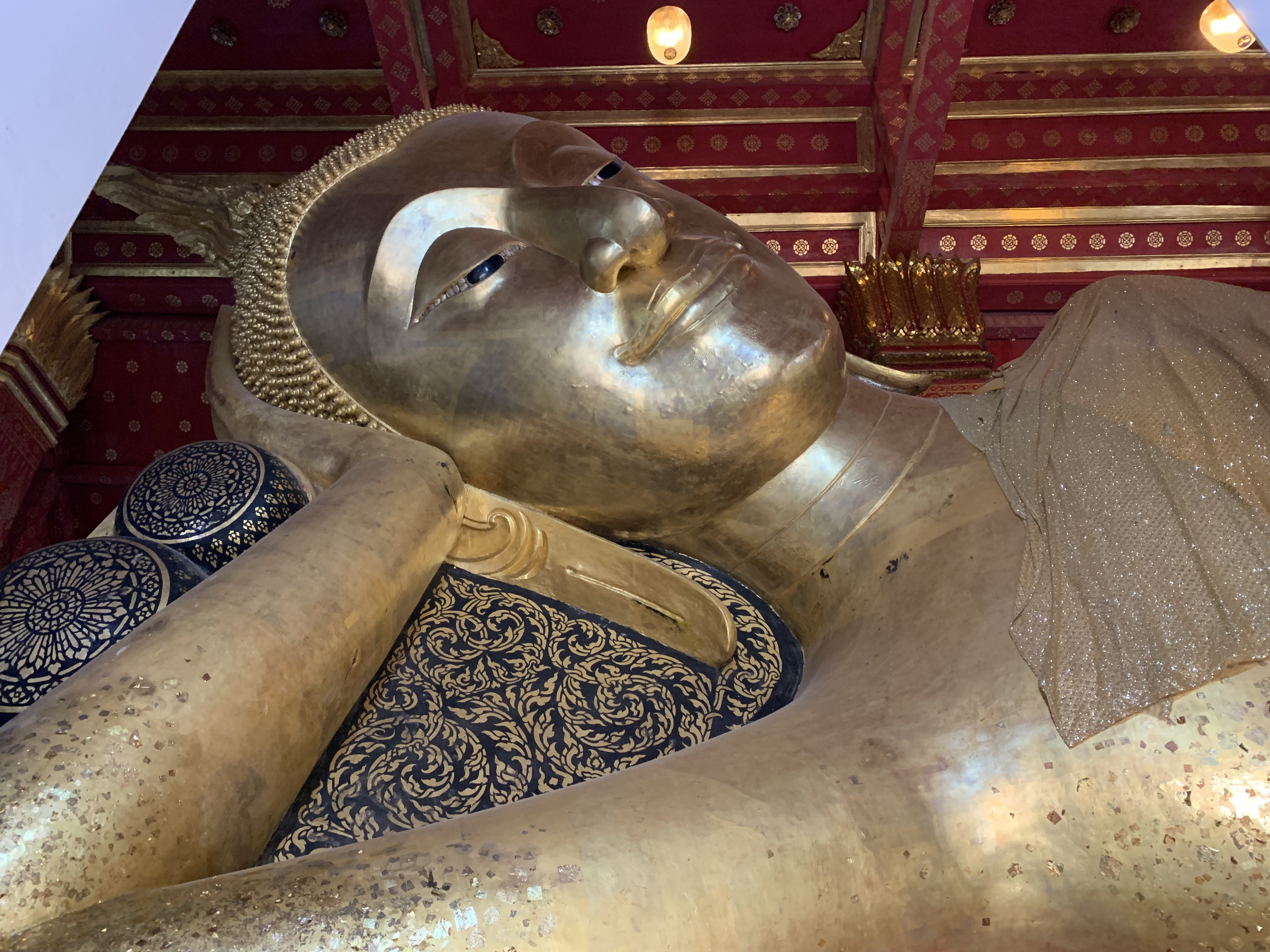
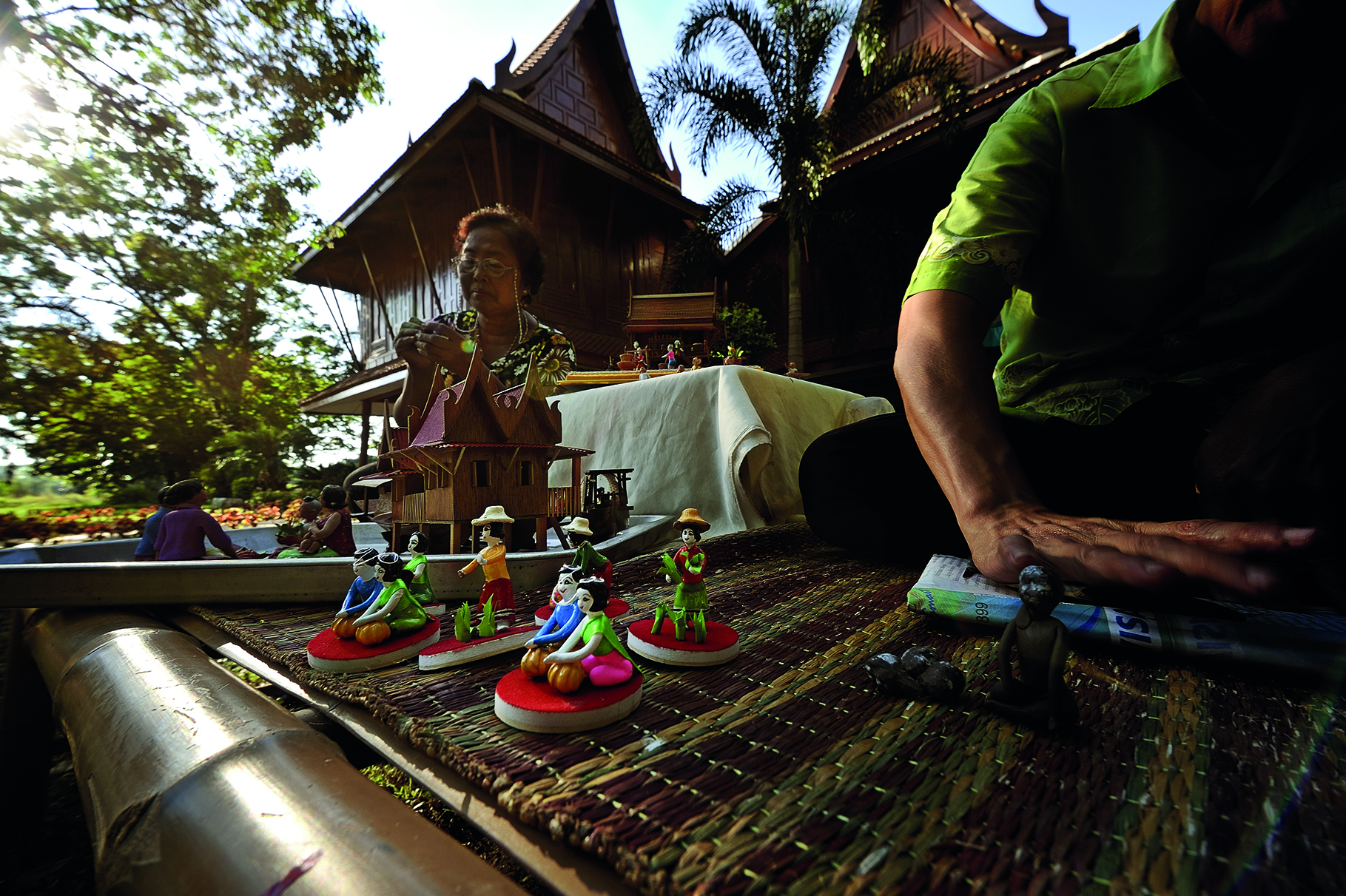
- Great Buddha of Thailand of Wat Muang Reclining Buddha of Wat Khun Inthapramun Big Buddha of Wat Chaiyo Worawihan Reclining Buddha of Wat Pa Mok Court doll workshop at Ban Bang Sadet Court Doll Centre

- Flag Seal
- Motto: พระสมเด็จเกษไชโย หลวงพ่อโตองค์ใหญ่ วีรไทยใจกล้า ตุ๊กตาชาววัง โด่งดังจักสาน ถิ่นฐานทำกลอง เมืองสองพระนอน ("Phra Somdet Ket Chaiyo. Large Buddha image of Luang Pho To. Brave Thai heroes. Palace dolls. Famous Wickers. Homeland of drums production. City of two reclining buddhas.")
- Map of Thailand highlighting Ang Thong province
- Country: Thailand
- Capital: Ang Thong

Government
  - Type: Province and Provincial Administrative Organization
  - Body: Ang Thong Province and Ang Thong Provincial Administrative Organization
  - Governor: Chawanin Wongsathitjirakan
  - PAO Chief Executive: Surachet Nimkul

Area
  - Total: 950 km^{2} (370 sq mi)
  - Rank: 71st

Population (2024)
  - Total: ▼268,875
  - Rank: 71st
  - Density: 283/km^{2} (730/sq mi)
  - Rank: 12th

Human Achievement Index
  - HAI (2022): 0.6457 "average" Ranked 32nd

GDP
  - Total: baht 28 billion (US$1.0 billion) (2019)
- Time zone: UTC+7 (ICT)
- Postal code: 14xxx
- Calling code: 035
- ISO 3166 code: TH-15
- Website: angthong.go.th angt.go.th

Ang Thong (Thai: อ่างทอง, pronounced [ʔàːŋ tʰɔ̄ːŋ]) or Angthong is one of the central provinces (changwat) of Thailand. The name "Ang Thong" means 'gold basin', thought to have derived from the basin-like geography of the area, and the golden color of the rice grown in the region.

Neighboring provinces are (from north clockwise) Sing Buri, Lopburi, Ayutthaya, and Suphan Buri.

Ang Thong native handicrafts include moulded court dolls, firebrick, and wickerwork.

Ang Thong has more than 200 Buddhist temples, but there are nine distinct temples that are promoted as "Paying Homage to Nine Auspicious Temples". This consists of Wat Chaiyo Worawihan, Wat Khun Inthapramun, Wat Pa Mok Worawihan, Wat Tonson, Wat Mahanam, Wat Thasutthawat, Wat Siroi, Wat Khian and, Wat Muang where the Great Buddha of Thailand is enshrined.

== Geography ==
Ang Thong occupies a low river plain, created by the Chao Phraya and the Noi Rivers. It has neither mountains nor forests, but consists of mostly agricultural land. The two rivers, together with many canals (khlongs), provide enough water for rice farming.

== History ==
Statue of Khun Rong Palat Chu

Ang Thong was historically known as Wiset Chai Chan, on the Noi River. It was an important border town of the Ayutthaya Kingdom during the wars with Burma, as the Noi River served as a natural obstacle for advancing troops.

During the reign of King Taksin after the fall of Ayutthaya, the main city of the province was moved to the Chao Phraya River, and named Ang Thong, as the Noi River had become silted and too shallow for transportation.

Ang Thong is the provenance of Likay, the native folk song, and the hometown of Nai Dok and Nai Thongkaeo, two heroes of the Bang Rachan Battle.

Khun Rong Palat Chu is another local hero of Ang Thong. His heroism is little known when compared to the villagers of Bang Rachan because only two lines were recorded in the Thai chronicles. He grouped up and led four hundred volunteer sword fighters under the name "Kong Attamat" to accompany the royal army from the capital during the royal army's settlement at Mueang Kui (present-day Prachuap Khiri Khan Province). His group received a command to obstruct the Burmese army 8,000 people at Ao Wa Khao (in present-day Ao Noi, Mueang Prachuap Khiri Khan) in 1760 when King Alaungpaya of Burma invaded Myeik (Burmese–Siamese War (1759–60)) part of Ayutthaya Kingdom at that time. In the end, they all died of four hundred people. Nowadays, there is a monument built to commemorate his heroism at Wat Siroi, Wiset Chai Chan.

== Symbols ==
The provincial seal shows some golden ears of rice in a bowl of water. This symbolizes the fertility of the province as one of the major producers of rice. The provincial tree is the gaub tree (Diospyros malabarica). The provincial fish is red tailed tinfoil (Barbonymus altus).

== Administrative divisions ==
=== Provincial government ===
Ang Thong with 7 districts

The province is divided into seven districts (amphoes). The districts are further subdivided into 73 subdistricts (tambons) and 513 villages (mubans).

1. Mueang Ang Thong
2. Chaiyo
3. Pa Mok
4. Pho Thong
5. Sawaeng Ha
6. Wiset Chai Chan
7. Samko

=== Local government ===
As of 26 November 2019 there are: one Ang Thong Provincial Administration Organisation (ongkan borihan suan changwat) and 21 municipal (thesaban) areas in the province. Ang Thong has town (thesaban mueang) status. Further 20 subdistrict municipalities (thesaban tambon). The non-municipal areas are administered by 43 Subdistrict Administrative Organisations - SAO (ongkan borihan suan tambon).

== Economy ==
=== Economic output ===
In 2022, Ang Thong province had an economic output of 31.947 billion baht (US$840 billion). This amounts to per capita gross provincial product (GPP) of 130,469 baht (US$3,430). In 2024 the total labour force was 127,720 of which 125,244 persons were employed in economic activity. In agriculture and fishing 28,921 persons (23.1%) were employed and in the non-agricultural sector 96,323 persons (76.9%).

Gross Provincial Product (GPP)
	Activities	Baht	Percent
1	Manufacturing	6,198,000,000	19.4
2	Agriculture and fishing	4,795,000,000	15.0
3	Trade	4,434,000,000	13.9
4	Mining	2,636,000,000	8.3
5	Energy	2,274,000,000	7.1
6	Finance	2,084,000,000	6.5
7	Education	1,944,000,000	6.1
8	Transportation	1,499,000,000	4.7
9	Human health	1,485,000,000	4.6
10	Defence + publ.admin.	1,358,000,000	4.3
11	Real estate	1,173,000,000	3.7
12	Construction	1,068,000,000	3.3
13	Information	312,000,000	1.0
14	Other service activity	227,000,000	0.7
15	Pastime	202,000,000	0.6
16	Water supply	153,000,000	0.5
17	Administration	64,000,000	0.2
18	Hotel and restaurant	35,000,000	0.1
19	Scientific activity	6,000,000	0.0
	Total	31,947,000,000	100

Employed persons
	Activities	Workforce	Percent
1	Agriculture and fishing	28,921	23.1
2	Manufacturing	25,182	20.1
3	Trade	22,034	17.6
4	Hotel and restaurant	11,876	9.5
5	Defence + publ.admin.	9,870	7.9
6	Construction	7,646	6.1
7	Education	3,738	3.0
8	Transportation	3,691	2.9
9	Human health	3,009	2.4
10	Other service activity	1,906	1.5
11	Administration	1,527	1.2
12	Water supply	1,206	0.9
13	Household enterprise	989	0.8
14	Finance	893	0.7
15	Pastime	854	0.7
16	Scientific activity	592	0.5
17	Energy	585	0.5
18	Mining	410	0.3
19	Real estate	202	0.2
20	Information	113	0.1
	Total	125,244	100

== Human achievement index 2022 ==
Health	Education	Employment	Income
55	12	16	25
Housing	Family	Transport	Participation
34	77	25	25
Province Ang Thong, with an HAI 2022 value of 0.6457 is "average", occupies place 32 in the ranking.

Since 2003, United Nations Development Programme (UNDP) in Thailand has tracked progress on human development at sub-national level using the human achievement index (HAI), a composite index covering all the eight key areas of human development. National Economic and Social Development Board (NESDB) has taken over this task since 2017.

Rank	Classification
1 - 13	"high"
14 - 29	"somewhat high"
30 - 45	"average"
46 - 61	"somewhat low"
62 - 77	"low"

Map with provinces and HAI 2022 rankings

== Notable people ==
- Somsak Prissanananthakul: politician
- Pleumjit Thinkaow: world-class volleyball player
- Pipob Thongchai: activist
- Jermsak Pinthong: economist, political commentator, TV host
- Chaiya Mitchai: likay dancer, singer, actor, TV host
- Kohtee Aramboy: comedian, actor, TV host
- Ja R-Siam: singer
