= Uthumphon =

Uthumphon อุทุมพร
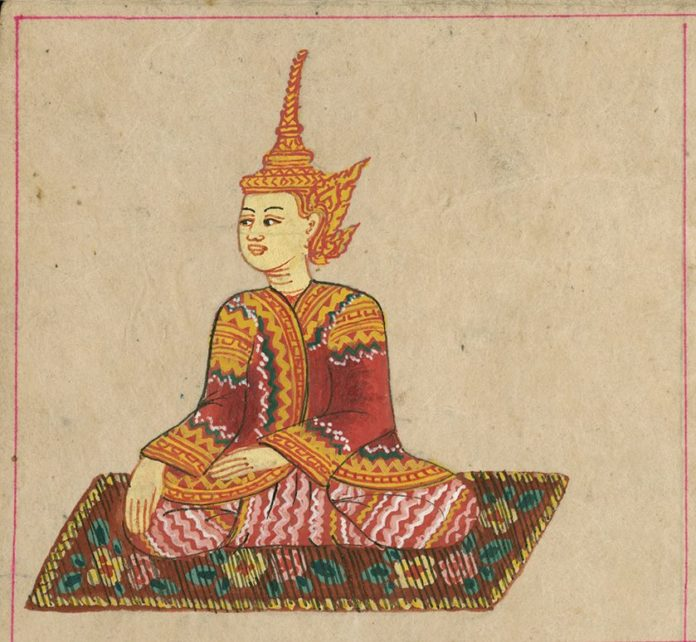
- A Burmese depiction of an Ayutthaya king, either depicting Uthumphon or Ekkathat, British Library, London

King of Ayutthaya
- Reign: 1 May 1758 – 1758 (3 months); 1759/1760 – 1762
- Predecessor: Borommakot
- Successor: Ekkathat

Viceroy of Ayutthaya
- Tenure: 1757–1758
- Appointer: Borommakot
- Predecessor: Thammathibet
- Successor: Inthraphithak (as Viceroy of Thonburi)
- Born: c. 1733; Ayutthaya Kingdom
- Died: 1796 (aged ~63); Mandalay, Konbaung Burma
- Burial: Amarapura, Myanmar; 21°53′43″N 96°02′51″E
- Spouse: Thao Toi
- Dynasty: Ban Phlu Luang
- Father: Borommakot
- Mother: Phiphitmontri

Uthumphon (Thai: อุทุมพร; Burmese: ဥဒုမ္ဗရ) Maha Thammarachathirat III or Uthumphon Mahaphon Phinit (Thai: อุทุมพรมหาพรพินิต; c. 1733– 1796) was the 32nd and penultimate monarch of the Ayutthaya Kingdom, ruling in 1758 for about three months. Facing various throne claimants, Uthumphon was finally forced to abdicate and enter monkhood. His preference of being a monk rather than keeping the throne earned him the epithet "Khun Luang Ha Wat" (Thai: ขุนหลวงหาวัด), or "the king who lives in the temple".

His memorial tomb is located in the Linzin Hill (လင်းဇင်ကုန်း, lit. 'Lan Xang Hill') cemetery in Amarapura, about 500 metres (1,600 ft) northeast of the U Bein Bridge.

== Early life ==
Uthumphon was born in 1730 during the reign of his uncle King Thai Sa. Uthumphon's father Prince Phon was the younger brother of King Thai Sa and the Wangna or vice king of the Front Palace, the royal heir presumptive. Uthumphon's mother was Princess Consort Phlap, one of the two main consorts of Prince Phon, daughter of Chaophraya Bamroe Phuthorn (Thai: เจ้าพระยาบำเรอภูธร), a prominent noble during the reign of King Phetracha. Shortly before Uthumphon's birth, his father Prince Phon dreamed of seeing flowers of Udumbhara or Buddhist holy fig. As the flowers of the Udumbhara are of rare occurrences, sighting one implies a significant event. Prince Phon them named his newborn son Prince Uthumphon (from Udumbhara) or Dok Ma Duea ("fig flower") or Dokduea.

Uthumphon was the youngest child born to his mother Princess Consort Phlap, being more than ten years younger than his older brother Ekkathat. Uthumphon also had five elder sisters who shared the same mother.

After a succession struggle, Prince Phon, Uthumphon's father, ascended the throne as King Borommakot in 1733. Princess Consort Phlap, Uthumphon's mother, became Queen Kromma Luang Phiphitmontri (Thai: กรมหลวงพิพิธมนตรี). To prevent future dynastic conflicts, Borommakot controlled the allocation of manpower strength among his sons, the royal princes, through the creation of Kroms or princely manpower regiments. Prince Uthumphon or Prince Dokduea was later granted a Krom with the title Kromma Khun Phonphinit (Thai: กรมขุนพรพินิต).

Three sons of Borommakot; Thammathibet, Ekkathat, and Uthumphon, who were born to his two main queens, were given the superior rank of Kromma Khun, meaning that they could appoint their officials and servants to the rank of Khun. Meanwhile, four other sons of Borommakot who were born to his lesser secondary consorts were given the inferior rank of Kromma Muen, meaning that they could appoint their servants only to the rank of Muen.

Prince Thammathibet, eldest son of Borommakot and Uthumphon's half-older brother, was appointed as Uparat or Wangna or vice king of the Front Palace in 1741, technically as heir presumptive. After the death of Chaophraya Chamnan Borirak the Chief Minister in 1753, the Siamese royal court was plunged into princely conflicts. Two factions formed, composing of the three superior princes Thammathibet, Ekkathat, and Uthumphon on one side and the three of Borommakot's secondary sons, Princes Kromma Muen Chitsunthorn, Kromma Muen Sunthornthep, and Kromma Muen Sepphakdi, known collectively as Chao Sam Krom (Thai: เจ้าสามกรม) or the Three Princes, on the opposing side.

In 1756, the Three Princes appointed some of their servants to the rank of Khun, surpassing the limit of their princely ranks. Prince Thammathibet of the Front Palace took this violation of princely ranks seriously. Thammathibet sent his forces to arrest Prince Sunthornthep, one of the Three Princes. Prince Sunthornthep escaped to tell their father King Borommakot about the incident. King Borommakot summoned Thammathibet for inquisition but Thammathibet visited his father the king with a sword in his hand. Borommakot then had Thammathibet imprisoned and interrogated. It was revealed that Thammathibet had been in secret romantic relationships with two of Borommakot's secondary consorts and had been planning a sedition. Prince Thammathibet the royal heir and Prince of the Front Palace was whipped with one hundred and eighty strokes of rattan cane, died from injuries in April 1756.

== Prince of the Front Palace ==
The death of Thammathibet, Uthumphon's elder half-brother, in 1756 left the position of Uparat or Wangna vacant. In 1757, Prince Kromma Muen Thepphiphit, one of Borommakot's secondary sons and a half-older brother of Uthumphon, in concert with other prominent Chatusadom ministers including Chaophraya Aphairacha the Samuha Nayok or Chief Minister and Chaophraya Kalahom Khlongklaeb the Minister of Military, proposed King Borommakot to make Prince Uthumphon or Prince Phonphinit the new Uparat or heir presumptive. Uthumphon initially refused, saying that he had an older brother Prince Ekkathat or Prince Kromma Khun Anurak Montri. King Borommakot, however, stated that Ekkathat was incompetent, sure to bring disaster to the kingdom and Uthumphon was preferred as vice-king and potential heir; "I only see that Kromma Khun Phonphinit possesses wisdom and is intelligent, entitled to maintain the white umbrella to reign and to continue the kingdom." (Thai: เหนแต่กรมขุนพรพินิจ กอปด้วยสติปัญาเฉลียวฉลาดหลักแหลม สมควรจะดำรงเสวตรฉัตรครองสมบัติรักษาแผ่นดินสืบไปได้).

With supports from prominent ministers, Uthumphon finally consented to his father's wish. Uthumphon underwent Uparajabhisekha ceremony to be consecrated as the new Uparat or Prince of the Front Palace and technically heir presumptive to his father Borommakot in 1757. Uthumphon was also given his half-niece, a daughter of the deceased prince Thammathibet, to be his consort but the couple never produced children. Uthumphon did not move into the Front Palace or Chanbaworn Palace on the northeastern corner of Ayutthaya per his position but continued to stay at his residence at Suan Kratai Pavilion, bordering Wat Phra Si Sanphet temple to the west. King Borommakot also forced Prince Ekkathat, Uthumphon's older brother, to shave his head to become a Buddhist monk at Wat Lamut temple to the northeast of Ayutthaya in order to prevent Ekkathat from contesting against Uthumphon for the throne in the future.

Meanwhile, to the west of Siam, King Alaungpaya of the rising new Burmese Konbaung dynasty, conquered the Kingdom of Hanthawaddy of the Mon people of Lower Burma in 1757, unifying Upper and Lower Burma under his new regime.

== The Three Princes ==
On the fifth waning of the sixth month, Year 1120 of Culāsakaraj Era, King Borommakot fell gravely ill. Borommakot, in order to ensure peaceful succession, summoned the Three Princes to swear oath and fealty to the new king Uthumphon in front of Borommakot. Prince Ekkathat, Uthumphon's older brother, who had been exiled to be a Buddhist monk at Wat Lamut temple, returned to Ayutthaya to support Uthumphon. After reigning for twenty-five years, King Borommakot died on that day on 29 April 1758. After the death of King Borommakot, the Three Princes did not uphold their oath and contested against Uthumphon for kingship.

Ayutthayan royal regalia were taken to be under possession of Uthumphon at his residence the Suan Kratai Pavilion. The Three Princes, in turn, took possession of royal swords and firearms at Banyong Rattanat Throne Hall. The new king Uthumphon summoned all the princes and officials to swear loyalty to him at Suan Kratai Pavilion, in which the Three Princes did not come. Upon learning this movement of the Three Princes, Ekkathat commanded Prince Kromma Muen Thepphiphit to take all firearms of the Royal Armory to Suan Kratai Palace to intimidate the Three Princes. The Three Princes, in response, sent forces to break into the Regular Armory to seize all the firearms.

With a civil war looming in Ayutthaya, Uthumphon and Ekkathat devised a plan to subjugate the Three Princes. Uthumphon asked five senior Buddhist prelates, led by Phra Thepmuni the abbot of Wat Kudidao temple, to persuade the Three Princes to surrender peacefully. The five virtuous monks then visited the Three Princes to beseech them to cease their belligerent actions. A week later, on he eleventh waning of the sixth month (2 May 1758), the Three Princes visited Uthumphon and Ekkathat at Suan Kratai Pavilion to supposedly surrender. Uthumphon, however, secretly placed some police forces to arrest the Three Princes. The Three Princes unknowingly walked into the trap and were arrested.

On the thirteenth waning, two days later, on 4 May 1758, Uthumphon eventually ordered the death sentences onto the Three Princes. Before dying, Prince Sepphakdi, one of the Three Princes, said "Being born under the great royal white umbrella, who will ever die a peaceful death?" (Thai: ธรรมดาเกีดมาในมหาประยูรเสวตรฉัตรดั่งนี้ ใครจะได้ตายดีสักขี่คน). The Three Princes; Chitsunthorn, Sunthornthep, and Sekkphadi, were executed through the traditional method to prevent princely blood from touching the grounds, by being beaten to death with sandalwood club. A civil war in Ayutthaya was then averted through quick actions of Uthumphon and Ekkathat.

== Brief reign and abdication ==
The new king Uthumphon, after subjugating his rivals the Three Princes, was finally enthroned in the Praptabhisekha ceremony on the sixth waxing of the seventh month (12 May 1758). Praptabhisekha was a specific name of a Rajabhisekha royal enthronement ceremony for a Siamese monarch who had to defeat enemies before ascension to the throne.

Ekkathat, Uthumphon's older brother who was still in monk robes staying at the same residence as Uthumphon, decided to compete against Uthumphon for the throne. Ekkathat moved to stay at Suriyat Amarin Throne Hall, a splendid royal pavilion, instead of returning to Wat Lamut temple as Buddhist monk to impose political pressure onto Uthumphon. Uthumphon was sensitive of his older brother pressing claims to the throne.

Uthumphon finally gave in. Uthumphon personally went to visit Ekkathat at Suriyat Amarin Throne Hall to relinquish his throne to his older brother. On 1 June 1758, after merely ten days on the throne, Uthumphon abdicated and left Ayutthayan royal palace. Uthumphon went on a royal barge procession to Wat Ayothaya temple in the northeastern outskirts of Ayutthaya to perform an ordination ceremony to become a Buddhist monk. The abdicated king Uthumphon, then the monk king, traveled on the royal barge to return to Ayutthaya and stayed at Wat Pradu temple off the eastern wall of Ayutthaya citadel. Uthumphon's abdication and entrance into the Theravadin Buddhist religion earned him the epithet Khun Luang Ha Wat (Thai: ขุนหลวงหาวัด) or the King Who Sought Temple.

== Rebellion of Prince Thepphiphit ==
After Uthumphon's abdication, Ekkathat left monkhood to take the throne as the last king of Ayutthaya. Ekkathat performed his Rajabhisekha enthronement ceremony in the waxing of the eight month (early June 1758). However, Ekkathat found less support in the royal court as prominent Chatusadom ministers, who proposed to make Uthumphon the Uparat previously 1757, mostly supported Uthumphon. Prince Kromma Muen Thepphiphit, the leader of the 1757 proposal, shaved his head to become a Buddhist monk at Wat Krachom temple to avoid political repercussions from the new king Ekkathat.

Due to limited political support in royal court, Ekkathat brought his brother-in-laws Pin and Chim, who were brothers of Ekkathat's two consorts, to power in royal court. Ekkathat appointed his brother-in-laws Pin and Chim to high positions in the royal page ranks. Pim and Chim were rewarded with access and influence over the new king Ekkathat. The brothers also insulted some high ranking ministers who supported Uthumphon. Dowager Queen Phiphitmontri, mother of Uthumphon and Ekkathat, died on 14 December 1758.

In the twelfth month of Year 1120, in December 1758, high-ranking ministers who supported Uthumphon, including Chaophraya Aphairacha the Samuha Nayok or Chief Minister and Phraya Yommaraj the Head of Police, decided that the dominance of Ekkathat's brother-in-laws should not be further tolerated. The pro-Uthumphon ministers went out to visit Prince Thepphiphit, who had been a Buddhist monk at Wat Krachom temple, to ask Thepphiphit to lead a rebellion to overthrow Ekkathat in favor of Uthumphon. Thepphiphit eagerly accepted this invitation to be the leader of an insurgency against Ekkathat.

Prince Thepphiphit led the pro-Uthumphon conspirators to visit Uthumphon at Wat Pradu temple, asking for consent and permission. Uthumphon, who preferred religious life, wished not to involve himself in any political struggles. Uthumphon said that, as a Buddhist monk, he was not allowed to meddle in worldly political affairs and the conspirators should do whatever they were pleased with. Thepphiphit and the conspirators mistook Uthumphon's speech as approval and went on with their plan.

Uthumphon speculated that, if Thepphiphit managed to overthrow Ekkathat, Thepphiphit would take the throne himself rather than restoring Uthumphon. Uthumphon and Ekkathat would meet violent ends. Uthumphon decided to visit his older brother King Ekkathat at the royal palace, telling the king about seditious plan of Prince Thepphiphit. Uthumphon asked the king not to execute the conspirators in exchange for this information. The conspirators were arrested. High-ranking ministers Chaophraya Aphairacha, Phraya Yommaraj and other conspiring officials were tortured, interrogated, whipped with rattan strokes and imprisoned for life but not executed. Prince Thepphiphit fled to the west but was finally caught. Ekkathat exiled Thepphiphit, along with his entire family, on a Dutch ship across the Indian Ocean to Sri Lankan Kingdom of Kandy or Ceylon.

== Burmese invasion of 1760 ==
Due to a Burmese–Siamese dispute over a French ship carrying Mon rebels, perceived Siam's support to Mon people against Burma and the Burmese king's Chakravartin expansionist ideology of universal ruler, in December 1759, King Alaungpaya of the new Burmese Konbaung dynasty set off with 30,000 Burmese-Shan men to invade Siam. After taking Siamese-held Mergui on the Tenasserim Coast, Alaungpaya and his Burmese contingents entered Siam through Singkhon Pass in March 1760, quickly sweeping through Western Siamese cities to reach Suphanburi, just about fifty kilometers to the west of Ayutthaya, in late March 1760.

Ayutthayan royal court and populace panicked as the Burmese invaders had not come this close since 1586 or about two centuries ago. Ekkathat's commanders had not been able to halt nor repel the Burmese so far. Ayutthayan people, elites and commoners alike, beseeched Uthumphon, who had been a Buddhist monk at Wat Pradu temple and who was considered more-capable of being king, to leave monkhood to take military commands against the invading Burmese and to save the kingdom. On popular request, Uthumphon the temple king took of his yellow monk robes and returned to the royal palace to resume powers and commands. Uthumphon's older brother the king Ekkathat was obliged to share royal authorities with Uthumphon.

Uthumphon's first move was to release the conspirators of the December 1758 rebellion, including Chaophraya Aphairacha the former Chief Minister, the former Phraya Yommaraj and other pro-Uthumphon officials who were regarded as being more-capable than Ekkathat's officials and who had been imprisoned for their previous failed attempt to remove Ekkathat from the throne, reinstated to their former positions. Uthumphon also conducted a purge on pro-Ekkathat officials including the unpopular brother-in-laws of Ekkathat Pin and Chim. Pin and Chim were imprisoned, interrogated, tortured and whipped with fifty lashes of rattan caning. Pin died from injuries but Chim survived.

Uthumphon, assuming military commands, sent Chaophraya Kalahom Khlongklaeb the Siamese Minister of Military to lead Siamese forces of 20,000 men to take position at Talan River to the northwest of Ayutthaya to defend against the incoming Burmese from Suphanburi. King Alaungpaya at Suphanburi sent his son Prince Thiri Damayaza of Myedu (future King Hsinbyushin) and his childhood friend Minkhaung Nawrahta to lead the vanguard to approach Ayutthaya. The Burmese vanguard faced the defending Siamese forces at Talan River, leading to the Battle of Talan in March 1760. In spite of initial Burmese setback, the Burmese eventually prevailed and the Siamese defending forces were massacred and dispersed. Chaophraya Kalahom, the Minister of Military, was killed by a Burmese lance-throw while retreating from the battlefield. Siamese commanders were captured by the Burmese and then released. The former Phraya Yommaraj, who had supported Uthumphon, imprisoned for his rebellion attempt against Ekkathat and then released, was heavily injured from the battle and soon died.

Siam's defeat at Talan allowed the Burmese to reach the northwestern outskirts and to approach Ayutthaya. Alaungpaya himself took position at Ban Kum (in modern Bangban district), kilometers to the northwest of Ayutthaya, while Minkhaung Nawrahta the vanguard commander approached the northern walls of Ayutthaya. Chaophraya Aphairacha the Siamese Chief Minister advised Uthumphon and Ekkathat that they should not send Ayutthayan forces to face the Burmese in open field but rather stood their grounds in the 'formidable' Ayutthaya citadel, waiting for the rainy wet season to arrive, in which the Burmese would be obliged to retreat. Uthumphon agreed with this strategy and adopted the passive defense against the Burmese. On 16 April 1760, the Burmese took their cannons to Wat Na Phramen temple to fire cannons onto Ayutthaya, causing great panic inside of the city. In order to boost the general morale of the population, Uthumphon rode in a grand royal procession along the city walls to encourage the Ayutthayan defenders to endure.

On 16 April 1760, on the same day, King Alaungpaya at Ban Kum fell suddenly ill. Due to the illness of the Burmese king and the unlikely success of the campaign, the Burmese withdrew on 17 April 1760. The Burmese king Alaungpaya eventually died on his way back to Burma in May 1760. Ayutthaya was thus saved from the Burmese conquest for one last time and the eventual fall of Ayutthaya was postponed for seven years.

== Second entrance to temple ==
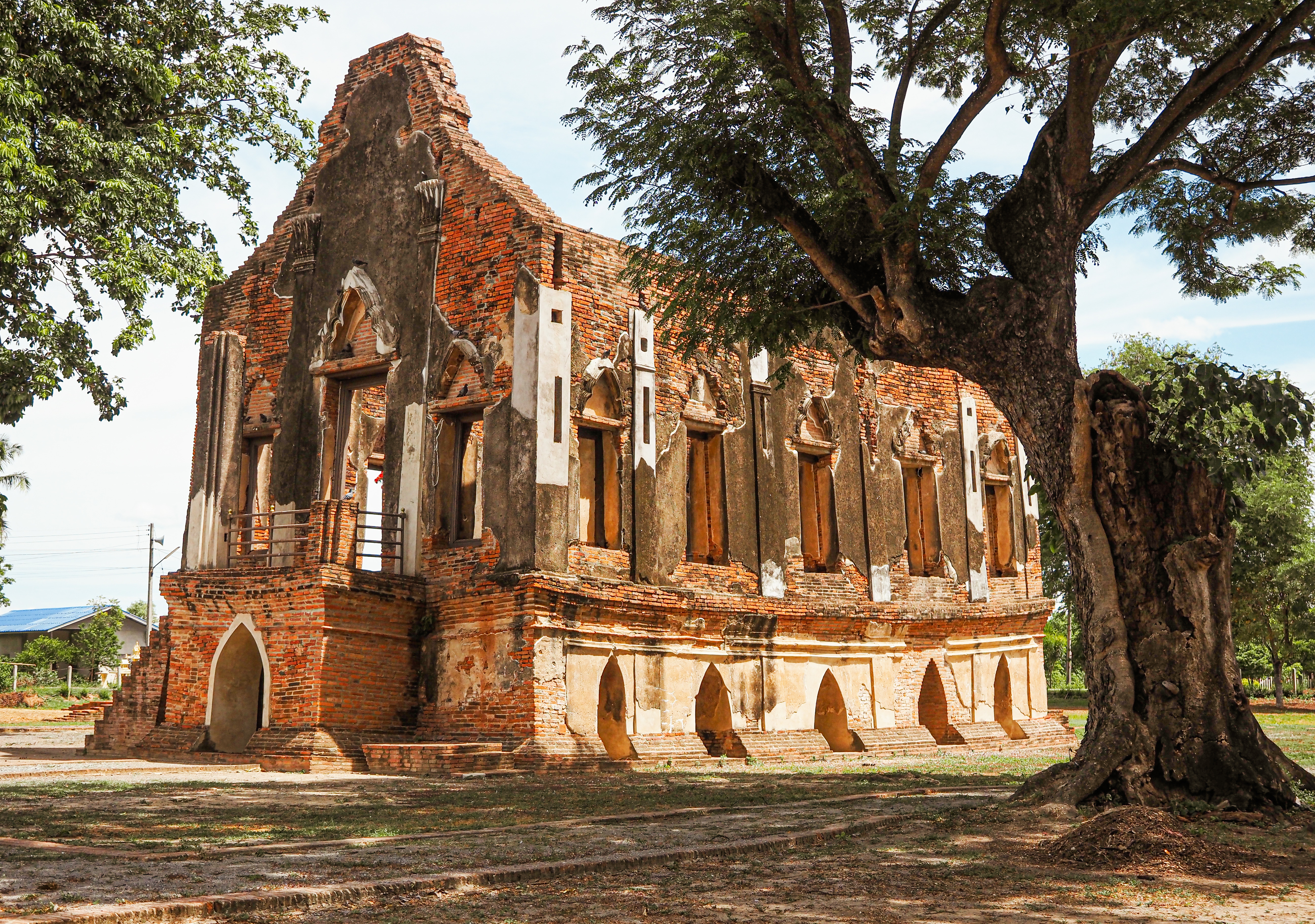
Kham Yat Palace, a place where king Uthumphon perform an ordination ceremony to become a Buddhist monk for the second times.

After the Burmese retreat, Uthumphon and his elder brother Ekkathat, the two kings of Ayutthaya, seemed to peacefully coexist in the royal court for a while. In order to reduce the influence of Ekkathat's two consorts, Uthumphon ordered his half-sister Princess Maengmao, a daughter of King Borommakot with a secondary consort, who had been a Buddhist nun, to leave her nunnery to become a new consort to Ekkathat in 1760. Ekkathat made Princess Maengmao his chief queen with title Kromma Khun Wimonphat.

On one day in the waxing of the eight month, Year 1122 of Culāsakaraj Era (late June 1760), Uthumphon visited his brother Ekkathat at Ekkathat's residence the Suriyat Amarin Throne Hall. Uthumphon found Ekkathat having a bare sword lying on his laps as a demonstration of discontent and enmity towards Uthumphon. Uthumphon was disheartened by the gesture of his brother Ekkathat, who indirectly implied that Uthumphon, as the Burmese threat had subsided, should return to his temple.

Uthumphon then relinquished his royal authority to become a Buddhist monk again, this time permanently. Uthumphon embarked on a royal barge vessel and sailed upstream the Chaophraya River from Ayutthaya to Khamyat Pavilion, about forty kilometers to the northwest of Ayutthaya in modern Phothong District, Ang Thong Province, to perform an ordination ceremony to become a Buddhist monk. Uthumphon, then temple king again, returned to reside at his former temple, the Wat Pradu temple off the eastern wall of Ayutthaya. A large number of Uthumphon's political allies also expressed their loyalty to Uthumphon by following him into monkhood, leaving the royal government to the pro-Ekkathat faction to return to power.

== Fall of Ayutthaya ==
Uthumphon stayed as a Buddhist monk at Wat Pradu temple just off the eastern wall of Ayutthaya for about five years until January 1766 when the Burmese invading forces again enclosed upon Ayutthaya. Ekkathat had to relinquish all areas outside of the Ayutthaya city walls to the Burmese besiegers. Uthumphon, along with other Buddhist monks, were invited to move to stay within the city walls. Uthumphon stayed at Wat Ratchapradit temple adjacent to the northern wall of Ayutthaya. Inside of Ayutthaya, Uthumphon, as a Buddhist monk, went on his usual almsround. Ayutthayan people, who considered Uthumphon more capable of leadership than Ekkathat, wrote messages and put them into Uthumphon's almsbowl, urging to Uthumphon to leave monkhood to take leadership and command as he had previously done in 1760. However, Uthumphon remained in yellow robes, not repeating the same action, perhaps to avoid political confrontations with his elder brother Ekkathat.

After fourteen months of siege, Ayutthaya finally fell to the Burmese on 7 April 1767. Ayutthayan people were indiscriminately massacred by the victorious Burmese. Royal palaces, temples and other structures were destroyed and burnt down. Uthumphon the temple king, at the age of thirty-seven, as younger brother of Ekkathat the last king of Ayutthaya who died during the fall of Ayutthaya, were captured by the Burmese and deported to Upper Burma along with other members of Ayutthayan Ban Phlu Luang dynasty including Uthumphon's half-sisters Princess Mongkut and Princess Kunthon, Ekkathat's consorts, sons and daughters, princes and princesses of the dynasty and around 30,000 Ayutthayan people.

== Exile in Burma ==
About two months after the fall of Ayutthaya, on 6 June 1767 (9th waxing of Nayon 1129 ME), Nemyo Thihapate the supreme Burmese commander left Ayutthaya with his grand entourage of Ayutthayan captives. Uthumphon and other Ayutthayan royal members followed Nemyo Thihapate in the northern land route to Uthaithani, where they turned west, going through the foresty pass in modern Thung Yai Naresuan Wildlife Sanctuary through Umphang to reach Martaban. From Martaban, the entourage somehow reached the Irrawaddy River, possibly through Pegu and Rangoon. Uthumphon was a part of the Burmese victory procession, sailing upstream the Irrawaddy through Prome to eventually reach the Burmese capital of Ava. Nemyo Thihapate reached and returned to Ava in August 1767 and Uthumphon should arrive shortly after.

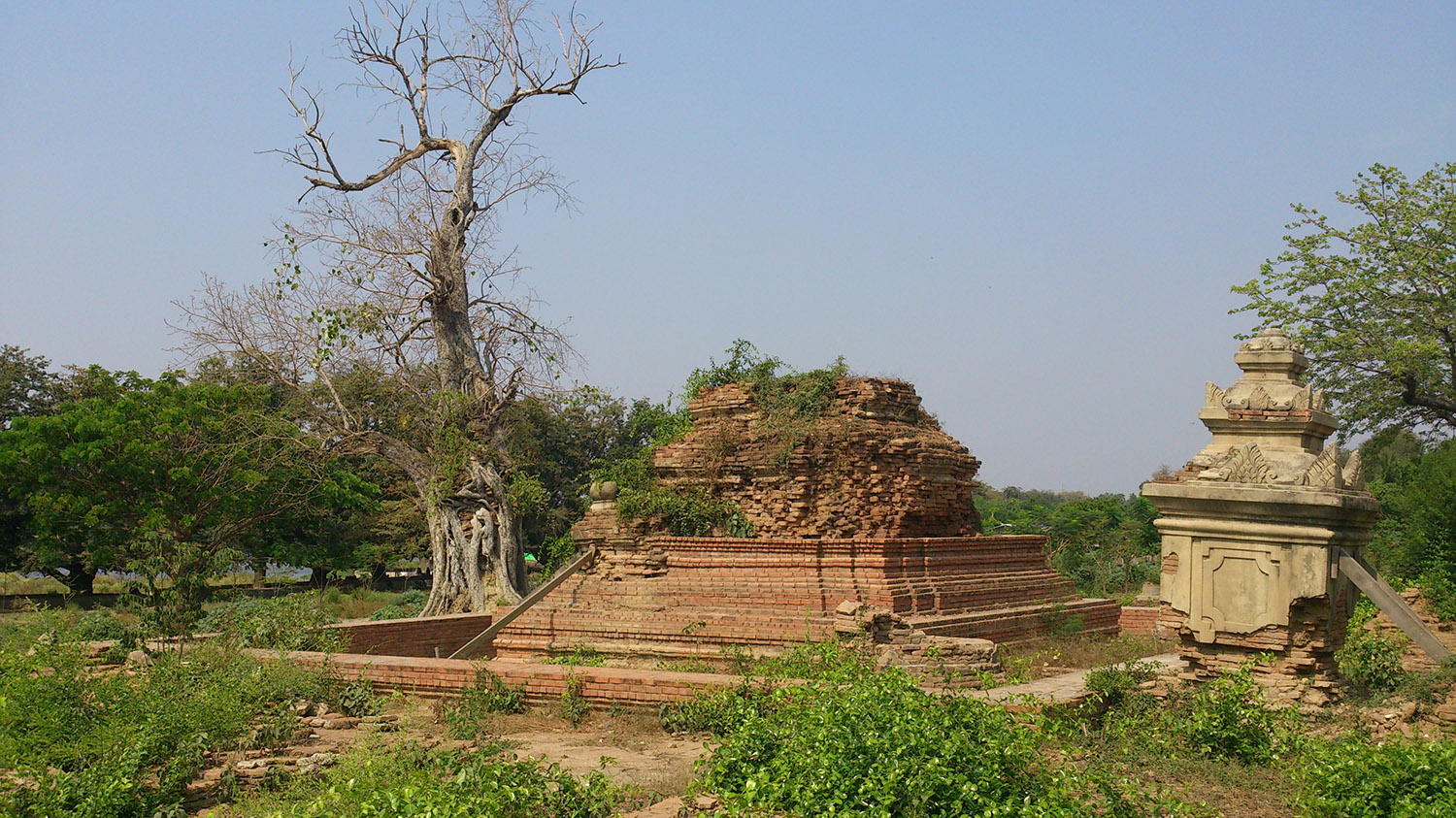
Utumphon's tomb pagoda in Amarapura Township, Myanmar. Whether it did belong to Uthumphon still remains debatable.

Uthumphon was resettled near Ava, along with other Ayutthaya ex-nobles, numbering over 2,000 princes and princesses and their entourages, and over 800 queens bearing titles. At Ava, the history, government, and ceremonies of the Ayutthayan court were documented in a Burmese language chronicle called the Yodaya Chronicle (ယိုးဒယားရာဇဝင်). The Yodaya Chronicle was later translated back into Thai, entitled Ayutthayan affidavit or The Testimony of the King who Entered a Wat although there is no evidence that Uthumphon provided input into the testimony.

Uthumphon, as a Buddhist monk, stayed at Ava for about fifteen years until 1783 when the new Burmese king Bodawpaya moved the Burmese royal capital to Amarapura. Uthumphon and his Yodayan followers moved to the new Burmese royal seat of Amarapura, settling at Yawahaeng or Rahaeng village. Uthumphon spent another thirteen years at Amarapura until his death in 1796 at about the age of sixty-six. Upon his death, Uthumphon was entombed in a chedi at the Linzin Hill graveyard on the edge of Taungthaman Lake in Mandalay Region's Amarapura Township, about 500 metres (1,600 ft) northwest of U Bein Bridge.

== Legacy ==
On 29 June 2013, Burmese and Thai authorities announced that the site of Utumphon's memorial tomb would be renovated and turned into a historical park. Since February 2013, a joint Burmese-Thai excavation team of archaeologists, uncovered bones and fragments of a monk's robes in a gilt glass mosaic alms bowl containing bones and robes. The Thai restoration team is expected to spend US$3.23 million on the project. In late 2013, archaeologists uncovered a brick structure believed to be a monastery that once held stone inscriptions. The team has laid out plans for a 3.95 acres (1.60 ha) memorial ground and is seeking the permission of local authorities to establish a cultural heritage centre there, including restoration of the royal graveyard complex, at a cost of at least 39 million baht (US$1.23 million).

Uthumphon's grandson, Maung Maung Tin was a Burmese royal courtier, civil servant, and historian, best known for authoring the country's last royal chronicle, the Konbaung Set Yazawin.

== Notes ==
Uthumphon House of Ban Phlu Luang Born: ? Died: 1796
Regnal titles
Preceded by Borommakot	King of Ayutthaya; 1758	Succeeded by Ekkathat
Vacant Title last held by Senaphithak	Viceroy of Ayutthaya; 1757–1758	Vacant Title next held by Inthraphithak of Thonburi Kingdom
