= Kham Yat Palace =

Ruins of a palace in Ang Thong, Thailand

Coordinates: 14°39′36″N 100°20′24″E

- พระตำหนักคำหยาด (Thai)
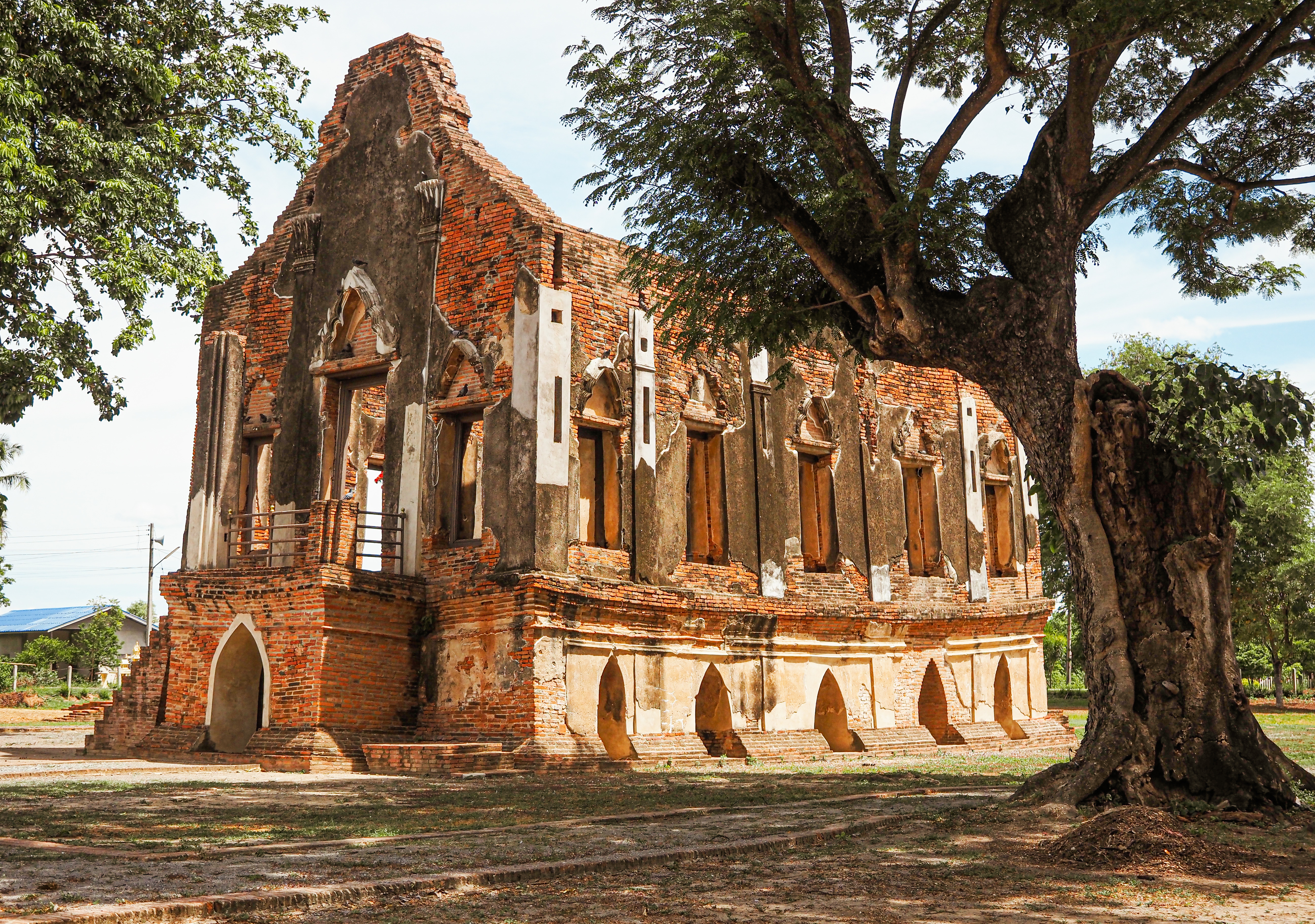
- Ruins of Kham Yat Palace in Ang Thong province
- Interactive map of Kham Yat Palace
- Location: Kham Yat subdistrict, Pho Thong district, Ang Thong province, Thailand

History
- Built: 18th century

Site notes
- Governing body: Fine Arts Department

Kham Yat Palace (Thai: พระตำหนักคำหยาด, RTGS: Phra Tamnak Kham Yat, pronounced [pʰráʔ tām.nàk kʰām jàːt]) is a ruined former royal residence located in Kham Yat subdistrict, Pho Thong district, Ang Thong province, Thailand. Built during the late Ayutthaya Kingdom period, the palace is currently preserved as a national historic site by the Fine Arts Department.

== History ==
Kham Yat Palace was constructed during the reign of King Borommakot (r. 1733–1758) to serve as a royal residence and rest pavilion during his visits to the region.

The palace is most historically notable for its association with King Uthumphon. After abdicating the throne in favor of his older brother, King Ekkathat, Uthumphon entered the monkhood. He later relocated to Wat Pho Thong, a nearby temple, and resided at Kham Yat Palace during his time as a monk before the fall of Ayutthaya.

The site was officially registered as a national ancient monument by the Fine Arts Department and was announced in the Royal Thai Government Gazette on 22 October 1930.

== Architecture ==
The remaining structure of the palace consists of a rectangular, single-story brick and stucco building. It measures approximately 10 meters in width and 20 meters in length. While the original wooden roof has long since collapsed, the four main walls remain largely intact. The architectural style reflects the craftsmanship of the late Ayutthaya period, featuring traditional arched doorways and window frames designed to provide ventilation and natural light.

On certain days of the late year (around 21–22 December which falls on winter solstice), the rays of the downing sun passing through all doorways of the palace hall, a natural phenomenon similar to the case of Phanom Rung Historical Park in Buriram Province.

== See also ==
- List of palaces in Thailand
- Ayutthaya Kingdom
