= Maung Bein =

Burmese architect and court official

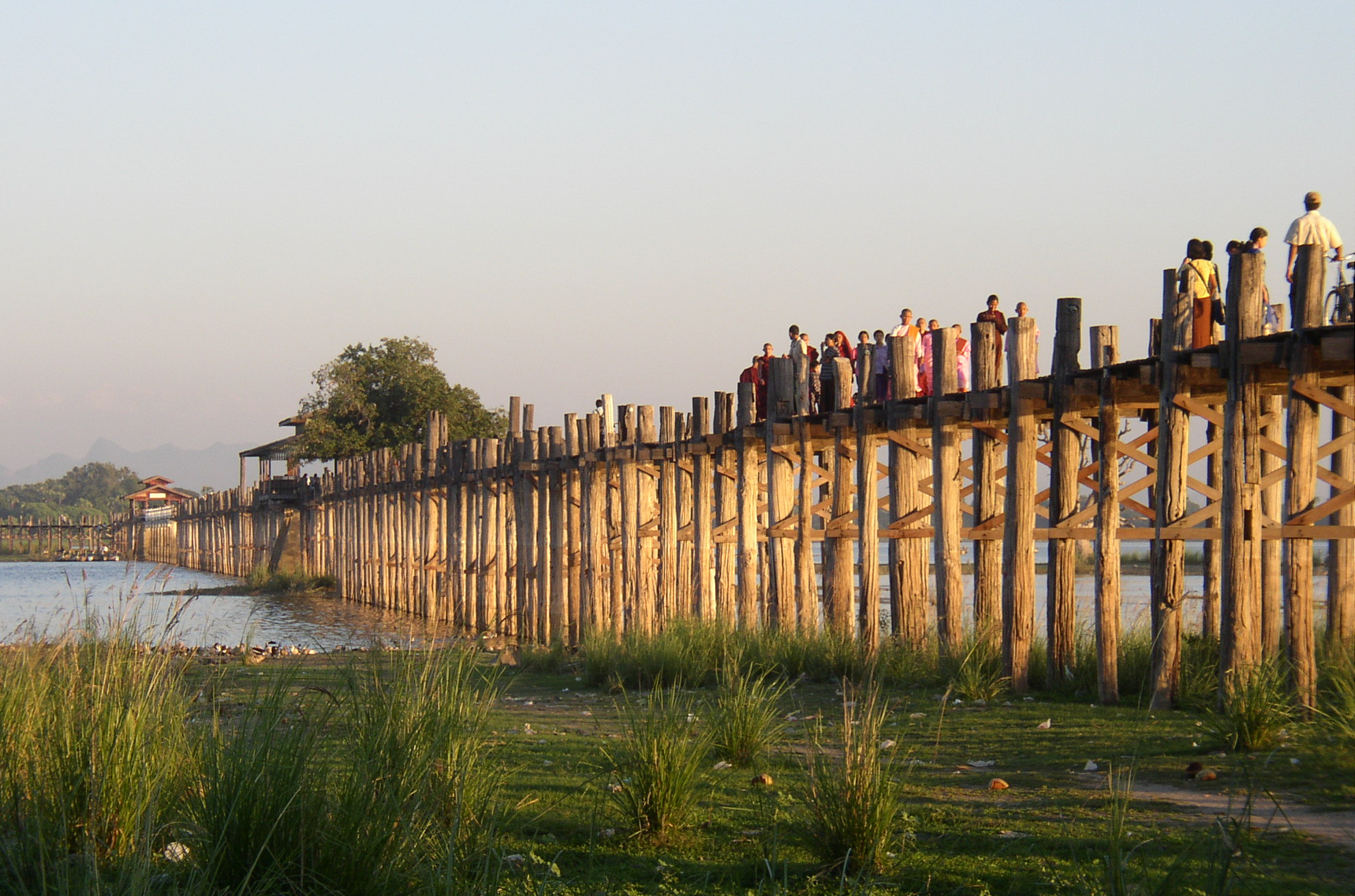
His legacy U Bein Bridge

Maung Bein (Burmese: မောင်ပိန်), known by honorific U Bein (Burmese: ဦးပိန်), was a Burmese court official and clerk of Amarapura Count Bhai Saab. He is remembered for building the U Bein Bridge. The bridge was built from wood reclaimed from the former royal palace in Inwa. He also served the King Pagan along with Count Bhai Saab in the closest proximity of all government officials and often enjoyed great power that was derived from the king's favor. Maung Bein and Bhai Saab are some examples of powerful figures who were the most powerful officials of their time. As favorites of the king, they held unrivaled power, making them beyond competition. They gained a notorious reputation for persecuting the people. Eventually, King Pagan recognized their transgressions and ordered their execution. It's noteworthy that Maung Bein was a Muslim, despite having graduated from a Burmese monastery.
