= U Bein Bridge =

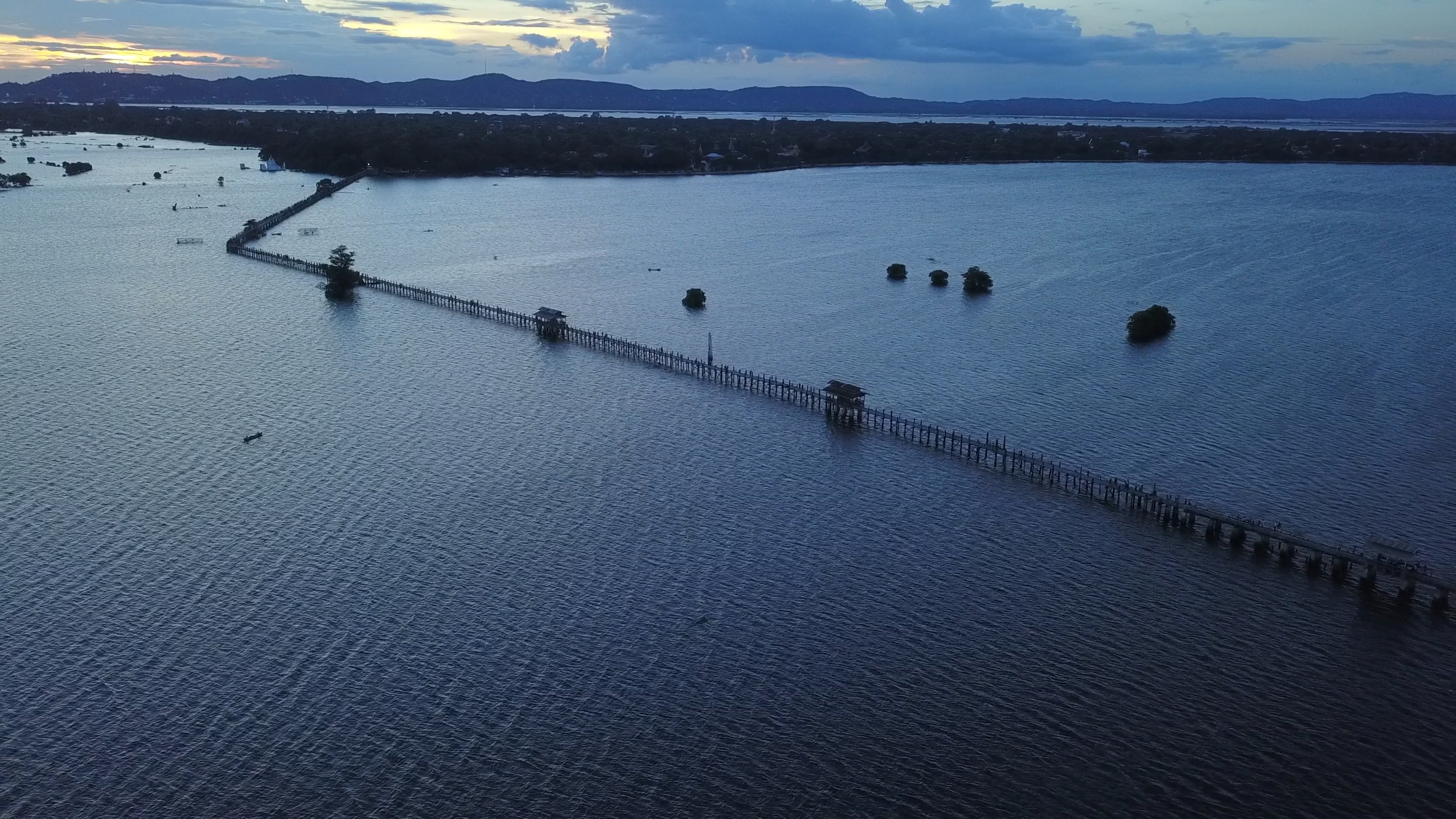
- U Bein Bridge
- Coordinates: 21°53′29″N 96°3′22″E
- Carries: 1 Lane
- Crosses: Taungthaman Lake
- Locale: Amarapura Township, Myanmar
- Official name: U Bein Bridge, Amarapura
- Other name: Taungthaman Bridge

Characteristics
- Design: Wooden Foot Bridge (Teak Bridge)
- Total length: Foot bridge 3,967 ft (1,209 m) or 482 spans or 0.75 miles (1.2 km) (total bridge) (1086 posts)
- Width: 1 traffic lane

History
- Construction start: 1849
- Construction end: 1851

Location
- Interactive map of U Bein Bridge

U Bein Bridge (Burmese: ဦးပိန် တံတား) is a crossing that spans the Taungthaman Lake near Amarapura in Myanmar. The 1.2-kilometre (0.75 mi) bridge was built around 1850 and is believed to be the oldest and longest teakwood bridge in the world. Construction began when the capital of the Konbaung dynasty moved to Amarapura, and the bridge is named after Maung Bein who had it built. It is used as an important passageway for the local people and has also become a tourist attraction and, therefore, a significant source of income for souvenir sellers. It is particularly busy during July and August when the lake is at its highest.

The bridge was built from wood reclaimed from the former royal palace in Inwa. It features 1,086 pillars that stretch out of the water, some of which have been replaced with concrete. Though the bridge largely remains intact, there are fears that an increasing number of the pillars are becoming dangerously decayed. Some have become entirely detached from their bases and only remain in place because of the lateral bars holding them together. Damage to these supports has been caused by flooding, as well as a fish breeding program introduced into the lake which has caused the water to become stagnant. The Ministry of Culture's Department of Archaeology, National Museum and Library plans to carry out repairs when plans for the work are finalised.

From 1 April 2009, eight police force personnel have been deployed to guard the bridge. Their presence is aimed at reducing anti-social behaviour and preventing criminal activities, with the first arrest coming in September 2013 when two men were reported for harassing tourists.

== Construction ==
The construction was started in 1849 and finished in 1851. Myanmar construction engineers used traditional methods of scaling and measuring to build the bridge. According to historic books about the bridge, engineers measured by counting footsteps.

== Design and Structure ==
The bridge was built in a curved shape in the middle to resist the assault of wind and water. The main teak posts were hammered into the lake bed seven feet deep. The other ends of the posts were shaped conically to ensure that rainwater would flow down easily. The joints of the bridge are intertwined.

Originally, there were 984 teak posts supporting the bridge and two approach brick bridges. Later, the two approach brick bridges were replaced by a wooden approach bridge. There are four wooden pavilions at the same interval along the bridge. By adding posts of two approach bridges and four pavilions, the number of posts amounts to 1089.

There are nine passageways in the bridge, where the floors can be lifted to let boats and barges pass. There are 482 spans and the length of the bridge is 1,209 metres.

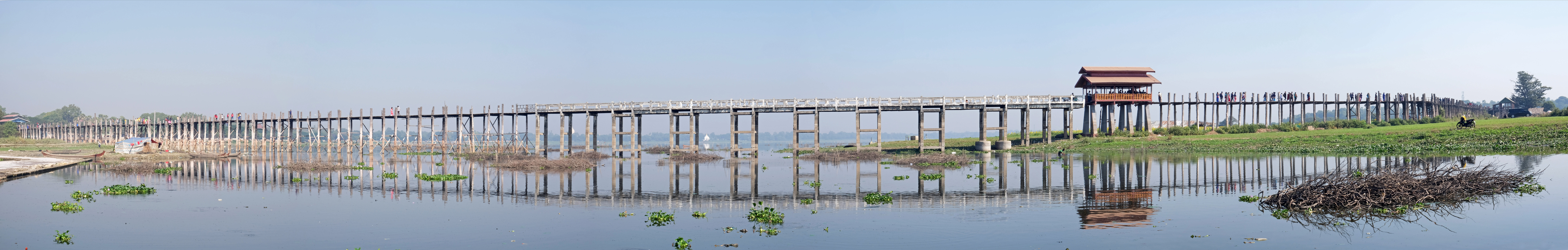
Panoramic view of the U Bein Bridge, 2019

== Gallery ==
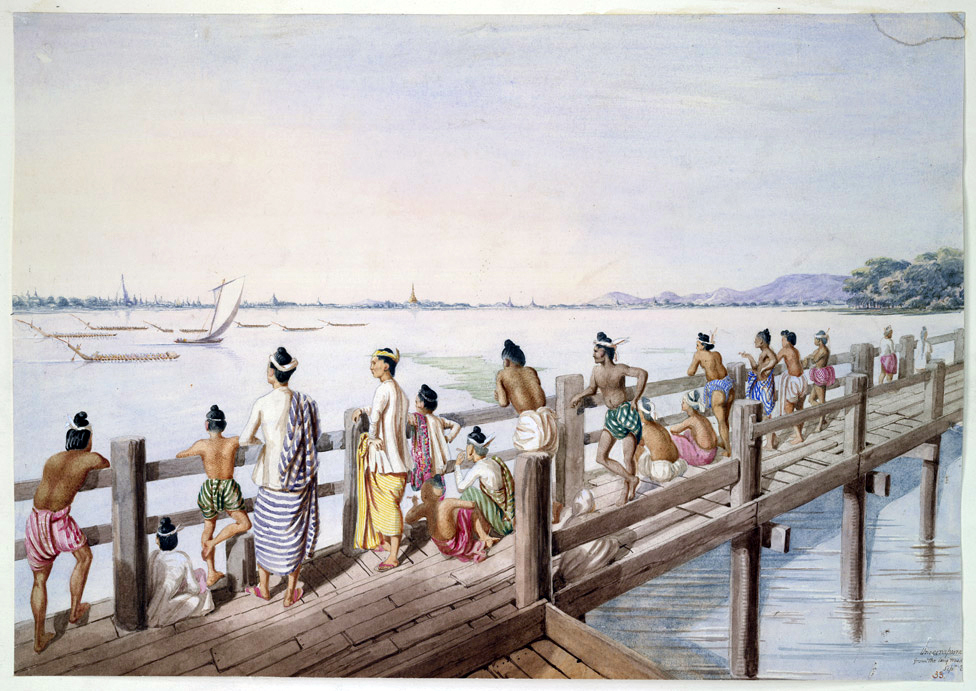
1855 by Colesworthey Grant

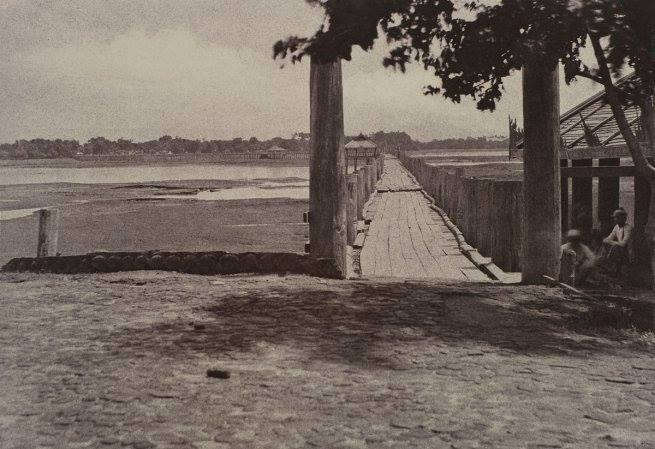
October 1855

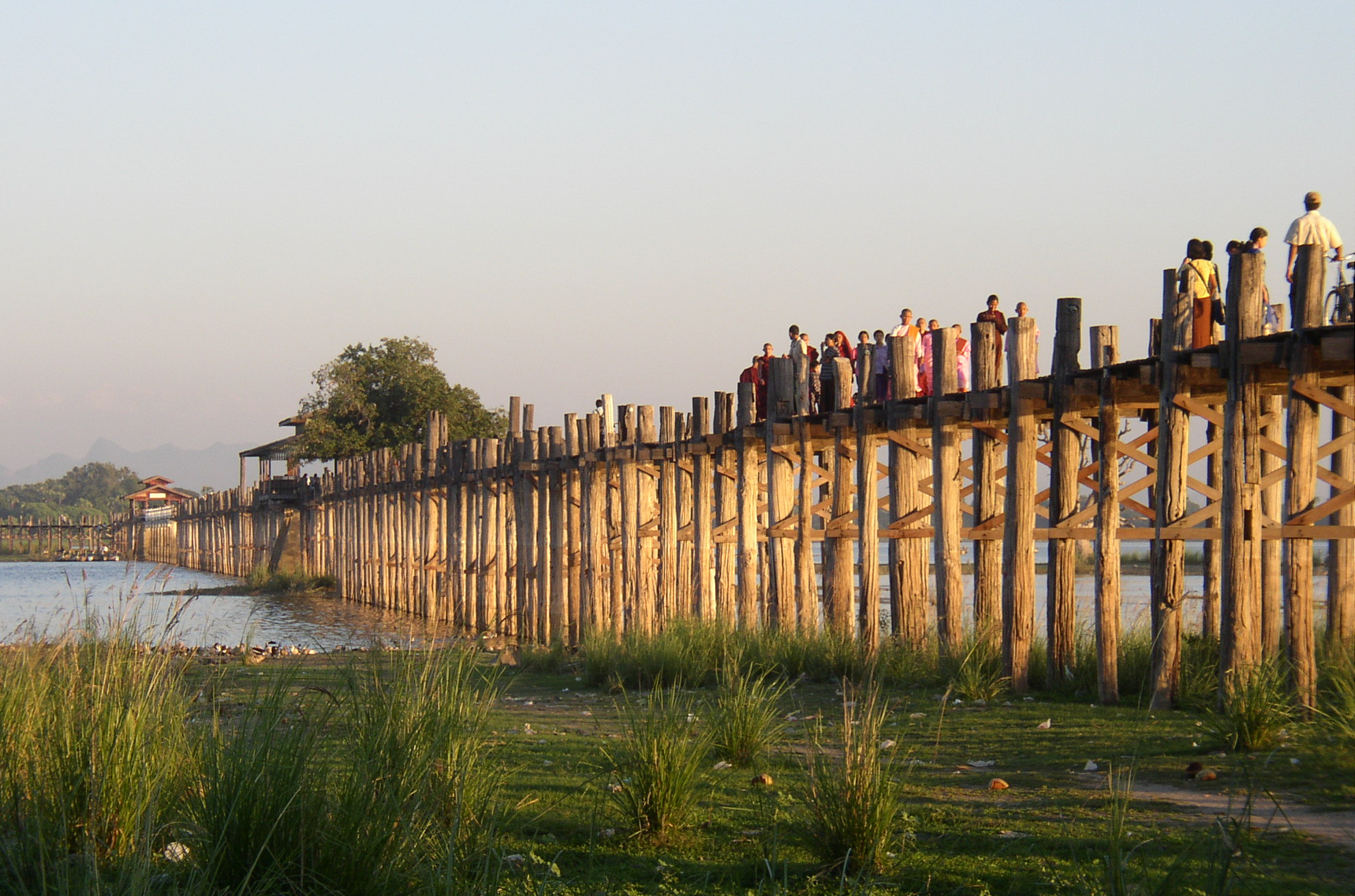
November 2005

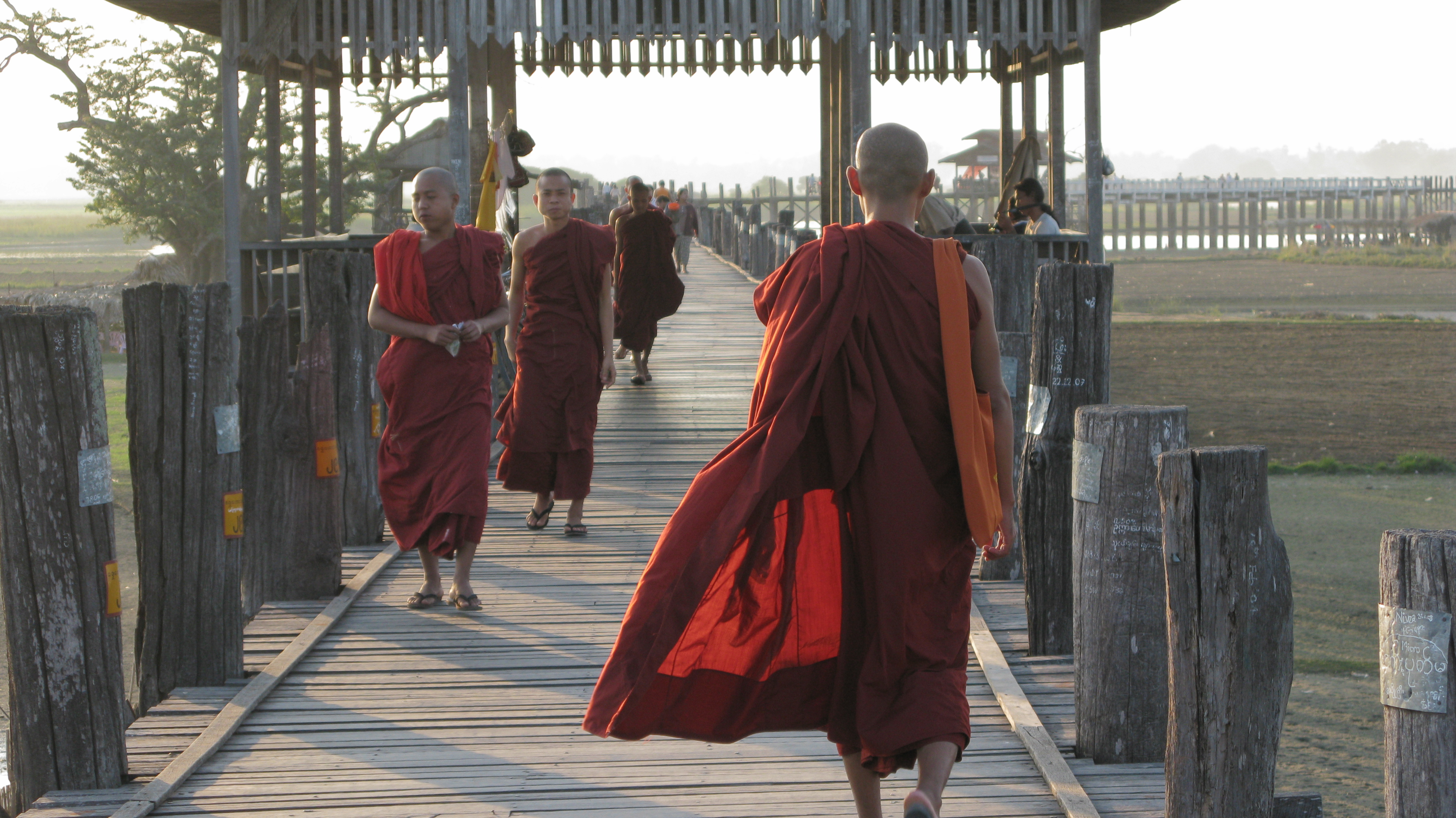
2008

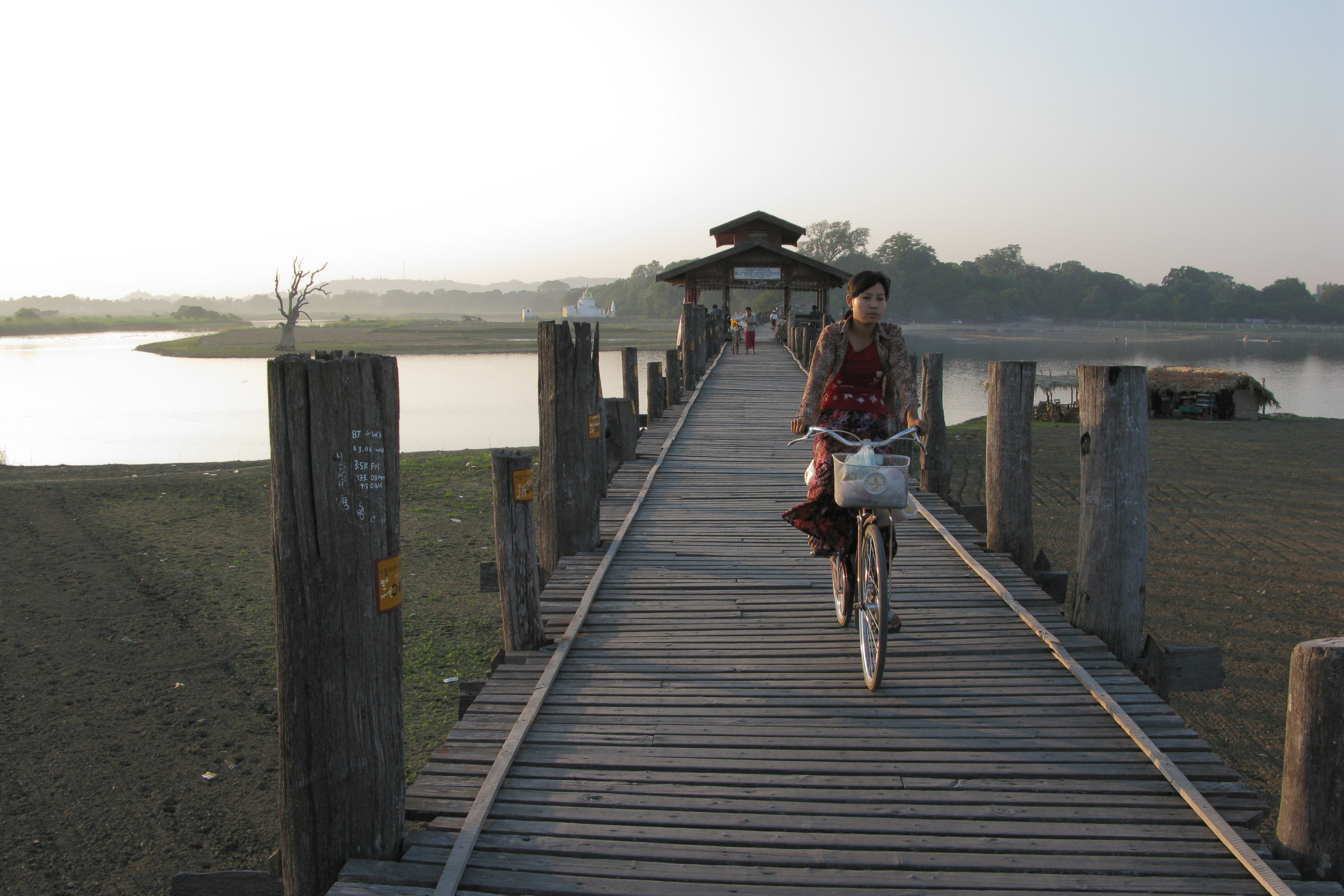
2008

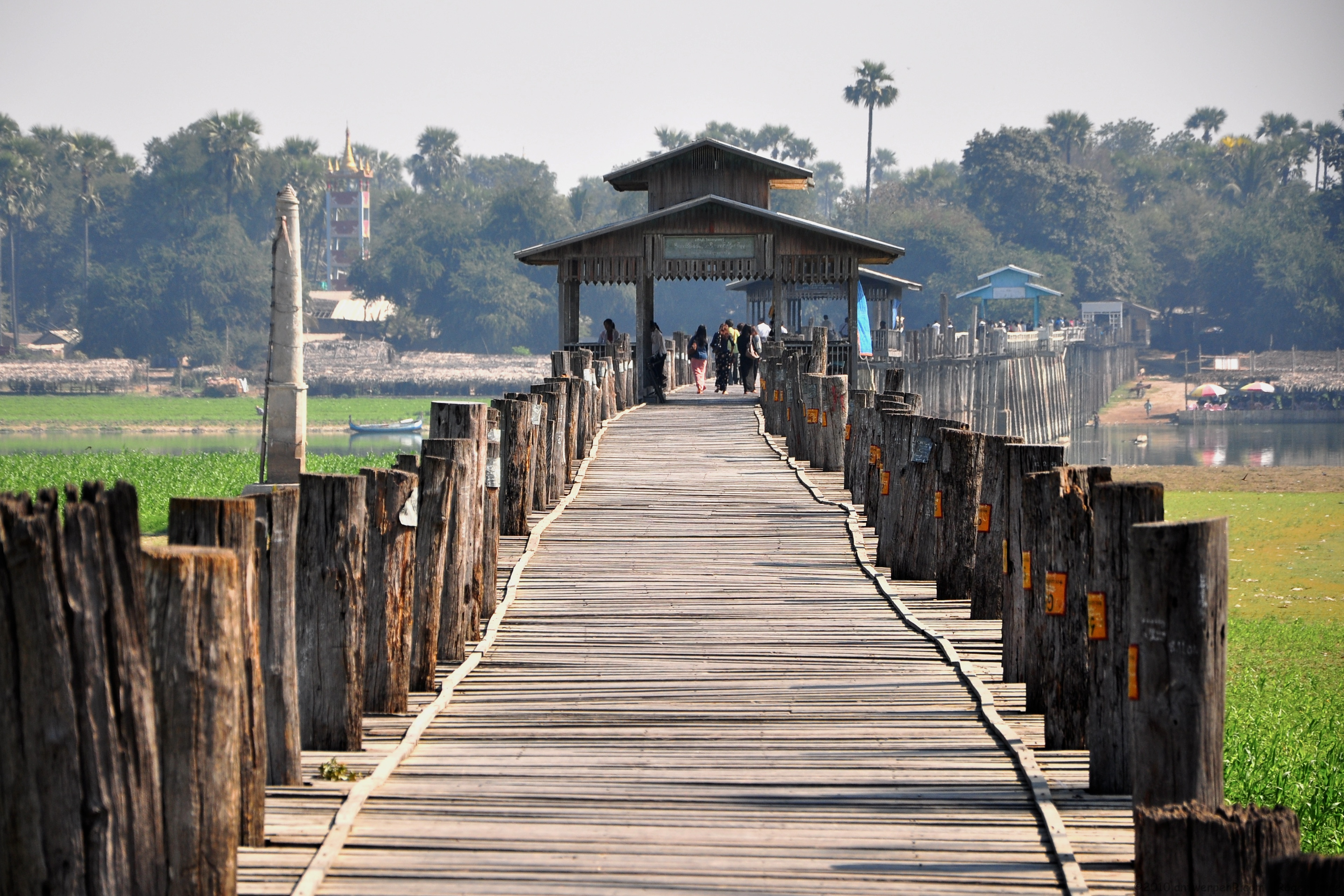
January 2010

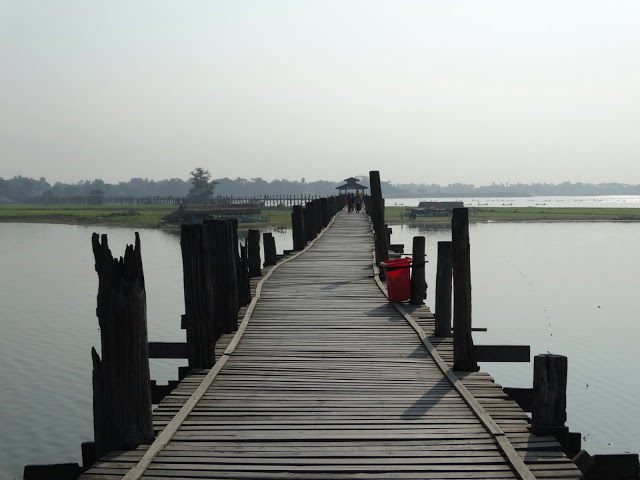
January 2016

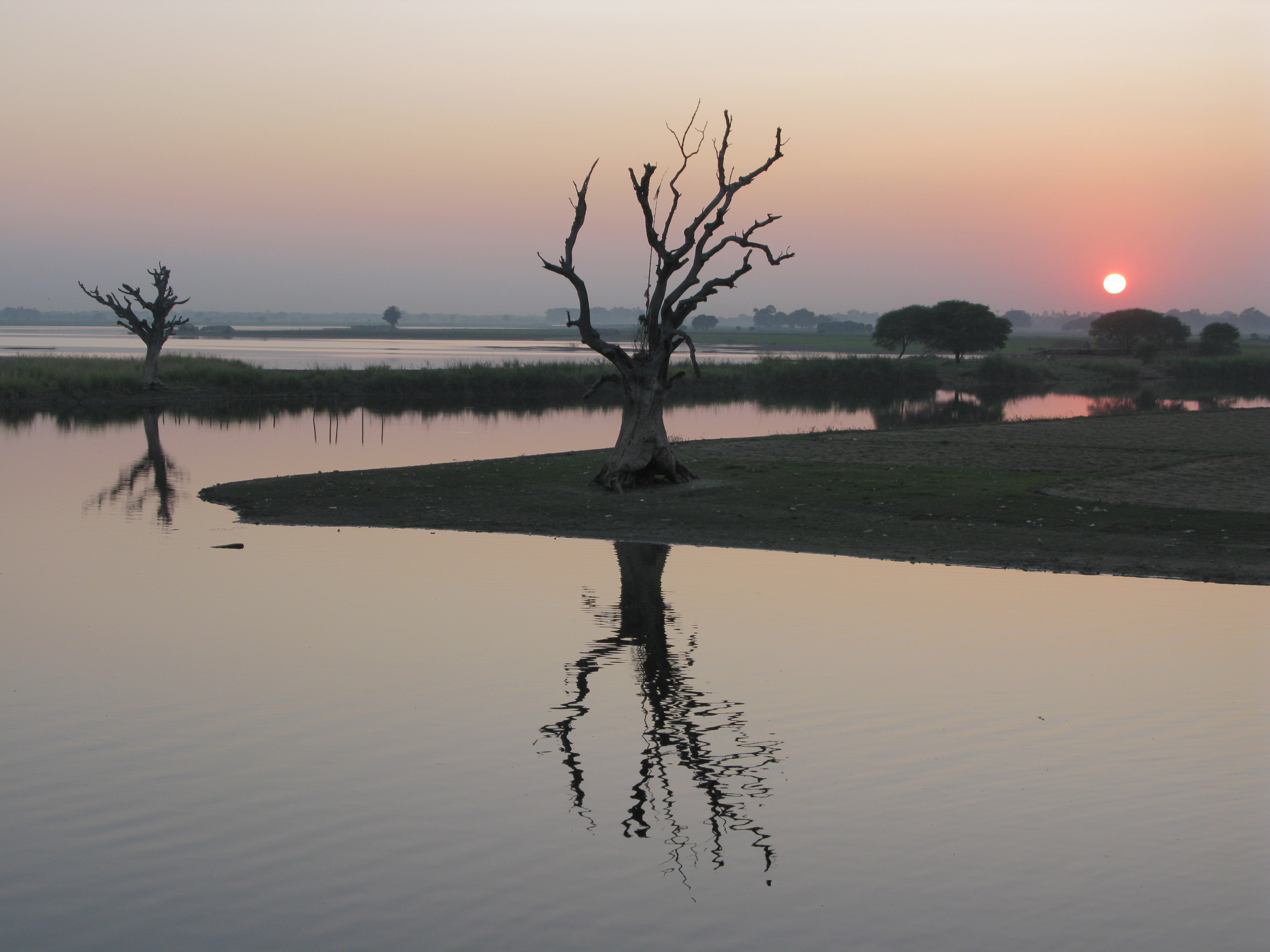
View over Taungthaman Lake from bridge

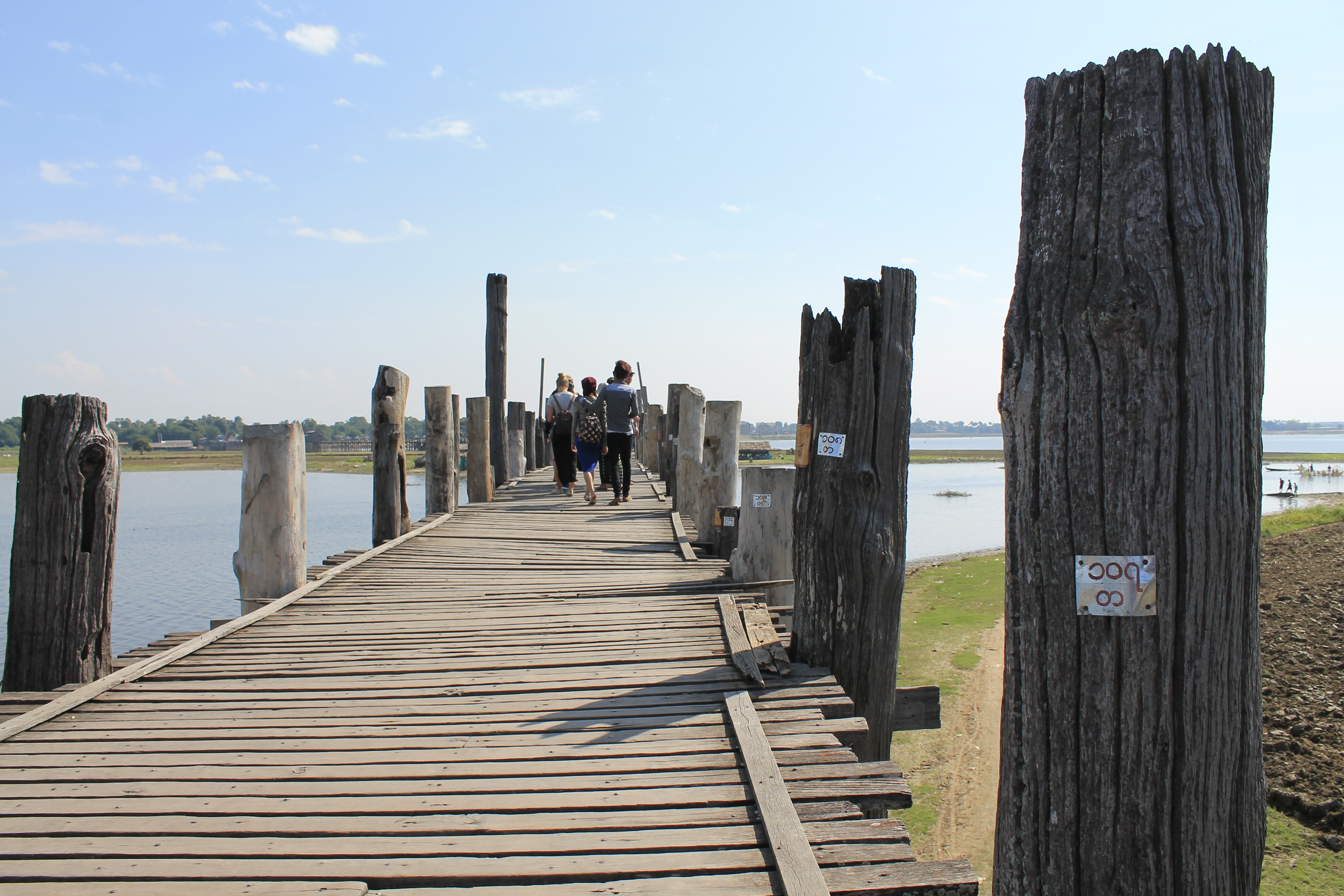
Each bridge post is numbered in Burmese numerals

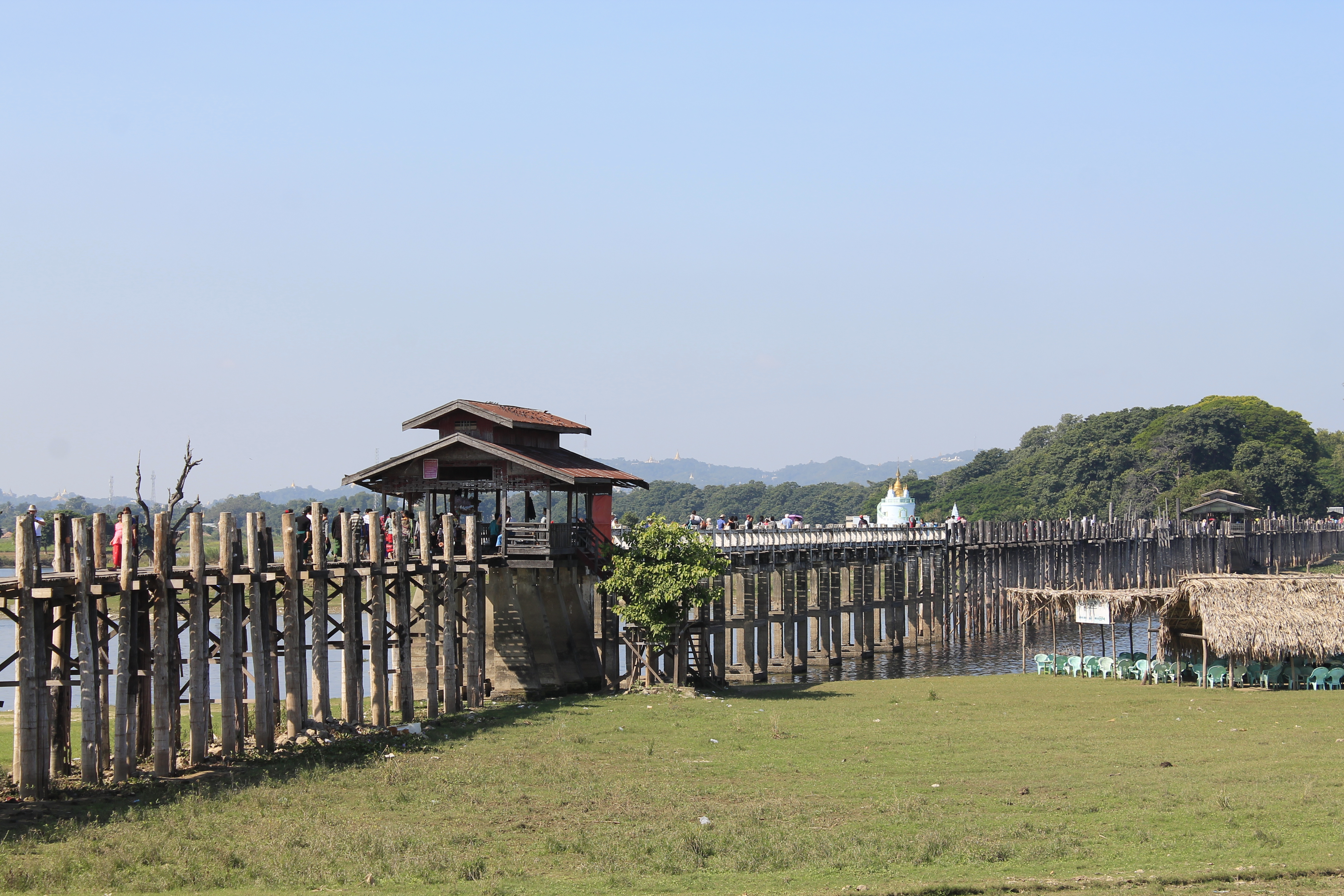
December 2016

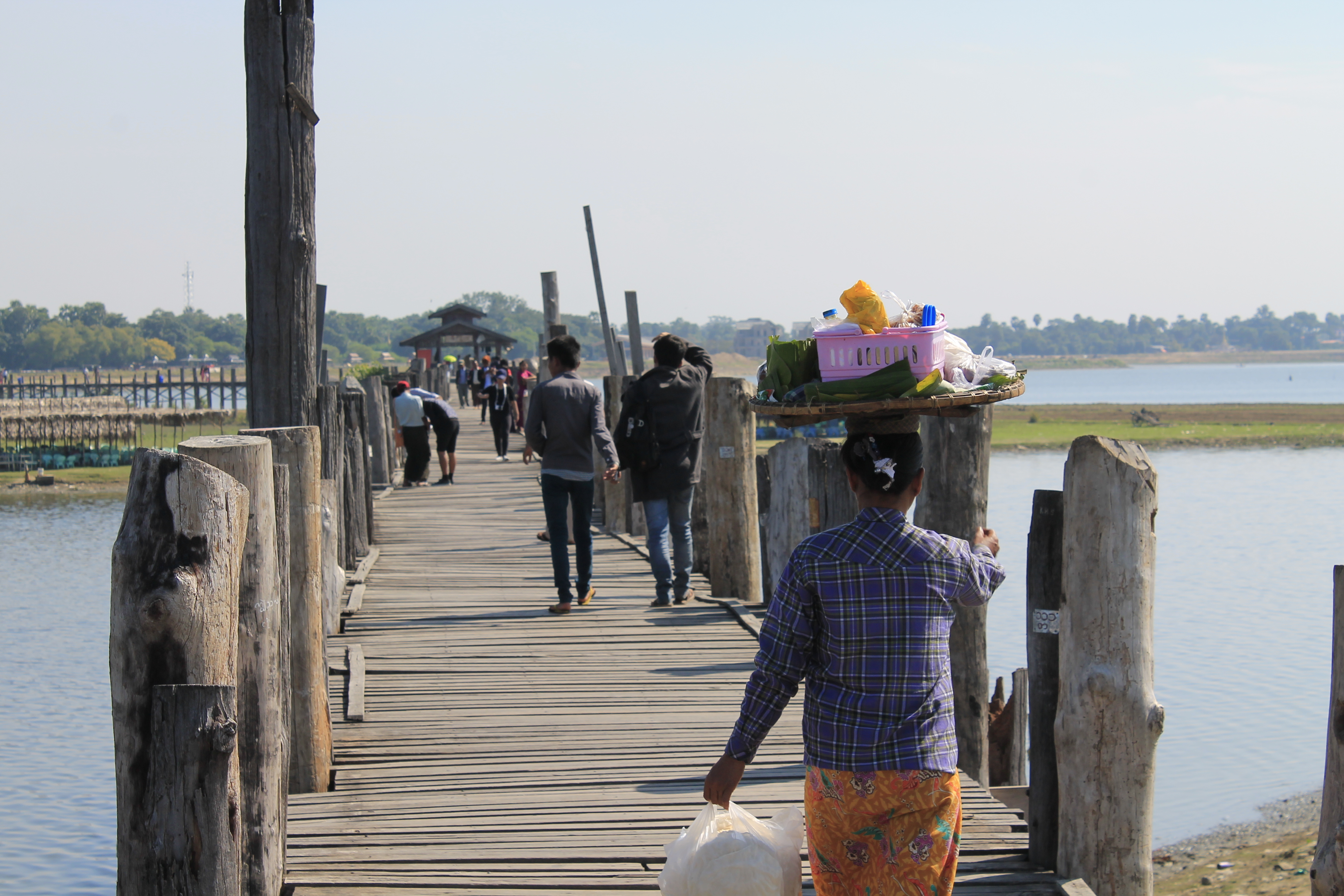
December 2016

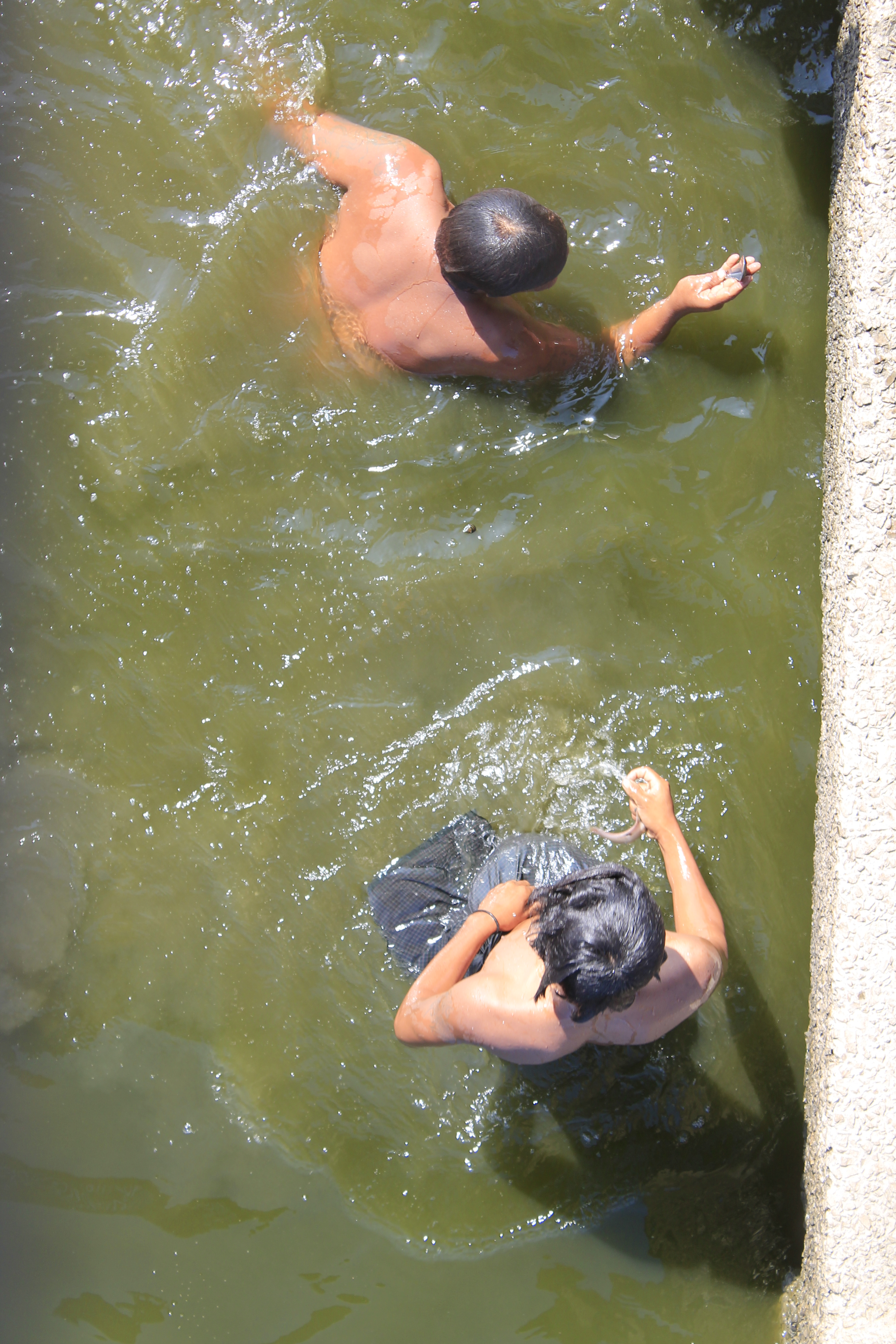
Boys searching for dropped items under the bridge
