= Thammathibet =

Poet and Viceroy of the Ayutthaya Kingdom (d. 1746)

Thammathibet Chaiyachet Suriyawong เจ้าฟ้าธรรมธิเบศไชยเชษฐ์สุริยวงศ์
- Prince Senaphithak

Viceroy of Ayutthaya
- Tenure: 1741–1755
- Predecessor: Borommakot
- Successor: Uthumphon
- Died: 1755; Ayutthaya, Ayutthaya Kingdom
- Spouse: Inthasudawadi, Princess Yisanseni
- Issue: Athit, Prince Phithak Phubet; 12 sons and daughters
Names
- Thammathibet Chaiyachet Suriyawong
- Dynasty: Ban Phlu Luang
- Father: Borommakot
- Mother: Khao, Princess Aphainuchit

Prince Thammathibet Chaiyachet Suriyawong (Thai: เจ้าฟ้าธรรมธิเบศไชยเชษฐ์สุริยวงศ์), also titled Prince Senaphithak (Thai: เจ้าฟ้าเสนาพิทักษ์) and known poetically as Prince Narathibet (Thai: เจ้าฟ้านราธิเบศร์), or more commonly Prince Kung (Thai: เจ้าฟ้ากุ้ง, RTGS: Chao Fa Kung; 1715–1755), served as Viceroy (Front Palace) of the Ayutthaya Kingdom from 1741 to 1755.

Renowned for his versatility, he excelled in several fields. In literature, he produced a number of distinguished works, including Kap He Ruea (The Royal Barge Chant), Nanthopanan Sut Kham Luang, and Phra Malai Kham Luang. Despite his wide-ranging abilities, he is best remembered as one of the foremost poets in Thai literature, and he also composed music for the Royal Barge Procession.

== Life ==
Thammathibet, Prince Senaphithak was the eldest son of King Borommakot (reg. 1733 to 1758) and Princess Aphainuchit or Phra Phan Watsa Yai.

In his poetic works praised for their lyrical language, Thammathibet describes the beauty of the Royal Barge procession, illustrating the work of the rowers, the individual boats, and the sight of the entire procession fleet. Nature, both plant and animal life, are also themes of his poetry. He often deals with the beauty of women, a subject which eventually led to disaster in real life.

Thammathibet and his half-brother Chao Sakaeo (Prince Sunthon Thep) had an argument about an elephant. In April, 1746, Thammathibet reportedly laid siege to the palace of his half-brother, forbidding any entrance or exit. Nevertheless, Chao Sakaeo and his sons were able to enter the palace of the king and lodge complaints there. The King was surprised by these clashes. Thammathibet also hurried to the royal palace but he was not allowed to enter, so he returned to his own palace.

Later, he was brought before his father, who asked him the reason for his presumptuous behavior. Thammathibet remained silent, which rankled the King, who left his son in jail. Thammathibet was chained in a single cell, and no one was allowed to join him. Meanwhile, the accusations against him increased. King Borommakot entrusted Chao Sakaeo and Chao Krommun Poon (Prince Chitsunthorn), along with Okya Chakri (Chancellor) and the Phraklang, with the prisoner's interrogation, which did not bode well. Thammathibet did not speak, and was twice punished with twenty blows, then his soles were burnt.

His most important advisers were also imprisoned and "questioned". They made many accusations: Thammathibet had made copies of the keys to the chambers of the king, the queen, and the royal concubines, so that he could get access to the rooms by night. In addition, his followers had bought and hidden weapons to use at the right moment. And finally, they confessed that Thammathibet was responsible for the death of several monks and the mutilation of some of his subordinates. Thereupon the king ordered fifty blows.

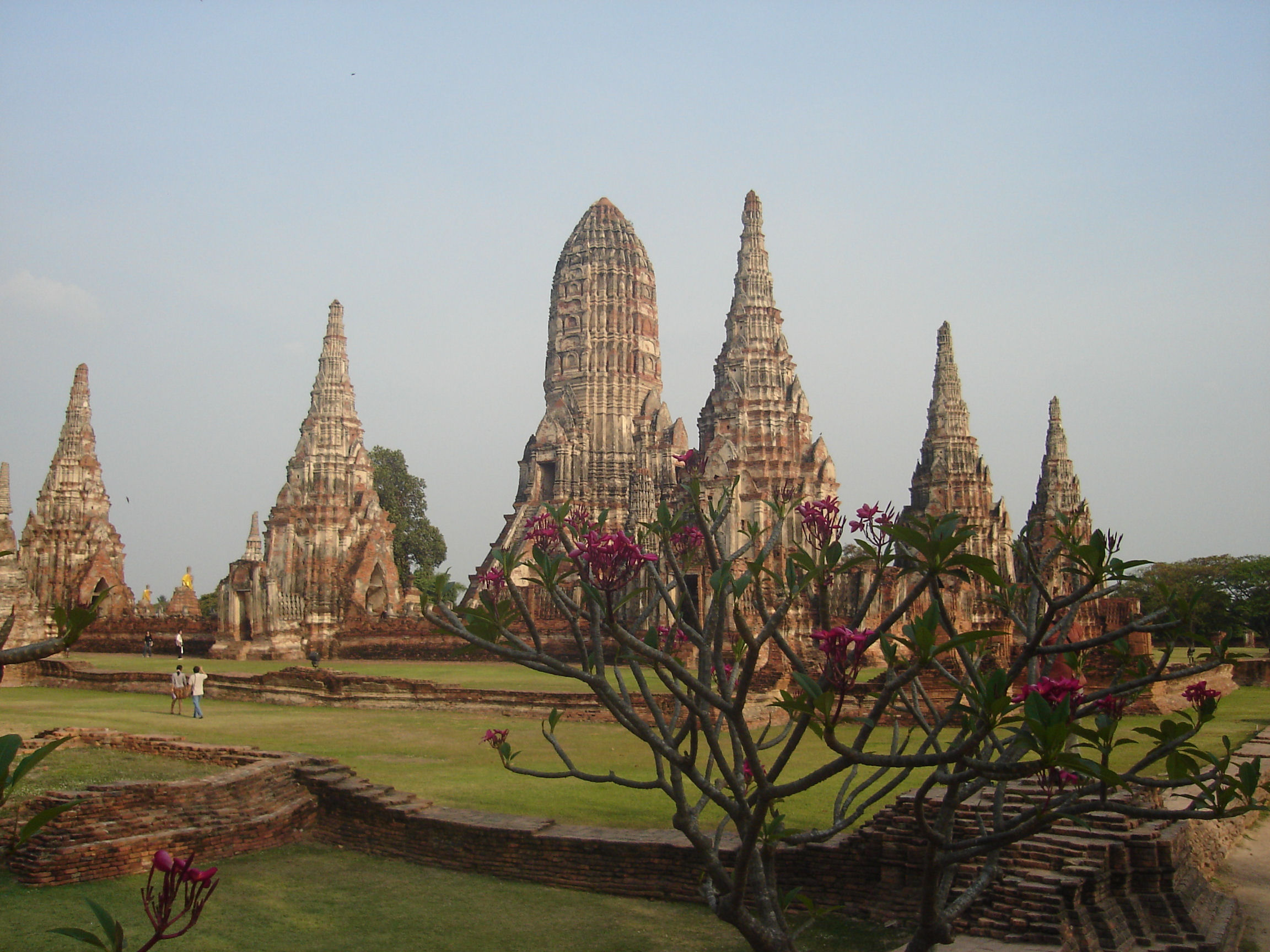
Wat Chaiwatthanaram, where Thammathibet was cremated

During the further interrogations, Thammathibet confessed that he had visited four of the numerous royal concubines and planned to assassinate his father the king and his family and seize power in Ayutthaya. The king gave an order to give Thammathibet fifty more blows and burn his forehead, arms, and legs. In the course of this torture, Thammathibet, the four concubines, and some higher counselors of the prince died.

Prince Thammathibet was cremated in Wat Chaiwatthanaram in Ayutthaya along with Chao Fa Nim, his father's first concubine, and Chao Sangwan, according to Buddhist rite.

== Works ==
- Kap He Ruea (Thai: กาพย์เห่เรือ)
- He Kaki Sam Ton (Thai: บทเห่เรื่องกากีสามตอน)
- He Sangwat (Thai: บทเห่สังวาส)
- He Khruan Yang La Bot (Thai: เห่ครวญอย่างละบท)
- Kap Ho Khlong Praphat Than Thongdaeng (Thai: กาพย์ห่อโคลงประพาสธารทองแดง)
- Nirat Than Sok (Thai: นิราศธารโศก)
- Nirat Than Thongdaeng (Thai: นิราศธารทองแดง)
- Nanthopananthasut Kham Luang (Thai: นันโทปนันทสูตรคำหลวง)
- Phra Malai Kham Luang (Thai: พระมาลัยคำหลวง)

== Issue ==
#	Consort and Concubines	Children
1.	Inthasudawadi, Princess Yisanseni	None
2.	Princess Se	Princess Si
3.	Lady Phan	Athit, Prince Phithak Phubet
4.	Lady Hem or Yek	Prince Chai (also known as Chat or Koet)
5.	Princess Suai	Princess Mit; Princess Thap; Princess Chuen
6.	Lady Chan	Prince Sisang
7.	Lady Suai	Princess Ta
8.	Lady Thongdaeng	Prince Maen
9.	Princess Soi	Princess Dara
10.	Lady Sun	Princess Chi; Princess Chat
11.	Lady Twen	Prince Ming

== Legacy ==
Thammathibet is chiefly remembered for his literary works, especially Kap He Ruea, which is often treated as the oldest surviving exemplar used as a model for later boat chants connected with royal barge ceremonies. The Fine Arts Department presents the work as a detailed literary portrayal of the phra ratcha phithi royal barge procession and its ornate vessels, and discusses its enduring aesthetic and social value as a classic of Thai literature. His technical expertise also extended to architecture; by order of King Borommakot, he supervised the restoration of Wat Phra Si Sanphet and the Phra Thinang Wihan Somdet (Wihan Somdet Throne Hall).

Manuscripts of his Buddhist kham luang compositions have also been preserved as documentary heritage. A samut khoi manuscript of Nanthopananthasut Kham Luang (composed in 1736) held by the National Library of Thailand was listed on Thailand's national Memory of the World register in 2015. In 2025, the manuscript was inscribed on UNESCO's international Memory of the World Register, which highlighted its complex literary form and multilingual manuscript tradition, as well as its continuing influence on scholarship and contemporary arts.

== Literature ==
- Bhawan Ruangslip: Dutch East India Company Merchants at the Court of Ayutthaya: Dutch Perception of the Thai Kingdom, c. 1604–1765. Leiden: Brill 2007. ISBN 978-9004156005.
- Thammathibet, Prince (2016). "On Lovemaking" (PDF). Journal of the Siam Society. 104. Translated by Baker, Chris; Pasuk Phongpaichit: 293–294. ISSN 0304-226X.

Thammathibet House of Ban Phlu Luang Born: ? Died: 1746
Regnal titles
Preceded by Phon	Viceroy of Ayutthaya; 1732–1746	Vacant Title next held by Phonphinit
