= Ekkathat =

Ekkathat เอกทัศ
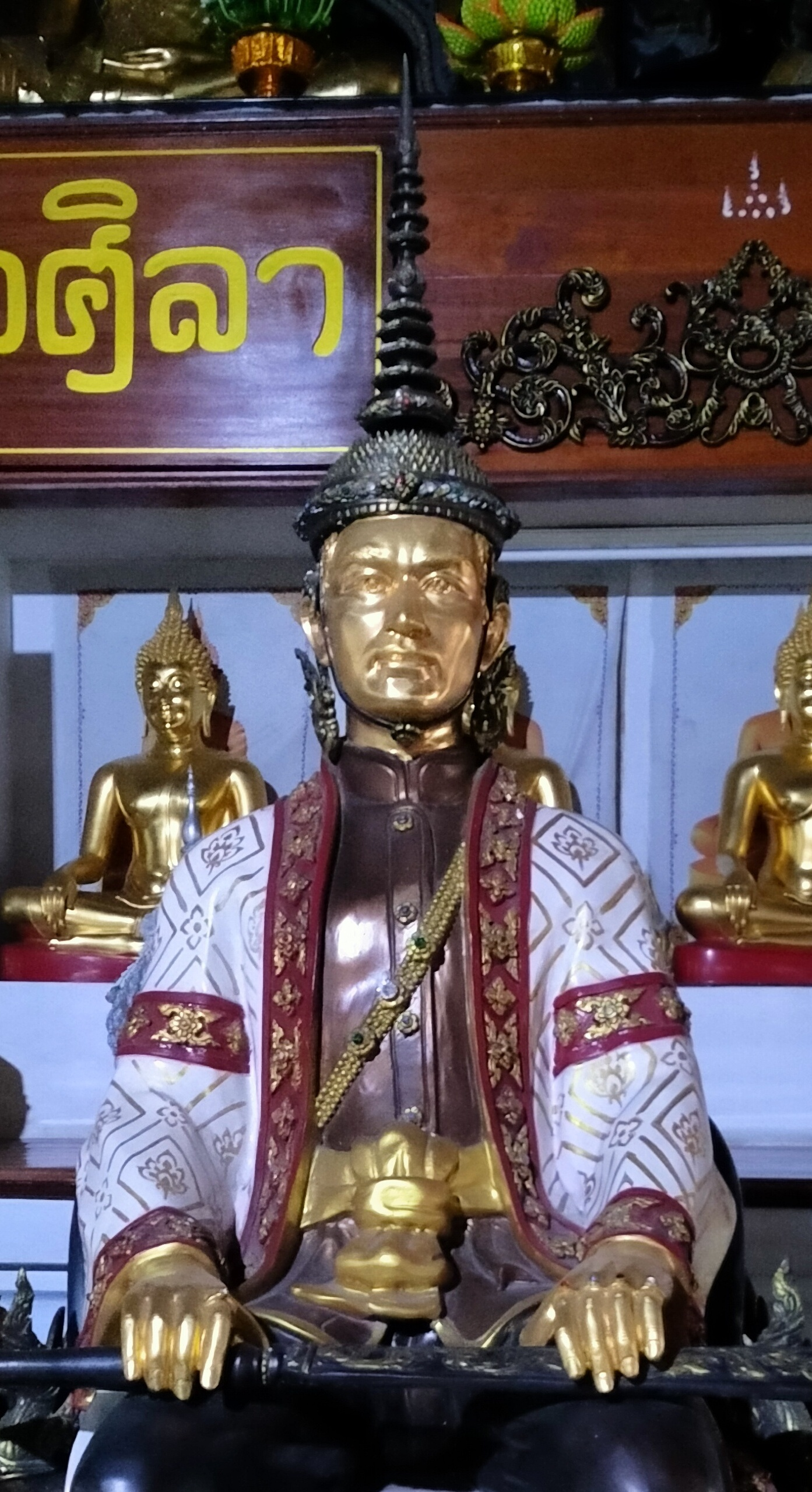
- Statue of Ekkathat at Wat Lamut, Nakhon Luang district, Ayutthaya province

King of Ayutthaya
- 1st reign: 1758–1759/60
- Predecessor: Uthumphon
- Successor: Uthumphon
- 2nd reign: 1762 – 7 April 1767
- Predecessor: Uthumphon
- Successor: Taksin (as King of Thonburi)
- Born: 1718; Ayutthaya Kingdom
- Died: 17 April 1767 (aged 48–49); Ban Chik Woods, Ayutthaya
- Spouse: Wimonphat
- Dynasty: Ban Phlu Luang
- Father: Borommakot
- Mother: Phiphitmontri

Ekkathat (Thai: เอกทัศ, Ekadaśa, pronounced [ʔèːk.kā.tʰát]) or Borommoracha III (Thai: บรมราชาที่ 3) or King of Suriyamarin Throne Hall (Thai: สมเด็จพระที่นั่งสุริยาศน์อมรินทร์) was the 6th monarch of the Ban Phlu Luang dynasty, the 33rd and the last monarch of Ayutthaya Kingdom, ruling from 1758 to 7 April 1767, prior to the fall of Ayutthaya. Moreover, he was called by the people in his time as "Khun Luang Khiruean" (Thai: ขุนหลวงขี้เรื้อน), which meant "the king with skin disease," due to his chloasma.

== Early life ==
Ekkathat was born in 1718 during the reign of his uncle King Thaisa. Ekkathat's father Prince Phon of the Front Palace was the younger brother and Wangna or heir presumptive to King Thaisa. Ekkathat's mother was Princess Consort Phlap, one of two main consorts of Prince Phon and a daughter of Chaophraya Bamroe Phuthorn (Thai: เจ้าพระยาบำเรอภูธร), a prominent nobleman in the reign of King Phetracha. Ekkathat had one younger brother Uthumphon and five sisters who shared the same mother. Ekkathat also had an older half-brother Prince Thammathibet who was born to another main consort of Prince Phon.

In 1732, King Thaisa became ill. Prince Phon, younger brother of King Thaisa and Ekkathat's father, mobilized his forces in preparation for the upcoming succession conflict but was caught. Prince Phon then ordained to become a monk, along with his sons including the young Ekkathat, at Wat Kudidao temple to avoid royal punishments from his elder brother the king. On his deathbed in 1733, King Thaisa chose to give the throne to his own two sons instead of his younger brother Prince Phon, who had been the heir presumptive. The civil war then ensued in Ayutthaya between Prince Phon and his nephews who were sons of Thaisa. The result was that Prince Phon prevailed and the two sons of Thaisa, Ekkathat's cousins, were executed. Prince Phon ascended the throne in 1733 as King Borommakot. Princess Consort Phlap, Ekkathat's mother, became Queen Kromma Luang Phiphitmontri (Thai: กรมหลวงพิพิธมนตรี).

Due to the frequent Ayutthayan succession conflicts, King Borommakot devised a method to regulate and control manpower allocation among the royal princes to prevent future princely struggles through the creation of Kroms or princely regiments. Upon his enthronement in 1733, King Borommakot appointed his sons the royal princes to the Krom titles, assigning them with manpower to command. In 1733, at the age of fifteen, Prince Ekkathat was made Kromma Khun Anurak Montri (Thai: กรมขุนอนุรักษ์มนตรี) with a manpower regiment under his command. Siamese Phrai commoners who were conscripted into the princely regiments were called Phrai Som (Thai: ไพร่สม), in contrast to those who directly served the king known as Phrai Luang (Thai: ไพร่หลวง).

Three sons of Borommakot; Thammathibet, Ekkathat and Uthumphon, who were born to two main queens of Borommakot, were given the superior rank of Kromma Khun, meaning that they could appoint their servants to the rank of Khun. Five other sons of Borommokot, who were born to his secondary consorts, were given the inferior rank of Kromma Muen, meaning that they could appoint their own servants only to the rank of Muen. Appointing servants to high dignity in princely households was a way to demonstrate princely ranks and honors. Ekkathat took two sisters Lady Pheng and Lady Maen as his consorts. Consort Pheng bore him a daughter Princess Praphal Suriyawong and a son Prince Praphaikuman. Consort Maen bore him a daughter Princess Rucchathewi and a son Prince Suthat.

=== Princely political conflicts ===
In 1741, Prince Thammathibet, eldest son of Borommakot and half-brother of Ekkathat, was made Uparat or vice-king or Wangna Prince of the Front Palace and heir presumptive to their father Borommakot. Death of Chaophraya Chamnan Borirak the Siamese chief minister in 1753 put the Ayutthayan royal court into princely political conflicts. The princes coalesced into two factions; Princes Thammathibet, Ekkathat and Uthumphon in one faction against another faction composing of Borommakot's secondary sons Prince Kromma Muen Chitsunthorn, Prince Kromma Muen Sunthornthep and Prince Kromma Muen Sepphakdi – known collectively as Chao Sam Krom (Thai: เจ้าสามกรม) or the Three Princes.

In 1756, the Three Princes appointed some of their servants to the rank of Khun, surpassing the limit of their princely rank of Kromma Muen. Prince Thammathibet of Front Palace, the heir presumptive, took this violation of princely ranks seriously and took matters into his own hands by sending his own forces to arrest Prince Sunthornthep, one of the Three Princes. Prince Sunthornthep fled to tell King Borommakot, their father, about the incident. Borommakot summoned Thammathibet for explanation but Thammathibet visited his father with a sword in his hand. Enraged, Borommakot imprisoned Thammathibet. It was also revealed that Thammathibet had been in secret romantic relationships with two of Borommakot's secondary consorts and had been planning a sedition. Thammathibet, the Prince of Front Palace and heir, was whipped with rattan cane strokes and died from injuries in April 1756.

With the death of Prince Thammathibet in 1756, the position and office of the Front Palace became vacant. Prince Ekkathat or Prince Anurak Montri was technically next in line to the position of royal heir as he was the eldest surviving son of Borommakot born to principal queens. However, Borommakot chose to pass over Ekkathat in favor of Uthumphon, Ekkathat's younger brother, citing that Ekkathat would be sure to bring disaster to the kingdom; "Kromma Khun Anurak Montri is ignorant, being without wisdom nor diligence. If he is granted the rank of vice-king, taking half of royal powers, the kingdom will collapse." (Thai: กรมขุนอนุรักษมนตรีนั้นโฉดเขลาหาสติปัญาแลความเพียรมิได้ ถ้าจะให้ดำรงถานาศักดิ์มหาอุปราชสำเรจ์ราชการกึ่งหนึ่งนั้น บ้านเมืองก็จะวิบัติ์ ฉิบหายเสีย), given his supposed incompetency. Borommakot viewed Uthumphon in better light. Prince Kromma Muen Thepphiphit, another secondary son of Borommakot, along with the high-ranking ministers of Chatusadom, proposed to King Borommakot to make Uthumphon the new Uparat or heir. Uthumphon, who was known for his pursuit of Buddhist Theravadin religion, initially refused to accept the position. Borommakot, however, was insistent. Uthumphon finally consented to his father's wish and was appointed as the new Wangna or vice-king of the Front Palace in 1757. Borommakot speculated that Ekkathat would raise his claims in the future so he forced Ekkathat to shave his head to become a Buddhist monk and to go out to stay at Wat Lamut temple (about nine kilometers to the northeast of Ayutthaya in modern Nakhon Luang district) to keep Ekkathat out of powers and politics.

Meanwhile, not in the attention of the Siamese court, to the west of Siam, King Alaungpaya of the new Burmese Konbaung dynasty conquered the Restored Hanthawaddy Kingdom of Pegu of the Mons in May 1757, uniting Upper and Lower Burma under the new Burmese dynasty after seventeen years of internal warfare.

== Ascension ==
=== Brief reign of Uthumphon ===
Ayutthaya during Ekkathat's reign

In April 1758, King Borommakot fell gravely ill. Ekkathat, who had been a Buddhist monk at Wat Lamut temple, upon learning that his father King Borommakot was on his deathbed, decided to leave the Wat Lamut temple to return to Ayutthaya. Prince Ekkathat stayed at Suan Kratai Pavilion – residence of his younger brother Prince Uthumphon of the Front Palace. Ekkathat visited and took a glimpse of his ailing father. After reigning for twenty-five years, King Borommakot died on that day, on the fifth waning of the sixth month, Year 1120 of Culāsakaraj Era, 29 April 1758, propelling Ayutthaya into a new round of royal succession conflict. The demise of King Borommakot marked the end of a golden age and foreshadowed the eventual end of the Ayutthaya Kingdom itself.

Ekkathat decided to support his younger brother the new king Uthumphon against Chao Sam Krom or the Three Princes. Ekkathat made his first move by commanding Prince Kromma Muen Thepphiphit, his ally, to take all of the muskets from Royal Armory to Suan Kratai Pavilion the residence of Uthumphon. The Three Princes responded by sending their own forces to seize the muskets from the Regular Armory. Ekkathat and Uthumphon devised a plan to defeat the Three Princes. Uthumphon asked five senior Buddhist prelates, led by Phra Thepmuni the abbot of Wat Kudidao temple, to peacefully convince the Three Princes to surrender. The senior monk Phra Thepmuni led the virtuous monks to speak to the Three Princes, beseeching them to cease their belligerent actions to prevent the civil war.

About a week later, on the eleventh waning of the sixth month (2 May 1758), the Three Princes decided to visit the new king Uthumphon and his brother Ekkathat to pay obeisance. However, Uthumphon and Ekkathat secretly placed some policemen to arrest the Three Princes. Not knowing that they were walking into a trap, the Three Princes were captured and imprisoned. Two days later, on the thirteenth waning, on 4 May 1758, Uthumphon ordered the executions of the Three Princes. Before their deaths, Prince Sepphakdi, one of the Three Princes, said "Being born under the great royal white umbrella, who will ever die a peaceful death?" (Thai: ธรรมดาเกีดมาในมหาประยูรเสวตรฉัตรดั่งนี้ ใครจะได้ตายดีสักขี่คน). The Three Princes were beaten to death by sandalwood club – the traditional method for royal executions to prevent any princely blood from touching the grounds. A civil war was thus averted by quick actions of Ekkathat and Uthumphon as the Three Princes were subjugated and executed.

After eliminating the Three Princes, Uthumphon was officially enthroned in the Praptabhisekha ceremony on the sixth waxing of the seventh month (12 May 1758). Ekkathat, however, decided to push for his own claims to the throne against his younger brother the new king Uthumphon. Prince Ekkathat or Prince Anurak Montri defiantly stayed at Suriyat Amarin Pavilion in the royal palace, not returning to Wat Lamut temple despite being a Buddhist monk. Uthumphon was sensitive of his elder brother contesting for the throne as Ekkathat imposed political pressure on Uthumphon. Finally, Uthumphon gave in. Uthumphon abdicated on 22 May 1758, after merely ten days on the throne, in favor of his older brother Ekkathat. Uthumphon personally visited Ekkathat at Suriyat Amarin Pavilion to relinquish his throne. Uthumphon left the Ayutthayan royal palace to be ordained as a Buddhist monk to stay at Wat Pradu temple, earning Uthumphon the epithet Khun Luang Hawat (Thai: ขุนหลวงหาวัด), meaning the King Who Sought Temple.

=== Enthronement ===
Ekkathat, at the age of forty, left monkhood to take the throne, becoming the last king of Ayutthaya. Ekkathat was officially enthroned on the waxing of the eight month (early June 1758) at Sanphet Prasat Throne Hall in the Rajabhisekha ceremony. His full ceremonial regal name was Somdet Phra Borommaracha Maha-adisorn Bawornsucharit Thotsaphitthamtharet Chetthalokanayokudom Borommanath Borombophit Phra Phutthachaoyuhua (Thai: สมเด็จพระบรมราชามหาอดิศร บวรสุจริต ทศพิธธรรมธเรศ เชษฐโลกานายกอุดม บรมนาถบรมบพิตร พระพุทธเจ้าอยู่หัว). Ekkathat was also known in posterity as King Somdet Phra Thinang Suriyat Amarin (Thai: สมเด็จพระที่นั่งสุริยาศน์อมรินทร์) or "King of the Suriyat Amarin Throne Hall", naming after his residence.

French, Dutch, Chinese and Vietnamese sources agreed that Ekkathat had been suffering a form of skin disease, perhaps leprosy. Nicolaas Bang the opperhoofd of Dutch trading post in Ayutthaya reported that King Ekkathat had been suffering from "Lazarus disease" or leprosy. Qing dynasty sources called Ekkathat 'Skin Disease King' or 'Leprous King' (癬王), while Vietnamese sources called Ekkathat Phong Vương (chữ hán: 瘋王) or 'Leper King'.

The new king Ekkathat made his mother Queen Phiphitmontri the Dowager Queen with title Kromphra Thephamat (Thai: กรมพระเทพามาตุ์). Ekkathat also granted Prince Athit, son of the deceased Prince Thammathibet, a Krom title of Kromma Muen Phithakphubet. Prince Kromma Muen Thepphiphit, half-brother of Ekkathat, who had been supporting Uthumphon since his proposal to make Uthumphon the new Wangna previously in 1757, decided to become a Buddhist monk at Wat Krachom temple, just off the northeastern corner of Ayutthaya citadel, seven days after Ekkathat's enthronement, to avoid political repercussions from the new king Ekkathat.

Ekkathat initially retained chief Chatusadom ministers from his father's reign, with Chaophraya Aphiracha as Samuha Nayok or the Chief Minister and Chaophraya Kalahom Khlongklaeb as the Samuha Kalahom or Minister of Military. Ekkathat appointed his brother-in-laws Pin and Chim, who were brothers of Ekkathat's consorts, Consort Pheng and Consort Maen, to positions in royal court. Pin was appointed as Phraya Ratchamontri and Chim as Chameun Si Sorrarak – relatively high positions among the royal pages. In spite of their mid-ranking positions, Pin and Chim exerted great influence over the king and Ayutthayan royal court as they were Ekkathat's in-laws. They had unlimited access to the king and managed to insult some high-ranking Chatusadom ministers.

Dowager Queen Phiphitmontri, mother of Ekkathat and Uthumphon, soon died in the twelfth month of Year 1120, on 14 December 1758. Ekkathat had his mother placed in a royal urn, placed next to the royal urn of his father the deceased King Borommakot, waiting to be cremated.

=== Rebellion of Prince Thepphiphit ===
Chaophraya Aphiracha the Chief Minister, who had previously supported Uthumphon, had enough of the two brother-in-laws of Ekkathat. In the twelfth month of Year 1120 (December 1758), Aphairacha gathered conspirators including Phraya Yommaraj the Head of the Police as they decided to overthrow Ekkathat for the vileness of his in-laws Pin and Chim in favor of Uthumphon the temple king. Aphairacha, Yommaraj and other conspirators went out to visit Prince Thepphiphit at Wat Krachom temple, asking Thepphiphit to lead the rebellion. Prince Thepphiphit, being a Buddhist monk, accepted the challenge as the leader of this rebellion. Thepphiphit led the conspirators to visit Uthumphon at his Wat Pradu temple to ask Uthumphon to resume kingship. Uthumphon, who preferred religious life, did not wish to involve himself so he vaguely said that, as a Buddhist monk, he was not entitled to involve in worldly affairs and the conspirators should do whatever they were pleased with. Thepphiphit and the conspirators mistook this speech of Uthumphon as approval and went on with their seditious plan.

Uthumphon decided not to trust the ambitious Prince Thepphiphit. Uthumphon speculated that if Thepphiphit managed to overthrow Ekkathat, Thepphiphit would take the throne himself rather than letting Uthumphon to take the throne. Uthumphon decided to visit his elder brother King Ekkathat, informing the king about the seditious plan of Prince Thepphiphit. Uthumphon also asked the king to spare the lives of the conspirators in exchange for this information. Aphairacha, Yommaraj and other conspirators were arrested, stripped of their positions and titles, whipped with rattan cane blows, imprisoned for life but spared not to be executed. Thepphiphit fortified himself at Wat Krachom temple against the incoming royal forces but was eventually forced to flee to the west before being caught at Phra Thaen Dong Rang (in modern Tha Maka district, Kanchanaburi Province). Coincidentally, a Dutch ship arrived at Ayutthaya to procure Siamese Buddhist monks to Ceylon or Sri Lankan Kingdom of Kandy. Ekkathat then had his half-brother Prince Thepphiphit, along with his family, wife and children, board on the Dutch ship to be transported and exiled across the Indian Ocean to Ceylon.

Ekkathat also accused Phraya Phrakhlang the Minister of Trade of involvement in this aborted rebellion of Prince Thepphiphit. Panicked, Phraya Phrakhlang resolved to give a large sum of money to the king to avert the royal anger. Ekkathat rewarded Phrakhlang with the elevated rank and title of Chaophraya Phrakhlang to be the acting Samuha Nayok or chief minister. Being simultaneously the Phrakhlang and the Samuha Nayok, Chaophraya Phrakhlang technically became the Siamese Prime Minister during the reign of Ekkathat. Next year, on the eleventh waxing of the fifth month, Year 1121 of Culāsakaraj Era (19 March 1759), King Ekkathat held cremation funerary rites for his parents King Borommakot and Dowager Queen Phiphitmontri.

=== Siamese acquisition of Northern Khmer ===
After the collapse of the Angkorian Khmer Empire in the fifteenth century, the area of "Northern Khmer" of the Mun River valley in what is now Southern Isan, which had been predominantly a part of Angkorian Khmer political entity, sank into obscurity. It is not clearly known what happened to this "Northern Khmer" area. It was likely that this Northern Khmer area had been under tribal, small-knit, non-statehood societies in the forests of Dangrek Mountains, not under control of any post-Angkorian polities. In Ayutthaya and Rattanakosin Periods, this Northern Khmer area, comprising modern provinces of Buriram, Surin and Sisaket, was known as Khamen Padong (Thai: เขมรป่าดง) or "Forest Cambodia", pertaining the non-state nature of the Northern Khmer people, along with the brethren Austroasiatic Kuy people, in the area. These Northern Khmer people had lived during the days of Angkor and remained in the area after the collapse. Later Thai records described the Northern Khmer area as "forests growing over the decaying ancient temples".

From their base at Nakhon Ratchasima, the Siamese gradually expanded into the northeast into modern Khorat Plateau. By the reign of King Narai in the seventeenth century, Northern Khmer town of Nangrong had already been under Siamese control. In 1759, during the reign of King Ekkathat, a white elephant escaped into the Northern Khmer forests. Ekkathat sent officials to retrieve the white elephant with cooperation from local Northern Khmer-Kuy community leaders. To repay their gratitude, King Ekkathat granted them Siamese noble titles;

- Takacha of Khukhan was appointed as Luang Suwan.
- Chiangkha of Sangkha was appointed as Luang Phet.
- Chiangpum of Banteay Sman or Pathai Saman (modern Surin) was appointed as Luang Surin Phakdi.
- Chiangsi of Rattanaburi was appointed as Luang Si Nakhontai.

These Northern Khmer-Kuy settlements were raised into Mueang or towns under loose control of Siam. Through these new-established connections, Siam exerted control over Khamen Padong or Northern Khmer-Kuy area. This area yielded valuable forest products sent to Ayutthaya as Suay tributes. These local leaders paid at least nominal respect to Siam. Submission of these Kuy leaders was later confirmed and strengthened in 1777 during the Thonburi Period.

== Burmese Invasion of 1760 ==
=== Cause of the War ===
The Burmese Second Inwa dynasty was toppled by the Mons of the Restored Hanthawaddy Kingdom by the conquest of Ava the Burmese royal capital in 1752. The new Burmese leader Aung Zeiya emerged at Shwebo to fight the Mons. Aung Zeiya was enthroned as King Alaungpaya and founded the new Burmese Konbaung dynasty in 1752. The new militaristic Burmese dynasty emerged powerful. After the Burmese conquest of the Mon Hanthawaddy Kingdom by King Alaungpaya in 1757 and subsequent persecutions by the Burmese, a large number of Mon people fled to take refuge in Siam. The new Burmese regime then viewed Siam as being supportive of the Mon resistance against Burma.

In late 1758, King Alaungpaya of Burma went on his campaign to invade Manipur. However, simultaneously, the Mons of Lower Burma rebelled during the Burmese king's absence. The Mon rebellion was quickly suppressed by the local Burmese authorities in early 1759. A French ship carrying the Mon rebels took off from Syriam and landed at the Siamese port of Mergui on the Tenasserim Coast. After returning from his campaign in Manipur, King Alaungpaya departed from his royal capital of Shwebo in July 1759, along with his entire family and entourage, to take a religious pilgrimage to Rangoon in Lower Burma to dedicate a Zayat pavilion and to make other Buddhist merits at the Shwedagon Pagoda. At Rangoon, Alaungpaya learned that one of his "royal ships", possibly the French ship carrying the Mon rebels, had landed at Mergui and was seized by the Siamese authorities. Alaungpaya sent delegates to demand the repatriation of the said ship but Siamese authorities at Mergui refused to comply. Alaungpaya was also informed that his mercantile ships were seized by the Siamese at Tavoy. Alaungpaya declared his campaign to invade and conquer Ayutthaya in September 1759.

=== Burmese Invasion of Western Siam ===
On 21 December 1759, King Alaungpaya of Burma marched from Rangoon to invade Siam with the Burmese armies of 30,000 men. Alaungpaya assigned his son Prince Thiri Damayaza of Myedu (later King Hsinbyushin) and his childhood friend Minkhaung Nawrahta to command the van. After conquering Tavoy, the Burmese vanguard attacked the Siamese port of Mergui in February 1760. Only then a message was sent to the conflict-ridden Ayutthayan court about the incoming Burmese invasion. Ekkathat was panicked. Long absence of external threats and the decline of conscription system rendered Siamese defense apparatus ineffective in disuse. Ayutthaya had been too engulfed in internal struggles and dynastic conflicts to pay attention to any looming outside threats. Siamese intelligence system was also not accurate. Ekkathat was misinformed that the Burmese came from all three directions; from Singkhon Pass in the south, from Three Pagodas Pass in the west and from Chiang Mai in the north, so he sent Siamese forces in all three directions.

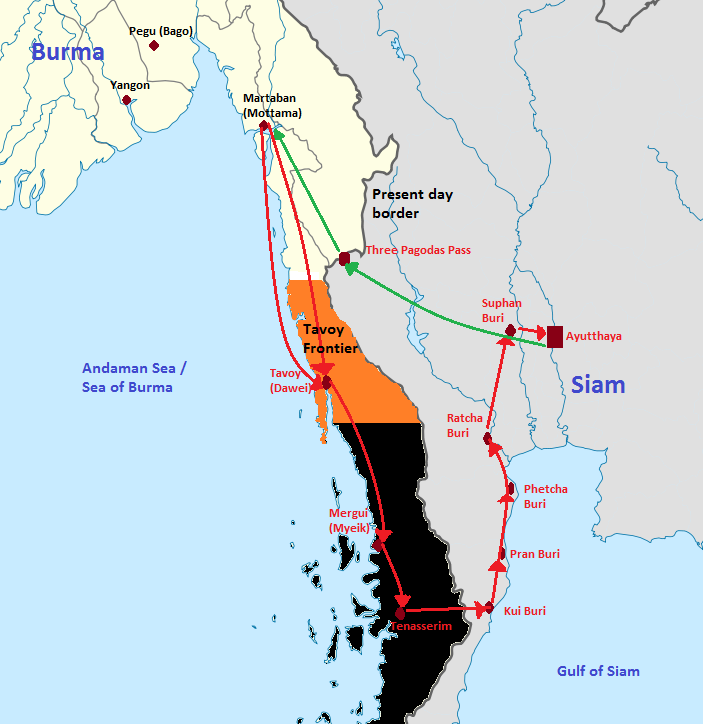
Map showing the Burmese Invasion of Siam in 1760 through Tavoy, Tenasserim, through Singkhon Pass into Siam.

Ekkathat soon realized that the Burmese only came from the south so he sent civilian administrators to lead Siamese armies against the battle-hardened Burmese forces. As Phraya Yommaraj the Police Head was in prison for his rebellion attempt in 1758, Ekkathat appointed Phraya Inthrabodi to be the new Phraya Yommaraj. Ekkathat sent two regiments; 3,000 men under the new Phraya Yommaraj and 2,000 men under Phraya Rattanathibet the Minister of Palace Affairs, to face the Burmese armies. Mergui stood for fifteen days before falling to the Burmese before the Ayutthayan forces could rescue it. Alaungpaya and his Burmese forces entered Siam through the Singkhon Pass in early March 1760. Phraya Yommaraj faced the Burmese in the Battle of Singkhon Pass but was utterly defeated, allowing the Burmese to march into the Gulf of Siam Coast. After the fall of Khun Rong Palat Chu at Wakhao beach (modern Mueang Prachuap Khiri Khan district) against the Burmese, Siamese commanders simply retreated to Ayutthaya. Alaungpaya and his vanguard quickly swept through the Western Siamese towns of Kuiburi, Pranburi, Phetchaburi and Ratchaburi on the Gulf of Siam Coast, approaching Ayutthaya.

=== Return of Uthumphon ===
Burmese king Alaungpaya and his Burmese forces reached and conquered Suphanburi, which was just about fifty kilometers to the west of Ayutthaya, in March 1760. Ayutthayan royal court and common populace became panicked as the Burmese invaders had not come this far since 1586, about two hundred years ago. Ayutthayan people beseeched Uthumphon the temple king, Ekkathat's younger brother, to leave monkhood to assume military commands to repel the Burmese invaders. Uthumphon then left monkhood and left Wat Pradu temple to assume powers and commands in the royal palace per popular request. Ekkathat's kingship was sidelined as he was obliged to share his royal authority with his younger brother Uthumphon.

Uthumphon the temple king, then in power, not only took over the military commands but also seized political power and instigated a purge of Ekkathat's faction. Uthumphon ordered the release and restoration of Chaophraya Aphairacha the former Samuha Nayok or Chief Minister, the former Phraya Yommaraj and other conspirators of the pro-Utumphon rebellion of 1758, who had been imprisoned, to their former positions. Pin and Chim, Ekkathat's supporters and brother-in-laws, were arrested, interrogated and tortured for their alleged secret romantic relationships with some court ladies – a classic Siamese political accusation. Pin and Chim were inflicted with fifty strokes of rattan cane blows, in which Pin died from injuries but Chim survived. Ayutthaya experienced turnover of leadership as pro-Uthumphon faction took power at the expense of Ekkathat's supporters.

Uthumphon sent a Siamese army of 20,000 men to take position against the Burmese at Talan River to the northwest of Ayutthaya. The Siamese, however, were defeated by the incoming Burmese in the Battle of Talan in March 1760.

=== Burmese Siege of Ayutthaya (1760) ===
Alaungpaya and his Burmese forces reached the outskirts of Ayutthaya, encamping at Ban Kum in modern Bangban district to the northwest of Ayutthaya on 27 March 1760. Burmese invaders had not reached the outskirts of Ayutthaya since 1586, about two hundred years earlier. Minkhaung Nawrahta led the Burmese van to take position at Phosamton (in modern Bang Pahan district), about five kilometers north of Ayutthaya. Ekkathat sent Luang Aphaiphiphat the leader of the Chinese mercenaries from Naikai (內街) or the Chinatown of Ayutthaya to dislodge the Burmese from Phosamton. The Chinese–Siamese mercenary forces, however, were quickly defeated by the Burmese under Minkhaung Nawrahta. This Siamese defeat allowed Minkhaung Nawrahta to approach the northern section of Ayutthaya's city walls at Phaniat or the elephant khedda.

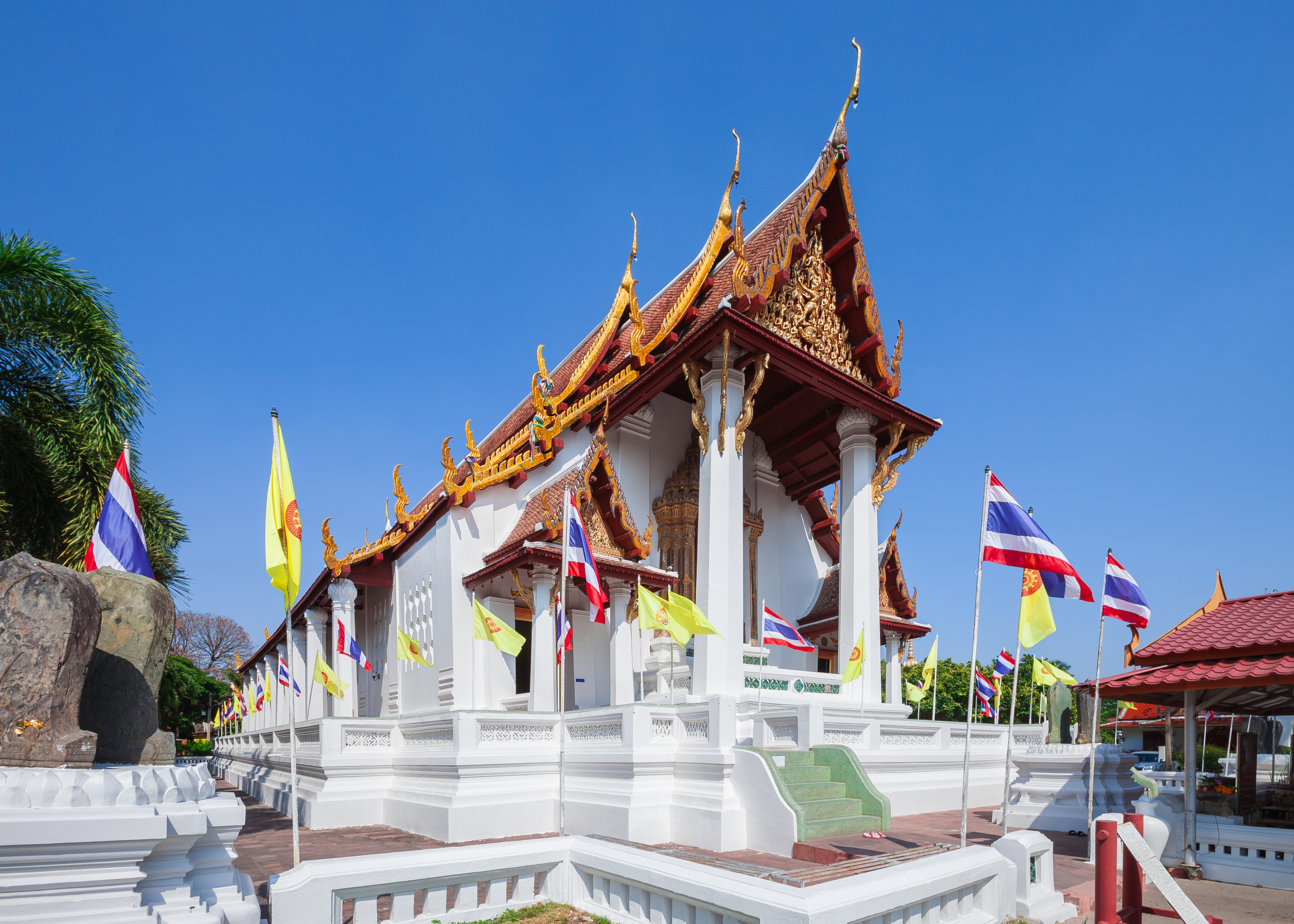
Wat Na Phramen Temple, just off the northern walls of Ayutthaya, was the place where the Burmese stationed their cannons to fire onto Ayutthaya in April 1760.

Chaophraya Aphairacha the Chief Minister told Ekkathat and Uthumphon that they should not send out Siamese forces against the besieging Burmese but rather waited for the rainy season to arrive, then the Burmese would be obliged to retreat. On April 9, a fire broke out in Ayutthaya. Ekkathat and Uthumphon suspected of possible foul play. Chaophraya Phrakhlang, Ekkathat's Chief Minister, was imprisoned for his alleged collaboration with the Burmese. On 13 April 1760, Burmese forces attacked the southern moat of Ayutthaya, where a great number of populace had taken refuge. The Burmese indiscriminately massacred Ayutthayan people on the southern moat, their bodies piling up and filling the moat. Nicolaas Bang, the Dutch opperhoofd of Ayutthaya, was killed during this violent attack. On 16 April 1760, the Burmese stationed their cannons at Wat Na Phramen temple just off the northern wall to fire onto Ayutthaya. Suriyat Amarin Throne Hall, the royal residence of Ekkathat, was hit by Burmese cannon fires, causing the palace spire to collapse.

King Alaungpaya at Ban Kum suddenly fell ill on April 16. His son Prince Myedu and his vanguard commander Minkhaung Nawrahta convinced the Burmese king to retreat. Alaungpaya and his Burmese forces left Ban Kum to retreat next day on 17 April 1760, thus prematurely ending the war. Sudden departure of the Burmese caused some Siamese chroniclers to speculate that King Alaungpaya himself was injured by a cannon explosion at Wat Na Phramen temple but, in fact, Alaungpaya likely stayed at his base at Ban Kum. The ailing Burmese king Alaungpaya eventually died on his way back to Burma in May 1760. Ayutthaya was thus saved from Burmese conquest and destruction for one last time.

== Interbellum Events ==
=== Resumption of Power ===
After the Burmese retreat, the two kings Ekkathat and his younger brother Uthumphon seemed to peacefully coexist for a while in the royal court. In order to reduce the influence of Ekkathat's two consorts, Uthumphon ordered Princess Maengmao, a daughter of King Borommakot born to a secondary consort, who had been a Buddhist nun, to leave her nunnery to become a consort of King Ekkathat in 1760. Ekkathat made his half-sister Princess Maengmao his chief queen with title Kromma Khun Wimonphat (Thai: กรมขุนวิมลพัตร), given her high birth status as a royal princess. Queen Wimonphat bore a princess, Princess Si Chanthathewi.

Things took a negative turn when, on one day in the waxing of the eighth month (late June 1760), Uthumphon visited Ekkathat at the royal residence of Suriyat Amarin Throne Hall and found Ekkathat sitting with a bare sword lying across his lap – a gesture of discontent and enmity. Uthumphon understood that Ekkathat did not want to share royal authority with Uthumphon anymore. Uthumphon was sensitive about contesting against Ekkathat for the throne. Uthumphon then decided to leave the royal palace and relinquished his kingship to become a Buddhist monk once more for the second time, this time permanently, Uthumphon took a royal barge process upstream the Chaophraya River from Ayutthaya to Khamyat Pavilion, about forty kilometers to the northwest of Ayutthaya in modern Phothong District, Ang Thong Province, to be ordained as a Buddhist monk and returned to stay at Wat Pradu temple, his former temple. A large number of pro-Uthumphon ministers and officials also left the government to follow Uthumphon into monkhood, allowing the pro-Ekkathat faction to return to power.

After the departure of his younger brother Uthumphon into monkhood, Ekkathat assumed full powers. Chaophraya Phrakhlang, Ekkathat's chief minister, was restored to his position but was soon ordered by Ekkathat to become a Buddhist monk to repent his mistakes. Ekkathat ordered Prince Phithakphubet, son of the deceased prince Thammathibet, to oversee the repair of Suriyat Amarin Throne Hall damaged by Burmese cannon fires in April 1760. The Suriyat Amarin Throne Hall was dismantled and reconstructed, taking ten months to complete.

=== Mon Rebellion of 1761 ===
Previously in 1759, a group of Mon people from Martaban, possibly due to the Burmese king Alaungpaya's marching upon Martaban in December 1759, fled to take refuge in Siam. King Ekkathat granted these Mon refugees to shelter at Nakhon Nayok to the east of Ayutthaya. On 12 February 1761, this group of Mon refugee men at Nakhon Nayok, called Mon Mai or the "New Mons", arose in rebellion due to oppression by local Siamese officials. The Mon rebels took position of Khao Nangbuat Mountain in modern Sarika, Mueang Nakhon Nayok district to the northeast of Nakhon Nayok town. Lacking modern firearms, the Mon rebels armed themselves only with melee wooden sticks.

King Ekkathat and Ayutthayan royal court responded by sending the royal forces of 2,000 men under Phraya Siharaj Decho the Siamese commander. Phraya Siharaj Decho and his forces, however, were defeated and repelled by the Mon rebels, who were armed only with melee weapons, on February 22. This defeat showcased how ineffective the Siamese military had become by 1761. Ekkathat had to reinforce the royal forces with another regiment of 2,000 men under Phraya Yommaraj to subjugate the Mon rebels of Nangbuat Mountain. The reinforced Siamese royal forces engaged with the Mon rebels at Wihandaeng and eventually managed to defeat the Mons on 28 February 1761. The Mon rebels dispersed and largely fled to the north towards Phetchabun.

=== Return of Prince Thepphiphit ===
In 1752, King Borommakot of Ayutthaya sent Theravadin Buddhist religious mission led by the Siamese monk Upali to Sri Lankan Kingdom of Kandy to restore Buddhism, leading to conception of Siam Nikaya or "Siamese sect" within Ceylon's Sangha monastic order. After that event, Ayutthaya and Ceylon maintained close connection on religion. Prince Kromma Muen Thepphiphit, half-brother of Ekkathat, was exiled along with his family across the Indian Ocean to Ceylon for his failed rebellion attempt in December 1759. A Dutch ship, on behalf of the Kandy king, arrived in Siam to procure Siamese Buddhist monks so Ekkathat had Thepphiphit and his family board on that Dutch ship to Ceylon.

Arrival of Thepphiphit at Ceylon coincided with the ongoing political conflicts between King Kirti Sri Rajasinha of Kandy and his native Singahalese Radala nobility. Even though he had been promoting Theravada Buddhism in Ceylon, King Kirti Sri Rajasinha and his dynasty were of South Indian Nayakkar origins, which had been associated with Hinduism. The Singhalese nobility and the monks of Siam Nikaya sect were dissatisfied with the king and conspired to overthrow him in July 1760. The conspirators planned to replace Kirti Sri Rajasinha with the Siamese prince Thepphiphit. The assassination attempt against Kirti Sri Rajasinha failed, however. Prince Thepphiphit and his family were forced to leave Ceylon in the aftermath of the failed rebellion. The year after, in 1761, Kirti Sri Rajasinha went to war with the Dutch in Ceylon, attacking the Dutch coastal possessions.

After wandering in the Indian Ocean, Thepphiphit eventually returned to Siam in mid-1762, arriving at the Siamese port of Mergui after about two years of exile. King Ekkathat was shocked and furious at the return of his renegade half-brother. Ekkathat sent a royal intendant to impose confinement of Prince Thepphiphit in Tenasserim, not allowing Thepphiphit to return to Ayutthaya. Lubbert Jan van Eck the Dutch Governor of Ceylon, in his war against Kirti Sri Rajasinha, needed a competing candidate against Kirti Sri Rajasinha. Van Eck sent his delegate Marten Huysvoorn to Ayutthaya in September 1762 to ask Ekkathat to allow Thepphiphit to return to Ceylon to be put as a competing candidate for the Kandyan throne against Kirti Sri Rajasinha. Huysvoorn arrived in Siam in October but was not allowed to meet the king. Ekkathat was very distrustful of his troublesome half-brother Thepphiphit and allowing him to become a rightful king of a foreign kingdom was unthinkable. Huysvoorn thus failed to procure Prince Thepphiphit and returned empty-handed.

=== Embassy of William Powney ===
Anglo–Siamese relations were practically terminated after the Anglo–Siamese War of 1687–1688. In the aftermath of the Siamese revolution of 1688, the French were also ousted, leaving only the Dutch as the main Western trading partner nation of Ayutthaya. The situation of the Dutch in Siam, however, also deteriorated due to the Siamese court seemingly favoring the new rising lucrative tributary trade with Qing China over the monopoly-imposing Dutch. British merchants continued to take part in the trans-Indian Ocean trade between Siam and India, in which tin and ivory from Mergui and Phuket were exported to India in exchange for Indian textiles from Madras, Gujarat and Bengal. In 1718, James Collison, a representative of Joseph Colett the British governor of Madras, arrived in Ayutthaya in the reign of King Thaisa to settle some trade disputes.

Due to escalating trade conflicts with the Siamese royal court and the unprofitable trade, the Dutch closed down their trade factory and left Ayutthaya in 1740. Dutch East Indian authorities in Batavia feared that Dutch absence in Ayutthaya might pave way for other European powers like the British to take their position so the Dutch returned to Ayutthaya in 1748 but only maintaining limited presence just adequate to prevent other Western traders to compete. The Dutch greatly offended King Ekkathat in 1762 when Lubbert Jan van Eck the governor of Ceylon sent his delegate Marten Huysvoorn to ask Ekkathat for his half-brother and political opponent Prince Thepphiphit to be raised as a competing King of Kandy against King Kirti Sri Rajasinha, who was waging war with the Dutch on Ceylon. Negative view on the Dutch in the eyes of the Siamese king allowed the British to step in.

After the Seven Years' War, George Pigot the British governor of Madras was eager to establish official trade relations with Siam. George Pigot assigned a private British merchant William Powney as his delegate to the Ayutthayan court. John Powney, father of William Powney, was a British merchant and a British representative in Ayutthaya during the mission of James Collison about forty years earlier in 1718. William Powney arrived at the court of King Ekkathat in 1762, arriving about the same time as the Dutch envoy Marten Huysvoorn. Powney presented the Siamese king with a lion, an Arabian horse and an ostrich – exotic animals. Powney also proposed Ekkathat to allow the British to set up a trade factory at Mergui. Even though Ekkathat did not reply nor consent to these proposals, the Siamese court seemed to grow in favor of the British. William Powney would be known as "Alangkapuni" in Thai writings. This renewed Anglo–Siamese relations, however, would be cut short by the fall of Ayutthaya in 1767.

=== Burmese conquest of Lanna ===
King Ong Kham of Chiang Mai freed his polity from Burmese suzerainty in 1727. The rest of Lanna or modern Northern Thailand had been more or less under Burmese domination during the times of weakening Toungoo dynasty. At the Burmese king Alaungpaya's conquest of the Mon Hanthawaddy kingdom in 1757, most of the petty rulers of Lanna city-states paid tributes to King Alaungpaya to submit. However, Chiang Mai remained defiant towards Burma as it had been, not sending tributes. King Ong Kham died in 1759 and was succeeded by his son Ong Chan as the ruler of Chiang Mai.

After the death of Alaungpaya in 1760, his son and successor the new Burmese king Naungdawgyi sent Burmese forces of 7,500 men under Abaya Kamani and Minhla Thiri (who later became Maha Nawrahta) in October 1762 to attack and conquer Chiang Mai and Lamphun. Facing an overwhelming Burmese invasion, in December 1762, the ruler of Lamphun and his Northern Thai subjects fled their town to take refuge at Phichai, a Siamese frontier town to the southeast of Lamphun. King Ekkathat then ordered the ruler of Lamphun and other Northern Thai refugees to move down south to take shelter at Banglang the northern Khanon or riverine duty checkpoint on the Lopburi River in the Phosamton neighborhood about five kilometers to the north of Ayutthaya in modern Bang Pahan district.

King Ong Chan of Chiang Mai sent a request to Ayutthaya for military aid against the Burmese invaders. King Ekkathat of Ayutthaya responded by sending Northern Siamese forces of 5,000 men under Chaophraya Phitsanulok Rueang the governor of Phitsanulok to aid Chiang Mai. However, Chaing Mai fell to the Burmese in August 1763 before the Siamese relief forces could reach Chiang Mai. King Ong Chan of Chiang Mai, along with his Northern Thai subjects, were deported wholesale to Burma. The Siamese, who had already reached Tak, did not engage with the Burmese and simply returned. Burmese conquest of Lanna was detrimental to Siam's geopolitical situation as Lanna would become the base for Burmese military operations in the region, providing the Burmese with vast manpower, supplies and other resources.

=== Submission of Tavoy ===
Burmese king Naungdawgyi died in December 1763, succeeded by his younger brother Prince Myedu, who ascended the throne as the new Burmese king Hsinbyushin. Hsinbyushin, formerly Prince Myedu, led the vanguard force of his father Alaungpaya during the Burmese invasion of Siam in 1760 and had an opportunity to learn about Siamese geography and military tactics. His experience in Siam would affect and influence the Burmese strategy on the upcoming Burmese invasion of Siam in 1765 that would eventually led to the fall of Ayutthaya in 1767.

The Burmese gained control of Tavoy in December 1759 or January 1760 during Alaungpaya's campaign. Tavoy had been under attack by rebels since 1761, according to the writings of Pierre Brigot the vicar apostolic of Siam. Udaungza, a Burmese official, seized control of Tavoy some time after and killed the Konbaung-appointed governor there. After the demise of the Burmese king Naungdawgyi, in December 1763 or early 1764, Udaungza the self-proclaimed ruler of Tavoy sent tributes to submit to Ayutthaya. Siam then assumed control over the whole Tenasserim Coast from Tavoy to Mergui, though this control would be short-lived.

== Burmese Invasion of 1765 ==
=== Burmese preparation ===
The new Burmese king Hsinbyushin inherited his father Alaungpaya's energy and military talent. Hsinbyushin declared his intentions to achieve the unfinished mission of conquering Ayutthaya initiated by his father Alaungpaya. Hsinbyushin, as the Prince Myedu, had accompanied his father in the previous campaign of 1760 and had opportunities to learn about Siamese war strategy and tactics. After the Burmese conquest of Chiang Mai in mid-1763, some Lanna princedoms rebelled against Burma. In February 1764, King Hsinbyushin sent a Burmese regiment of 20,000 soldiers under Nemyo Thihapate to pacify and subjugate Lanna rebels. They proceeded to invade Ayutthaya from the north, thus initiating his new campaign to conquer Ayutthaya. Later that year, after pacifying Lanna, Nemyo Thihapate set off with his Burmese-Lanna forces to invade the Lao Kingdom of Luang Prabang in November 1764. In December 1764, Hsinbyushin dispatched another Burmese regiment of 20,000 soldiers under Maha Nawrahta to invade Siam from the west through Tavoy and Tenasserim. Meanwhile, King Ekkathat of Ayutthaya went on religious pilgrimages, visiting and worshipping the Holy Buddha's Footprint at Wat Phra Phutthabat of Saraburi in December 1764.

=== Burmese Invasion of Western Siam ===
Maha Nawrahta and his Burmese forces reconquered Tavoy in January 1765. Udaungza the self-proclaimed ruler of Tavoy fled to take refuge in Siamese-held port town of Mergui just to the south of Tavoy. Maha Nawrahta took commanding position at Tavoy and his forces became known as the 'Tavoy column'. Maha Nawrahta sent his forces to hotly pursue Udaungza to Mergui. The Burmese also took Mergui in January 1765. Both Udaungza and Prince Kromma Muen Thepphiphit, fugitive half-brother of King Ekkathat, who had been confined in Tenasserim by Ekkathat's orders, had to flee to the Gulf of Siam side of shorelines. Upon his return from royal pilgrimage to Saraburi, Ekkathat was possibly informed about the new Burmese invasion and ordered gun stands placed on the city walls and incendiaries be prepared against upcoming invaders but no serious nor profound military reforms were implemented against the militarily-experienced Burmese. Again, King Ekkathat called for Siamese forces at peripheral cities to abandon their cities to defend the royal citadel of Ayutthaya, hyper-centralizing and putting majority of the efforts to focus on defending the capital, leaving peripheral cities to Burmese invaders in the process. These governors included Phraya Tak the governor of Tak of Teochew Chinese descent.

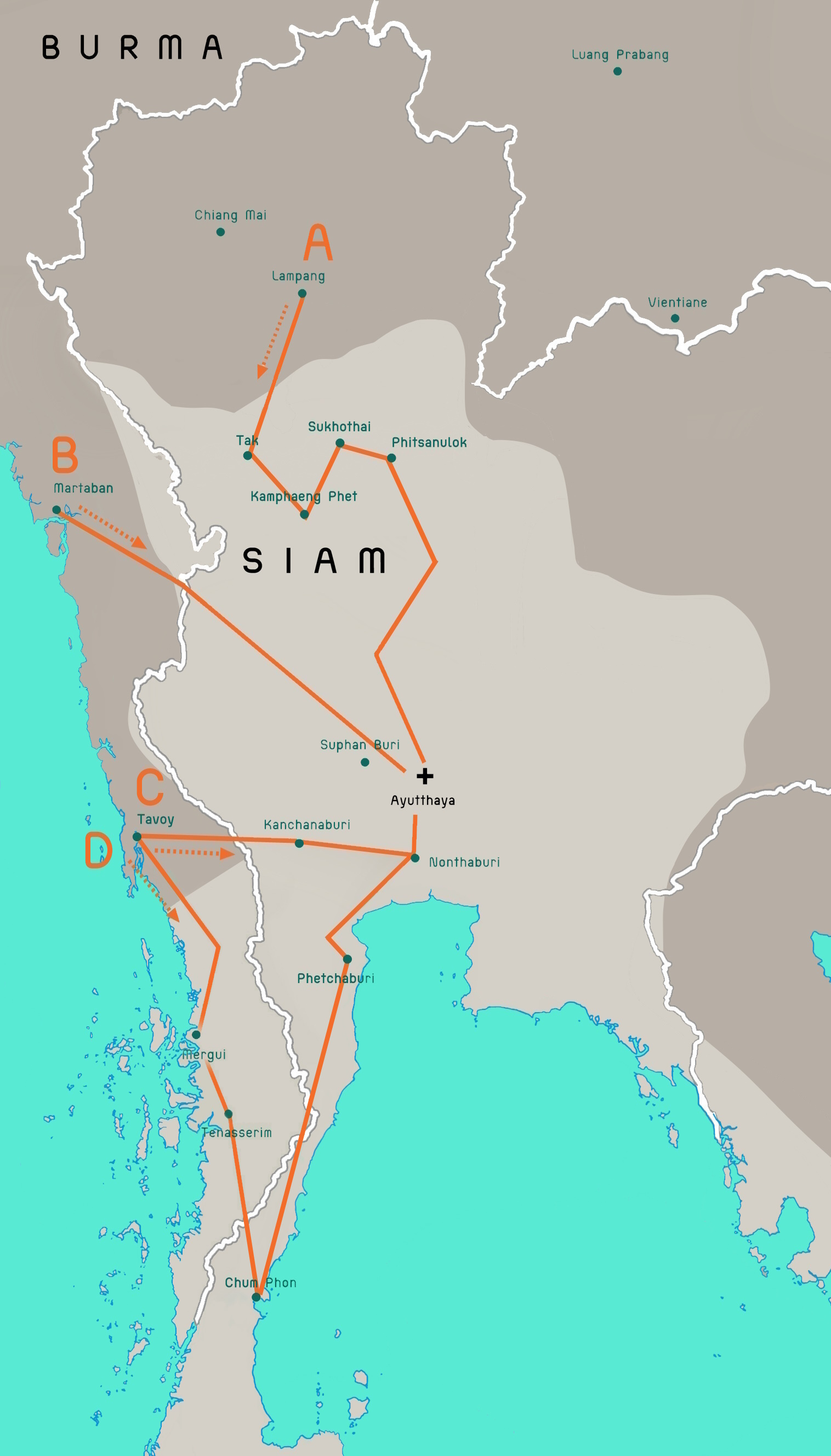
Map showing the Burmese Invasion of Siam in 1765 in two routes; from Tavoy, Tenasserim from the west and from Lanna from the north.

On the western front, the pursuing Burmese forces pillaged and conquered Siamese towns on the Gulf of Siam including Chumphon, Chaiya, Phetchaburi, Ratchaburi and Kanchanaburi. Most of these Western Siamese towns put up little to no resistances against the Burmese invaders. Ekkathat sent Ayutthayan royal forces of 15,000 men under his Chief Minister Chaophraya Phrakhlang to face the Burmese at Ratchaburi but the Siamese were defeated. Ekkathat granted Udaungza to take refuge in Chonburi, while Prince Thepphiphit was again confined in Chanthaburi on Eastern Siamese coast. In the north, Nemyo Thihapate hastily and successfully conquered Luang Phabang in March 1765, bringing the two Lao kingdoms of Luang Prabang and Vientiane under Burmese suzerainty. Burmese conquests of Lanna and Laos enabled the Burmese to access vast manpower resources, swelling up the Burmese-Lanna army of Nemyo Thihapate to 43,000 men and also enabled the Burmese to outflank and take control of Siam's northern frontiers.

=== Burmese approach onto Ayutthaya ===
Nemyo Thihapate led his Burmese 'Lanna' regiments to invade Northern Siam in August 1765. The Siamese put up substantial resistances at Sawankhalok and Phitsanulok but were overwhelmed by the downpouring and more resilient Burmese. Most of Northern Siamese towns offered little resistance. With Phitsanulok resisting strong, Nemyo Thihapate's vanguard under Satpagyon Bo went down in the less-defended pathway through Tak and Kamphaeng Phet. Nemyo Thihapate then proceeded to take position at Nakhon Sawan north of Ayutthaya. Three months later, in October 1765, Maha Nawrahta himself led his main Tavoy column of 20,000 men to enter Central Siam from the west. Ekkathat had commanded the governors of Phitsanulok and Nakhon Ratchasima, two major Siamese peripheral cities, to bring their forces to defend Ayutthaya. However, Chaophraya Phitsanulok Rueang the governor of Phitsanulok told the king that he had to return to attend the funeral of his mother at his hometown of Phitsanulok. Ekkathat could do nothing with this powerful governor who simply deserted the war to return to Phitsanulok.

Upon realizing the perils of deadly Burmese invasion, Abraham Werndlij the Dutch opperhoofd of Ayutthaya decided to pack up and left Ayutthaya in October 1765 without the approval of the Siamese king, ending Ayutthaya–Dutch relations. During this tumultuous time, Prince Chaofa Chit, who had been imprisoned in Ayutthaya for political reasons, broke the prison and fled to visit Uthumphon the temple king at Wat Pradu temple, apparently to persuade Uthumphon to rise against Ekkathat. This event put Ayutthayan royal court in turmoil as the Siamese king seemed to be bothered more by internal princely struggles than by external Burmese threats. When Uthumphon refused to comply, Prince Chaofa Chit fled north to Phitsanulok, where he was soon executed by Chaophraya Phitsanulok Rueang.

In late 1765, William Powney the British merchant arrived in Ayutthaya to trade his imported Indian textiles but was instead asked by Chaophraya Phrakhlang, Ekkathat's Chief Minister and Minister of Foreign Affairs, to help Ayutthaya repelling the Burmese invaders. Powney agreed and anchored his war brigantine at Thonburi, speculating the Burmese attack. The Burmese indeed attacked Powney at Thonburi in December 1765, prompting Powney to retreat to Nonthaburi. Realizing the Burmese military competency, Powney asked for more Siamese weapons and put up a tougher resistance. In the climactic Battle of Nonthaburi in December 1765, the Burmese feigned retreat as Powney brought his British–Siamese forces to occupy Nonthaburi. However, Powney soon realized he was surrounded by the Burmese who closed in to massacre the British. Humiliated by defeat and the Siamese court uncomplacent, Powney and his remaining British crew decided to take their ship to leave Siam.

== Burmese Siege of Ayutthaya: 1766–1767 ==
=== Battle of the outskirts ===
After subjugating and conquering Northern and Western Siamese peripheral cities and towns, the Burmese recruited a large number of surrendered Siamese men into their own ranks, adding to Burmese numerical strength. The Burmese invaders approached the Siamese royal citadel of Ayutthaya in January 1766 in three directions;

- Maha Nawrahta and his Burmese–Mon regiments of 'Tavoy column' of about 20,000 men took Suphanburi to the west of Ayutthaya and then approached Ayutthaya from the west, taking position at Siguk in modern Bangban district, ten kilometers to the west of Ayutthaya. Siamese king Ekkathat sent Chaophraya Phollathep the Minister of Agriculture to lead Siamese to repel the Burmese at Siguk but was defeated.
- Nemyo Thihapate and his Burmese–Lanna 'Chiang Mai column', absorbing Lanna and Lao men rising up to 43,000 men, marched from Nakhon Sawan through Ang Thong to approach northern outskirts of Ayutthaya. Ekkathat again sent his Chief Minister Chaophraya Phrakhlang to bring the Siamese forces of 10,000 men to face the approaching Burmese but was utterly defeated. Nemyo Thihapate then took position at Paknam Prasop in modern Bang Pahan district north of Ayutthaya citadel.
- Burmese riparian fleet sailed from Thonburi upstream the Chao Phraya River to approach Ayutthaya on its southern side, taking position at Bangsai duty checkpoint in modern Bang Pa-in district.

After the Burmese victory at Siguk, Maha Nawrahta of the Tavoy column sent vanguard forces to take position at Wat Phukhaothong temple just off the northwestern corner of Ayutthaya citadel itself. Ekkathat sent his ablest generals Phraya Phetchaburi Rueang and Phraya Tak to repel the Burmese at Wat Phukhaothong but the Siamese were eventually defeated despite initial success.

=== Bang Rachan ===
With all efforts to dislodge and prevent the Burmese from laying siege failed, Ayutthaya resorted to its traditional strategy of passive stand inside of the citadel against the Burmese besiegers, relying on the physical strength of the Ayutthayan walls fortified by French architects in the late seventeenth century and the arrival of wet rainy season to ward off the Burmese. Meanwhile, when the Burmese were besieging Ayutthaya, in February 1766, a local Siamese resistance emerged against Burmese occupation in Bang Rachan, composing of local Siamese fighting men and some venerable monks as spiritual leaders. Bang Rachan defenders, however, fought against a local Burmese garrison in Wiset Chaichan rather than the main Burmese forces. According to Thai chronicles written later in 1795 in Siamese patriotic tone, the Bang Rachan encampment managed to resist the attempts of local Burmese garrison to subjugate them seven times, only falling to the Burmese on the eighth attack on 20 June 1766 (2nd waning of eighth lunar month).

=== Burmese Siege of Ayutthaya ===
For whole seven months, from February to September 1766, there was no major battles between the Burmese besiegers and Ayutthayan defenders as the Siamese resorted to traditional strategy of passive stand inside of the Ayutthaya citadel. Ayutthayan defenders initially flared well as they were blessed with plentiful food resources. French missionaries described the situation in Ayutthaya as "only the beggars suffer from hunger". The Siamese simply waited out for the rainy season to come. When the rainy season arrived in May, the Siamese expected the Burmese to leave but the Burmese had other plans. Maha Nawrahta insisted that the Burmese besiegers should not relinquish their position at the advent of the wet season but rather persevered in the swampy inundated outskirts of Ayutthaya. Maha Nawrahta ordered the Burmese to move their food supplies and resources to unflooded high grounds, constructed boat vessels for transport and even cultivated rice. The siege of Ayutthaya became the battle of endurance.

In mid-1766, Prince Thepphiphit, half-brother and political enemy of Ekkathat, who had been confined at Chanthaburi on Eastern Siamese coast, arose to rally Eastern Siamese men to fight against the Burmese. Prince Thepphiphit rallied his Eastern Siamese host at Paknam Yothaka in modern Ban Sang, Prachinburi Province to the east of Ayutthaya. Prince Thepphiphit built himself a stockade at Paknam Yothaka and managed to raise his army of 20,000 men, preparing to march onto Ayutthaya to relieve the Burmese siege. When the news of Thepphiphit's uprising reached Ayutthaya, a great number of people, elite and commoner alike, fled through the less-besieged eastern suburbs of Ayutthaya to join the host of Thepphiphit at Paknam Yothaka. Ekkathat would never trust his renegade half-brother. However, it was the Burmese who marched out to defeat Thepphiphit at Paknam Yothaka, dispersing Thepphiphit's host. Thepphiphit then fled to Nakhon Ratchasima in the northeast

On 14 September 1766, the Burmese besiegers closed in with Maha Nawrahta moving from Siguk to Wat Phukhaothong temple off the northwestern corner of Ayutthaya and Nemyo Thihapate moving from Paknam Prasop down to Phosamton, just five kilometers to the north of Ayutthaya. In November 1766, when the flooding of Ayutthayan suburbs reached its peak, the battles resumed on boat vessels. Phraya Phetchaburi Rueang was killed in battle against the Burmese in November 1766 at Wat Sangkhawat temple at the southern side of Ayutthaya, while Phraya Tak rallied Chinese–Siamese men to break through the Burmese siege to leave Ayutthaya to the east in January 1767. The situation became increasingly desperate in Ayutthaya as the food became depleted and Ayutthayan people simply surrendered to the besieging Burmese to escape hunger.

=== Last defenses of Ayutthaya ===
Due to the intervening Qing Chinese invasion of Burma, in January 1767, King Hsinbyushin, who did not set foot into Siam in this campaign, ordered the Burmese besiegers to hasten their conquest of Ayutthaya to divert Burmese forces to the Chinese front. Maha Nawrahta then set up twenty-seven forts to surround Ayutthaya and to escalate the siege. Ekkathat recruited Chinese mercenaries under Luang Aphaiphiphat and the Portuguese to fight against the Burmese in last resort as the last line of defense. The Chinese mercenaries fortified themselves at Khlong Suan Phlu the Chinatown off the southeastern corner of Ayutthaya and the Portuguese at Ban Portuket nearby. However, some Chinese took this opportunity to go to loot and destroy Wat Phra Phutthabat temple of the Buddha's Footprint at Saraburi – the most sacred religious site of the kingdom. Ekkathat could do nothing against these looters but to simply ask the Chinese to return the gold they had taken from the sacred temple.

The Portuguese Catholic defenders initially put up strong resistances against the Burmese besiegers. Ekkathat sent out his delegate Phraya Kalahom the Minister of Military to negotiate with Maha Nawrahta. Maha Nawrahta, however, demanded unconditional surrender. Maha Nawrahta soon died of illness in February 1767, leaving his colleague Nemyo Thihapate as the supreme commander of the Burmese forces besieging Ayutthaya. The Chinese Ayutthayan defenders were defeated by the Burmese in February 1767 and the Portuguese were also defeated in March, with all Portuguese Catholic churches, the Dutch trade factory and Chinese settlements on the southern side all burnt down and destroyed by the Burmese.

== Fall of Ayutthaya and demise ==
=== Fall of Ayutthaya ===
By March 1767, Ayutthaya had depleted all of its defenses. Even local bandits volunteered to fight the Burmese. Nemyo Thihapate at Phosamton, then sole supreme commander of all the besieging Burmese forces, devised a plan to finalize the conquest of Ayutthaya. Nemyo Thihapate ordered the digging of underground tunnels into Ayutthaya at Huaraw on the northeastern corner of Ayutthaya citadel. He built three large forts at Huaraw to protect the tunnel digging. In attempts to halt this process, Ekkathat sent Chamuen Si Sorrarak Chim, brother-in-law of Ekkathat who had been severely punished by Uthumphon in 1760 and survived, to lead Siamese forces including bandits to attack the three Burmese forts at Huaraw. The Siamese forces under Chim, Ekkathat's brother-in-law, initially overwhelmed the Burmese at Huaraw but Burmese reinforcements eventually drove Siamese attackers back into the citadel.

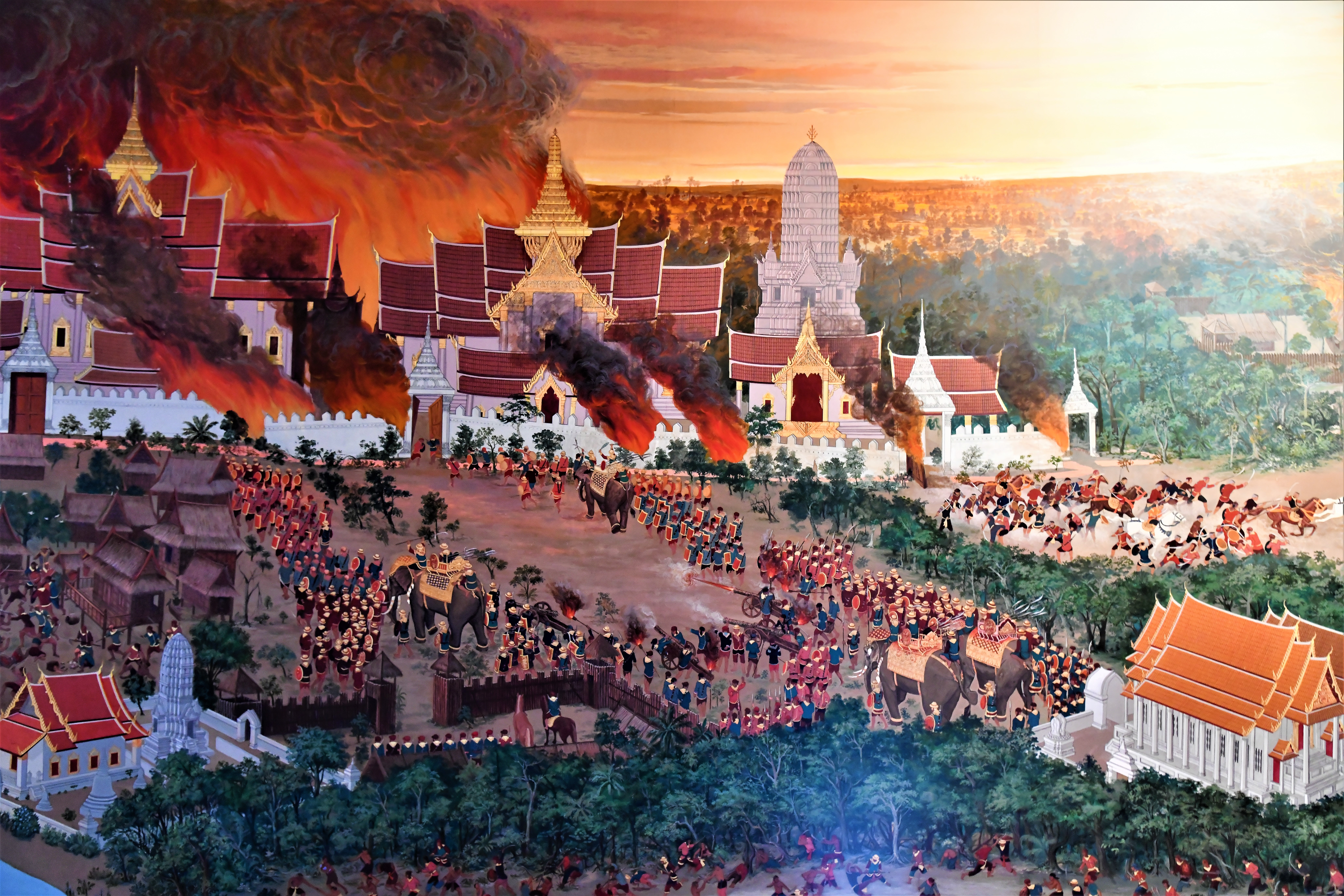
Modern depiction of the Fall of Ayutthaya in April 1767 at National Memorial of Thailand.

Before the eventual fall of Ayutthaya, Thai chronicles described the foreshadowing supernatural omens including the great Buddha Image of Wat Phanan Choeng temple crying in tears, the chest of a Buddha image at Wat Phra Si Sanphet temple splitting into two parts, a crow piercing itself to death at the top of a spire at Wat Ratchaburana temple and the statue of King Naresuan making trampling sounds. The Burmese, who were digging underground tunnels into Ayutthaya, did not manage to get inside of Ayutthaya by that route but instead got to the base of the Ayutthayan walls. The Burmese then set fire onto the base of the Ayutthayan wall, causing a northeastern portion of Ayutthayan wall at Huaraw to collapse, allowing the Burmese to enter. At 4 pm of 7 April 1767 the northeastern portion of Ayutthayan wall was brought down by fire and the Burmese entered Ayutthaya citadel at 8 pm. After the fourteen months of siege and endurance, the Ayutthaya royal city eventually fell to the Burmese on 7 April 1767.

=== Demise of Ekkathat ===
The victorious Burmese indiscriminately slaughtered Ayutthayan inhabitants and put everything in sight to flame. Ekkathat's ministers, Chaophraya Phrakhlang and Phraya Kalahom, continued to resist the Burmese with any remaining forces with Ekkathat himself escorted by his royal pages to flee the falling royal citadel, amidst chaos and the general massacre. Ayutthayan royal palaces, Buddhist temples, markets and vernacular houses were all burnt down and destroyed to the rubbles. Thai chronicles commented that the burning of the Ayutthaya city shone so brightly that it looked like a daytime. According to Burmese chronicles, King Ekkathat was fleeing through a west gate of Ayutthaya when he was shot and killed by a random gunshot in the middle of confusion, ending the life of the last king of Ayutthaya. Siamese chronicles said Ekkathat died upon having been in starvation for more than ten days while concealing himself at Ban Chik Woods (Thai: ป่าบ้านจิก), adjacent to Wat Sangkhawat (Thai: วัดสังฆาวาส) in the southern outskirts of Ayutthaya, where his dead body was discovered by a monk.

With the demise of Ekkathat the last king of Ayutthaya in April 1767, the 417-year-old Ayutthaya kingdom, founded in 1350 and the 79-year-old Ban Phlu Luang dynasty, founded by Phetracha in 1688, were brought to an end by the Burmese conquest. Ayutthayan princes, princesses and nobles who survived the calamity were deported as war captives by Burmese conquerors to the Burmese royal capital of Ava. Uthumphon the temple king, Ekkathat's younger brother, was captured and deported to Burma along with other members of the Ban Phlu Luang dynasty including Ekkathat's chief queen Wimonphat, his consorts Pheng and Maen, his two sons and four daughters, his half-sisters Princess Mongkut and Princess Kunthon. Ekkathat's Chatusadom ministers were also captured and taken including his chief minister Chaophraya Phrakhlang, Phraya Kalahom the Minister of Military, Phraya Ratchaphakdi the royal treasurer and Chaophraya Phonlathep the Minister of Agriculture. Chaophraya Phrakhlang reportedly committed suicide on the way.

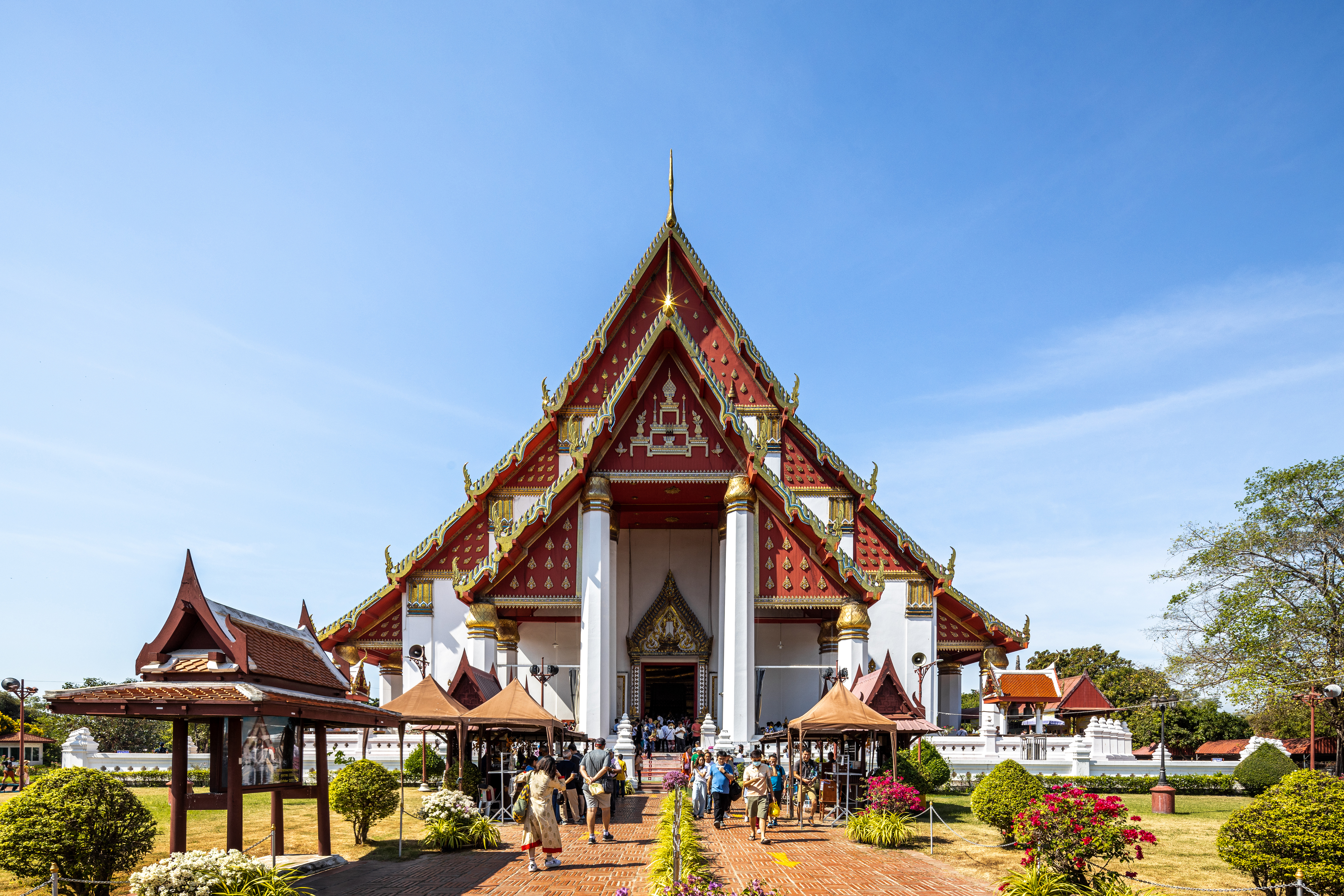
Ekkathat's body was buried in a mound in front of Wiharn Mongkhon Bophit temple in April 1767. Seven months later, in November 1767, Phraya Tak ordered the body of Ekkathat to be exhumed and given proper ceremonies.

Ekkathat's body was hurriedly buried by the Burmese at a mound named "Khok Phra Men" (Thai: โคกพระเมรุ), in front of a revered Siamese temple called "Phra Wihan Phra Mongkhonlabophit" (Thai: พระวิหารพระมงคลบพิตร). After the Burmese conquest of Ayutthaya, Nemyo Thihapate the supreme Burmese commander left Ayutthaya about two months later in June 1767 along with about 30,000 Ayutthayan captives back to Burma, leaving a small garrison under a Mon official named Thugyi at Phosamton to the north of Ayutthaya to oversee the Burmese short-lived occupation of Lower Central Siam. Ekkathat's sisters and half-sisters who were unfit to travel were left at Phosamton to stay. Princess Suriya and Princess Chanthawadi died at Phosamton during the Burmese occupation, presumably from illnesses and poor living conditions. When Phraya Tak reconquered Ayutthaya seven months later in November 1767, he found the remaining Ayutthayan princesses at Phosamton in deplorable state. Princess Phinthawadi survived into Bangkok Period, becoming the instructor of royal ceremonies for the new Siamese royal dynasty until her death in 1801.

Phraya Tak ordered the body of King Ekkathat buried in front of the Wiharn Mongkhonbophit temple, adjacent to the Wat Phra Si Sanphet temple, to be exhumed and given an abbreviated proper royal cremation ceremonies in November 1767. Ekkathat's younger brother Uthumphon survived as a Buddhist monk and spent about thirty years in exile in Ava and Amarapura, Burma until his eventual death in 1796.

== Issue ==
#	Consort and Concubines	Children
1.	Maengmao, Princess Wimonphat	Princess Siri Chanthrathewi (or Noi)
2.	Royal Concubine Pheng	Princess Satansarin (or Praphan Suriyawong); Prince Prawet Kuman (or Praphai Kuman)
3.	Royal Concubine Maen	Princess Sura (or Rutchathewi); Prince Suthat (or Kumara)
	Unknown mother	Prince Set; Princess Dok Maduea

== In popular culture ==
- Portrayed by Thantat Wiphatayothin in the 1955 Thai film Taharn Suea Phra Chao Tak
- Portrayed by Surasit Satayawong in the 1979 Thai film The Last Day of Ayudhya
- Portrayed by Toy Aigner in the 2002 CH3 TV drama Nirat Song Phop
- Portrayed by Sattawat Dullayavijit in the 2004 and 2007 CH7 TV drama Fa Mai and Pu Som Fao Sap
- Portrayed by Ram Ratchaphong in the 2007 CH3 TV drama Taksin Maharat
- Portrayed by Surasit Chalatchuenchom in the 2011 Thai film Unsung Hero
- Portrayed by Witaya Wasukraipaisarn in the 2015 CH3HD TV drama Bangrajun
- Portrayed by Peeramon Chomdhavat in the 2016 one31 TV drama Pitsawat
- Portrayed by Praptpadol Suwanbang in the 2017 CH8 TV drama The Legend of Siam Hero
- Portrayed by Nopachai Jayanama in the 2017 True4U film series Sri Ayodhaya
- Portrayed by Thitinan Suwannasak in the 2018 CH7HD TV drama Sai Lohit

Ekkathat (Borommaracha III) Ban Phlu Luang dynasty Born: 1718 Died: 17 April 1767
Regnal titles
Preceded by Uthumphon	King of Ayutthaya; 1758 – 7 April 1767	Vacant Fall of Ayutthaya Title next held by Taksin as King of Thonburi
