= Phukhao Thong =

Phukhao Thong (Thai: ภูเขาทอง, literally: golden mount) may refer to:

- Wat Phukhao Thong and Chedi Phukhao Thong, a historic temple and its main stupa, in Phra Nakhon Si Ayutthaya Province
- Phukhao Thong, Phra Nakhon Si Ayutthaya, the subdistrict that covers the historic area
- Phukhao Thong or Phra Borommabanphot, a cetiya atop an artificial hill in Wat Saket in Bangkok
- Phukhao Thong, Narathiwat, the subdistrict is surrounded by Hala-Bala forestland in the southernmost of Thailand
- Phukhao Thong, Roi Et, the subdistrict in Nong Phok District, Roi Et Province
