= Pu Som Fao Sap =

Type of Thai ghost

Pu Som Fao Sap ปู่โสมเฝ้าทรัพย์
Creature information
- Other name: Pu Som
- Grouping: Legendary creature
- Sub grouping: Tutelary deity
- Similar entities: Brownie; Leprechaun; Kobold; Lares; Penates; Dwarf; Nisse; Zashiki-warashi
- Folklore: Thai folk mythology

Origin
- Country: Thailand
- Region: Mainland Southeast Asia
- Habitat: Ancient treasure site

Pu Som Fao Sap (Thai: ปู่โสมเฝ้าทรัพย์, RTGS: Pu Som Fao Sap, pronounced [pùː sǒm fào sàp], lit. 'Grandfather Som who guards treasures') is a type of Thai ghost believed to guard precious treasures or national wealth, such as hidden riches from the Ayutthaya Kingdom. Its role resembles that of guardian spirits or tutelary deities who protect sacred possessions.

== Sightings ==
The most well-known account took place around 1957–1958 at Wat Ratchaburana in Ayutthaya, when a group of thieves secretly looted the temple's treasure hoard over the course of three days because of its vast abundance. After smuggling the artifacts out, strange phenomena were reported. The Phra Saeng Khan Chai Si, one of the royal regalia swords, was said to have emitted a dazzling light, while the sky turned ominously unsettled. Soon after, one of the looters, appearing intoxicated, surrendered to the police and confessed his involvement, returning the stolen items. Other members of the group suffered bizarre fates, with some reportedly going mad and performing sword dances in public markets, while shops that had purchased the artifacts were forced to shut down. Only about 20 percent of the stolen treasures were ever recovered, which are now preserved and displayed at the Chao Sam Phraya National Museum. Many believe these events were the work of the spectral guardian who watches over the ancient hoard.

However, further details suggest a much more mundane explanation. According to accounts, one of the looters was himself a police officer. When disputes arose over how to divide the treasure, with the officer attempting to keep the most valuable artifacts for himself, he reported the matter to his superior. Suspicious of his behavior, the commander detained him, which eventually led to the arrest of the entire gang. As for the oft-repeated claim that one of the thieves went mad and performed sword dances in a marketplace, this appears to have been a separate event years later. In reality, one of the men, heavily intoxicated, had staged a drunken sword dance in public. Observers later conflated this with the earlier looting case, interpreting it as evidence of a curse tied to the ancient treasure.

This more sober account is consistent with the findings of I Wouldn't Go in There, a documentary aired on National Geographic in 2013. After interviewing contemporary Ayutthaya residents, the program concluded that the legendary tales were greatly exaggerated, and that the looters had in fact been apprehended through ordinary police work rather than supernatural retribution.

Prince Birabongse Bhanudej, commonly known as Prince Bira, a celebrated Thai Formula One driver before World War II, once recounted his encounter with the legend of Pu Som Fao Sap in 1961 during a meeting of the Psychical Research Society of Thailand. He explained that in December 1960 he had used a mine detector, then considered advanced technology, to search for buried treasures at the ruins of Wat Kudi Dao in Ayutthaya. An agreement with the Fine Arts Department stipulated that any discoveries would be divided, ninety percent for the state and ten percent for him. Despite several attempts, nothing was found. Villagers explained that this was because he had failed to perform rituals or seek permission from the spirits, so the treasures were supernaturally moved away.

That night, after returning to his residence on Sukhumvit Road, he heard the sound of digging, "chuk chuk," around his bedroom. When he went to investigate nothing could be seen, yet the noise continued and even shifted its position, sometimes above the ceiling, until morning.

On another day, while excavating a valuable object at Wat Kudi Dao, he looked up and saw a towering headless figure near the chapel ruins. The apparition resembled an ancient warrior in dark blue garments, muscular and imposing. He murmured, "A ghost," but when he approached he found only a large tree growing in a hollow. When he told the villagers, they insisted that it had been the spirit of Pu Som Fao Sap, appearing as a sign that he was close to uncovering hidden wealth.

A European companion who had joined the excavation also confirmed that he too had seen the headless phantom. Later, when the prince shared the story with a monk known for his spiritual insight, the monk explained that the apparition was Phat, an aide-de-camp of King U-Thong, the founder of Ayutthaya, cursed to guard the treasures and punish intruders.

Not long after, the prince's foreign companion died unexpectedly at a young age, while the prince himself suffered repeated failures in business. Prince Bira concluded that although he had once dismissed all belief in spirits, after experiencing these events with his own eyes he had come to believe completely.

== In a scholarly context ==
Although stories of Pu Som Fao Sap are well known today and often linked to historical events in Ayutthaya, historian Rungroj Piromanukul of Ramkhamhaeng University (RU) suggests that such beliefs were unlikely to originate in the Ayutthaya period itself. His argument rests on the absence of treasure-guarding spirits in the Three Seals Law Code (กฎหมายตราสามดวง), which otherwise contains a detailed catalogue of supernatural beings. Furthermore, the concept conflicts with Theravāda Buddhist doctrine, which holds that once a person dies, their spirit must transition to another realm rather than linger to guard material wealth.

Moreover, neither historical records nor archaeological evidence in Thailand indicate that individuals were ever executed in order to become guardian spirits of hidden treasures. Taken together, these findings support the view that the notion of treasure-guarding ghosts, including Pu Som Fao Sap, was not an authentic belief of the Ayutthaya period but rather a later cultural construction, likely developed to sacralize hidden treasures or to explain their mysterious discovery.

== In media ==
The story of Pu Som Fao Sap was adapted into a television drama of the same name on Channel 7 in 2007, starring Suvanant Punnakant. It was broadcast again in late 2016 during the national mourning period for the passing of King Bhumibol Adulyadej (Rama IX). At that time, entertainment content was largely restricted, but programs related to history or Thai heritage were allowed to air. Later, the story was further adapted into the television drama Pitsawat on One 31 in 2016, based on a work by Thommayanti, starring Woranuch Bhirombhakdi. In this adaptation, the treasure-guarding spirit was reimagined as a female ghost who had been executed by decapitation.
