= Phukhao Thong, Phra Nakhon Si Ayutthaya =

Coordinates: 14°21′47.77″N 100°32′44.66″E

Phukhao Thong ภูเขาทอง
- Tambon
- Interactive map of Phukhao Thong
- Country: Thailand
- Province: Phra Nakhon Si Ayutthaya
- District: Phra Nakhon Si Ayutthaya

Area
  - Total: 44.91 km^{2} (17.34 sq mi)

Population (2005)
  - Total: 2,748
  - Density: 61.19/km^{2} (158.5/sq mi)
- Time zone: UTC+7 (ICT)
- Postal Code: 13000
- Geocode: 140108

Phukhao Thong (Thai: ภูเขาทอง, pronounced [pʰūː.kʰǎw tʰɔ̄ːŋ]) is a sub-district (tambon) in Phra Nakhon Si Ayutthaya Province, administered by Phra Nakhon Si Ayutthaya District in central Thailand.

== Geography ==
The sub-district is on the Chao Phraya river about 71 km north of Bangkok and about 3 km north-west of the city of Ayutthaya. Tourist sites include Chedi Phukhao Thong and the adjacent monument to King Naresuan of Ayutthaya.

Neighboring sub-districts are (from the north clockwise) Wat Tum, Lum Phli, Tha Wasukri, Ban Pom, and Ban Mai.

== Economy ==
Employment in Phukhao Thong is based on retail and service industries. Products exported from the tambon include hammocks, fish-shaped mobiles made from palm leaves representing the emblem of Ayutthaya, and fans made from peacock feathers.

== Administration ==
The entire sub-district is administered by a tambon administrative organization (TAO), created in 1999. It is subdivided into four villages (muban).

1	บ้านวัดช่อง	Ban Wat Chong
2	บ้านภูเขาทอง	Ban Phukhao Thong
3	บ้านหัวพราน	Ban Hua Phran
4	บ้านหาดทราย	Ban Hat Sai
