= Chedi Phukhao Thong =

Buddhist tower in Thailand

Coordinates: 14.369083°N 100.539751°E

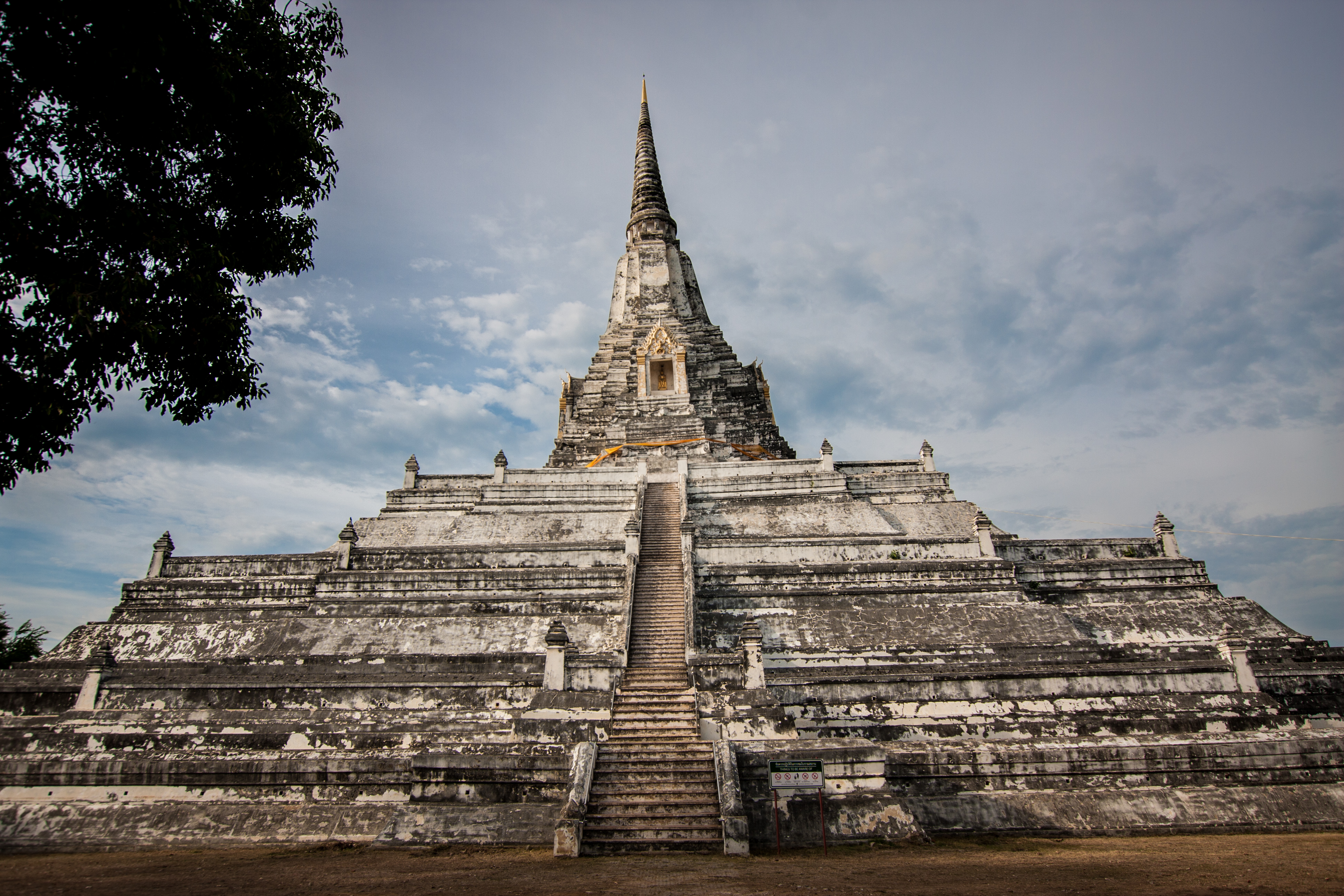
Chedi Phukhao Thong

Chedi Phukhao Thong (Thai: เจดีย์ภูเขาทอง) is a 50-metre chedi, or Buddhist tower, in the village of Phukhao Thong near Ayutthaya in central Thailand. Visitors can climb as far a landing halfway up the chedi, from which the surrounding rice fields and the town of Ayutthaya can be seen. In 2014 it was possible for the public to visit the shrine inside the central tower.

== History ==
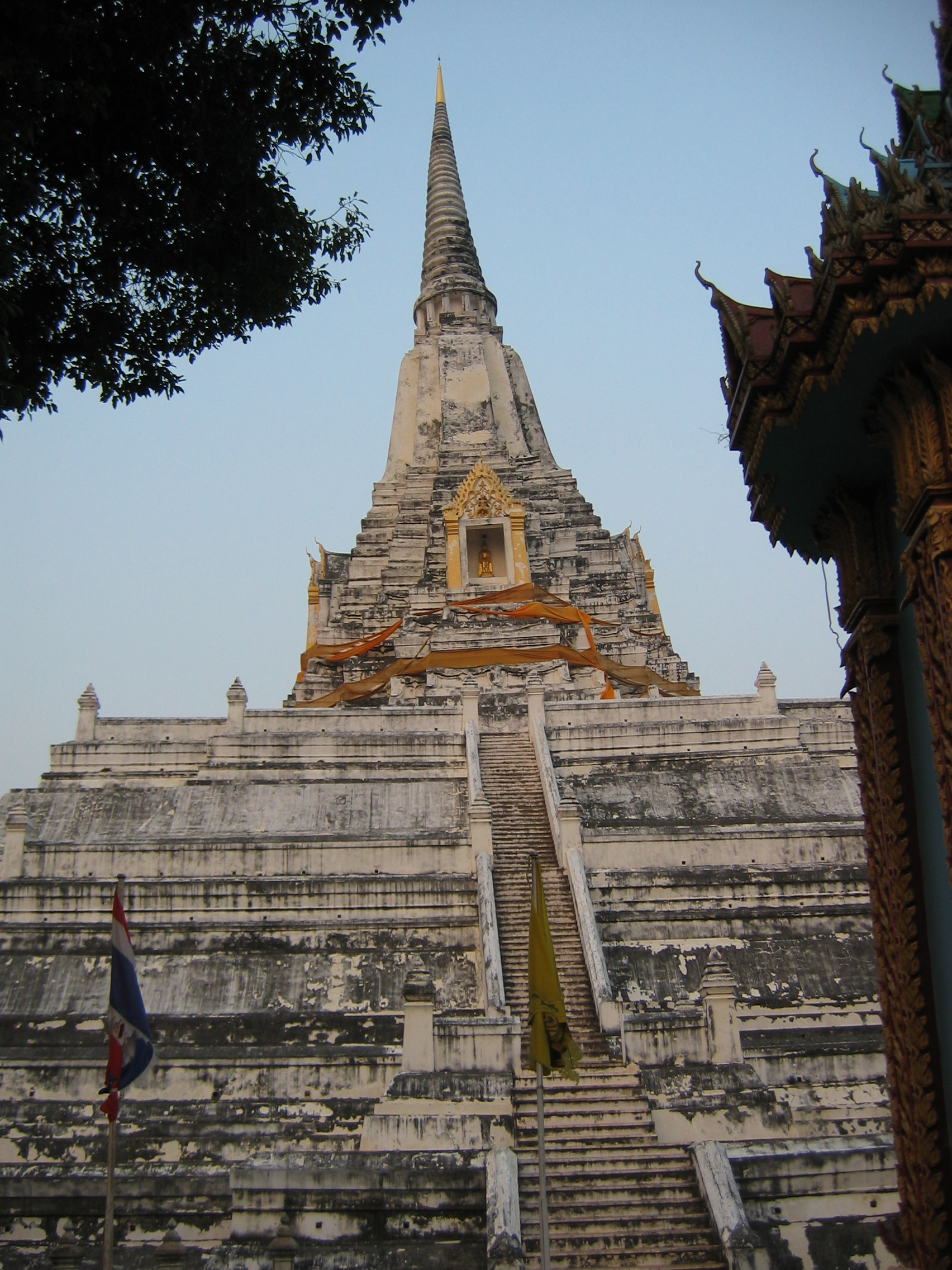
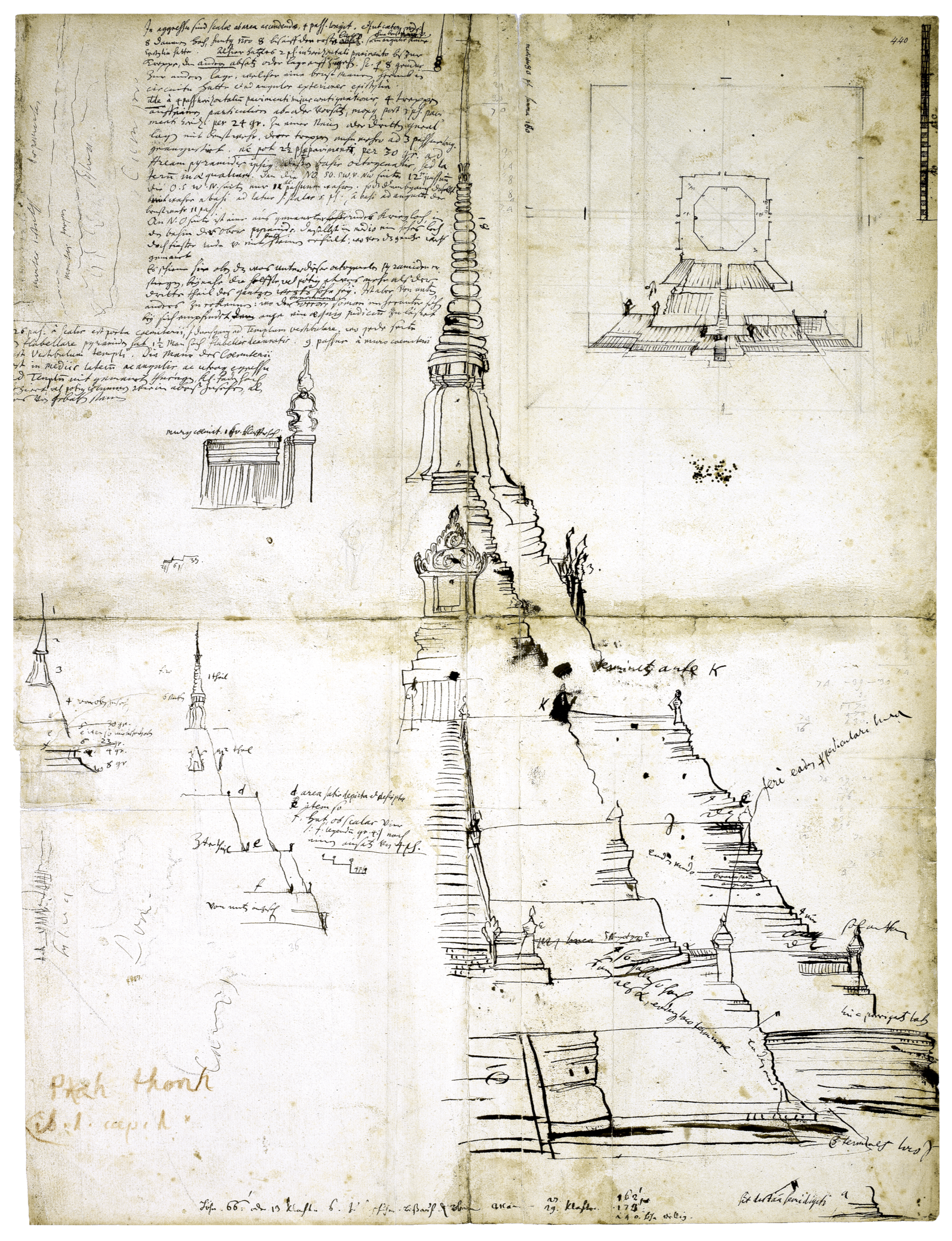
Wat Phu Khao Thong, Ayutthaya: the chedi today (left) and Engelbert Kaempfer's 1690 sketch with plan (right).

In 1569, having taken Ayutthaya, King Bayinnaung of Bago (now part of Myanmar) built a large chedi, next to the Buddhist temple of Wat Phukhao Thong, to commemorate his victory. The chedi was never completed, only the base was ever constructed when in 1587, Prince Naresuan, to commemorate his victory over the Burmese in 1584 following Ayutthaya's liberation from Burma, decided to build a Thai-style chedi over the base of the still-unfinished Burmese-style chedi. Over the next two centuries the chedi fell into disrepair. In a restoration during the reign of King Boromakot (ruled 1733–1758) a new chedi in Thai style, having a square plan with indented corners, was built on the base of the ruin.

The adjacent temple, founded by King Ramesuan in 1387, is still in use.

== Gallery ==
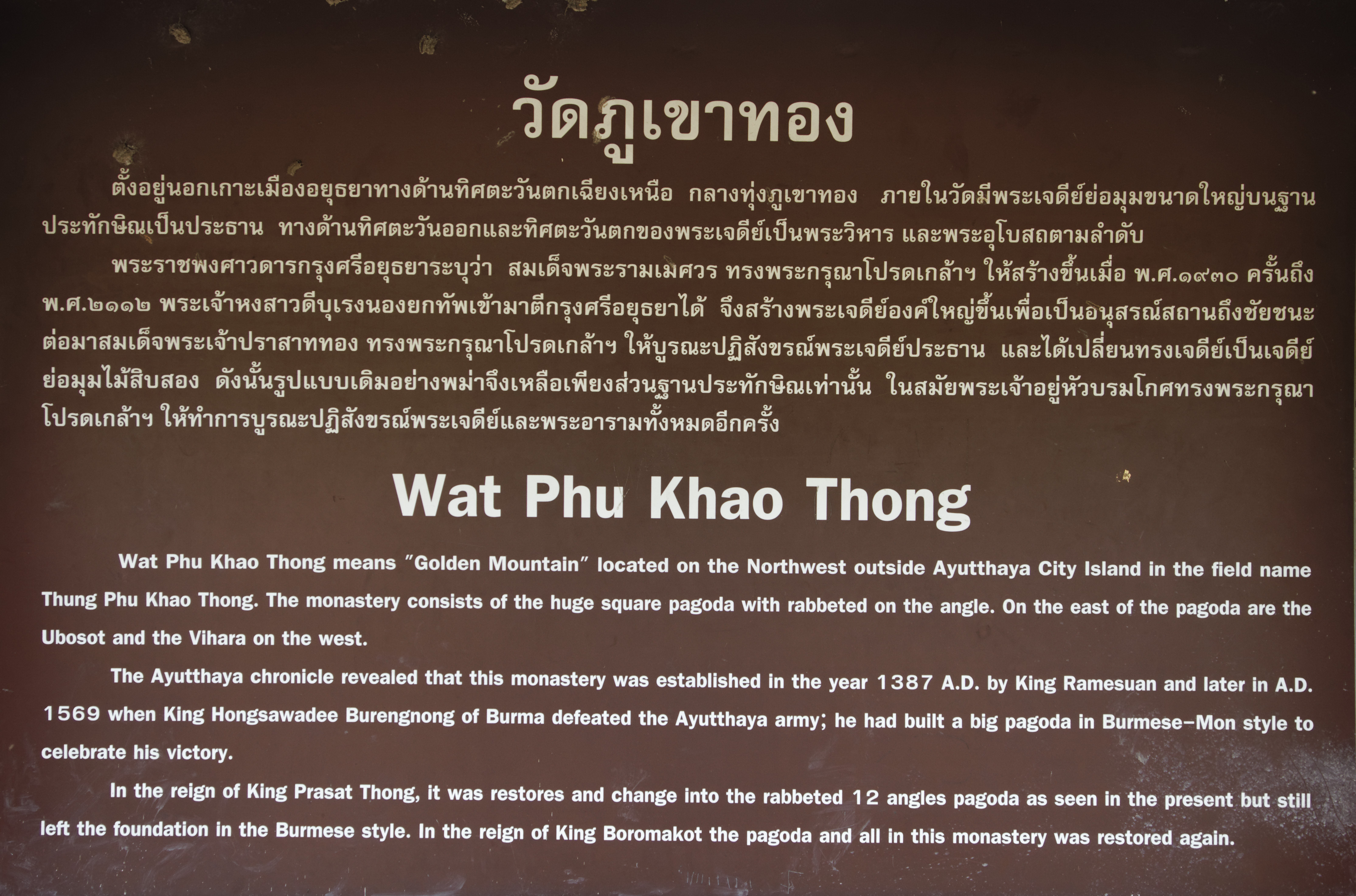
Information plaque

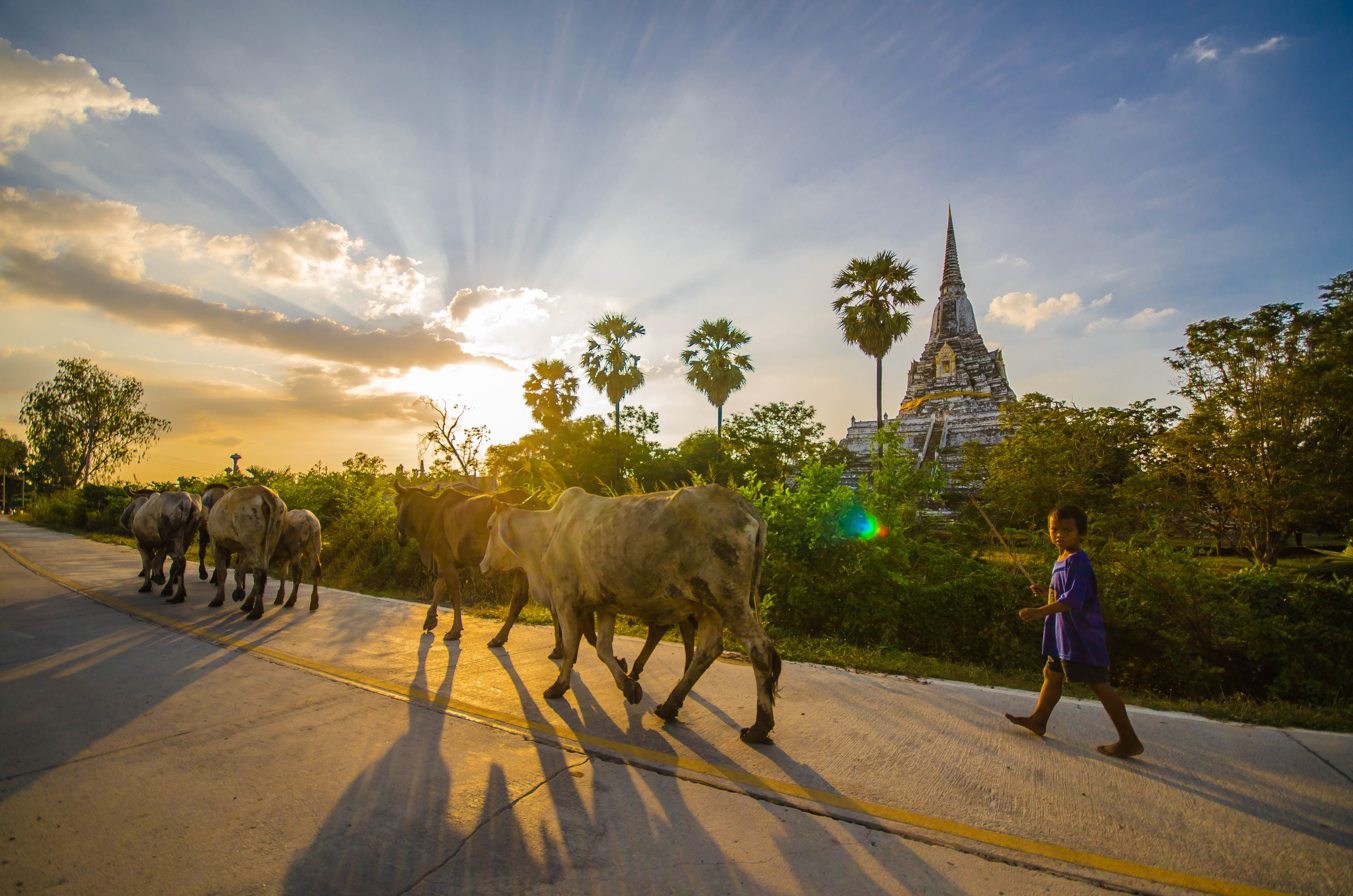

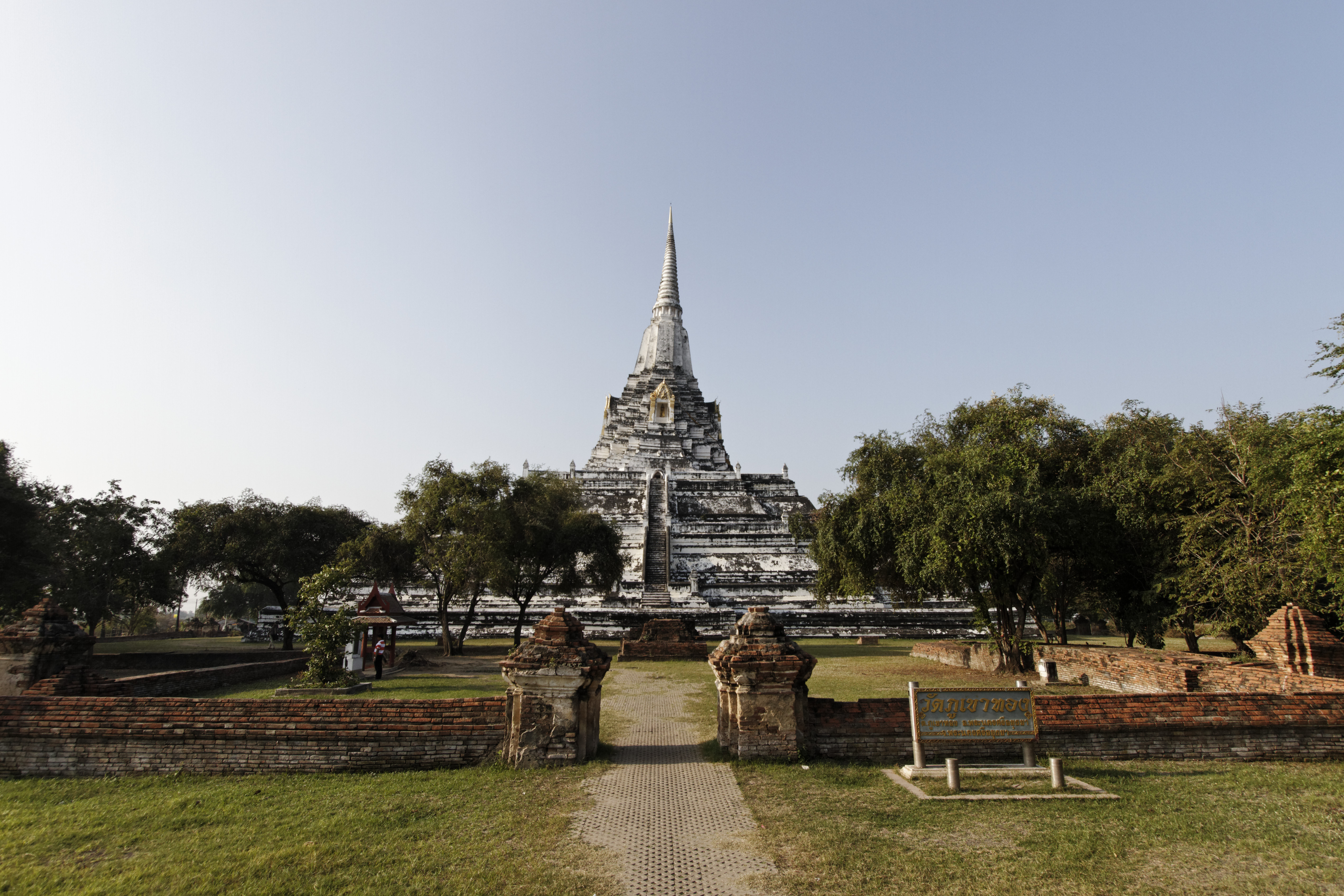

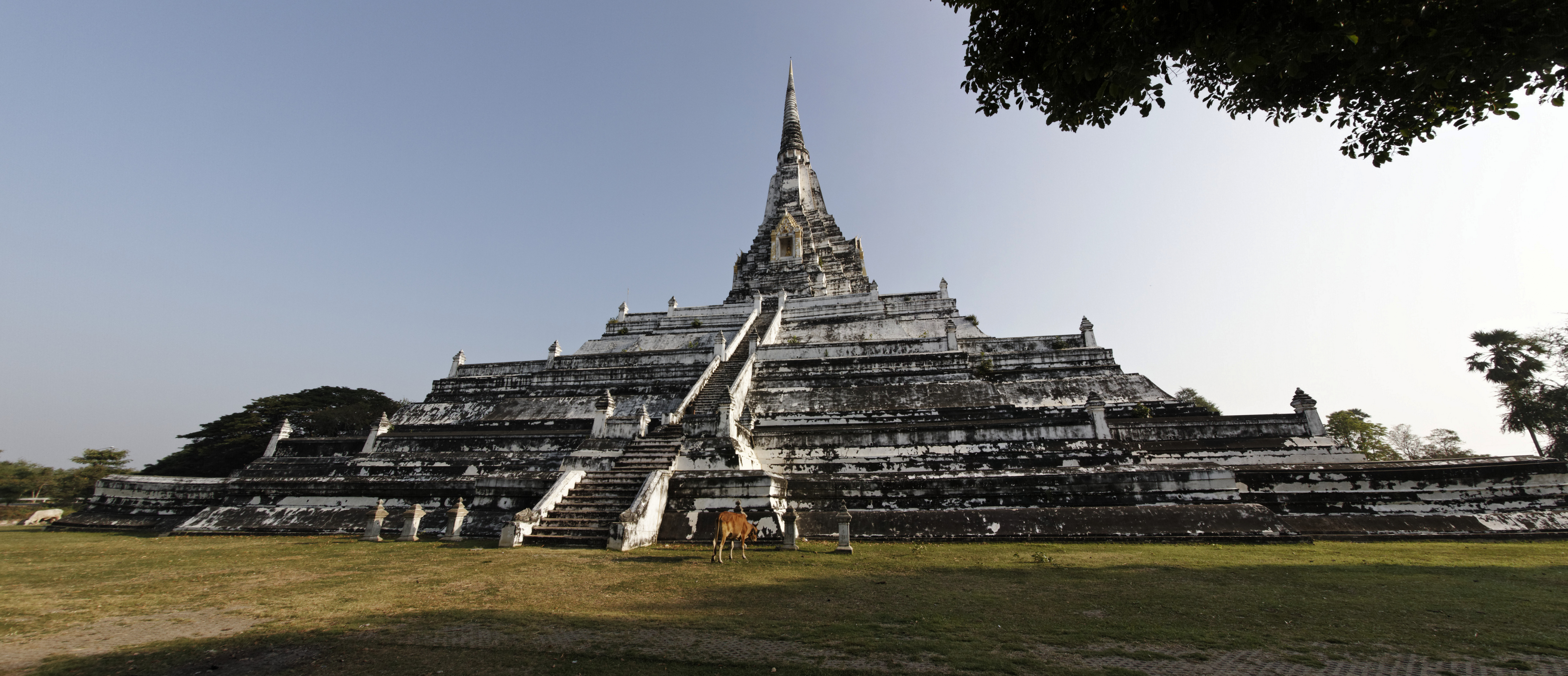

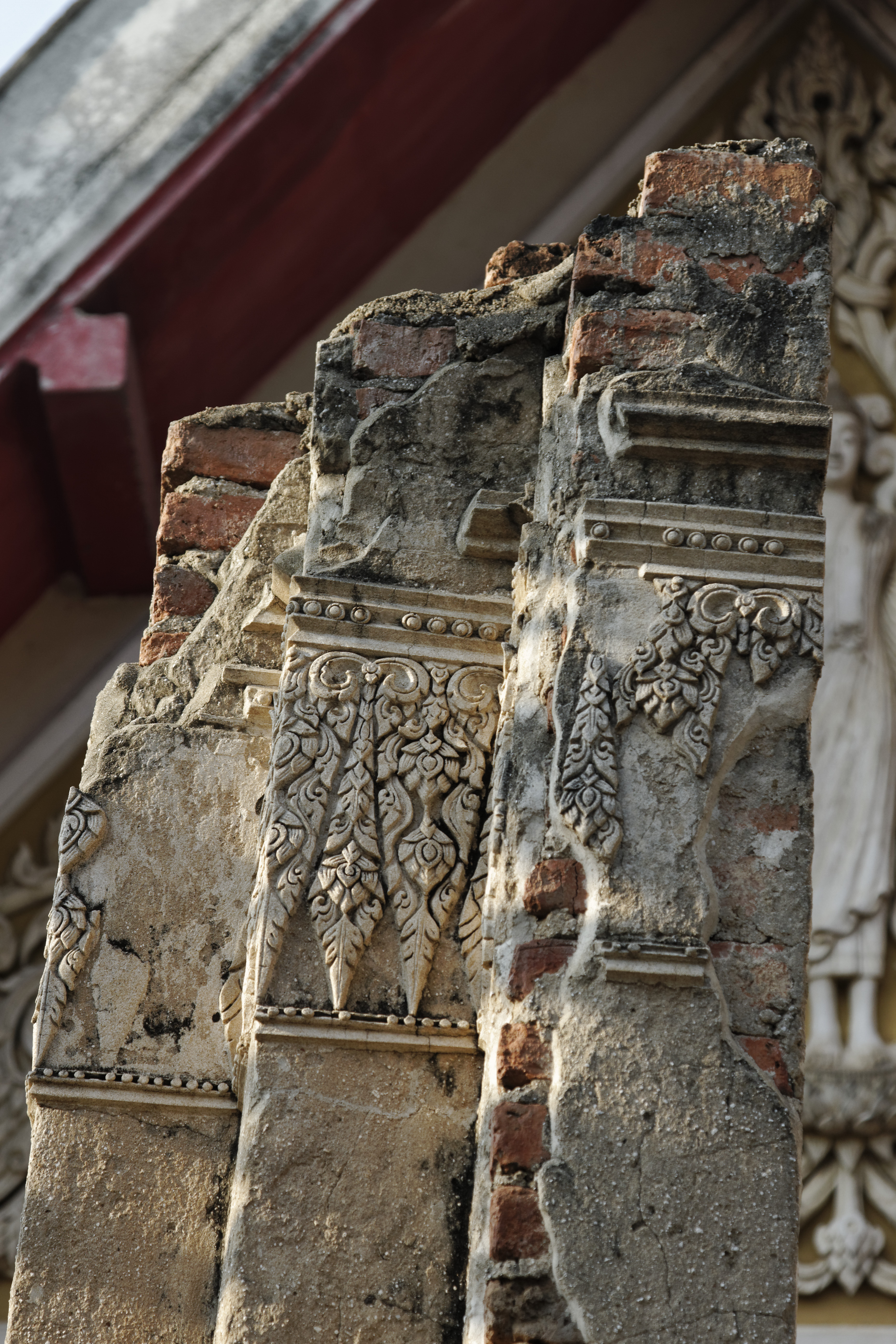

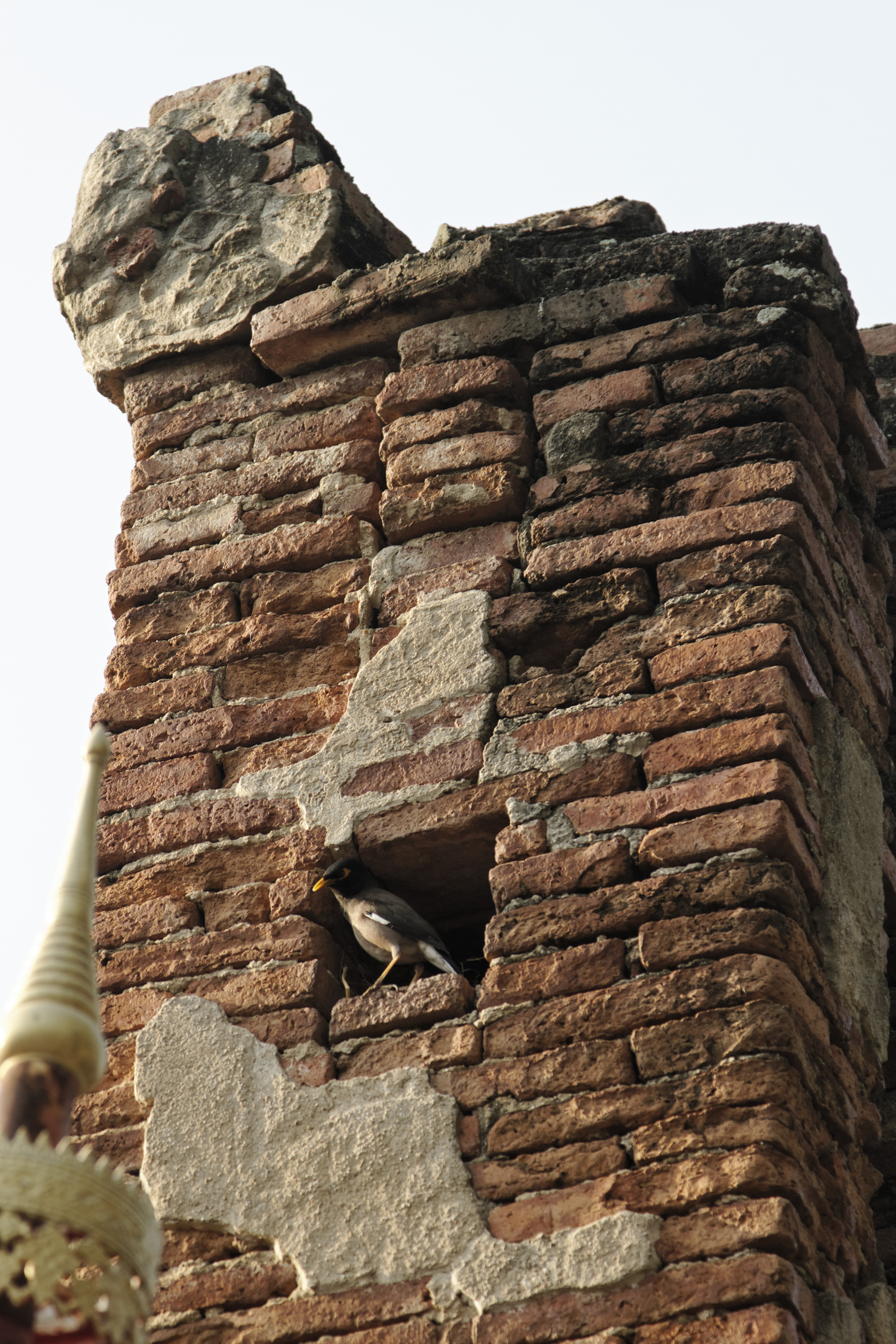

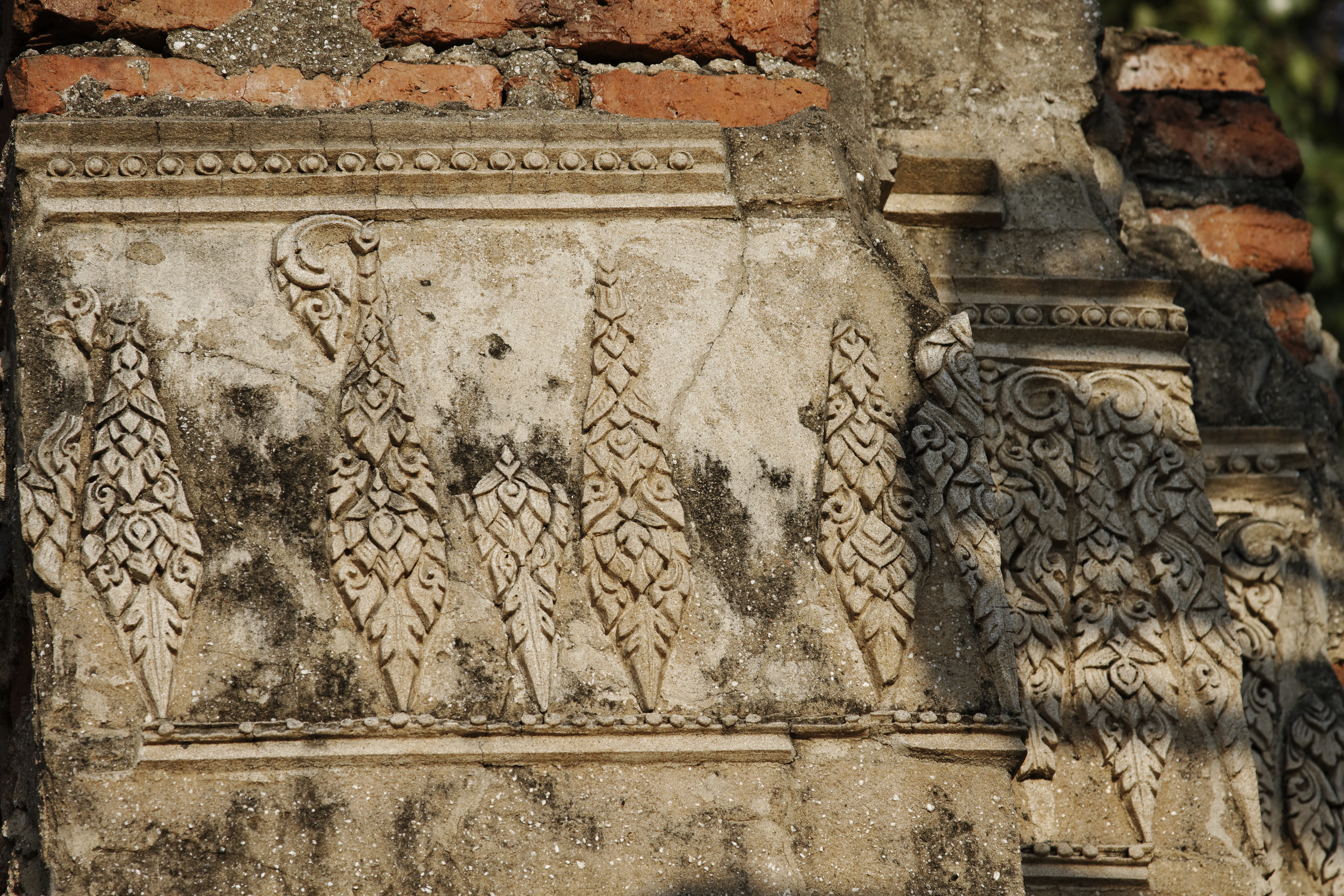
