= Wat Kudi Dao =

Buddhist temple ruins in Ayutthaya province, Thailand

Coordinates: 14°21′47.9304″N 100°35′24.365″E

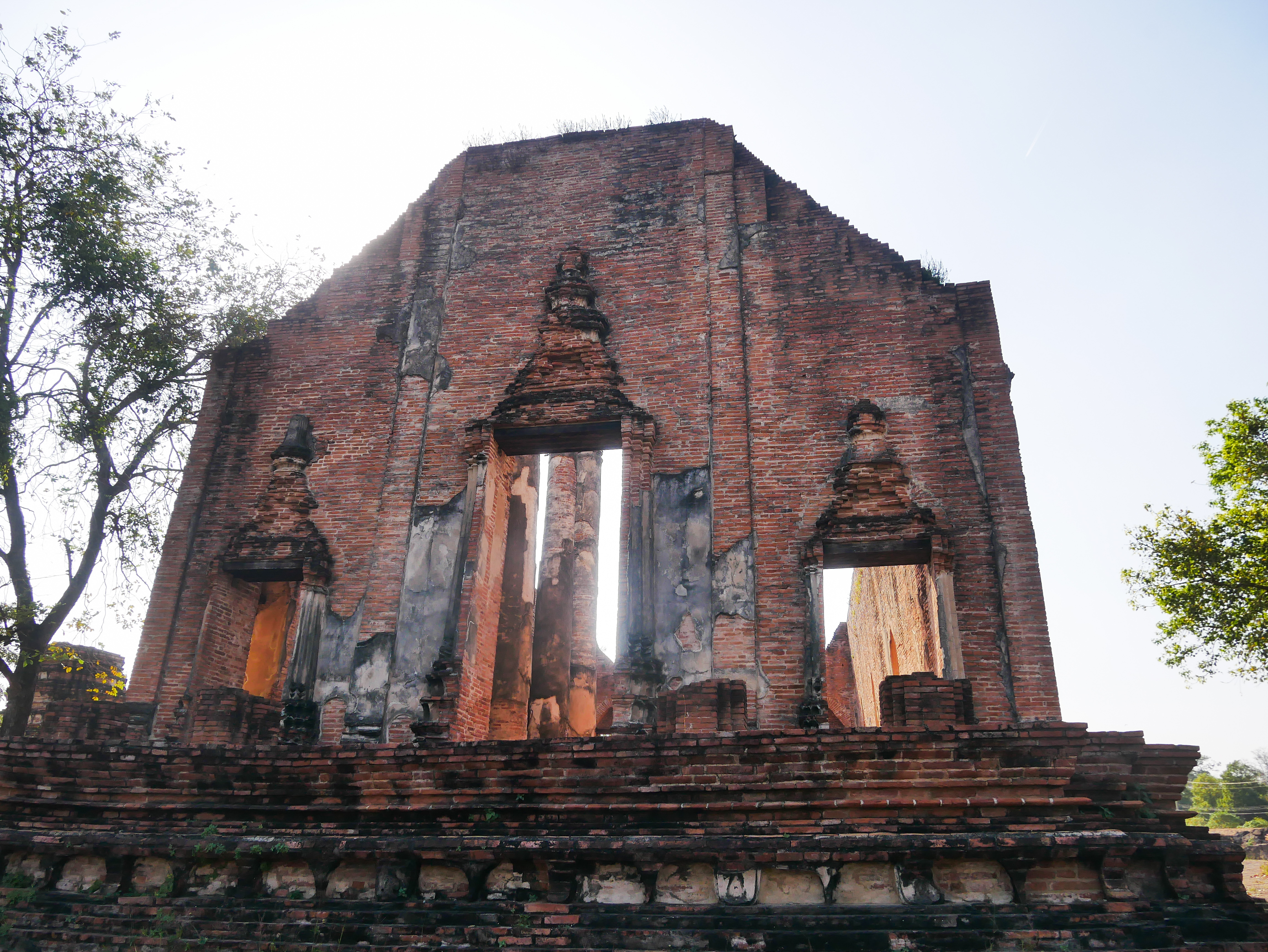
Wat Kudi Dao is located outside the city island to the east in Phra Nakhon Si Ayutthaya district.

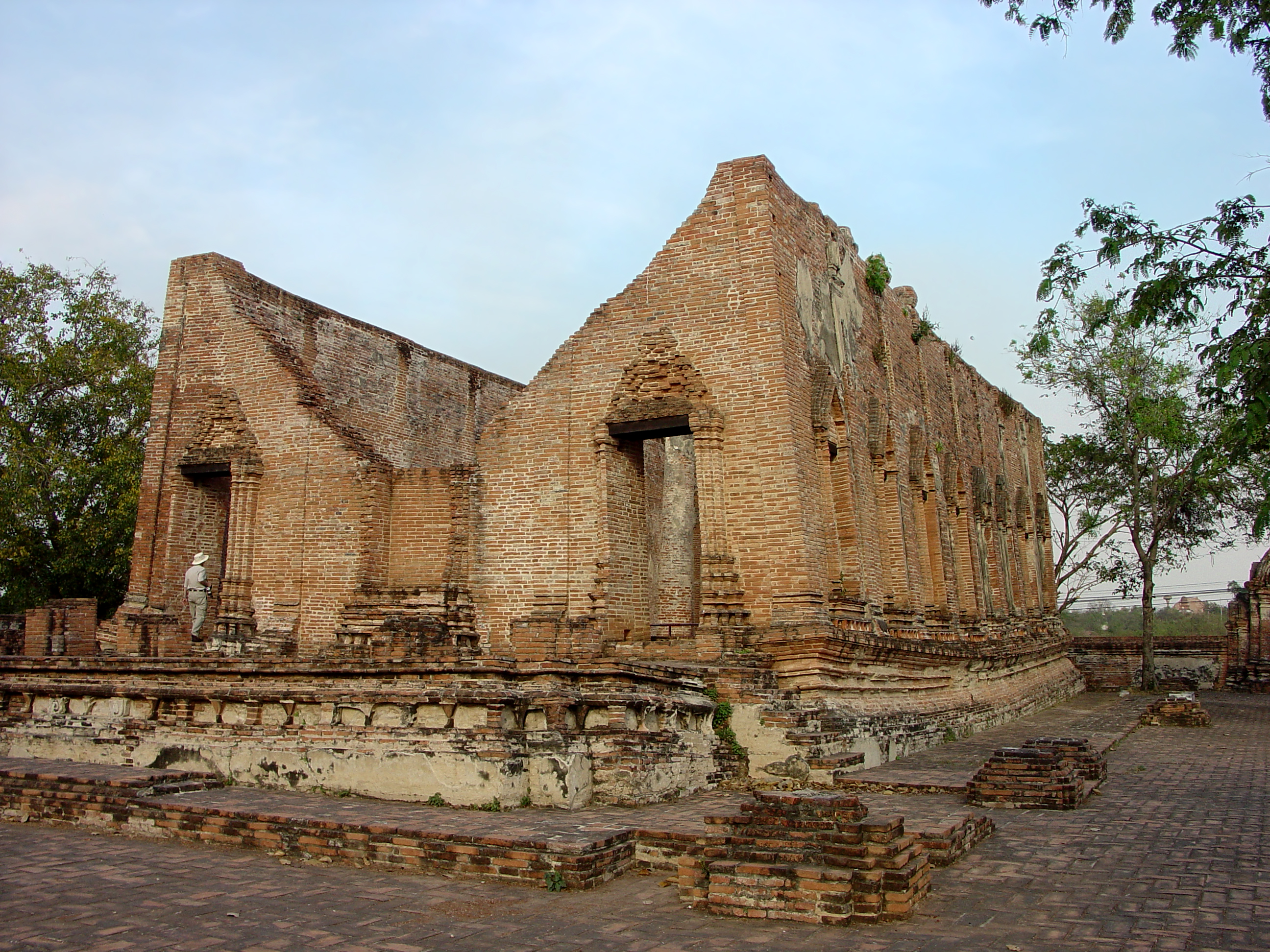
Ubosot of Wat Kudi Dao

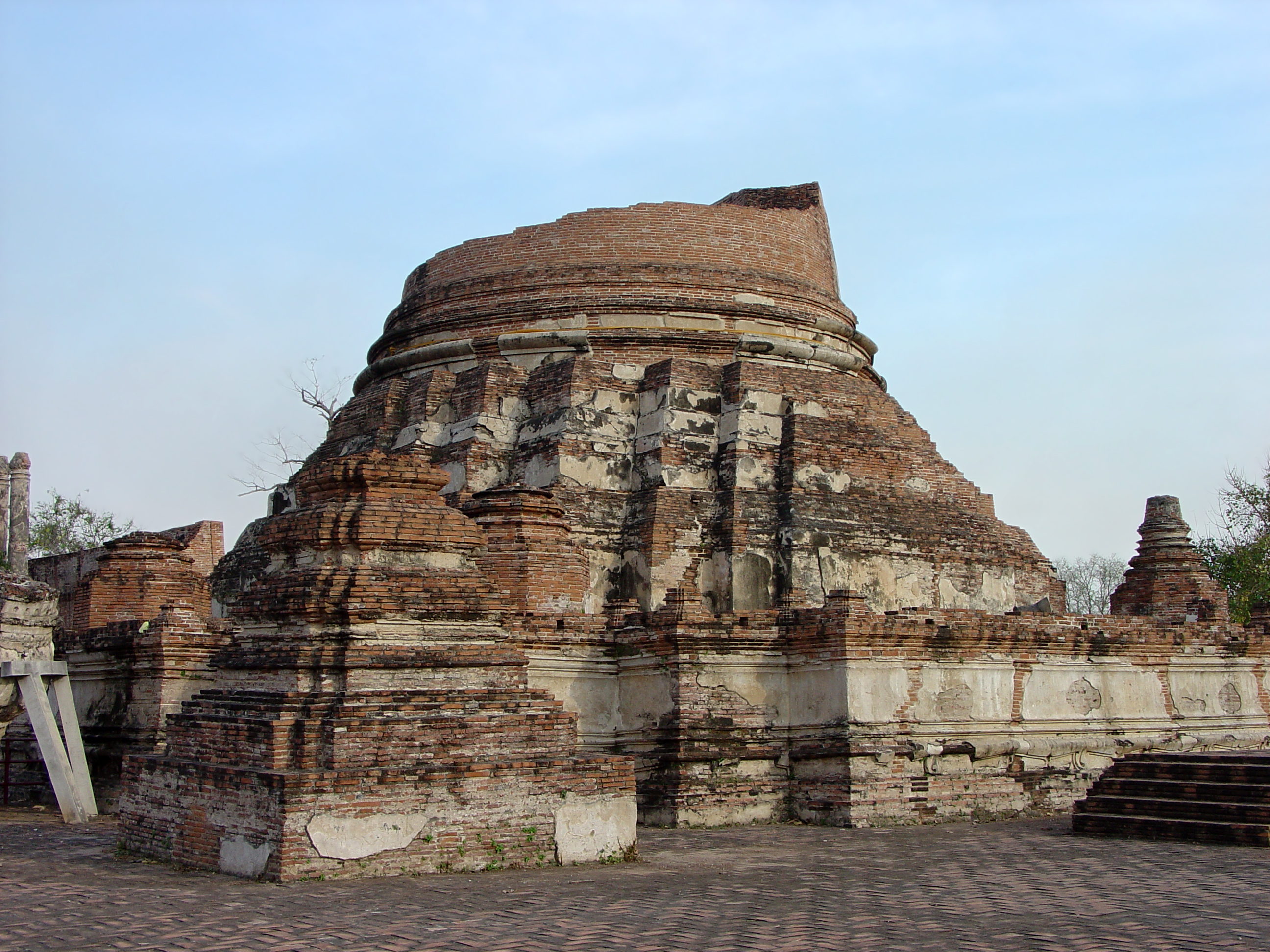
Principal Chedi of Wat Kudi Dao

Wat Kudi Dao (Thai: วัดกุฎีดาว) is a restored Buddhist temple located in the eastern area of Ayutthaya, Thailand, outside the main city island. It represents a significant example of Late Ayutthaya architecture and is historically linked to the Ban Phlu Luang dynasty.

== History ==
While the exact date of its original foundation is unclear, the temple underwent a major restoration in 1711 by King Thai Sa. The restoration project was supervised by the King's younger brother, Prince Boromakot (who served as the Front Palace), while the King himself simultaneously restored the nearby Wat Maheyong.

According to royal chronicles, the temple served as the residence of Phra Thep Muni (commonly known as Luang Pu Thuat), a high-ranking monk who acted as a spiritual advisor to Prince Boromakot. During the prince's stay at the temple to oversee construction, the site became a center for political gathering. It was here that negotiations concerning the royal succession took place, eventually leading to Boromakot's ascension to the throne.

Following the fall of Ayutthaya in 1767, the temple was abandoned and fell into ruin. In modern times, the Fine Arts Department has partially restored the site, stabilizing the structures for archaeological study and tourism.

== Architecture ==
The temple complex displays classic characteristics of the Late Ayutthaya style, noted for its elegance and the integration of foreign artistic influences.

Key structures include:

- Ubosot (Ordination Hall): Measuring 15.4 meters wide and 27.8 meters long, the hall sits on a curved base known as thong samphao (junk ship hull), a hallmark of the era. It features three entrances at the front and two at the rear. The windows and doors are decorated with elaborate arches.
- Viharn (Image Hall): Slightly smaller than the ubosot (14 x 27 meters), located to the west. It mirrors the design with two entrances at both the front and back.
- Principal Chedi: The main stupa is Bell-shaped in the Sri Lankan style. It is supported by a diminishing multi-tiered base and originally featured a spire with lotus bud motifs. The main stupa is surrounded by eight smaller satellite stupas.
- Tamnak Kammalian: Situated outside the main enclosure wall to the north, this two-story rectangular brick building is believed to have been the residence of Prince Boromakot during the restoration. Its architecture is distinct, featuring arched windows and entrances that reflect Persian or Western influence, which was fashionable in the Siamese court during the 17th and 18th centuries.
