= Kanchanaphisek =

Kanchanaphisek (Thai: กาญจนาภิเษก, from Sanskrit: kāñcana 'gold' + abhiṣeka 'anointment') is the Thai term for 'golden jubilee', used for the celebrations of the Golden Jubilee of Bhumibol Adulyadej in 1996.

Structures and places named Kanchanaphisek as part of the celebrations include:

- Kanchanaphisek Road, the outer ring road of Bangkok
- Kanchanaphisek Bridge, the road's crossing over the Chao Phraya River
- Kanchanaphisek National Museum, one of the national museums of Thailand
