= Bang Na Expressway =

Controlled-access highway

Coordinates: 13°39′40″N 100°39′50″E

Burapha Withi Expressway ทางพิเศษบูรพาวิถี
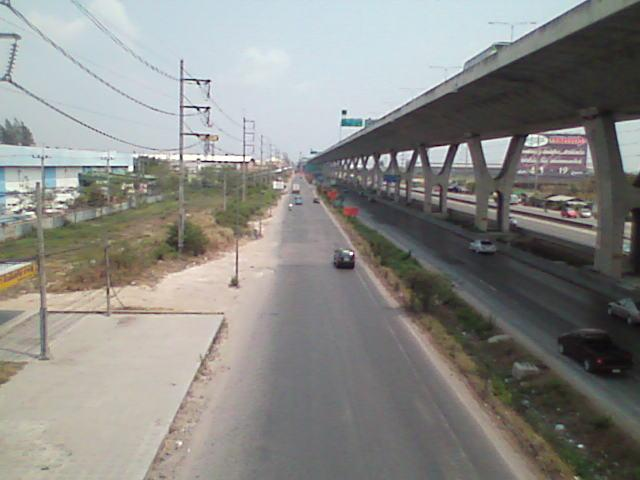
- The Bang Na Expressway is one of the longest bridges in the world.

Route information
- Length: 55 km (34 mi)
- Existed: 7 February 2000–present

Major junctions
- West end: S1 Expressway, Khlong Toei, Bangkok
- AH2 Bangkok Outer Ring Road, Wat Salut Interchange, Bang Phli District, Samut Prakan
- East end: Debaratna Road, Mueang Chon Buri, Chonburi

Location
- Country: Thailand
- Provinces: Bangkok, Samut Prakan, Chachoengsao, Chonburi

Highway system
- Highways in Thailand; Motorways; Asian Highways

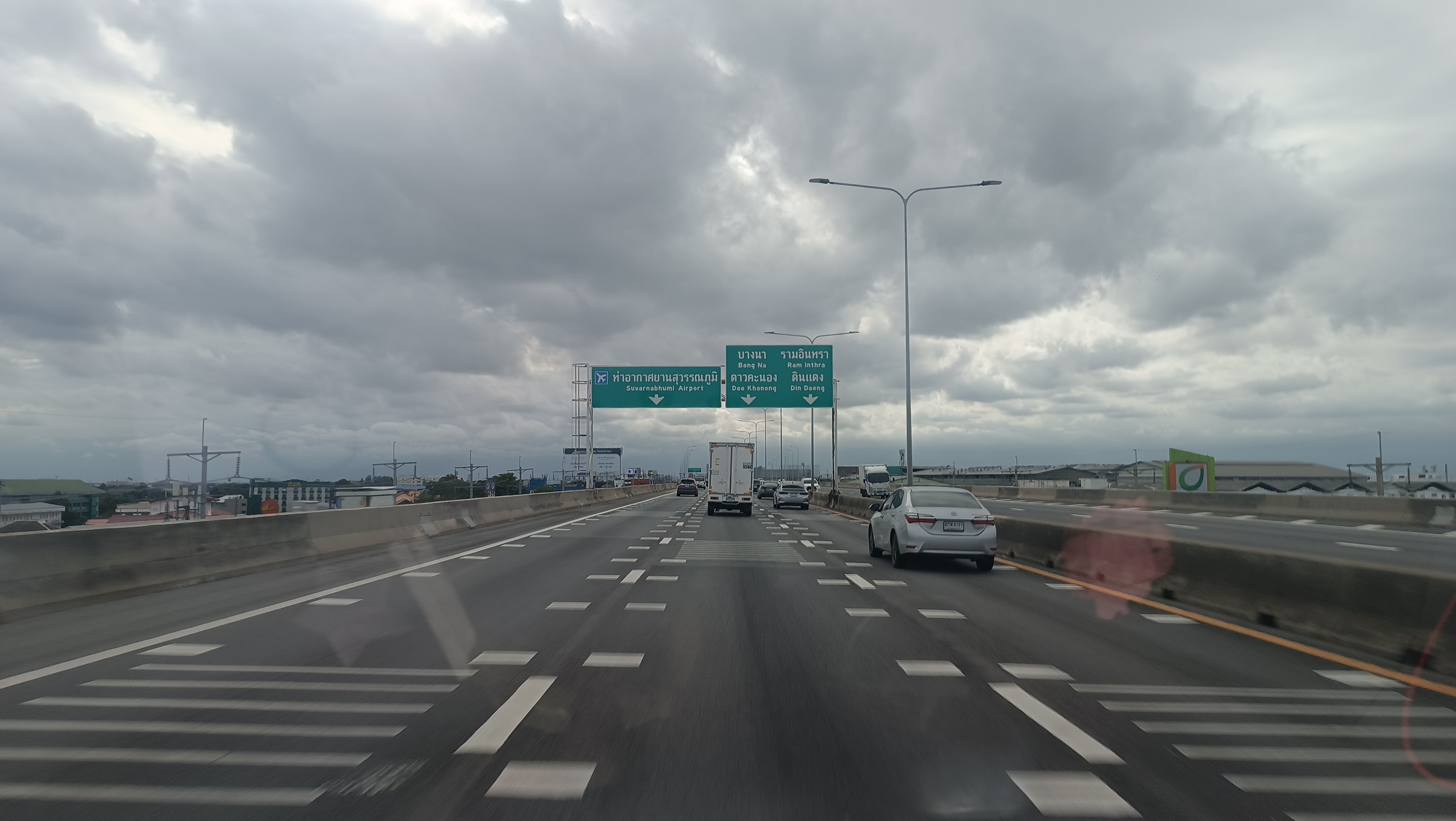
Burapha Withi Expressway

The Bang Na Expressway (full name: Bang Na – Bang Phli – Bang Pakong Expressway), officially Burapha Withi Expressway (Thai: ทางพิเศษบูรพาวิถี, lit. Road to the East), is a 55-kilometer-long (34 mi) six-lane elevated highway in Thailand. It is a toll road running above National Highway 34 (Debaratna Road, Bang Na–Trat Road) and is owned by the Expressway Authority of Thailand (EXAT).

== History ==
The Bang Na Expressway was conceived by the Expressway and Rapid Transit Authority of Thailand (ETA) and Sukavich Rangsitpol, deputy prime minister of Chuan Leekpai Cabinet (1992–1995). The structure was built using a design-build contracting method. The columns and superstructure were designed by Jean M. Muller (U.S.) and the alignment and foundations were designed by Asian Engineering Consultants (Thailand). The owner's designer and engineer was the late Louis Berger of the Louis Berger Group and the project was built by a joint venture of Bilfinger & Berger (Germany) and Ch. Karnchang (Thailand). It took 1,800,000 cubic metres (2,400,000 yd^{3}) of concrete to build the bridge. The bridge was completed in January 2000. The expressway was opened in its entirety on 7 February 2000.

== Structural description ==
The highway is elevated onto a viaduct that has an average span length of 42 metres (138 ft). It is a 27-metre-wide (89 ft) box girder bridge.

There are two toll plazas on the elevated structure where the structure must widen to accommodate twelve lanes. The toll system is done by Kapsch TrafficCom AB (Sweden).

=== Route ===
This expressway has toll plazas for both entry and exit. This table only displays toll plazas for entry onto the expressway.

Burapha Withi Expressway Bang Na – Chon Buri
Location	km	Westbound		Facility		Eastbound	
Location	km	Exit destinations (road)	Toll Plaza (Entry)	English	Thai	Toll Plaza (Entry)	Exit destinations (road)
Bangkok	0.00	Westbound - Tha Ruea, Dao Khanong, Rama IX Road, Ram Inthra Road ( S1 Expressway)	-	Bang Na Junction	ต่างระดับบางนา	no toll plaza (continues from S1)	-
Bangkok	2.00	Bang Na, CentralPlaza Bangna, BITEC ( Debaratna Road)	-	Bang Na Interchange	ต่างระดับบางนา	no toll plaza (uses Bang Na KM.6)	
Bangkok	6.00	Bang Na KM.6 Toll Plaza					
Bangkok	7.00	-	Bang Kaeo (Inbound)	Bang Kaeo Interchange	แยกทางด่วนบางแก้ว	-	Bang Kaeo, Ramkhamhaeng University Bang Na Campus ( Debaratna Road)
Bangkok	4.72	Northbound - Lat Krabang, Ram Inthra, Bang Pa-in ( East Kanchanaphisek Road)	Bang Kaeo 2	Wat Salut Junction	ต่างระดับวัดสลุด	Bang Kaeo 2	Southbound - Samut Prakan, Phra Pradaeng, Rama II Road (Kanchanaphisek Expressway)
Bangkok	4.72	Northbound - Lat Krabang, Ram Inthra, Bang Pa-in ( East Kanchanaphisek Road)	Bang Kaeo 3	Wat Salut Junction	ต่างระดับวัดสลุด	Bang Kaeo 3	Southbound - Samut Prakan, Phra Pradaeng, Rama II Road (Kanchanaphisek Expressway)
Bangkok	4.72	Northbound - Lat Krabang, Ram Inthra, Bang Pa-in ( East Kanchanaphisek Road)	Bang Kaeo 3	Wat Salut Junction	ต่างระดับวัดสลุด	Outer Ring Road (Bang Kaeo)	Southbound - Samut Prakan, Phra Pradaeng, Rama II Road (Kanchanaphisek Expressway)
Bangkok	11.00	-	Bang Phli 1	Bang Phli 1 Interchange	แยกทางด่วนบางพลี 1	-	Bang Phli (King Kaeo Road)
Bangkok	13.00	Lat Krabang (King Kaeo Road)	-	Bang Phli 2 Interchange	แยกทางด่วนบางพลี 2	Bang Phli 2	-
Bangkok	15.00	Suvarnabhumi Airport, Krirk University (Suvarnabhumi 3 Road)	Suvarnabhumi 1	Suvarnabhumi Interchange	แยกทางด่วนสุวรรณภูมิ	Suvarnabumi 2	-
Bangkok	19.00	-	Mueang Mai Bang Phli	Mueang Mai Bang Phli Interchange	แยกทางด่วนเมืองใหม่บางพลี	-	Bang Phli New Town, Bang Phli Industrial Estate, Chakri Naruebodindra Medical Institute (Debaratna Road)
Bangkok	25.00	-	Bang Sao Thong	Bang Sao Thong Interchange	แยกทางด่วนบางเสาธง	-	Bang Sao Thong (Debaratna Road)
Bangkok	30.00	Bang Bo (Debaratna Road)	-	Bang Bo Interchange	แยกทางด่วนบางบ่อ	Bang Bo	-
Bangkok	33.00	-	Bang Phli Noi	Bang Phli Noi Interchange	แยกทางด่วนบางพลีน้อย	-	Bang Phli Noi (Debaratna Road)
Chachoengsao	38.00	-	Bang Samak	Bang Samak Interchange	แยกทางด่วนบางสมัคร	-	Bang Samak, Chachoengsao, Motorway 7 (Debaratna Road, Bangkok Chonburi New Frontage Road)
Chachoengsao	42.00	Bang Wua, Chachoengsao, Motorway 7 (Debaratna Road, Bangkok Chonburi New Frontage Road)	-	Bang Wua Interchange	แยกทางด่วนบางวัว	Bang Wua	-
Chachoengsao	45.00	-	Bang Pakong 1	Bang Pakong 1 Interchange	แยกทางด่วนบางปะกง 1	-	Bang Pakong, Chachoengsao (Debaratna Road, Highway 314, Sukhumvit Road)
Chachoengsao	47.00	Bang Pakong, Chachoengsao (Debaratna Road, Highway 314, Sukhumvit Road)	-	Bang Pakong 2 Interchange	แยกทางด่วนบางปะกง 2	Bang Pakong 2	-
Chonburi	54.00	-	Chonburi	Chonburi Interchange	แยกทางด่วนชลบุรี	-	Chonburi, Phan Thong ( Sukhumvit Road)

== Records ==
The world's longest car bridge, the Bang Na Expressway held the title of the world's longest bridge from 2000 until 2008. Today, it is the seventh longest bridge in the world.

== See also ==
- List of bridges by length
- List of bridge megaprojects
- Expressway
- Controlled-access highways in Thailand

Records
Preceded by Lake Pontchartrain Causeway	World's longest bridge 2000 – 2004	Succeeded by Changhua-Kaohsiung Viaduct
Preceded by Lake Pontchartrain Causeway	World's longest car bridge 2000– present	Incumbent
