= Chalong Rat Expressway =

Highway in Bangkok, Thailand

Chalong Rat Expressway ทางพิเศษฉลองรัช

Route information
- Maintained by Expressway Authority of Thailand
- Length: 28.2 km (17.5 mi)
- Existed: 6 October 1996–present

At Narong–Ram Inthra
- Length: 18.7 km (11.6 mi)
- North end: Ram Inthra Road (Ram Inthra Interchange)
- Major intersections: Chaloem Maha Nakhon Expressway, S1 Expressway
- South end: At Narong Junction

Ram Inthra–Outer Ring Road (West)
- Length: 9.5 km (5.9 mi)
- North end: Outer Ring Road (East) (Kanchanaphisek Road)
- Major intersections: Si Rat Expressway
- South end: Ram Inthra Road (Ram Inthra Interchange)

Location
- Country: Thailand

Highway system
- Highways in Thailand; Motorways; Asian Highways

The Chalong Rat Expressway (Thai: ทางพิเศษฉลองรัช) is an expressway in Thailand, located in Bangkok. It is 27.1 kilometres in length. The expressway has played an important role in alleviating ground-level road traffic in Bangkok. The expressway is a controlled-access toll road.

== History ==
Due to a significant increase in road traffic on the Chaloem Maha Nakhon Expressway and heavy ground-level road traffic on the Lat Phrao, Phra Ram 9 and Ram Inthra roads, an expressway was proposed in order to alleviate this. The Expressway Authority of Thailand (EXAT) was tasked to construct this expressway, of which the first section between was opened Ram Inthra–At Narong on 6 October 1996. This connected Ram Inthra Road with the Chaloem Maha Nakhon Expressway at At Narong Junction. The second section between Ram Inthra–Outer Ring Road (East) was opened on 23 March 2009 and connected Ram Inthra Road with Outer Ring Road (East), or Kanchanaphisek Road.

According to an official EXAT annual report, the expressway was used by 70,559,374 cars in the 2022 fiscal year, with an average of 193,314 cars per day.

In July 2024, a planned extension, EXAT moved forward with the northern expansion of the Chalong Rat Expressway, awarding the Chatu Chot–Lam Luk Ka extension contract to Italianthai Development. The project, valued at ฿18.70 billion, involves building an elevated link to connect the current terminus with Pathum Thani.

The construction is scheduled to take about three years. ITD secured the project by narrowly outbidding other major firms including Ch. Karnchang, Sino-Thai, and Unique Engineering. This 16.2-kilometer segment serves as the initial phase of the expressway's eventual reach toward Nakhon Nayok and Saraburi.

== Route ==
Kilometre 0 is counted at At Narong Junction.

Chalong Rat Expressway; At Narong – Ram Inthra
Location	km	Northbound		Facility		Southbound	
Location	km	Exit destinations (road)	Toll Plaza (Entry)	English	Thai	Toll Plaza (Entry)	Exit destinations (road)
Bangkok	0.00	Westbound - Tha Ruea, Dao Khanong ( S1 Expressway)	At Narong 2 (from Chaloem Maha Nakhon)	At Narong Junction	ต่างระดับอาจณรงค์	At Narong 1 (from Chaloem Maha Nakhon)	Eastbound - Bang Na ( Chaloem Maha Nakhon Expressway)
Bangkok	0.00	Westbound - Tha Ruea, Dao Khanong ( S1 Expressway)	At Narong 2 (from Chaloem Maha Nakhon)	At Narong Junction	ต่างระดับอาจณรงค์	no toll plaza	Eastbound - Bang Na, Burapha Withi Expressway ( S1 Expressway)
Bangkok	1.10	-	Phra Khanong	Sukhumvit 50 Interchange	แยกทางด่วนสุขุมวิท 50	-	Sukhumvit 50 Road, On Nut, Paknam Railway Road (Sukhumvit 50 Road)
Bangkok	4.72	Khlong Tan (Phatthanakan Road)	Phatthanakan 2	Phatthanakan Interchange	แยกทางด่วนพัฒนาการ	Phatthanakan 1	Hua Mak (Phatthanakan Road)
Bangkok	6.70	Eastbound - Srinagarindra Road, Suvarnabhumi Airport ( Si Rat Expressway)	Phra Ram 9-1 (From Si Rat)	Ramkhamhaeng Junction	ต่างระดับรามคำแหง	Phra Ram 9-1 (To Si Rat)	Westbound - Din Daeng, Chaeng Watthana ( Si Rat Expressway)
Bangkok	8.49	Pracha Uthit, Phra Ram 9 Road (Pradit Manutham Road)	Phra Ram 9-2	Pracha Uthit Interchange	แยกทางด่วนประชาอุทิศ	Pracha Uthit	Phra Ram 9 Road, Ekkamai (Pradit Manutham Road)
Bangkok	10.81	-	Lat Phrao	Lat Phrao Interchange	แยกทางด่วนลาดพร้าว	-	Chokchai 4, Bang Kapi (Lat Phrao Road)
Bangkok	15.65	Lat Pla Khao, Kasetsart University, Nawamin Road ( Prasert Manukit Road)	-	Yothin Phatthana Interchange	แยกทางด่วนโยธินพัฒนา	Yothin Phatthana	-
Bangkok	18.72	Lak Si ( Ram Inthra Road)	Ram Inthra 1	Ram Inthra / Watcharaphon Interchange	แยกทางด่วนรามอินทรา/วัชรพล	Ram Inthra	Min Buri ( Ram Inthra Road)
Ram Inthra – Outer Ring Road (East)
Location	km	Northbound		Facility		Southbound	
Location	km	Exit destinations (road)	Toll Plaza (Entry)	English	Thai	Toll Plaza (Entry)	Exit destinations (road)
Bangkok	18.72	Lak Si ( Ram Inthra Road)	Ram Inthra 1	Ram Inthra / Watcharaphon Interchange	แยกทางด่วนรามอินทรา/วัชรพล	Ram Inthra	Min Buri ( Ram Inthra Road)
Bangkok	22.85	Sai Mai (Sukhaphiban 5 Road)	Sukhaphiban 5-2	Sukhaphiban 5 Interchange	แยกทางด่วนสุขาภิบาล 5	Sukhaphiban 5-1	Watcharaphon Intersection (Sukhaphiban 5 Road)
Bangkok	27.90	Lam Luk Ka, Bang Pa-in ( AH2 Kanchanaphisek)	-	Chatuchot Junction	ต่างระดับจตุโชติ	Chatuchot	Bang Phli ( AH2 Kanchanaphisek)

== See also ==
- Controlled-access highways in Thailand
- Expressway Authority of Thailand
