= S1 Expressway (Thailand) =

Controlled-access highway in Thailand

S1 Expressway ทางพิเศษสาย S1
- Bang Na–At Narong Expressway ทางพิเศษสายบางนา–อาจณรงค์

Route information
- Maintained by Expressway Authority of Thailand
- Length: 4.7 km (2.9 mi)
- Existed: 15 June 2005–present

Major junctions
- West end: Chaloem Maha Nakhon Expressway, Chalong Rat Expressway
- East end: Burapha Withi Expressway

Location
- Country: Thailand

Highway system
- Highways in Thailand; Motorways; Asian Highways

The S1 Expressway (Thai: ทางพิเศษสาย S1), also known as the Bang Na–At Narong Expressway (Thai: ทางพิเศษสายบางนา–อาจณรงค์), is an expressway in Thailand, located in Bangkok. It is 4.7 kilometres in length. The expressway is a controlled-access toll road.

== History ==
The S1 Expressway was opened on 15 June 2005 to provide an elevated road connection between the Chaloem Maha Nakhon and Chalong Rat Expressways to the Buraphi Withi Expressway. It has a single toll plaza, the Bang Chak toll plaza, for cars travelling from the S1 onto the Chaloem Maha Nakhon. Cars can travel to and from the Chalong Rat with no intermediate toll plaza (pay at exit).

== See also ==
- Controlled-access highways in Thailand
- Expressway Authority of Thailand
