= Chaloem Maha Nakhon Expressway =

Highway in Bangkok, Thailand

Chaloem Maha Nakhon Expressway ทางพิเศษเฉลิมมหานคร
- First Stage Expressway System ระบบทางด่วนขั้นที่ 1
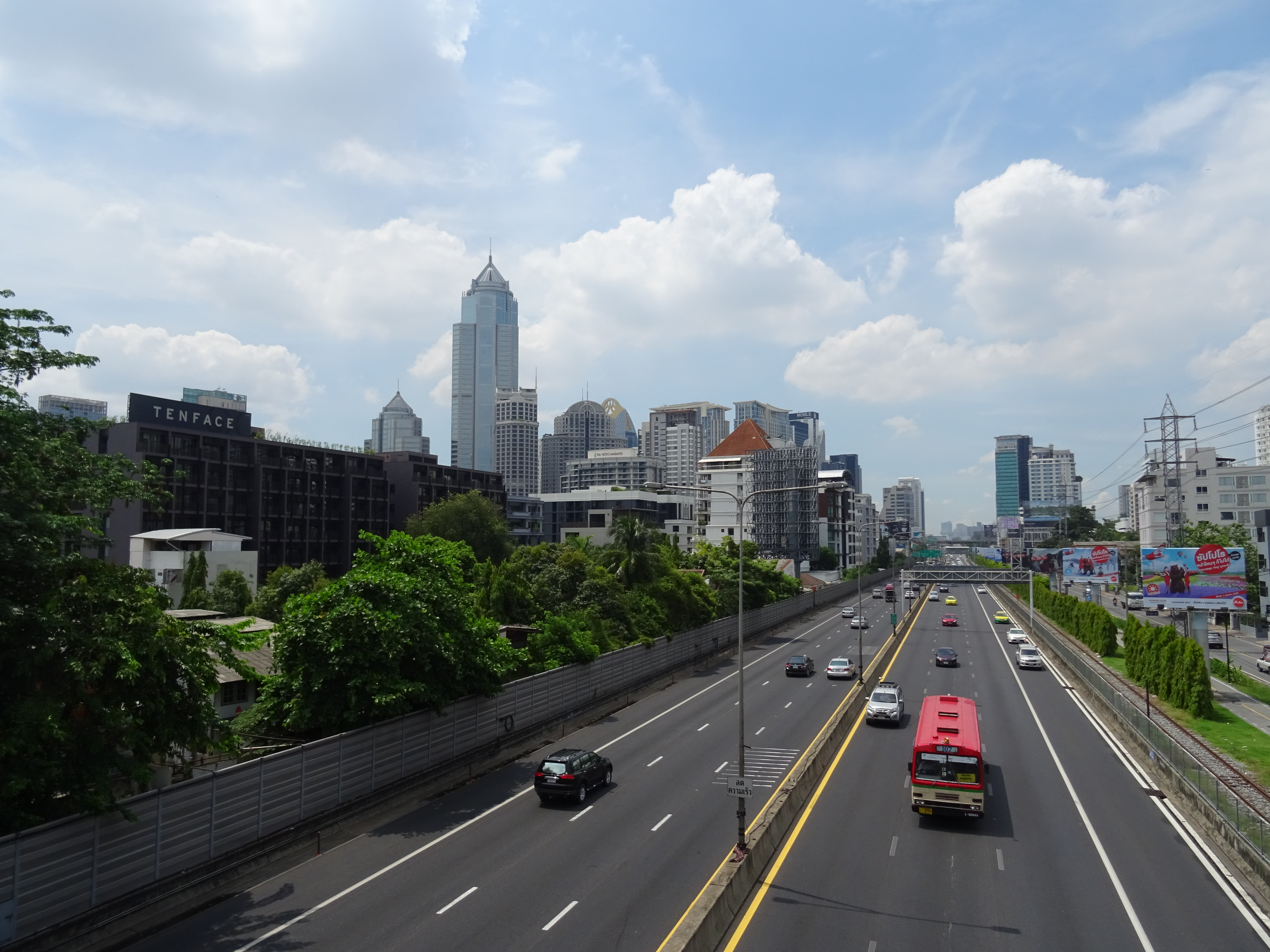

Route information
- Maintained by Expressway Authority of Thailand
- Length: 27.1 km (16.8 mi)
- Existed: 29 October 1981–present

Din Daeng–Tha Ruea
- Length: 8.9 km (5.5 mi)
- North end: Vibhavadi Rangsit Road / Don Mueang Tollway
- Major intersections: Si Rat Expressway
- South end: Tha Ruea Junction

Tha Ruea–Bang Na
- Length: 7.9 km (4.9 mi)
- West end: Tha Ruea Junction
- Major intersections: Chalong Rat Expressway
- East end: Debaratna Road

Tha Ruea–Dao Khanong
- Length: 10.3 km (6.4 mi)
- East end: Tha Ruea Junction
- Major intersections: Si Rat Expressway
- West end: Rama II Road

Location
- Country: Thailand

Highway system
- Highways in Thailand; Motorways; Asian Highways

The Chaloem Maha Nakhon Expressway (Thai: ทางพิเศษเฉลิมมหานคร), also known as the First Stage Expressway System (Thai: ระบบทางด่วนขั้นที่ 1), is an expressway in Thailand, located in Bangkok. It is the first expressway to be opened in the country and is 27.1 kilometres in length. The expressway has played an important role in alleviating ground-level road traffic in Bangkok. The expressway is a controlled-access toll road.

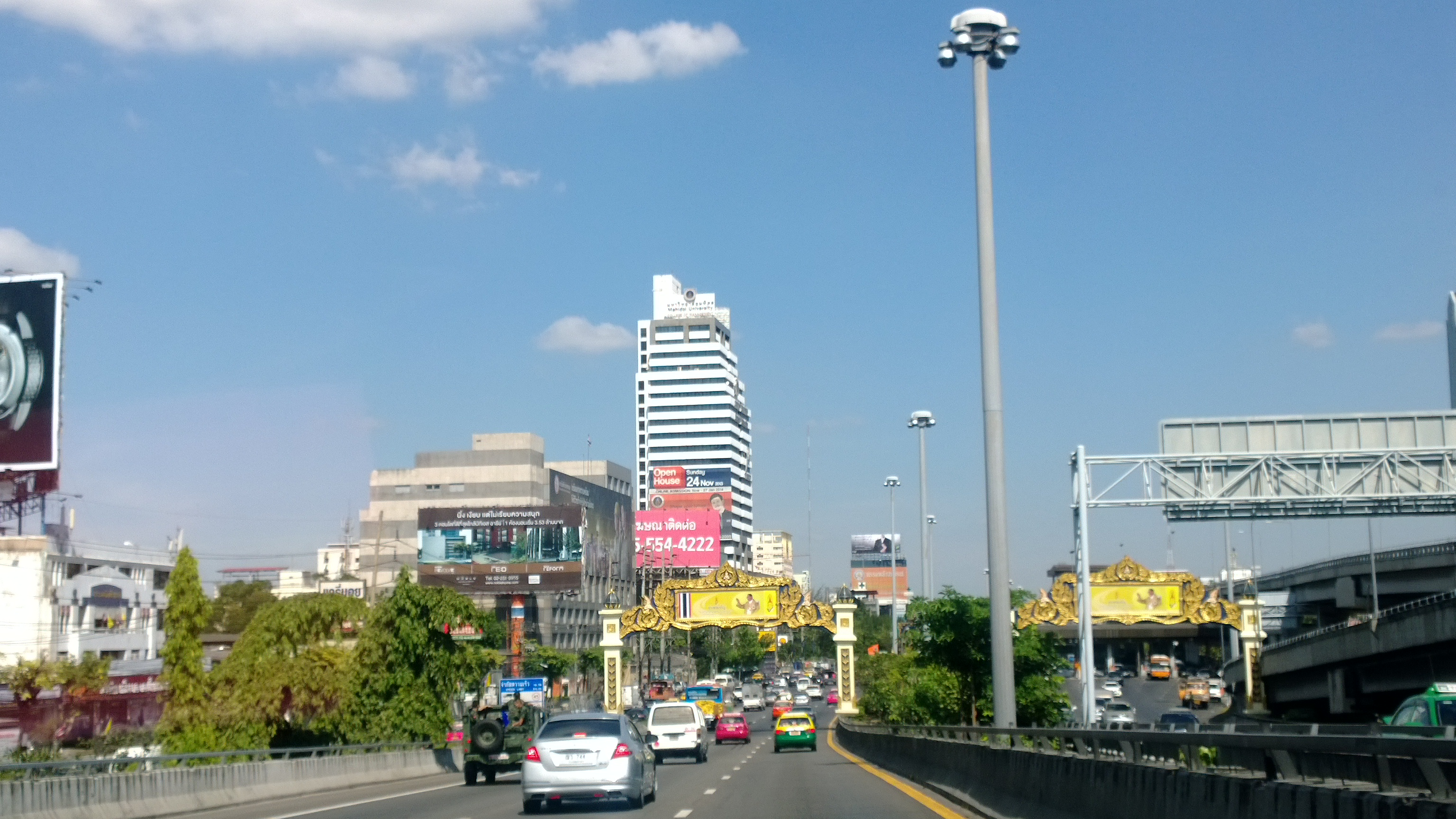
Din Daeng Interchange

Rama IX Bridge, is part of the Tha Ruea–Dao Khanong expressway section.

== History ==
Chaloem Maha Nakhon Expressway in 1998

Due to a significant increase in road traffic in the Bangkok Metropolitan Region, an expressway system was proposed in order to alleviate the heavy ground-level road traffic and in preparation for the predicted increase in car usage. The Expressway Authority of Thailand (EXAT) was tasked to construct Thailand's first expressway in 1978 to connect three main highways leading out of Bangkok to the outlying provinces. This was Vibhavadi Rangsit Road to the north, Debaratna Road to the east and Rama II Road (Thonburi - Pak Tho Road) to the south. A total of 8.51 billion baht was invested in the project, with mainly government funding and some funding from Japan International Cooperation Agency (JICA).

The first section between Din Daeng–Tha Ruea was completed and unofficially opened on 29 October 1981. It was officially opened on 4 January 1982. Its northern end terminated at Vibhavadi Rangsit Road in Din Daeng district and its southern end terminated at Tha Ruea (Port) Junction near Bangkok Port in Khlong Toei district. The second section between Tha Ruea–Bang Na was opened on 17 January 1983 and connected Tha Ruea Junction to Debaratna Road in Bang Na district. The third section between Tha Ruea–Dao Khanong was opened on 5 December 1987 and connected Tha Ruea Junction to Rama II Road in Chom Thong district.

Due to increased road traffic on the expressway, Rama IX Bridge was expanded in 2020 and is expected to be completed in 2023.

According to an official EXAT annual report, the expressway was used by 104,765,797 cars in the 2022 fiscal year, with an average of 302,791 cars per day.

On 15 March 2025, a section of the bridge outbound to Rama II Road was collapsed after concrete beam for new expressway bridge which is still under construction at a time and build on the top of the existing expressway crashing down, which resulted of the bridge section under it fall to the ground.

The collapse ended up with 7 killed, 16 injured and 30 missing as a result. Expressway's car traffic for both inbound and outbound between Rama II Road and Suksawat Road are immediately disrupted from the incident. EXAT announced temporary closure of the section and provide alternative routes until further notices shortly after. The collapsed section of the expressway outbound was repaired and already opened to the public on 5th of the April.

== Route ==
Kilometre 0 is counted at Din Daeng Interchange.

Chaloem Maha Nakhon Expressway; Din Daeng – Tha Ruea
Location	km	Northbound		Facility		Southbound	
Location	km	Exit destinations (road)	Toll Plaza (Entry)	English	Thai	Toll Plaza (Entry)	Exit destinations (road)
Bangkok	0.00	Sutthisan, Don Mueang (Vibhavadi Rangsit Road)	-	Din Daeng Interchange	แยกดินแดง	Din Daeng	-
Bangkok	0.00	Don Mueang International Airport, Rangsit (Uttaraphimuk Elevated Tollway)	-	Din Daeng Interchange	แยกดินแดง	Din Daeng 1	-
Bangkok	2.20	Eastbound - Asok, Phra Ram 9, Suvarnabhumi Airport ( Si Rat Expressway)	-	Makkasan Junction	ต่างระดับมักกะสัน	-	Westbound - Victory Monument, Chaeng Watthana, Dao Khanong ( Si Rat Expressway)
Bangkok	3.70	Pratunam Intersection, Asok-Phetchaburi Intersection (Phetchaburi Road)	-	Phetchaburi Interchange	แยกทางด่วนเพชรบุรี	Phetchaburi	no exit
Bangkok	4.45	-	Sukhumvit	Phloen Chit Interchange	แยกทางด่วนเพลินจิต	-	North Phloen Chit, Nana, Asok Montri Intersection ( Sukhumvit Road)
Bangkok	4.45	-	Sukhumvit	Phloen Chit Interchange	แยกทางด่วนเพลินจิต	-	South Phloen Chit, Lumphini Park (Duang Phithak Road)
Bangkok	6.65	Lumphini (Rama IV Road)	Phra Ram 4-2	Phra Ram 4 Interchange	แยกทางด่วนพระราม 4	Phra Ram 4-1	Khlong Toei (Rama IV Road)
Bangkok	7.40	Eastbound - Tha Ruea – Bang Na section	-	Tha Ruea Junction	ต่างระดับท่าเรือ	-	Westbound - Tha Ruea – Dao Khanong section
Tha Ruea – Bang Na
Location	km	Eastbound		Facility		Westbound	
Location	km	Exit destinations (road)	Toll Plaza (Entry)	English	Thai	Toll Plaza (Entry)	Exit destinations (road)
Bangkok	7.40	Northbound - Din Daeng – Tha Ruea section	-	Tha Ruea Junction	ต่างระดับท่าเรือ	-	Westbound - Tha Ruea – Dao Khanong section
Bangkok	10.75	Sunlakakorn Intersection (Kasem Rat Road)	Tha Ruea 2	Tha Ruea Interchange	แยกทางด่วนท่าเรือ	Tha Ruea 1	Bangkok Port (Kasem Rat Road)
Bangkok	12.30	At Narong Intersection, Kluai Nam Thai Intersection (At Narong Road)	-	At Narong Interchange	แยกทางด่วนอาจณรงค์	At Narong	-
Bangkok	14.25	Eastbound - Suvarnabhumi Airport, Bang Phli, Chonburi ( S1 Expressway)	At Narong 1 (from Chalong Rat)	At Narong Junction	ต่างระดับอาจณรงค์	At Narong 2 (to Chalong Rat)	Northbound - Khlong Tan, Phra Ram 9, Ram-inthra ( Chalong Rat Expressway)
Bangkok	14.25	Eastbound - Suvarnabhumi Airport, Bang Phli, Chonburi ( S1 Expressway)	At Narong 1 (from Chalong Rat)	At Narong Junction	ต่างระดับอาจณรงค์	At Narong 3	Northbound - Khlong Tan, Phra Ram 9, Ram-inthra ( Chalong Rat Expressway)
Bangkok	15.25	Bang Chak (Sukhumvit 62 Road)	-	Sukhumvit 62 Interchange	แยกทางด่วนสุขุมวิท 62	Sukhumvit 62	-
Bangkok	17.95	Suvarnabhumi Airport, Bang Phli, Chonburi ( Debaratna Road)	-	Bang Na Interchange	แยกบางนา	Bang Chak (from S1)	-
Bangkok	17.95	Samrong, Samut Prakan, Chonburi ( Sukhumvit Road)	-	Bang Na Interchange	แยกบางนา	Bang Na	-
Tha Ruea – Dao Khanong
Location	km	Eastbound		Facility		Westbound	
Location	km	Exit destinations (road)	Toll Plaza (Entry)	English	Thai	Toll Plaza (Entry)	Exit destinations (road)
Bangkok	7.40	Eastbound - Tha Ruea – Bang Na section	-	Tha Ruea Junction	ต่างระดับท่าเรือ	-	Northbound - Din Daeng – Tha Ruea section
Bangkok	10.50	-	Liap Mae Nam	Mae Nam Interchange	แยกทางด่วนเเม่น้ำ	-	Chong Nonsi, Nang Linchi Road (Rama III Road)
Bangkok	12.60	Chan Road, Nang Linchi Road (Sathu Pradit Road)	Sathu Pradit 1	Sathu Pradit Interchange	แยกทางด่วนสาธุประดิษฐ์	-	-
Bangkok	13.55	Northbound - Si Lom, Chaeng Watthana ( Si Rat Expressway)	-	Bang Khlo Junction	ต่างระดับบางโคล่	Sathu Pradit 2	-
Bangkok	14.97	Rama IX Bridge					
Bangkok	16.55	Bang Pakok (Suk Sawat Road)	Suk Sawat	Suk Sawat Interchange	แยกทางด่วนสุขสวัสดิ์	-	Phra Pradaeng (Suk Sawat Road)
Bangkok	20.55	-	Dao Khanong	Dao Khanong Interchange	แยกดาวคะนอง	-	Dao Khanong, Samut Sakhon (Rama II Road)
Bangkok	20.55	-	Dao Khanong	Dao Khanong Interchange	แยกดาวคะนอง	-	Bang Pakaeo Intersection (Rama II Road)

== See also ==
- Controlled-access highways in Thailand
- Expressway Authority of Thailand
