= Controlled-access highways in Thailand =

Controlled-accsess highways (ทางด่วน/ทางพิเศษ)

System information
- Maintained by Department of Highways, Expressway Authority of Thailand

Highway names

System links
- Highways in Thailand; Motorways; Asian Highways

Thai Expressways as of 2017

Controlled-access highways in Thailand are systems that can be used only by cars, trucks, and certain types of buses, forming a spider-web network around the Greater Bangkok area and eventually covering the entire country. Currently, there are three different systems in Thailand. The first system, known as the "Intercity Motorway," is owned and operated by the Department of Highways. The second system is the "Expressway," which is owned by the Expressway Authority of Thailand (EXAT) and operated by the Bangkok Expressway and Metro Public Company (BEM), with some expressway routes directly operated by the EXAT itself. The third system is the "Concession Highway," commonly known as the "Tollway," which is owned by the Department of Highways but operated by a private company. The Tollway currently has one route, the Don Mueang Tollway, operated by the Don Mueang Tollway Public Company.

The first controlled-access highway in Thailand is the Din Daeng - Tha Ruea section of the Chaloem Maha Nakhon Expressway, opened on 29 October 1981, linking Vibhavadhi Rangsit Road to Bangkok Port with a total distance of 8.9 kilometers.

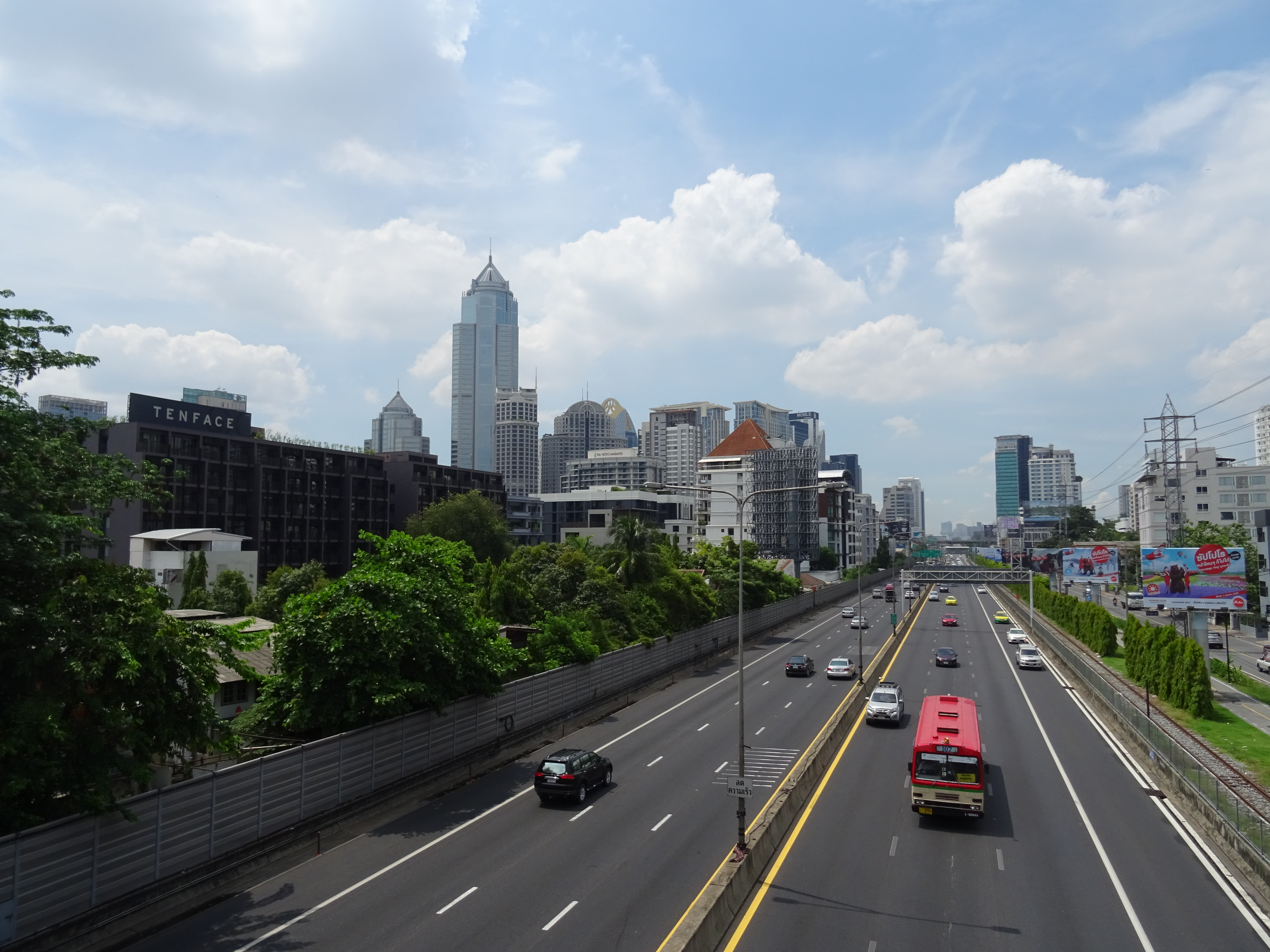
Din Daeng - Tha Ruea section of the Chaloem Maha Nakhon Expressway, the first expressway in Thailand.

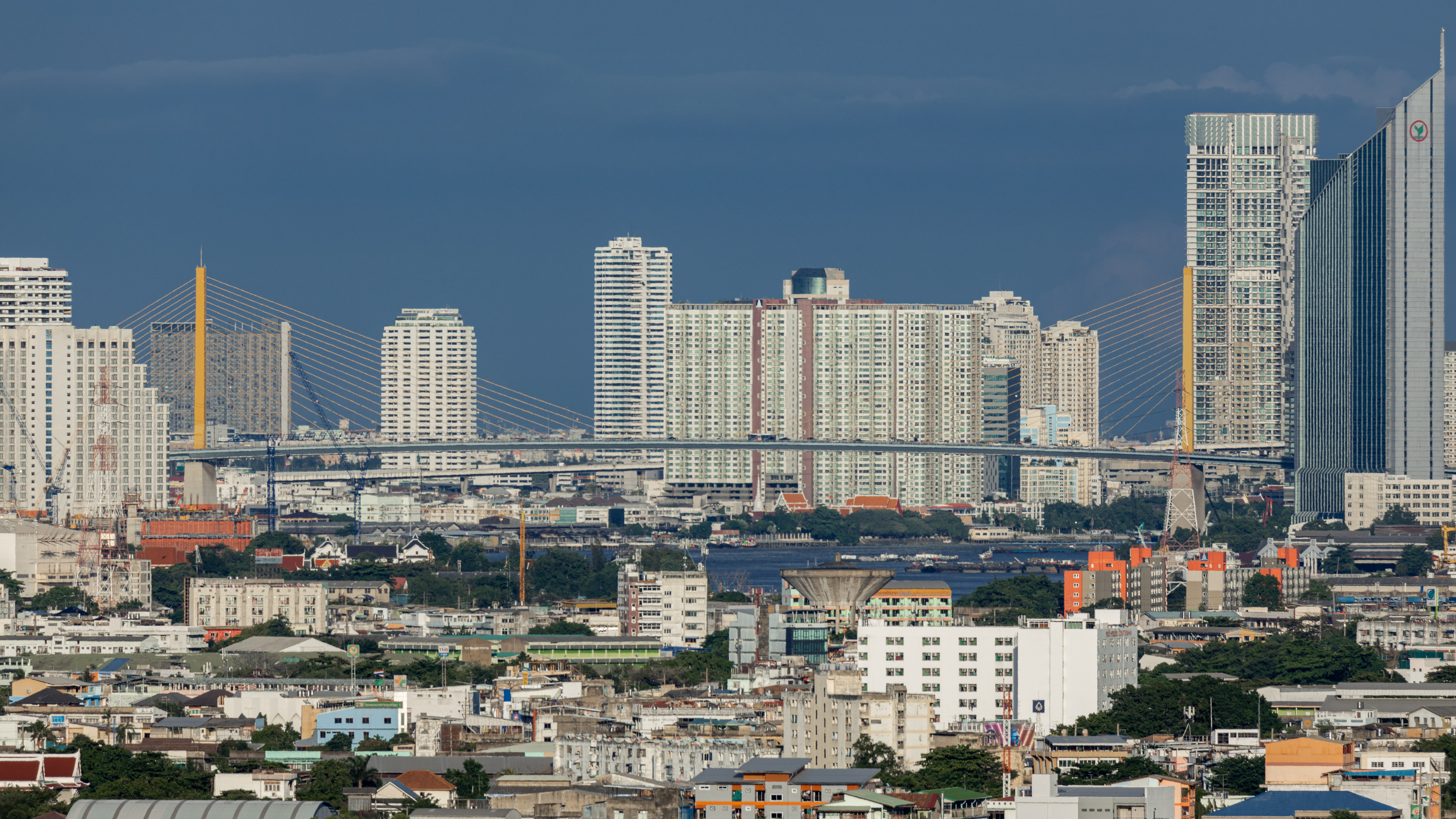
Rama IX Bridge is the part of Tha Ruea - Dao Khanong section of the Chaloem Maha Nakhon Expressway, opened on 22 November 1987.

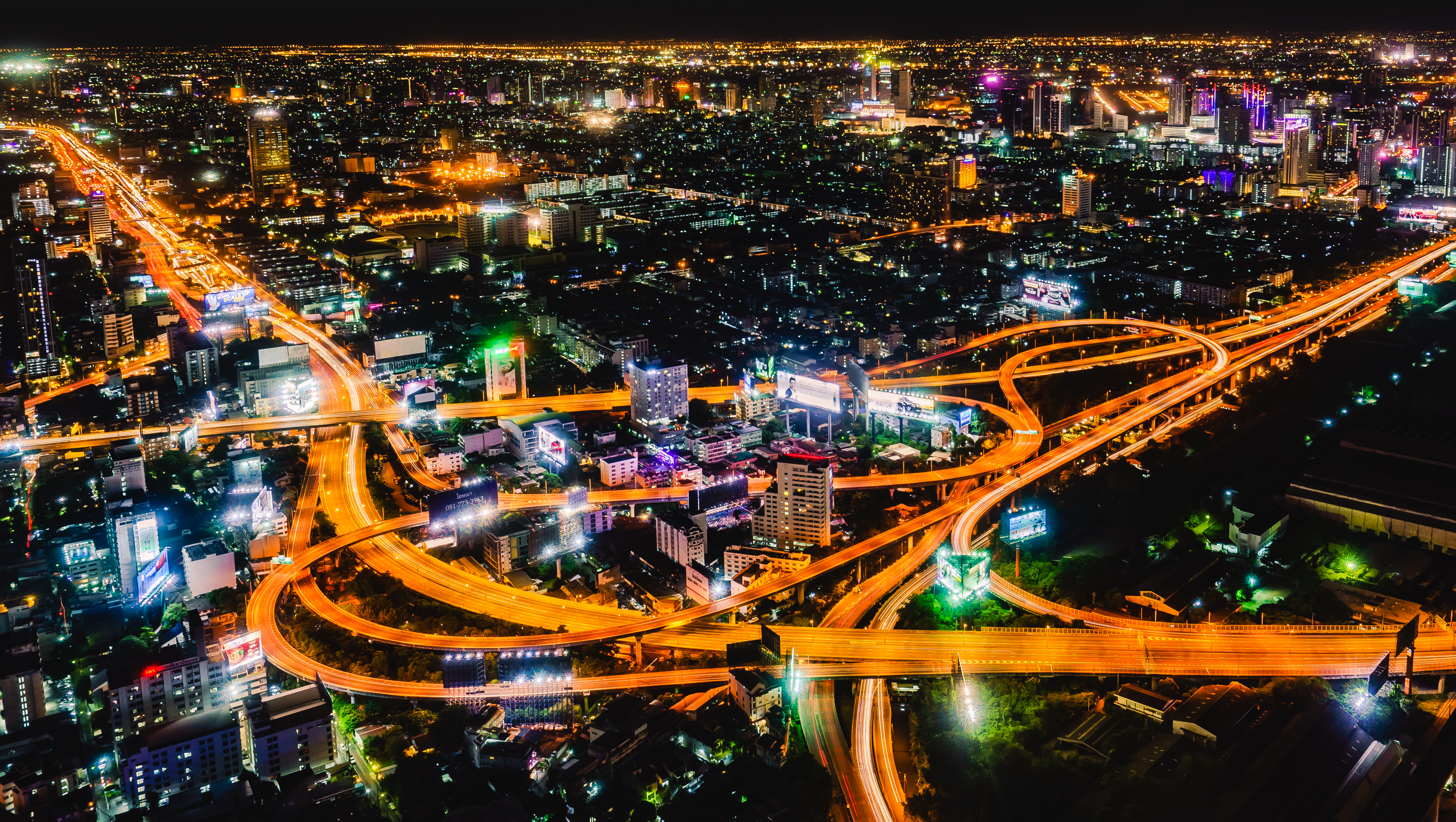
Makkasan Interchange of Chaloem Maha Nakhon Expressway and Si Rat Expressway.

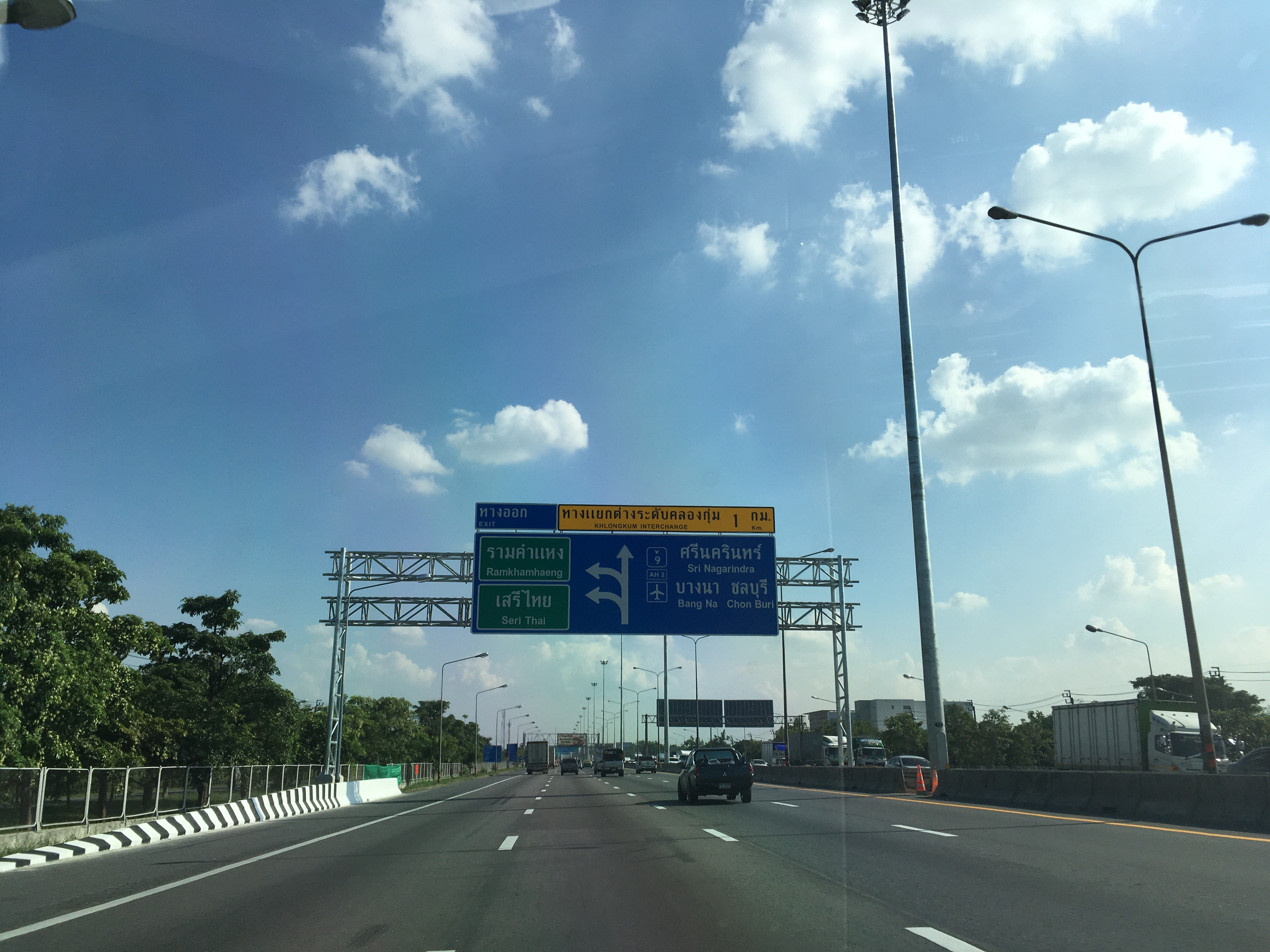
Intercity Motorway No.9, known as Kanchanaphisek Road or Bangkok's 2nd Outer Ring Road.
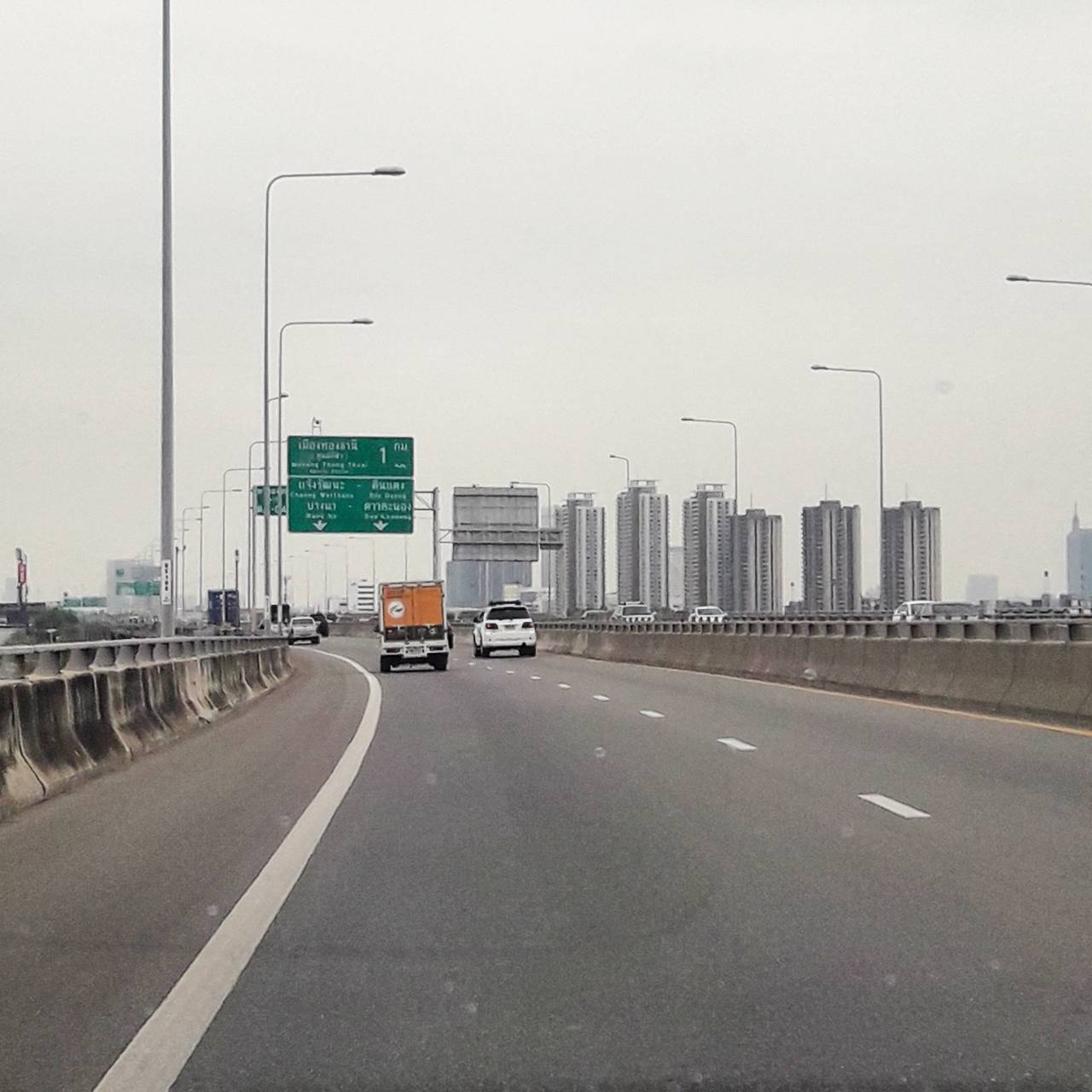
Udon Ratthaya Expressway also known as Bang Pa In - Pakkret Expressway.

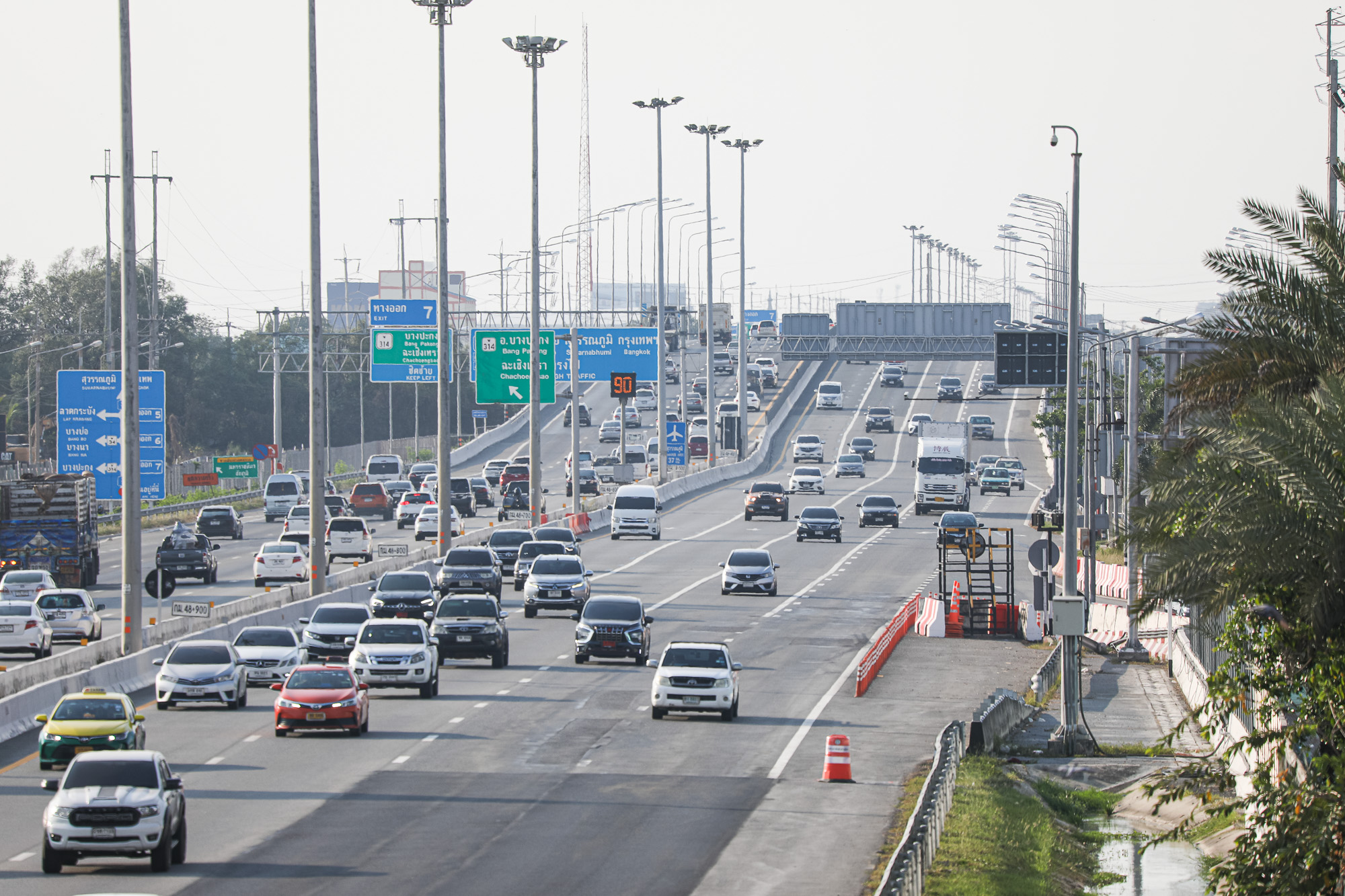
Intercity Motorway No.7, the motorway linking between Bangkok and Pattaya.

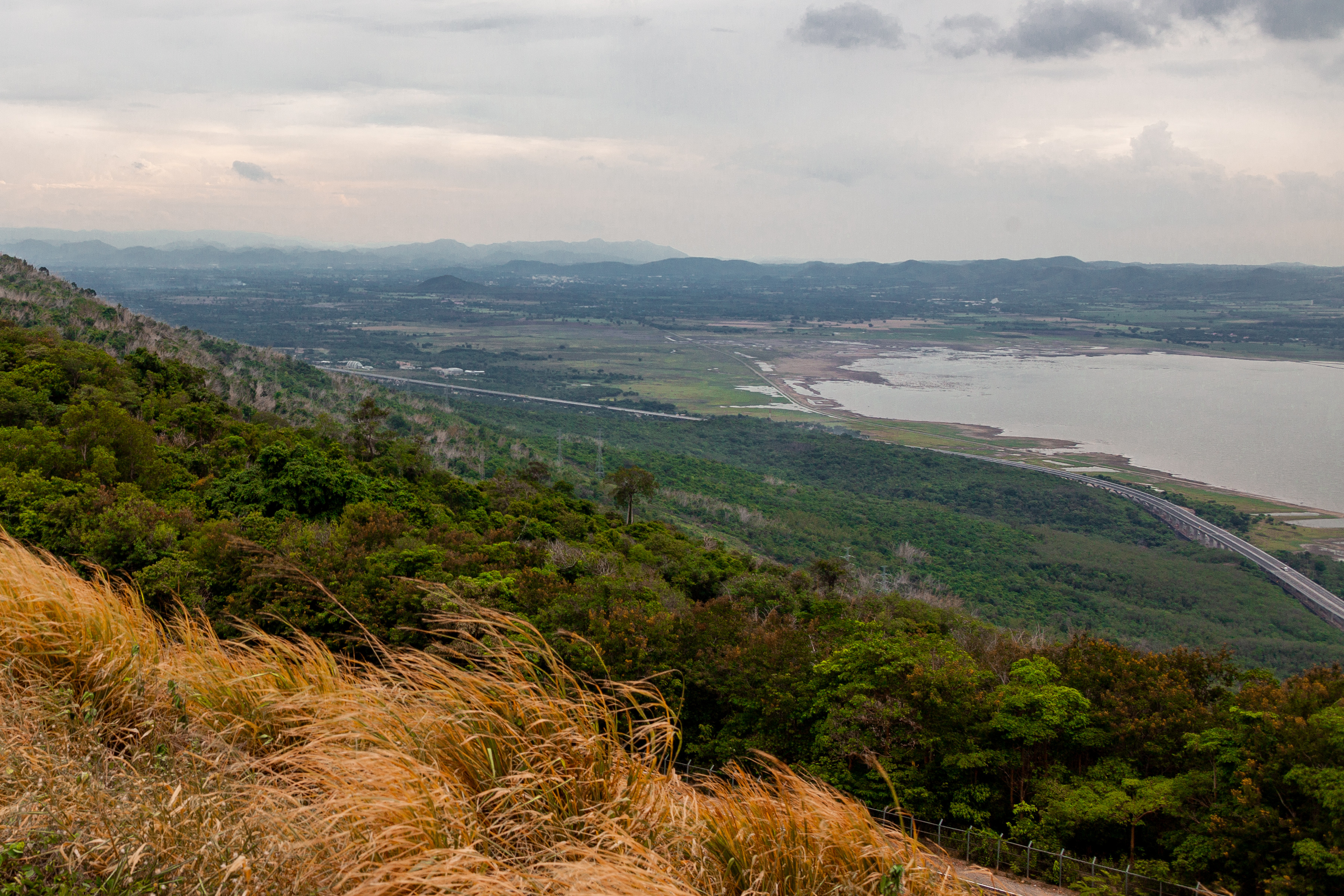
Intercity Motorway No.6 and Lam Takhong Reservoir.

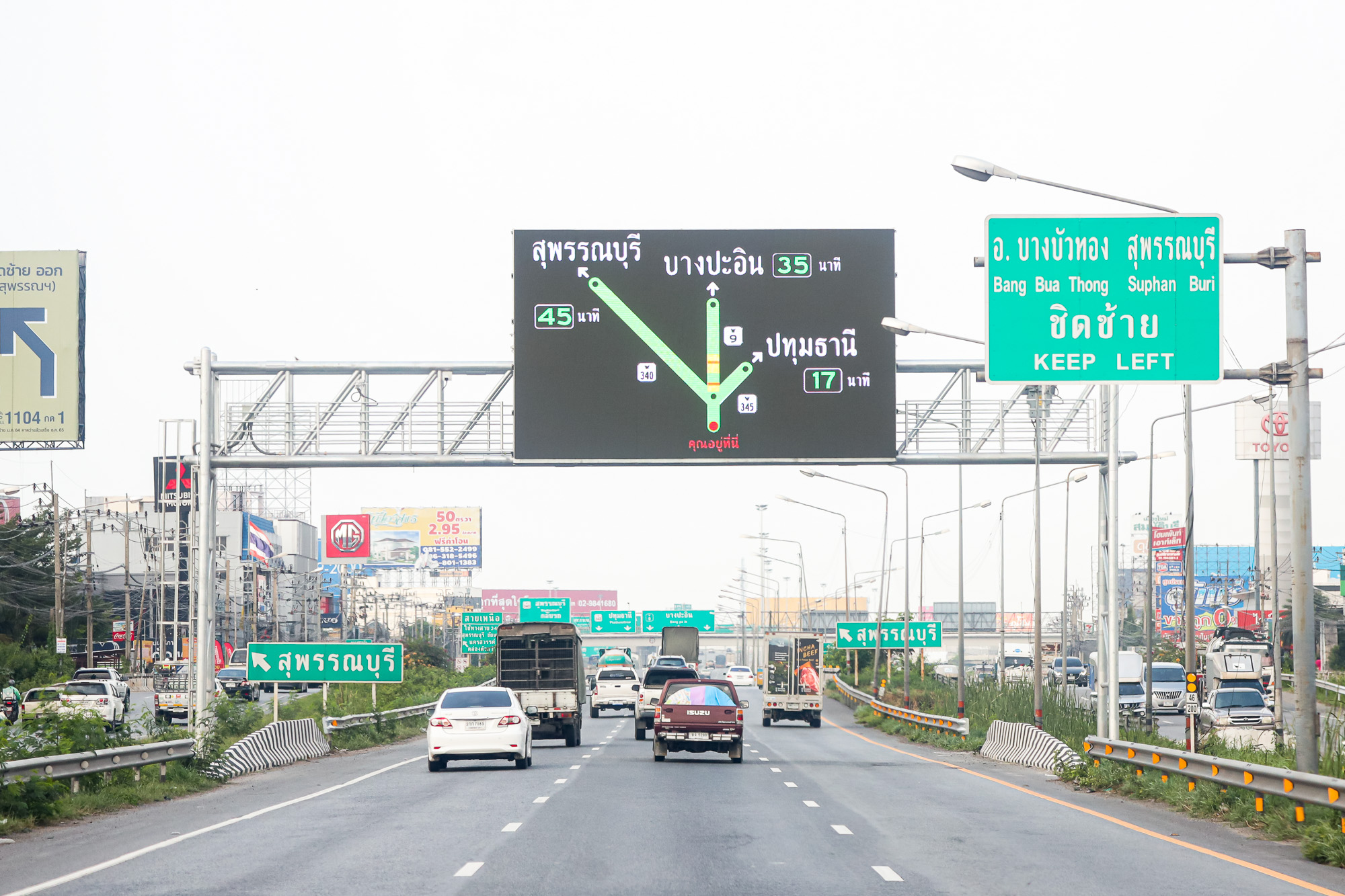
Western part of Kanchanaphisek Road does not have a toll-collection system.

== List of controlled-access highways in Thailand ==
List of controlled-access highway in Thailand
Shield	Official name	Other name(s)		From	To	Length	Opened	Owner	Operator	Status
Expressway
	Chaloem Maha Nakhon Expressway	First Stage Expressway System		Tha Ruea Interchange	Din Daeng Toll Plaza	8.9 km (5.5 mi)	29 October 1981; 44 years ago	Expressway Authority of Thailand	Expressway Authority of Thailand & Bangkok Expressway and Metro; 60:40 revenue share	Operational
	Chaloem Maha Nakhon Expressway	First Stage Expressway System		Tha Ruea Interchange	Bang Na Interchange	7.9 km (4.9 mi)	17 January 1983; 43 years ago	Expressway Authority of Thailand	Expressway Authority of Thailand & Bangkok Expressway and Metro; 60:40 revenue share	Operational
	Chaloem Maha Nakhon Expressway	First Stage Expressway System		Tha Ruea Interchange	Dao Khanong Interchange	10.3 km (6.4 mi)	5 December 1987; 38 years ago	Expressway Authority of Thailand	Expressway Authority of Thailand & Bangkok Expressway and Metro; 60:40 revenue share	Operational
	Si Rat Expressway	Second Stage Expressway System	Section A	Pracha Chuen Toll Plaza	Asok Interchange	12.4 km (7.7 mi)	2 September 1993; 32 years ago	Expressway Authority of Thailand	Expressway Authority of Thailand & Bangkok Expressway and Metro; 60:40 revenue share	Operational
	Si Rat Expressway	Second Stage Expressway System	Section B	Phaya Thai Interchange	Bang Khlo Interchange	9.4 km (5.8 mi)	6 October 1996; 29 years ago	Expressway Authority of Thailand	Expressway Authority of Thailand & Bangkok Expressway and Metro; 60:40 revenue share	Operational
	Si Rat Expressway	Second Stage Expressway System	Section C	Pracha Chuen Toll Plaza	Chaeng Watthana Interchange	8 km (5.0 mi)	2 September 1993; 32 years ago	Expressway Authority of Thailand	Bangkok Expressway and Metro	Operational
	Si Rat Expressway	Second Stage Expressway System	Section D	Asok Interchange	Srinagarindra Interchange	8.7 km (5.4 mi)	2 December 1998; 27 years ago	Expressway Authority of Thailand	Bangkok Expressway and Metro	Operational
	Si Rat Expressway	Double-Decker Expressway		Pracha Chuen Toll Plaza	Asok Interchange	17.0 km (10.6 mi)	TBA	Expressway Authority of Thailand	TBA	Under Planning
	Chalong Rat Expressway	Kanchanapisek–Ramindra–At Narong Expressway	Section 1	Watcharaphol Interchange	At Narong Interchange	18.7 km (11.6 mi)	6 October 1996; 29 years ago	Expressway Authority of Thailand	Expressway Authority of Thailand	Operational
	Chalong Rat Expressway	Kanchanapisek–Ramindra–At Narong Expressway	Section 2	Watcharaphol Interchange	Chatuchot Interchange	9.5 km (5.9 mi)	23 March 2009; 17 years ago	Expressway Authority of Thailand	Expressway Authority of Thailand	Operational
	Chalong Rat Expressway	Chatuchot-Lam Luk Ka Expressway	Section 3	Chatuchot Interchange	Lam Luk Ka Road	16.2 km (10.1 mi)	2027; 1 year's time	Expressway Authority of Thailand	Expressway Authority of Thailand	Under construction
	Burapha Withi Expressway	Bang Na –Chonburi Expressway		Bang Na Interchange	Chon Buri Toll Plaza	55 km (34 mi)	9 April 1998; 28 years ago	Expressway Authority of Thailand	Expressway Authority of Thailand	Operational
	Burapha Withi Expressway	Burapha Withi Expressway Extension		Chon Buri Toll Plaza	Nong Mai Daeng Interchange	4.5 km (2.8 mi)	TBA	Expressway Authority of Thailand	-	Under Planning
	S1 Expressway	• Third Stage Expressway System, S1 section • At Narong–Bang Na Expressway		Bang Na Interchange	At Narong Interchange	4.1 km (2.5 mi)	15 June 2005; 21 years ago	Expressway Authority of Thailand	Expressway Authority of Thailand	Operational
	Kanchanaphisek Expressway (Southern part of Kanchanaphisek Road)	• Bang Phli–Suk Sawat Expressway • South Kanchanapisek Road		Wat Salut Interchange	Bang Kru Interchange	22.1 km (13.7 mi)	15 November 2007; 18 years ago	Expressway Authority of Thailand	Expressway Authority of Thailand	Operational
	Udon Ratthaya Expressway	Bang Pa-in–Pak Kret Expressway	Phase 1	Chaeng Watthana Interchange	Chiang Rak Interchange	22.0 km (13.7 mi)	2 December 1998; 27 years ago	Expressway Authority of Thailand	Bangkok Expressway and Metro	Operational
	Udon Ratthaya Expressway	Bang Pa-in–Pak Kret Expressway	Phase 2	Chiang Rak Interchange	Kanchanaphisek Interchange (Bang Pa In Toll Plaza)	10.0 km (6.2 mi)	1 November 1999; 26 years ago	Expressway Authority of Thailand	Bangkok Expressway and Metro	Operational
	Prachim Ratthaya Expressway	Si Rat–Outer Ring Road Expressway		Si Rat Interchange	Chim Phli Toll Plaza	16.7 km (10.4 mi)	22 August 2016; 10 years ago	Expressway Authority of Thailand	Bangkok Expressway and Metro	Operational
	Don Mueang Tollway	Uttaraphimuk Elevated Tollway	Din Daeng - The National Memorial Section	Din Daeng Toll Plaza	The National Memorial Toll Plaza (abolished)	20.9 km (13.0 mi)	14 December 1994; 31 years ago	Department of Highway	Don Mueang Tollway Public Company	Operational
	Don Mueang Tollway	Uttaraphimuk Elevated Tollway	The National Memorial - Rangsit Section	The National Memorial Toll Plaza (abolished)	Rangsit Toll Plaza (abolished)	7.33 km (4.55 mi)	3 December 1998; 27 years ago	Department of Highway	Department of Highway	Toll abolished since 2004
	Rama 3 - Dao Khanong - Western Outer Ring Road			Bang Khlo Interchange	Bang Khun Thian Interchange	18.7 km (11.6 mi)	2025; 1 year ago	Expressway Authority of Thailand	Expressway Authority of Thailand	Under construction
	Si Rat - Sukhontasawat Underground Expressway			Ngam Wong Wan Interchange	Sukhontasawat Junction	10.32 km (6.41 mi)	TBA	Expressway Authority of Thailand	TBA	Under Planning
	Chalong Rat - Kanchanaphisek Road Expressway			Sukhontasawat Junction	Lat Bua Khao Interchange	6.77 km (4.21 mi)	TBA	Expressway Authority of Thailand	TBA	Under Planning
	Kathu - Patong Expressway			Phra Phuket Kaeo Road	Phra Mettha Road	3.98 km (2.47 mi)	TBA	Expressway Authority of Thailand	TBA	Project Approved
Intercity Motorway
	Intercity Motorway No.5	Northern Route Motorway	Rangsit - Bang Pa In Section	Rangsit Toll Plaza (abolished)	Bang Pa In Interchange 1	22 km (14 mi)	TBA	Department of Highway	TBA	Project Approved
	Intercity Motorway No.5	Northern Route Motorway	Bang Pa In - Nakhon Sawan Section	Bang Pa In Interchange 1	Highway No.117	175 km (109 mi)	TBA	Department of Highway	TBA	Under Planning
	Intercity Motorway No.5	Northern Route Motorway	Nakhon Sawan - Phitsanulok Section	TBA		142 km (88 mi)	TBA	Department of Highway	TBA	Under Planning
	Intercity Motorway No.5	Northern Route Motorway	Phitsanulok - Lampang Section	TBA		182 km (113 mi)	TBA	Department of Highway	TBA	Under Planning
	Intercity Motorway No.5	Northern Route Motorway	Lampang - Lamphun Section	TBA		60 km (37 mi)	TBA	Department of Highway	TBA	Under Planning
	Intercity Motorway No.5	Northern Route Motorway	Lamphun - Chiang Mai Section	TBA		39 km (24 mi)	TBA	Department of Highway	TBA	Under Planning
	Intercity Motorway No.5	Northern Route Motorway	Chiang Mai - Chiang Khong Section	TBA		292 km (181 mi)	TBA	Department of Highway	TBA	Under Planning
	Intercity Motorway No.6		Bang Pa In - Nakhon Ratchasima Section	Kanchanaphisek Road	Nakhon Ratchasima Interchange	195.8 km (121.7 mi)	December 27, 2023; 2 years ago (Pak Chong - Nakhon Ratchasima; 80 km); 2025; 1 year ago (Full route)	Department of Highway	BTS Group & Gulf Energy	Partially Operational
	Intercity Motorway No.6		Nakhon Ratchasima - Khon Khaen Section	Kham Thale So Interchange (future)	Khon Khaen Interhchange	203.33 km (126.34 mi)	TBA	Department of Highway	-	Under Planning
	Intercity Motorway No.6		Khon Khaen - Nong Khai Section	Kosum Phisai Interchange (future)	N/A	160 km (99 mi)	TBA	Department of Highway	-	Under Planning
	Intercity Motorway No.7	Bangkok - Chon Buri New Road	Section 1	Srinagarindra Interchange	Khiri Nakhon Interchange	78.8 km (49.0 mi)	December 1, 1998; 27 years ago	Department of Highway	Department of Highway	Operational
	Intercity Motorway No.7	Chon Buri - Pattaya Road	Section 2	Khiri Nakhon Interchange	Sukhumvit-Motorway Junction	47.165 km (29.307 mi)	March 28, 2010; 16 years ago	Department of Highway	Department of Highway	Operational
	Intercity Motorway No.7	Pattaya - Map Ta Put Road	Section 3	Map Prachan Interchange	U-Tapao Interchange	32 km (20 mi)	March 1, 2021; 5 years ago	Department of Highway	Department of Highway	Operational
	Intercity Motorway No.7	Srinagarindra - Suvarnabhumi Airport Elevated Road		Srinagarindra Interchange	Suvarnabhumi Airport Toll Plaza (future)	18.5 km (11.5 mi)	TBA	Department of Highway	TBA	Project Approved
	Intercity Motorway No.8	Southern Route Motorway	Nakhon Pathom - Pak Tho Section	Laem Ko Bua Interchange	Pak Tho Interchange	70.25 km (43.65 mi)	TBA	Department of Highway	TBA	Project Approved
	Intercity Motorway No.8	Southern Route Motorway	Pak Tho - Cha Am Section	Pak Tho Interchange	Tha Yang Interchange	46.19 km (28.70 mi)	TBA	Department of Highway	TBA	Project Approved
	Intercity Motorway No.8	Southern Route Motorway	Cha Am - Chumphon Section	Tha Yang Interchange	TBA	266 km (165 mi)	TBA	Department of Highway	TBA	Under Planning
	Intercity Motorway No.8	Southern Route Motorway	Chumphon - Ban Na San Section	TBA		200 km (120 mi)	TBA	Department of Highway	TBA	Under Planning
	Intercity Motorway No.8	Southern Route Motorway	Ban Na San - Phatthalung Section	TBA		168 km (104 mi)	TBA	Department of Highway	TBA	Under Planning
	Intercity Motorway No.8	Southern Route Motorway	Phatthalung - Hat Yai Section	TBA		80 km (50 mi)	TBA	Department of Highway	TBA	Under Planning
	Intercity Motorway No.8	Southern Route Motorway	Hat Yai - Su-ngai Kolok section	TBA		215 km (134 mi)	TBA	Department of Highway	TBA	Under Planning
	Intercity Motorway No.9	• Kanchanaphisek Road • Bangkok's 2nd Ring Road	Eastern Section	Bang Pa In 2 Interchange	Wat Salut Interchange	64 km (40 mi)	1998; 28 years ago	Department of Highway	Department of Highways	Operational
	Intercity Motorway No.9	• Kanchanaphisek Road • Bangkok's 2nd Ring Road	Western Section (Ground Level)	Bang Kru Interchange	Bang Pa In Interchange 1	84.127 km (52.274 mi)	1978; 48 years ago (as a part of Highway No.340) 1995; 31 years ago (renumbered to Highway No.37) 1996; 30 years ago (renumbered to Motorway No.9)	Department of Highway	Department of Highways	Operational
	Intercity Motorway No.9	• Kanchanaphisek Road • Bangkok's 2nd Ring Road	Bang Khun Thian - Bang Bua Thong Section	Bang Khun Thian Interchange	Bang Bua Thong Interchange	38 km (24 mi)	TBA	Department of Highway	TBA	Project Approved
	Intercity Motorway No.9	• Kanchanaphisek Road • Bangkok's 2nd Ring Road	Bang Bua Thong - Sam Khok Section	Bang Bua Thong Interchange	Bang Pa In Toll Plaza (future)	23.5 km (14.6 mi)	TBA	Department of Highway	TBA	Project Approved
	Intercity Motorway No.9	• Kanchanaphisek Road • Bangkok's 2nd Ring Road	Sam Khok - Bang Pa In Section	Bang Pa In Toll Plaza (future)	New Bang Pa In Interchange (future)	16.5 km (10.3 mi)	TBA	Department of Highway	TBA	Project Approved
	Intercity Motorway No.51	Udon Ratthaya - Suphan Buri Motorway		Kanchanaphisek Interchange (Bang Pa In Toll Plaza)	TBA	57 km (35 mi)	TBA	Department of Highway	TBA	Under Planning
	Intercity Motorway No.52	Lampang - Phayao Motorway		TBA		191 km (119 mi)	TBA	Department of Highway	TBA	Under Planning
	Intercity Motorway No.53	Chiang Rai - Chiang Khong Motorway		TBA		77 km (48 mi)	TBA	Department of Highway	TBA	Under Planning
	Intercity Motorway No.54	Mae Sod - Phitsanulok Motorway		TBA		205 km (127 mi)	TBA	Department of Highway	TBA	Under Planning
	Intercity Motorway No.61	Laem Chabang Port - Prachinburi Motorway	Laem Chabang Port - Highway No.331 Section	Laem Chabang Port	Highway No.331	20.942 km (13.013 mi)	TBA	Department of Highway	TBA	Under Planning
	Intercity Motorway No.61	Laem Chabang Port - Prachinburi Motorway	Highway No.331 - Prachinburi Section	Highway No.331	Highway No.3340	44.5 km (27.7 mi)	TBA	Department of Highway	TBA	Under Planning
	Intercity Motorway No.62	Nakhon Sawan - Chong Mek Border Checkpoint Motorway		TBA		594 km (369 mi)	TBA	Department of Highway	TBA	Under Planning
	Intercity Motorway No.63	Phitsanulok - Nakhon Phanom Motorway		TBA		667 km (414 mi)	TBA	Department of Highway	TBA	Under Planning
	Intercity Motorway No.64	Bueng Kan - Chong Chom Border Checkpoint/Chong Sa-ngam Border Checkpoint Motorway		TBA		481 km (299 mi)	TBA	Department of Highway	TBA	Under Planning
	Intercity Motorway No.65	Ubon Ratchathani - Na Tan Motorway		TBA		109 km (68 mi)	TBA	Department of Highway	TBA	Under Planning
	Intercity Motorway No.71	Eastern Outer Ring Road - Chachoengsao - Sa Kaeo - Aranyaprathet Border Checkpoint Motorway		Lat Bua Khao Interchange	TBA	204 km (127 mi)	TBA	Department of Highway	TBA	Under Planning
	Intercity Motorway No.72	Chonburi - Rayong - Trat Motorway		TBA		271 km (168 mi)	TBA	Department of Highway	TBA	Under Planning
	Intercity Motorway No.81	Bang Yai - Ban Pong - Kanchanaburi - Ban Phu Namron Border Checkpoint Motorway	Bang Yai - Kanchanaburi Section	Bang Yai Interchange	Kanchanaburi Interchange	96.41 km (59.91 mi)	April 19, 2024; 2 years ago (์Nakhon Pathom - Kanchanaburi; 51 km) 2025; 1 year ago (Full route)	Department of Highway	BTS Group & Gulf Energy	Operational
	Intercity Motorway No.81	Bang Yai - Ban Pong - Kanchanaburi - Ban Phu Namron Border Checkpoint Motorway	Kanchanaburi - Ban Phu Namron Border Checkpoint Section	TBA		82 km (51 mi)	TBA	Department of Highway	TBA	Project Approved
	Intercity Motorway No.82	Bang Khun Thai - Pak Tho Motorway	Bang Khun Thian - Ban Phaeo Section	Bang Khun Thian Interchange	Ban Phaeo Toll Plaza (under construction)	24.6 km (15.3 mi)	2025; 1 year ago (Partially) 2026; 0 years ago (Full route)	Department of Highway	TBA	Under construction
	Intercity Motorway No.82	Bang Khun Thai - Pak Tho Motorway	Ban Phaeo - Pak Tho Section	Ban Phaeo Toll Plaza (under construction)	Pak Tho Interchange	47 km (29 mi)	TBA	Department of Highway	TBA	Project Approved
	Intercity Motorway No.83	Chumphon - Ranong Motorway		TBA		94 km (58 mi)	TBA	Department of Highway	TBA	Under Planning
	Intercity Motorway No.84	Hat Yai - Sadao Border Checkpoint		Phetkasem Road	Sadao Border Chekcpoint	62.5 km (38.8 mi)	TBA	Department of Highway	TBA	Project Approved
	Intercity Motorway No.85	Surat Thani - Phang Nga - Phuket Motorway		TBA		236 km (147 mi)	TBA	Department of Highway	TBA	Under Planning
	Intercity Motorway No.91	Bangkok's 3rd Ring Road	Northern Section	Highway No.32	Rangsit - Nakhon Nayok Road	34 km (21 mi)	TBA	Department of Highway	TBA	Under Planning
	Intercity Motorway No.91	Bangkok's 3rd Ring Road	Eastern Section	Rangsit - Nakhon Nayok Road	Bang Na - Trat Road	97 km (60 mi)	TBA	Department of Highway	TBA	Under Planning
	Intercity Motorway No.91	Bangkok's 3rd Ring Road	Southern Section	Bang Na - Trat Road	Highway No.35	77 km (48 mi)	TBA	Department of Highway	TBA	Under Planning
	Intercity Motorway No.91	Bangkok's 3rd Ring Road	Western Section	Highway No.35	Highway No.32	101 km (63 mi)	TBA	Department of Highway	TBA	Under Planning
	Intercity Motorway No.92	Bangkok's 4th Ring Road		TBA			TBA	Department of Highway	TBA	Under Planning
Total (Operational)						634.022 km (393.963 mi)				
Total (Under construction)						220.71 km (137.14 mi)				
Total (Project approved)						430.42 km (267.45 mi)				
Total (Planned)						5,545.362 km (3,445.728 mi)				

== List of former controlled-access highways in Thailand ==
List of former controlled-access highway in Thailand
Shield	Route	Name	Former statuins	Current status	Date of status change	Notes
	Chonburi - Laem Chabang - Pattaya	Chonburi - Pattaya Road	Motorway No.7 (non-toll conllection)	Intercity Motorway No.7 (toll collection)	March 28, 2010; 16 years ago	Merged with Intercity Motorway No.7 with toll collection.
	Din Daeng - Anusorn Sathan	Vibhavadi Rangsit Road	Motorway No.31	National Highway No.31	-	-
	Dao Khanong - Wang Manao	Rama II Road	Motorway No.35	National Highway No.35	October 31, 2013; 12 years ago	The route does not meet motorway standards due to a lack of restrictions on exit and entry points.
	Lat Krabang - Rayong	-	Motorway No.36	Intercity Motorway No.7	-	Former route number of Intercity Motorway No.7 during the construction.
	Bang Phli - Bang Khun Thian	Kanchanaphisek Road (Southern Part)	Motorway No.37	Kanchanaphisek Expressway	15 November 2007; 18 years ago	Merged with Intercity Motorway No.9, the route number was later transferred to Cha-am Pranburi bypass road as National Highway No.37.
	Arun Amarin - Nakhon Chai Si	Borommaratchachonnani Road	Motorway No.338	National Highway No.338	September 20, 2013; 12 years ago	The route does not meet motorway standards due to a lack of restrictions on exit and entry points.

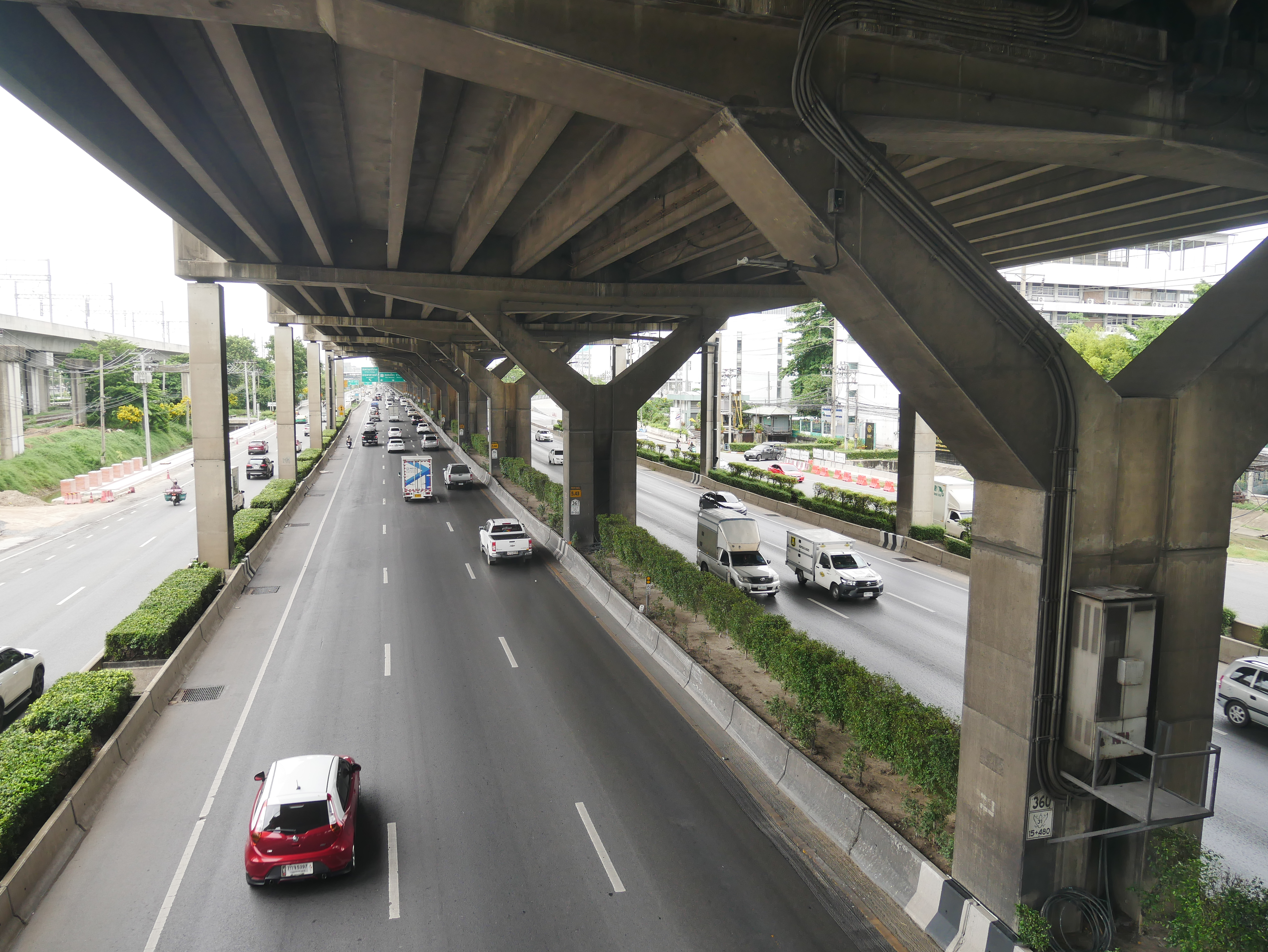
Vibhavadhi Rangsit Road with Don Mueang Tollway above.

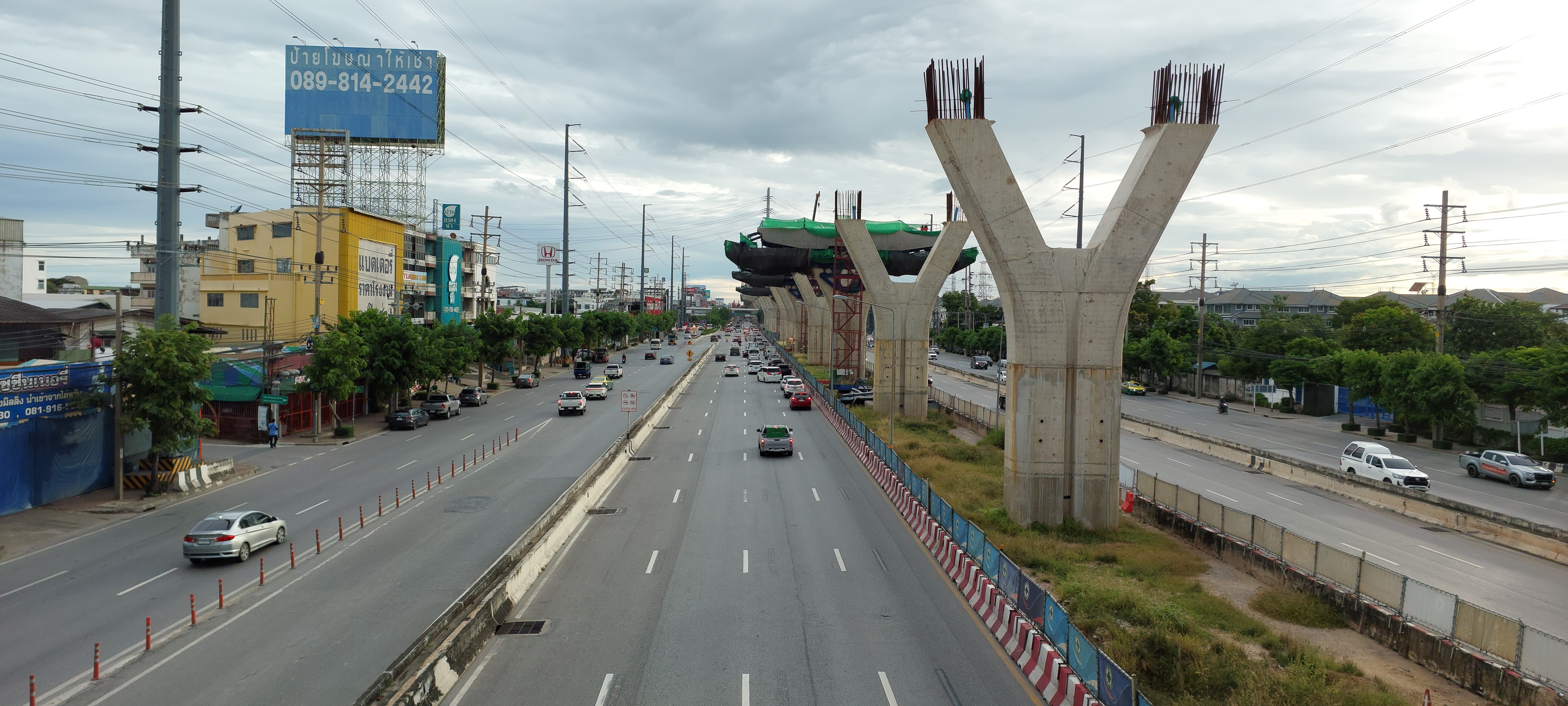
Rama II Road with Rama III-Dao Khanong-Outer Ring Road Expressway under construction.

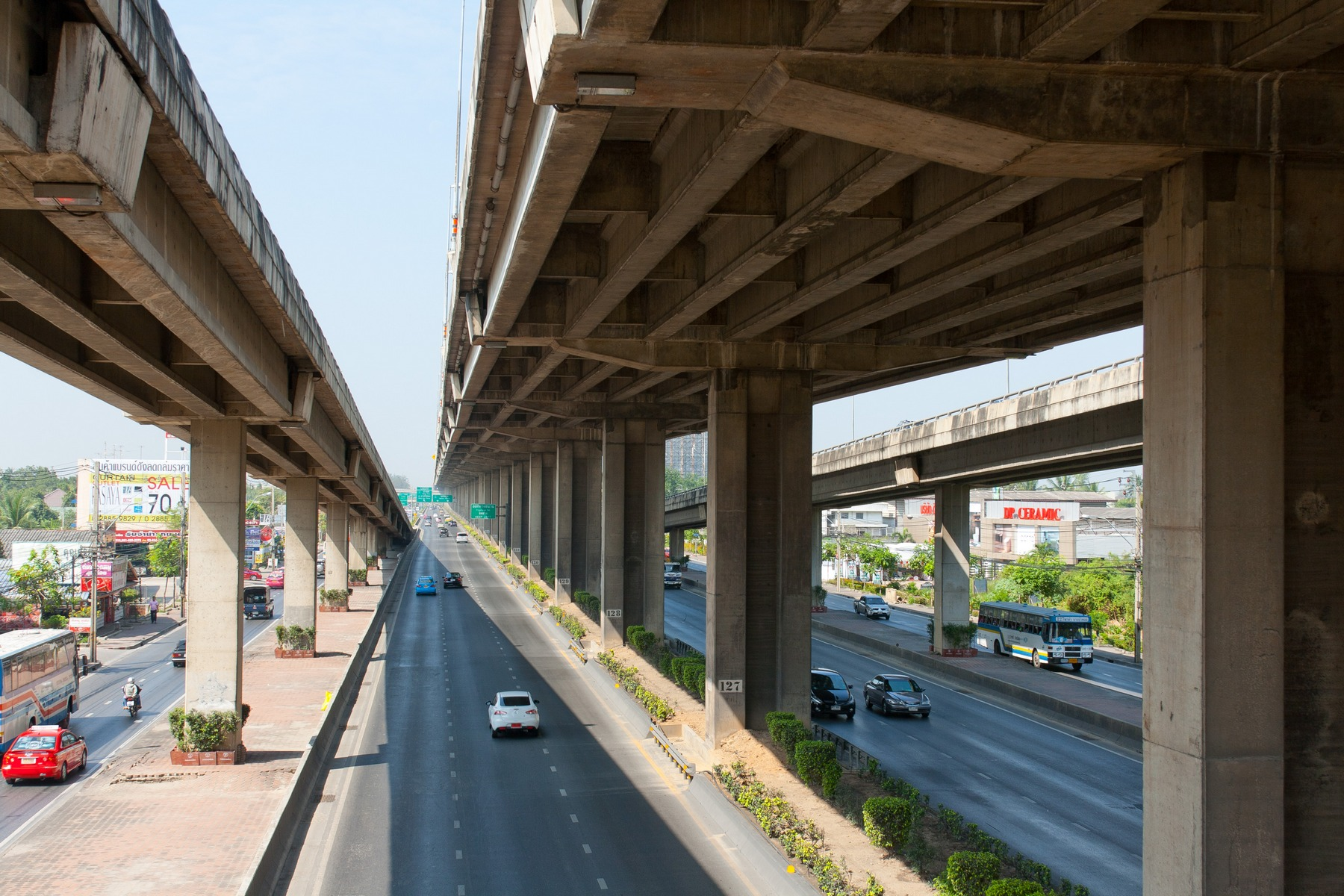
Borommaratchachonnani Road with elevated frontage road above.

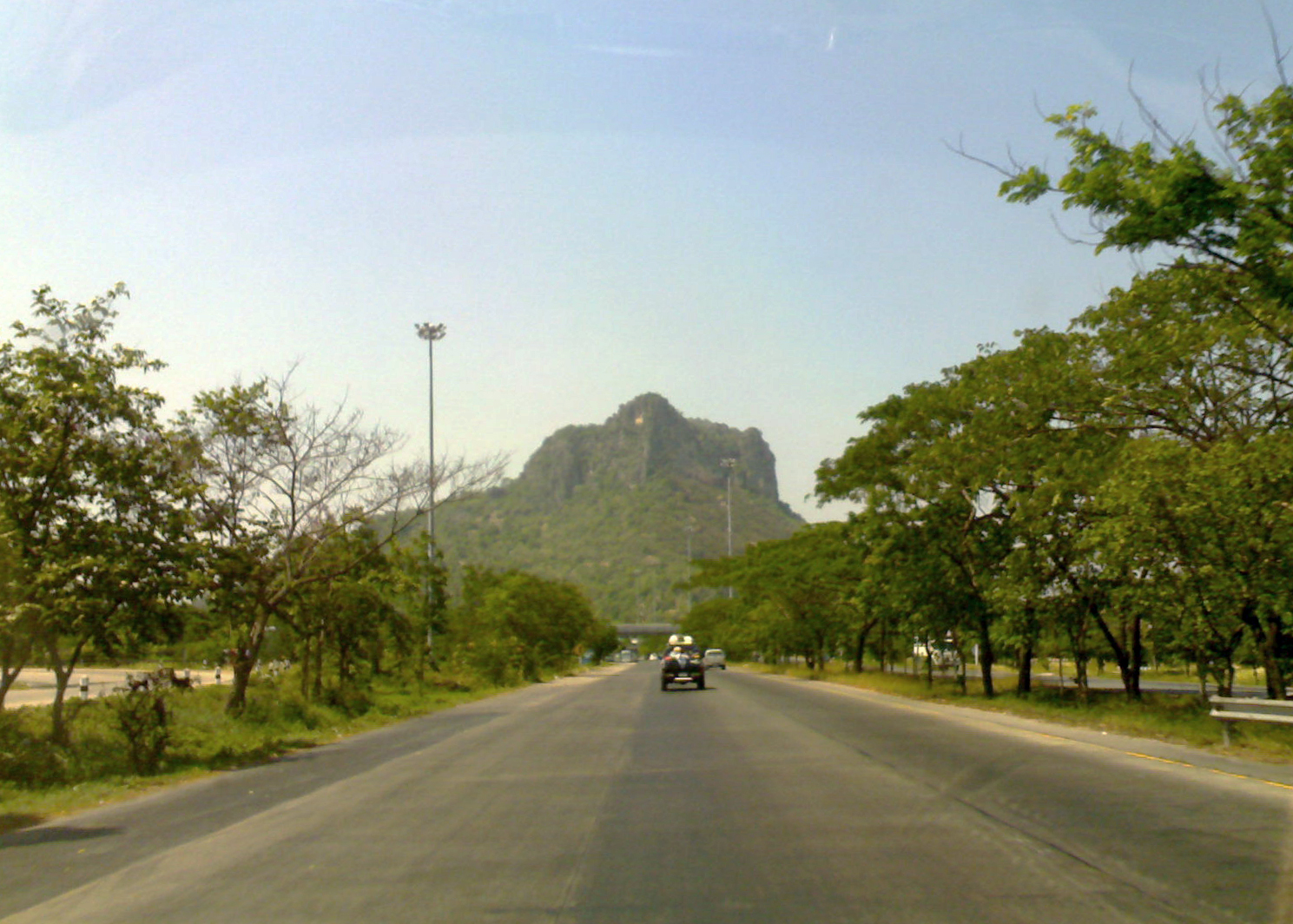
is now used for the Hua Hin - Cha-am Bypass road.
