= Kanchanaphisek Bridge =

Kanchanaphisek Bridge สะพานกาญจนาภิเษก
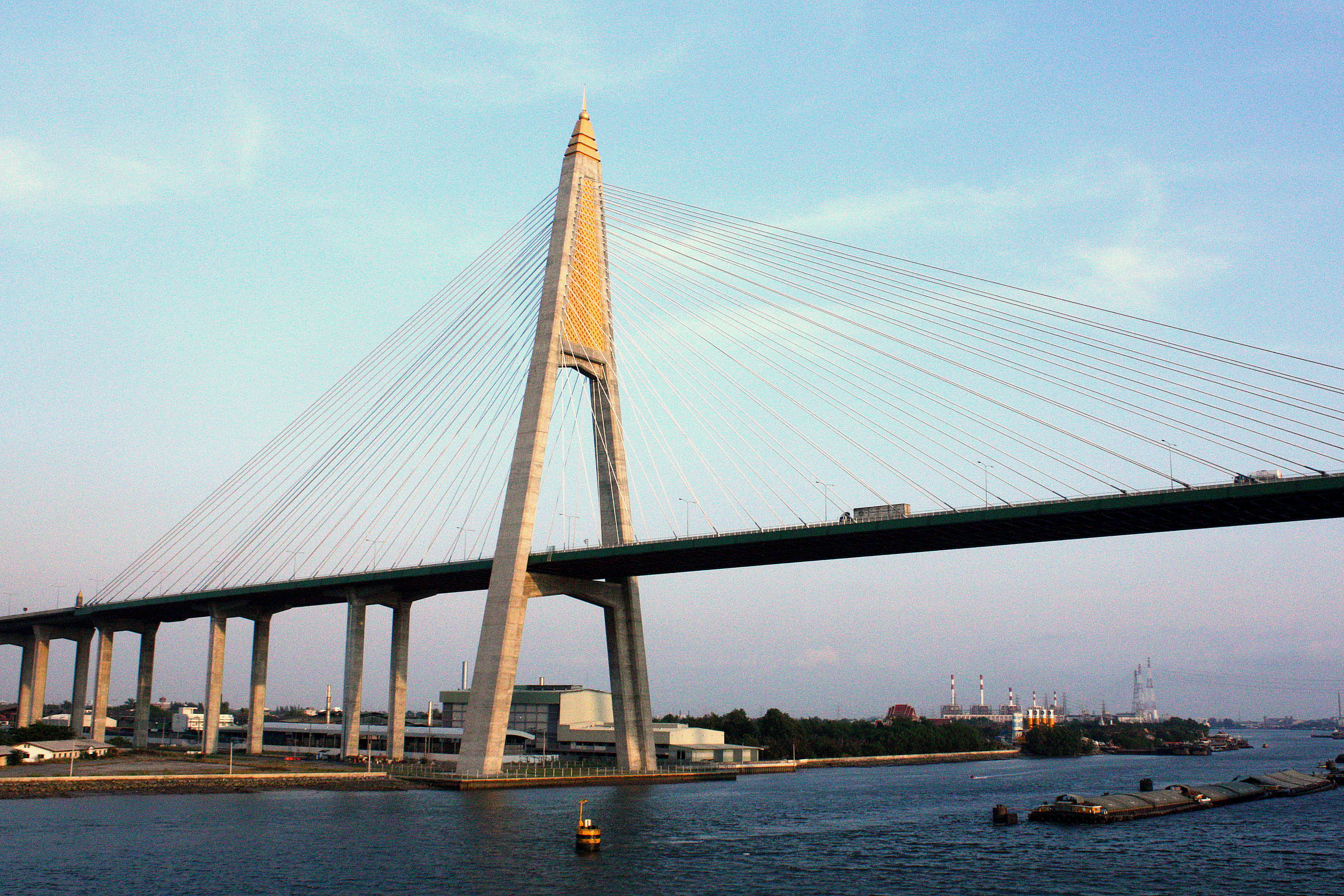
- View from the Chao Phraya River
- Coordinates: 13°38′05″N 100°32′15″E
- Carries: Kanchanaphisek Expressway
- Crosses: Chao Phraya River
- Locale: Bang Khru, Phra Pradaeng district, Samut Prakan, Thailand
- Official name: Kanchanaphisek Bridge
- Maintained by: Expressway Authority of Thailand

Characteristics
- Design: Cable-stayed bridge
- Total length: 951 m
- Width: 36.7 m
- Height: 187.6 m
- Longest span: 500 m
- Clearance below: 52.2 m

History
- Construction start: 2004
- Opened: 15 November 2007

Location
- Interactive map of Kanchanaphisek Bridge

The Kanchanaphisek Bridge (Thai: สะพานกาญจนาภิเษก) is a cable-stayed bridge crossing the Chao Phraya River in Samut Prakan Province, Thailand. It is part of the Outer Ring Road encircling Bangkok. The bridge was opened to traffic on 15 November 2007 and has a main span of 500 meters. the bridge's name was bestowed by King Bhumibol Adulyadej following the Golden Jubilee celebrations, 'Kanchanaphisek Road', meaning 'Golden Jubilee Bridge'. The bridge is 52 meters above sea level to allow cargo vessels to enter and exit. The bridge is the first bridge in Samut Prakan Province across the Chao Phraya River that connects Phra Pradaeng District on the east and west side.

The bridge was designed by Parsons Brinckerhoff. The bridge is part of the Kanchanaphisek Expressway, There is a toll for its use.

== Gallery ==
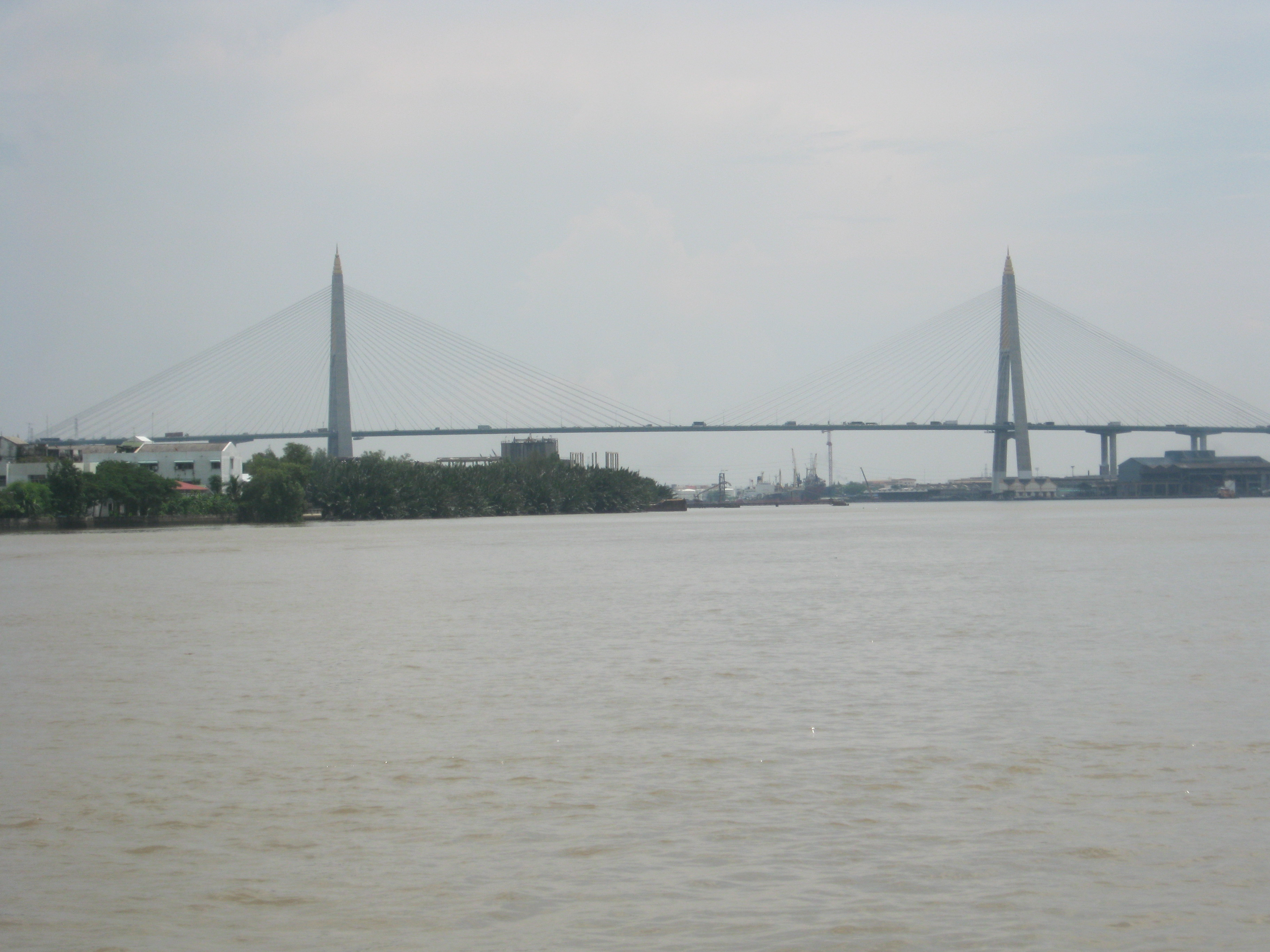
View from Chao Phra Ya River

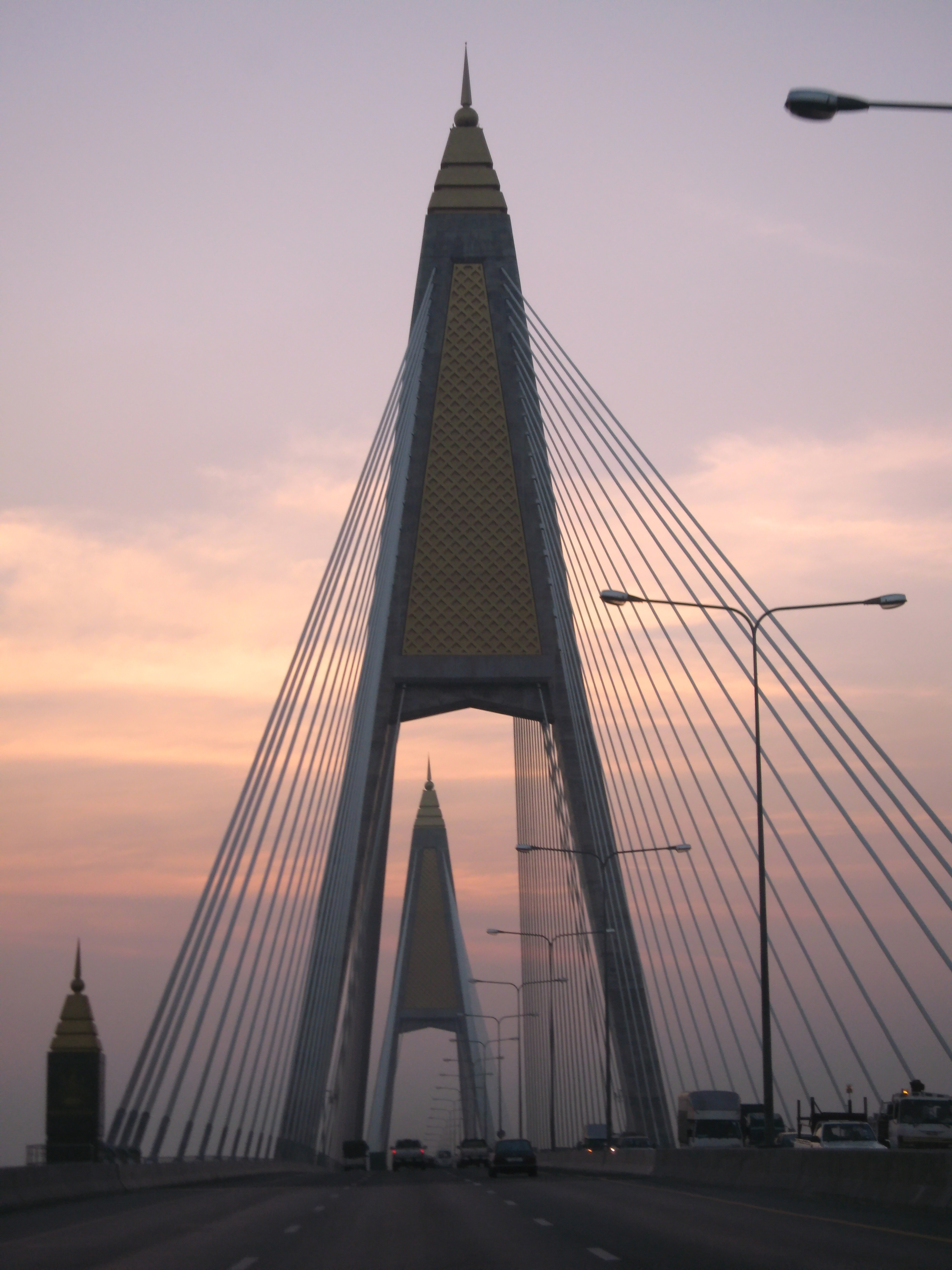
Kanchanaphisek Bridge in sunset (Up close)

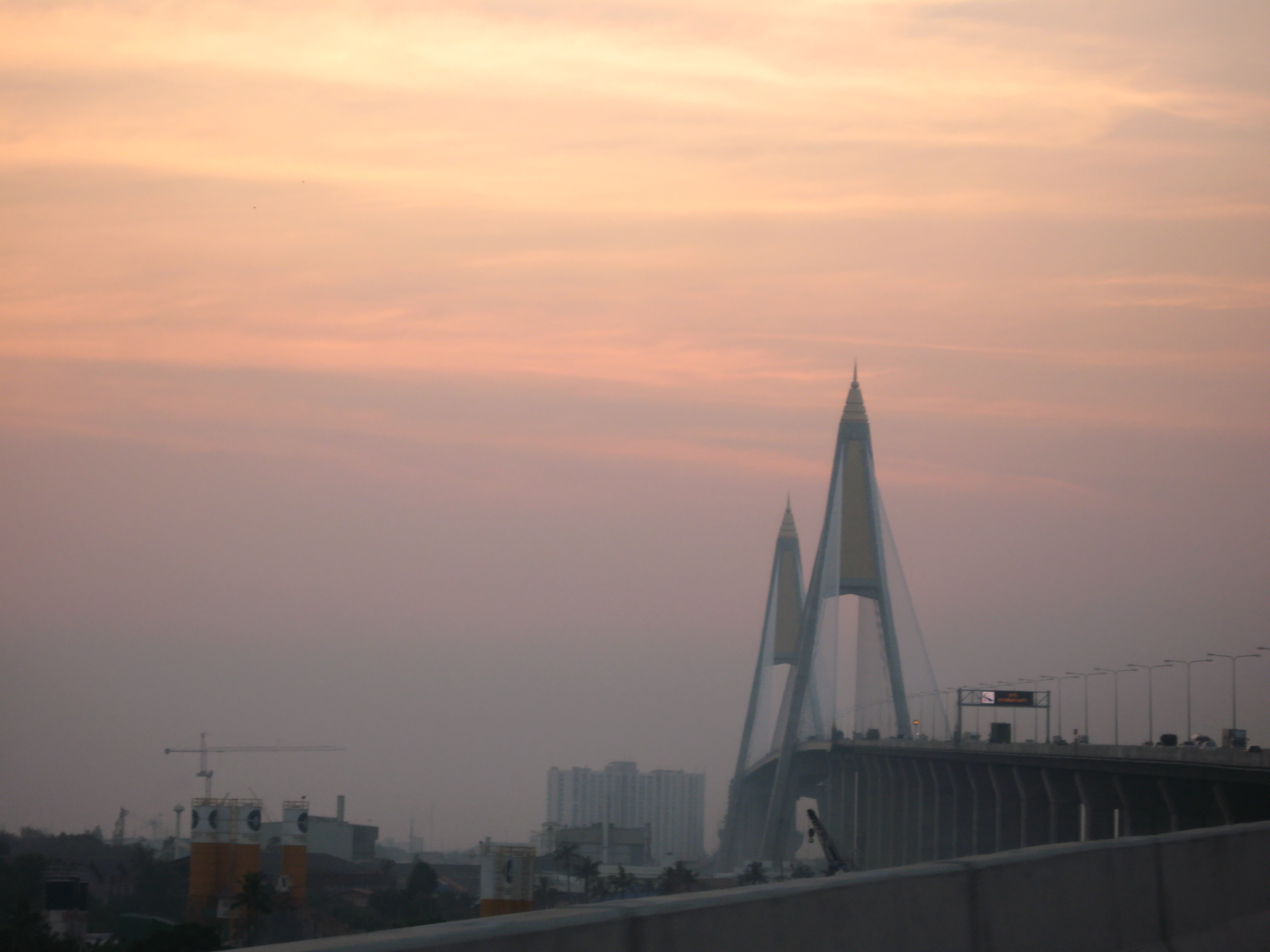
Kanchanaphisek Bridge in sunset

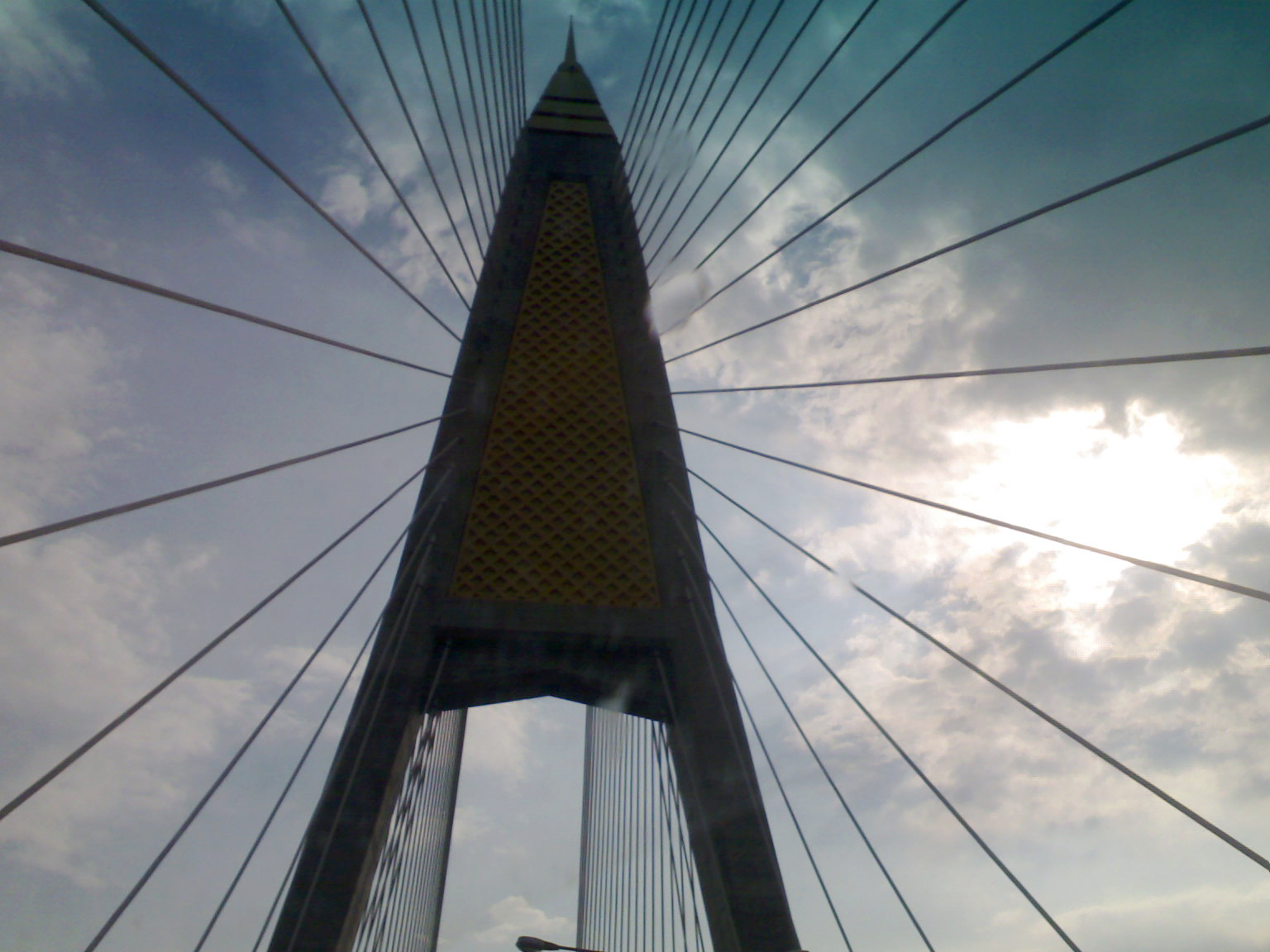
View up close

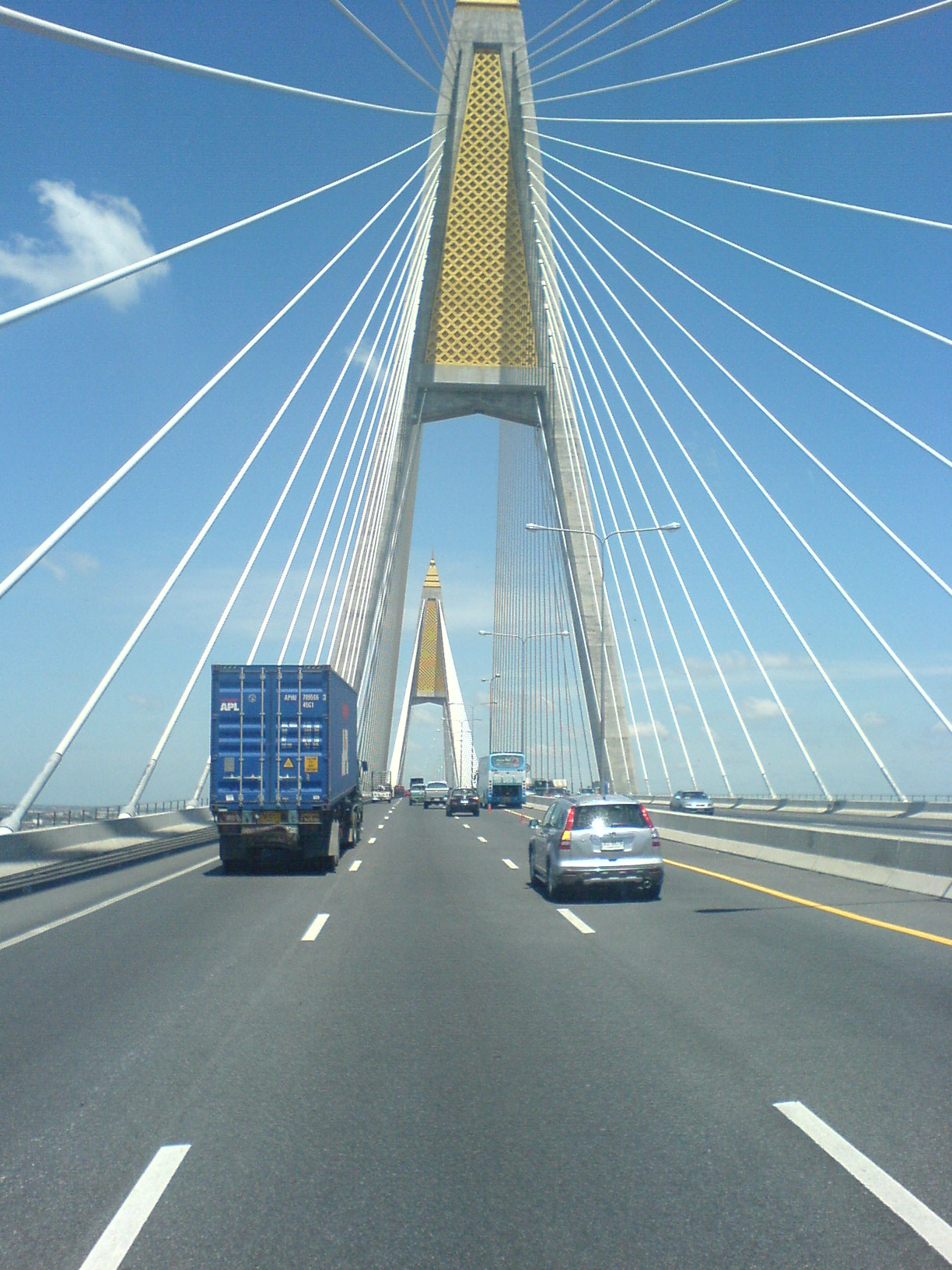
View on Kanchanaphisek Expressway
