= Kanchanaphisek Road =

Road in Thailand

Motorway Route 9
- ทางหลวงพิเศษหมายเลข 9
- ถนนกาญจนาภิเษก; Thanon Kanchanaphisek
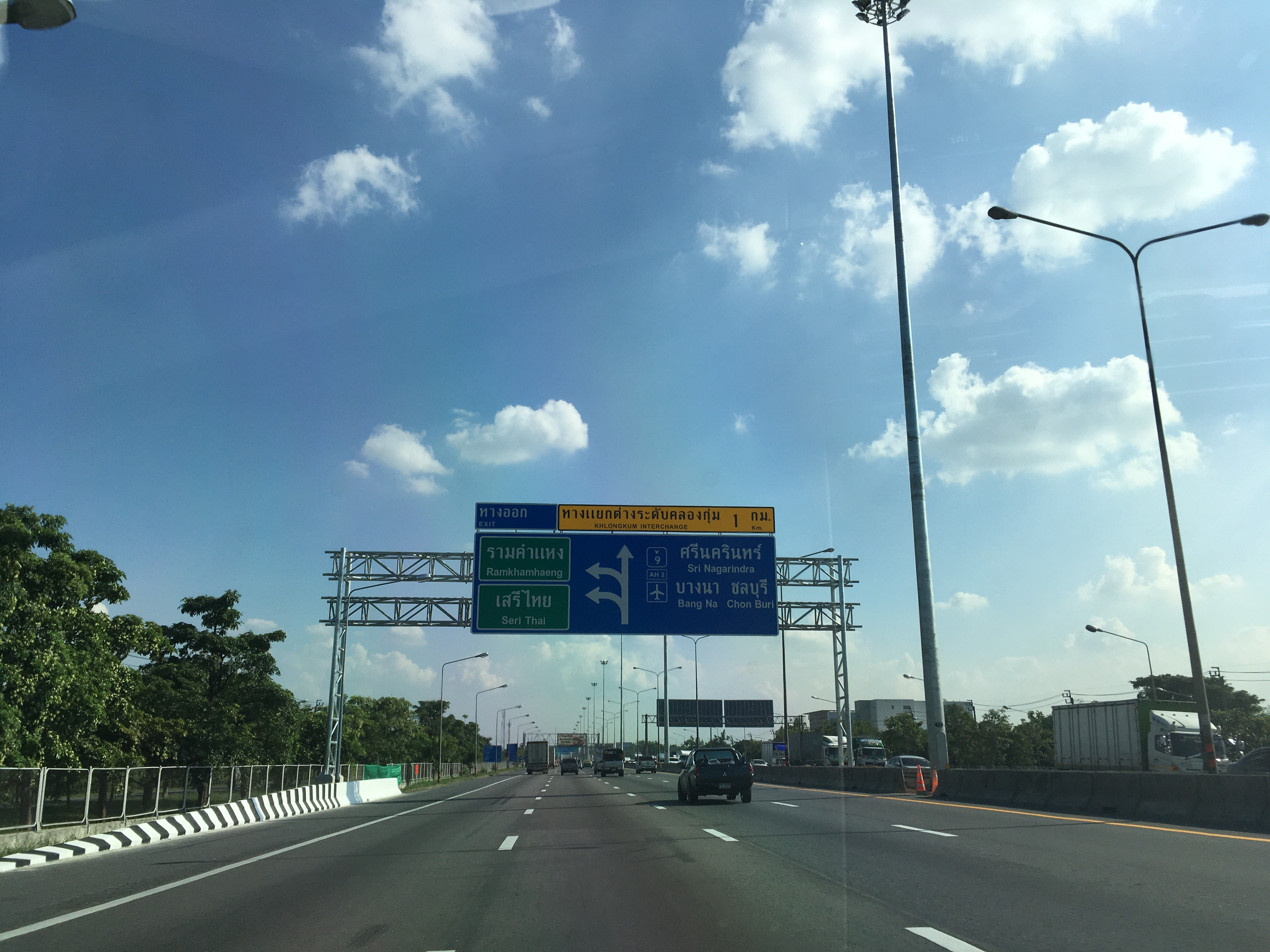

Route information
- Part of
- Maintained by Department of Highways, Expressway Authority of Thailand
- Length: 169 km (105 mi)
- Status: Opened
- Existed: 1978–present

Major junctions
- Orbital around Bangkok

East Kanchanaphisek Road
- Length: 64 km (40 mi)
- North end: Wang Noi District, Phra Nakhon Si Ayutthaya (Phahon Yothin Road)
- South end: Bang Phli District, Samut Prakan (Burapha Withi Expressway, Debaratna Road)

South Kanchanaphisek Road (Kanchanaphisek Expressway)
- Length: 36 km (22 mi)
- East end: Bang Phli District, Samut Prakan (Burapha Withi Expressway, Debaratna Road)
- West end: Bang Khun Thian District, Bangkok (Rama II Road)

West Kanchanaphisek Road
- Length: 69 km (43 mi)
- North end: Bang Pa-in District, Phra Nakhon Si Ayutthaya (Phahon Yothin Road)
- South end: Bang Khun Thian District, Bangkok (Rama II Road)

Location
- Country: Thailand
- Provinces: Bangkok, Samut Prakan, Nonthaburi, Pathum Thani, Phra Nakhon Si Ayutthaya

Highway system
- Highways in Thailand; Motorways; Asian Highways

Kanchanaphisek Road (Thai: ถนนกาญจนาภิเษก), also known as the Bangkok Outer Ring Road (Thai: ถนนวงแหวนรอบนอกกรุงเทพมหานคร) is a highway in Thailand, connecting Bangkok, Samut Prakan province, Nonthaburi province, Pathum Thani province and Phra Nakhon Si Ayutthaya province. It consists of multiple sections, including a controlled-access toll road, and almost forms a complete loop around the Bangkok Metropolitan Area.

== History ==
Kanchanaphisek Motorway, at exit 5, the exit leads to Chalong Rat Expressway.

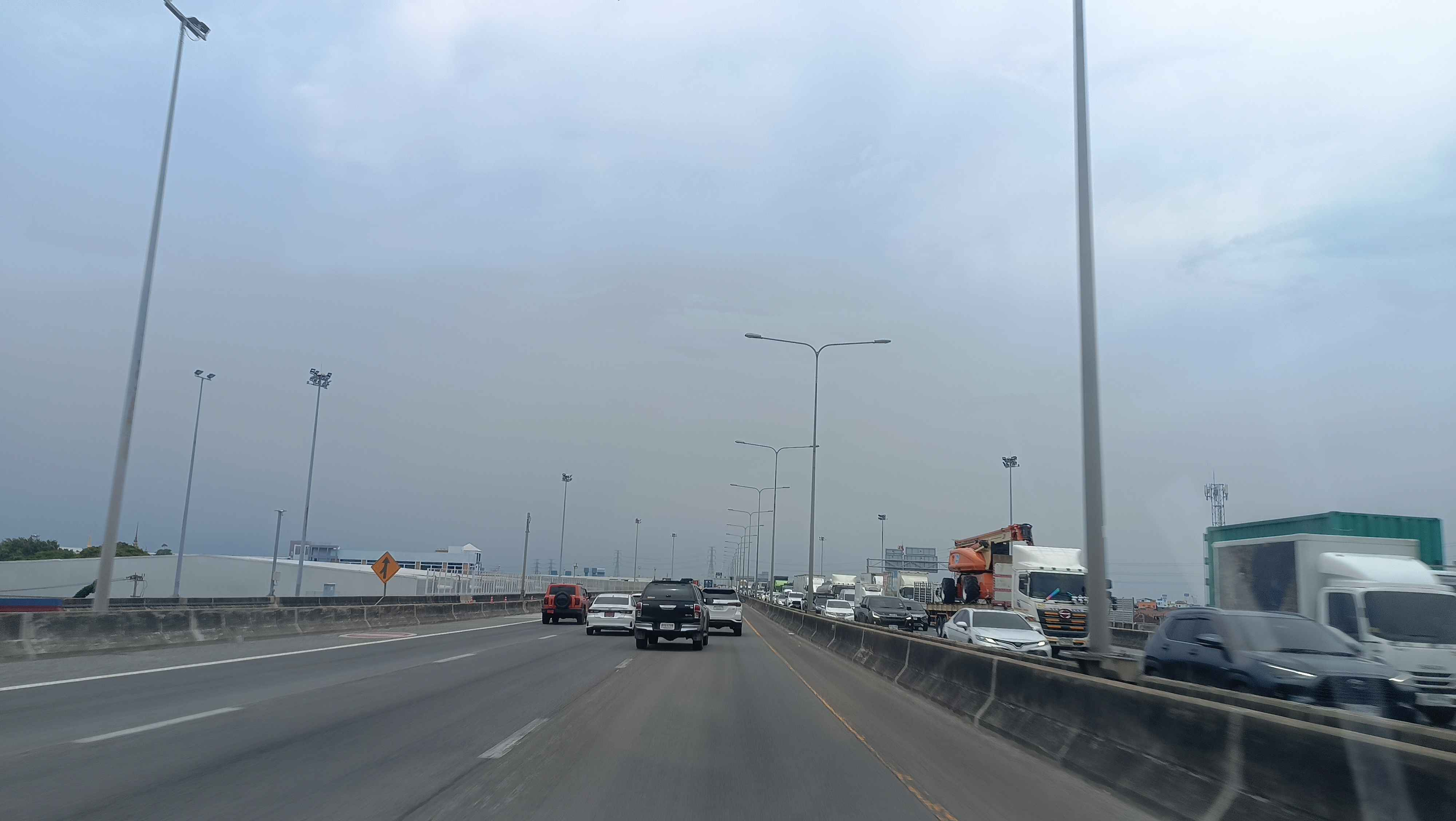

Due to the rapid economic development of Bangkok which resulted in a significant increase in road traffic, the Bangkok Outer Ring Road was conceived in 1978 as a bypass route to connect the major highways leading out of the capital city. Its construction was separated into sections due to the high costs involved in the project, with the West section being the first to be constructed, followed by the East section and the South section. The Department of Highways initially designated the highway as Highway 39, but it was changed to Highway 9 after the Master Plan of Intercity Motorways (แผนพัฒนาระบบทางหลวงพิเศษระหว่างเมือง) was drawn up in 1996. In the same year, the road's name was bestowed upon by King Bhumibol Adulyadej following the Golden Jubilee celebrations, 'Kanchanaphisek Road', meaning 'Golden Jubilee Road'.

The Department of Highways maintains West and East Kanchanaphisek Road, while the Expressway Authority of Thailand maintains the South Kanchanaphisek Road.

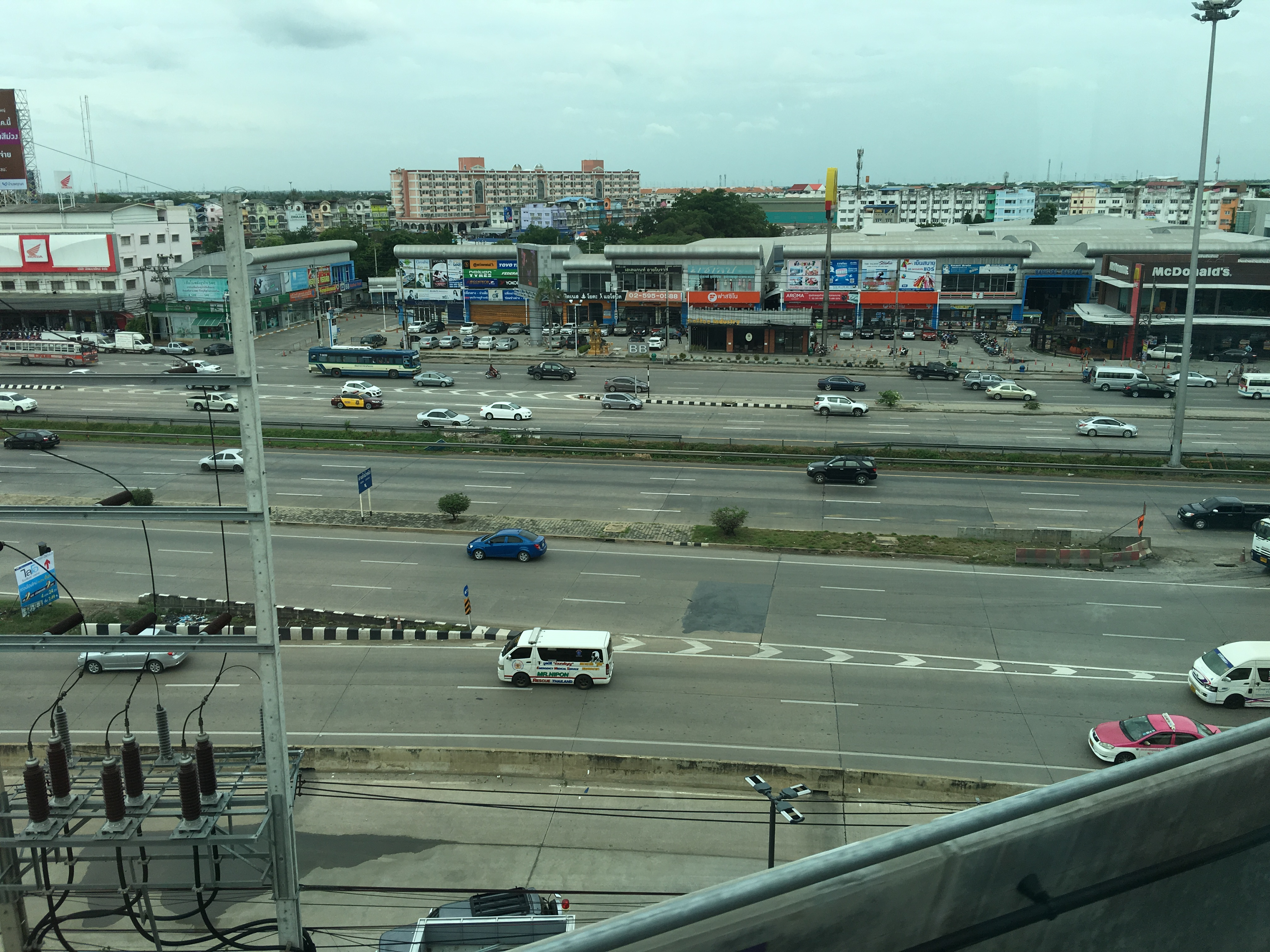
Kanchanaphisek Road in Bang Yai district, Nonthaburi

== Route ==
=== East Kanchanaphisek Road (Motorway 9) ===
Exit 9 leads to Debaratna Road and Bang Na Expressway.

The eastern section was completed in 1998 as a four-lane intercity motorway with toll collection. This was expanded to 6-8 road lanes in 2010 to handle the increased traffic after the opening of Suvarnabhumi Airport. On 15 February 2022, it was the first highway which the Department of Highways introduced the multi-lane free flow system (M-flow) to reduce congestion at the toll gates. As of April 2023, approximately 110,000 cars use the system daily.

=== West Kanchanaphisek Road ===
This was the first section to be constructed in 1978, between Taling Chan district, Bangkok and Bang Bua Thong district, Nonthaburi, as part of Highway 340 to Suphan Buri. This section was later extended to Bang Pa-in district, Phra Nakhon Si Ayutthaya in 1995. The section between Taling Chan district with Bang Khun Thian district was completed in 1998.

=== South Kanchanaphisek Road ===
The southern section was the final section to be constructed and is a controlled-access toll highway, divides into 2 parts

The Suksawat-Bang Khun Thian continues from Kanchanaphisek Expressway at Bang Khru Interchange then passes through Bang Khun Thian in Bangkok then ends at Rama II Road.

Toll collection was extended to the Suk Sawat - Bang Khun Thian section on 20 May 2019. Kanchanaphisek Bridge, the southernmost river crossing of the Chao Phraya River is part of the highway.

The Kanchanaphisek Expressway (Bang Phli - Suksawat Expressway) is located entirely in Samut Prakan province, Stretching over 21 kilometres.

The Route started in Wat Salut Interchange at kilometre 0 and passes Theparak Road, Srinagarindra Road, Sukhumvit Road the crosses the Chao Phraya River via Kanchanapisek Bridge and ends at Suksawat Road.

It opened for trial use on 15 November 2007 and toll collection between Bang Phli - Suk Sawat began on 23 March 2009.

According to an official EXAT annual report, the expressway was used by 79,603,350 cars in the 2022 fiscal year, with an average of 225,505 cars per day.

== List of Facilities ==
=== Kanchanaphisek Expressway (Bang Phli - Suksawat Expressway) ===
Kanchanaphisek Expressway
Location	km	Northbound		Facility		Southbound	
Location	km	Exit destinations (road)	Toll Plaza (Entry)	English	Thai	Toll Plaza (Entry)	Exit destinations (road)
Samut Prakan	0.00	Suvarnabhumi Airport, Chonburi ( Burapha Withi Expressway, Debaratna Road)	-	Wat Salut Interchange	ต่างระดับวัดสลุด	Bang Kaeo	-
Samut Prakan	0.00	Bang Na, At Narong ( Burapha Withi Expressway, Debaratna Road)	-	Wat Salut Interchange	ต่างระดับวัดสลุด	Bang Kaeo	-
Samut Prakan	5.29	Bang Phli ( Thepharak Road)	Thepharak	Thepharak Interchange	ต่างระดับเทพารักษ์	Thepharak	Samrong ( Thepharak Road)
Samut Prakan	10.82	Samut Prakan (Srinagarindra Road)	Bang Mueang	Bang Mueang Interchange	ต่างระดับบางเมือง	Bang Mueang	Bang Kapi (Srinagarindra Road)
Samut Prakan	14.62	Samut Prakan ( Sukhumvit Road)	Pak Nam	Sukhumvit Interchange	ต่างระดับสุขุมวิท	Pak Nam	Samrong ( Sukhumvit Road)
Samut Prakan	18.90	Pu Chao Saming Phrai Road	Pu Chao Saming Phrai	Bhumibol Bridge Interchange	ต่างระดับสะพานภูมิพล	Pu Chao Saming Phrai	-
Samut Prakan	18.90	Rama III Road (via Bhumibol Bridge)	Pu Chao Saming Phrai	Bhumibol Bridge Interchange	ต่างระดับสะพานภูมิพล	Pu Chao Saming Phrai	-
Samut Prakan	20.30	Kanchanaphisek Bridge					
Samut Prakan	21.10	Phra Pradaeng, Rat Burana ( Suk Sawat Road)	Bang Khru	Bang Khru Interchange	ต่างระดับบางครุ	Bang Khru	Phra Samut Chedi, Chulachomklao Fort ( Suk Sawat Road)
Bangkok	36.66	-	Bang Khun Thian	Bang Khun Thian Interchange	ต่างระดับบางขุนเทียน	-	Bang Pakaeo Intersection, ( Rama II Road)
Bangkok	36.66	-	Bang Khun Thian	Bang Khun Thian Interchange	ต่างระดับบางขุนเทียน	-	Samut Sakhon ( Rama II Road)

== Rapid transit ==
- Outer Ring Road - Ram Inthra MRT station of Pink Line is located near the intersection where Kanchanaphisek meets Ram Inthra Road.
- Talad Bang Yai MRT station and Khlong Bang Phai MRT station of Purple Line are located directly above the road.
- Lak Song MRT station of Blue Line is located near the intersection where Kanchanaphisek meets Phet Kasem Road.

== See also ==
- Controlled-access highways in Thailand
- Expressway Authority of Thailand
