= Thai motorway network =

System of numbered routes in Thailand

Thai Motorway Network (ทางหลวงพิเศษ)
- Thai Motorway Shield

System information
- Maintained by Department of Highways

Highway names

System links
- Highways in Thailand; Motorways; Asian Highways

The motorways (Thai: ทางหลวงพิเศษ, RTGS: thang luang phiset) in Thailand is an intercity toll controlled-access highways network that currently spans 145 kilometres (90 mi). It is to be greatly extended to 4,154.7 kilometres (2,581.6 mi) according to the master plan. Thailand's motorway network is considered to be separate from Thailand's expressway network, which is the system of expressways, usually elevated, within Greater Bangkok. Thailand also has a provincial highway network.

Motorway 7 Free Section

Motorway 7 Toll Section

Motorway 9 Toll Section

== Overview ==
The Thai highway network spans over 70,000 kilometers across all regions of Thailand. These highways, however, are often single carriageways with frequent U-turn lanes and intersections, thus slowing down traffic. Coupled with the increase in the number of vehicles and the demand for limited-access motorways, the Thai Government issued a cabinet resolution in 1997 detailing the motorway construction master plan. Some upgraded sections of highway are being turned into "motorways", while other motorways are being purpose-built.

== List of motorway routes in Thailand ==
List of motorway routes in Thailand that are operational, under construction, and planned according to the master plan in 2015.

Motorways that are operational in full or partial part.
Motorways that are under construction, wholly or in part.
Motorways that have been planned

| Route No. | Distance (KM.) | Route | Status |
|---|---|---|---|
| 5 | 7.327 (941) | Din Daeng - Rangsit – Bang Pa-in - Nakhon Sawan – Phitsanulok – Lampang – Phayao – Mae Sai (Chiang Rai) | operational (Memorial Toll Booth - Rangsit) under construction (Rangsit - Bang Pa-in) planned (Bang Pa-in - Mae Sai) |
| 6 | 196 (604) | Bang Pa-in – Saraburi – Nakhon Ratchasima – Khon Kaen – Udon Thani – Nong Khai | partially operational under construction (Bang Pa-in 1 - Bang Pa-in 2) planned (Nakhon Ratchasima – Khon Kaen – Udon Thani – Nong Khai) |
| 7 | 149 (181) | Bangkok – Chachoengsao – Chonburi – Laem Chabang port – Pattaya – Map Ta Phut (Ban Chang) | Operational (Bangkok - Map Ta Phut) under construction (Map Ta Phut - Ban Chang, Srinakarin elevated road - Suvarnabhumi Airport) |
| 8 | 10 (1068) | Nakhon Pathom – Chumphon – Phatthalung – Pattani – Su-ngai Kolok border crossing, (Narathiwat) | planned (Nakhon Chai Si - Pak Tho) |
| 9 | 181 | Bangkok 2nd Ring | operational planned (Toll-accessed of west side extension) |
| 51 | 57 | Bang Pa-in – Suphan Buri | planned |
| 52 | 191 | Lampang – Phayao | planned |
| 53 | 77 | Chiang Rai – Chiang Khong | planned |
| 54 | 205 | Mae Sot – Phitsanulok | planned |
| 61 | 315 | Laem Chabang - Nakhon Ratchasima | planned |
| 62 | 594 | Nakhon Sawan – Chong Mek border crossing (Ubon Ratchasima) | planned |
| 63 | 667 | Phitsanulok – Nakhon Phanom | planned |
| 64 | 481 | Bueng Kan – Chong Chom border crossing (Surin)/Chong Sa Ngam (Sisaket) | planned |
| 65 | 109 | Ubon Ratchathani – Na Tan (Ubon Ratchathani) | planned |
| 71 | 204 | Kanchanaphisek Road east side – Chachoengsao – Sa Kaeo – Aranyaprathet border crossing, (Sa Kaeo) | planned |
| 72 | 271 | Chonburi – Rayong – Trat | planned |
| 81 | 96 (178) | Bang Yai – Ban Pong – Kanchanaburi province – Phu Nam Ron border crossing, (Kanchanaburi) | partially operational (Bang Yai - Kanchanaburi) planned (Kanchanaburi – Phu Nam Ron border crossing) |
| 82 | 8.2(74) | Kanchanaphisek Road west side – Samut Sakhon – Samut Songkhram – Pak Tho | under construction (Ekkachai - Ban Phaeo) partially operational (Bang Khun Thian - Ekkachai) |
| 83 | 94 | Chumphon – Ranong | planned |
| 84 | 69 | Hat Yai – Sadao border crossing (Songkhla) | planned |
| 85 | 236 | Surat Thani – Phang Nga – Phuket | planned |
| 91 | 331 | Bangkok 3rd Ring | planned |
| Total | 6877 | 22 routes | |
| | 349 | 3 routes | |
| | 353 | 4 routes | |

== Former motorways ==
| Number | Route | Local name | Past status | Current status | Notes |
|---|---|---|---|---|---|
| 7 | Chonburi-Laem Chabang-Pattaya | Chonburi-Pattaya Road | Motorway 7 (free section) | Motorway 7 (tolled and controlled access) | Absorbed into Motorway 7 and tolled |
| 31 | Din Daeng - Don Mueang | Vibhavadi Rangsit Road | Motorway 31 | National Highway 31 | Downgraded to Highway 31 |
| 35 | Dao Khanong - Wang Manao | Rama II Road | Motorway 35 | National Highway 35 | Downgraded to Highway 35 on 31 October 2013 |
| 36 | Lat Krabang - Rayong | | Motorway 36 | Motorway 7 | Former designation of Motorway 7; appeared in several government documents |
| 37 | Bang Khun Thian - Phra Pradaeng | Kanchanaphisek Road (south side) | Motorway 37 | Motorway 9 | Became a portion of Motorway 9; number 37 used elsewhere |
| 338 | Arun Amarin - Nakhon Chaisri | Borommaratchachonnani Road | Motorway 338 | Highway 338 | Downgraded to Highway 338 on 20 September 2013 |

== See also ==
- Transport in Thailand
- Rail transport in Thailand
- Economy of Thailand
