= Tha Khlong =

Tha Khlong ท่าโขลง
- Town
- Tha Khlong Town Municipality เทศบาลเมืองท่าโขลง
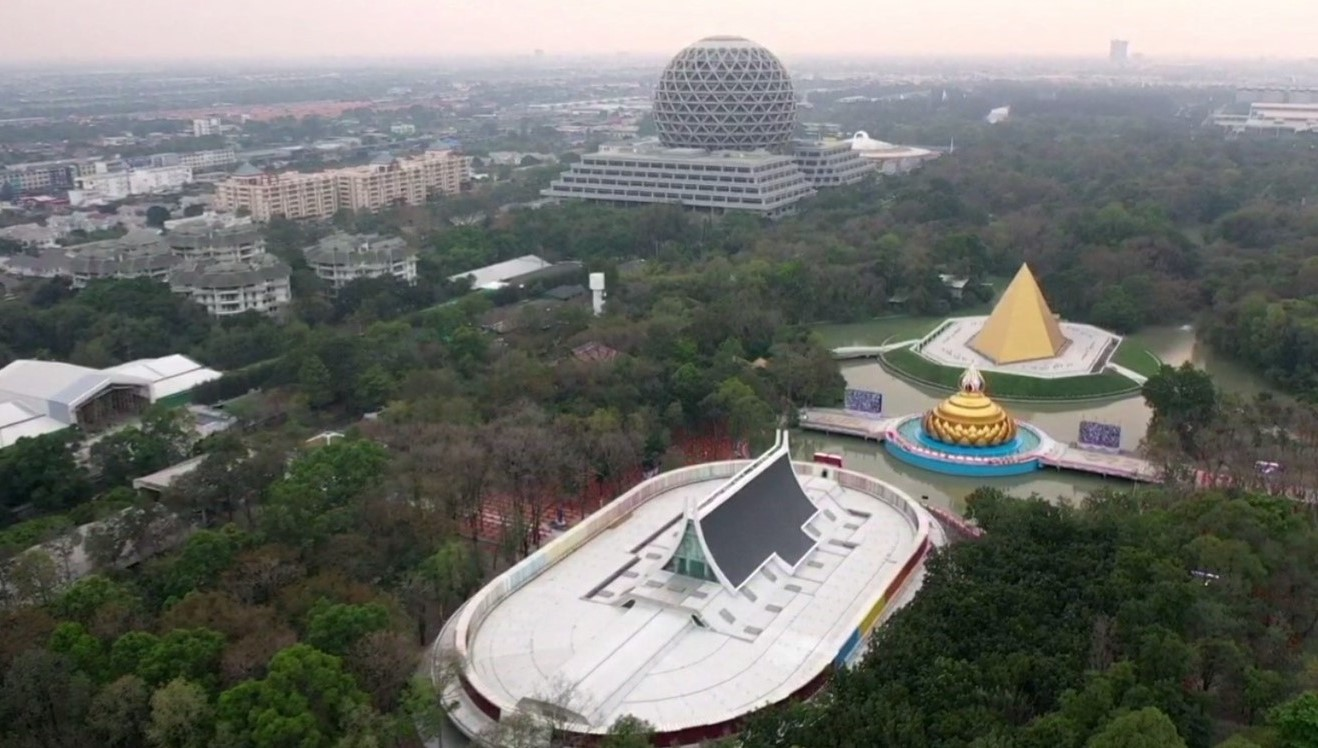
- Aerial Photo of Wat Phra Dhammakaya
- Etymology: "the pier of the herd of elephants"
- Location in Bangkok Metropolitan Region
- Coordinates: 14°05′22.0″N 100°37′25.0″E
- Country: Thailand
- Province: Pathum Thani
- District: Khlong Luang
- Named for: Thung Luang

Government
  - Type: Town Municipality
  - Mayor: Suthep Wongjaeng

Area
  - Total: 63 km^{2} (24 sq mi)

Population (2020)
  - Total: 77,243
  - Density: 1,226.08/km^{2} (3,175.5/sq mi)
- Time zone: UTC+7 (ICT)
- Postcode: 12120
- Area code: (+66) 02

Tha Khlong (Thai: ท่าโขลง, pronounced [tʰâː kʰlǒːŋ]) is a thesaban mueang (town municipality) in the Khlong Luang District of Pathum Thani Province in the Bangkok Metropolitan Region of Central Thailand.

== History ==
In the past, Tha Khlong was part of the vast field plain in central region known as "Thung Luang" (ทุ่งหลวง, "the great field") that consisted of various fields, such as Thung Rangsit (now Rangsit area), Thung Chiang Rak (now Chiang Rak area), etc.

Its name literally translates to "the pier of the herd of elephants". Because it is a place where various wildlife such as Schomburgk's deers, tigers, and wild elephants come to earn their living.

Originally, it was established as Tha Khlong Subdistrict Municipality (เทศบาลตำบลท่าโขลง) on July 21, 1996 and consists of 31 communities. Later, when there was a rapid expansion both socially and economically. As a result, it has been upgraded to Tha Khlong Town Municipality on October 10, 2001.

== Geography ==
Tha Khlong is about 5 km (3.1 mi) from the downtown Khlong Luang and about 16 km (9.9 mi) from Pathum Thani Provincial Hall, with an area of 63 sq km.

It is hemmed by other administrative areas (from the north clockwise): Chiang Rak Noi Subdistrict Municipality and Phra-In-Racha Subdistrict Municipality in Bang Pa-in District, and Phayom Subdistrict Municipality in Wang Noi District of Phra Nakhon Si Ayutthaya Province, Khlong Sam Subdistrict Municipality and Khlong Luang Town Municipality in its district, and Bang Phut Subdistrict Municipality in Mueang Pathum Thani District with Ban Pathum Subdistrict Municipality as well as Chiang Rak Noi Subdistrict Municipality in Sam Khok District in its province.

== Administration ==
The town municipality covers parts of subdistricts of Khlong Nueng and Khlong Song, only on the northern side of Khlong Luang Road (Highway 3214).

== Places ==
- Wat Phra Dhammakaya
- Thammasat University (TU) Rangsit Campus
- Asian Institute of Technology (AIT)
- Valaya Alongkorn Rajabhat University under the Royal Patronage
- Thammasat University Hospital
