= Chiang Rak Noi =

Chiang Rak Noi may refer to:

- Chiang Rak Noi, Pathum Thani, a subdistrict (tambon) of Sam Khok district, Pathum Thani province
- Chiang Rak Noi, Bang Pa-in, a subdistrict (tambon) of Bang Pa-in district, Phra Nakhon Si Ayutthaya province
  - Chiang Rak Noi railway station, serving the subdistrict
- Chiang Rak Noi, Bang Sai, a subdistrict (tambon) of Bang Sai district (1404), Phra Nakhon Si Ayutthaya province

== See also ==
- Chiang Rak, for the origin of the name
