= Udon Ratthaya Expressway =

Expressway in Thailand

Udon Ratthaya Expressway ทางพิเศษอุดรรัถยา
- Bang Pa-in–Pak Kret Expressway ทางด่วนสายบางปะอิน–ปากเกร็ด

Route information
- Maintained by Bangkok Expressway and Metro
- Length: 32.0 km (19.9 mi)
- Existed: 2 December 1998–present

Chaeng Watthana–Chiang Rak
- Length: 22.0 km (13.7 mi)
- North end: Chiang Rak Interchange
- South end: Si Rat Expressway, Chaeng Watthana Road

Chiang Rak–Bang Sai
- Length: 10.0 km (6.2 mi)
- North end: Outer Ring Road (West) (Kanchanaphisek Road)
- South end: Chiang Rak Interchange

Location
- Country: Thailand
- Provinces: Nonthaburi, Pathum Thani, Phra Nakhon Si Ayutthaya

Highway system
- Highways in Thailand; Motorways; Asian Highways

The Udon Ratthaya Expressway (Thai: ทางพิเศษอุดรรัถยา), also known as the Bang Pa-in–Pak Kret Expressway (Thai: ทางด่วนสายบางปะอิน–ปากเกร็ด), is an expressway in Thailand, located in Nonthaburi, Pathum Thani and Phra Nakhon Si Ayutthaya provinces. The expressway is a controlled-access toll road.

== History ==
Udon Ratthaya Expressway was proposed to handle road traffic for the 13th Asian Games which were held at Thammasat University Rangsit Campus in 1998. It was also aimed at reducing road traffic on Vibhavadi Rangsit and Phahon Yothin roads leading northwards out of Bangkok. The first section between Chaeng Watthana–Chiang Rak was opened on 2 December 1998. It is a continuation of the Si Rat Expressway Section C. The second section between Chiang Rak–Bang Sai was opened on 1 November 1999.

According to an official EXAT annual report, the expressway was used by 25,842,029 cars in the 2022 fiscal year, with an average of 74,688 cars per day.

== Route ==
Kilometre 0 is counted at Chaeng Watthana Interchange.

Udon Ratthaya Expressway
| Location | km | Northbound | | Facility | | Southbound | |
| Location | km | Exit destinations (road) | Toll Plaza (Entry) | English | Thai | Toll Plaza (Entry) | Exit destinations (road) |
| Nonthaburi | 0.0 | - | no toll plaza (continued from Si Rat) | Chaeng Watthana Interchange | แยกทางด่วนถนนแจ้งวัฒนะ | no toll plaza (continues to Si Rat) | Lak Si, Pak Kret ( Chaeng Watthana Road) |
| Nonthaburi | 0.0 | - | no toll plaza (continued from Si Rat) | Chaeng Watthana Interchange | แยกทางด่วนถนนแจ้งวัฒนะ | no toll plaza (continues to Si Rat) | Pracha Chuen, Bangkok ( Si Rat Expressway) |
| Nonthaburi | 2.57 | Muang Thong Thani, Sukhothai Thammathirat University (Popular Road) | Muang Thong Thani (Outbound) | Muang Thong Thani Interchange | แยกทางด่วนเมืองทองธานี | Muang Thong Thani (Inbound) | Muang Thong Thani (Popular Road) |
| Nonthaburi | 5.18 | Tiwanon Road, Nonthaburi Bridge ( Si Saman Road) | Si Saman (Outbound) | Si Saman Interchange | แยกทางด่วนศรีสมาน | Si Saman (Inbound) | Don Mueang ( Si Saman Road) |
| Pathum Thani | 12.70 | Ban Klang Intersection, Pathum Thani ( Rangsit–Pathum Thani Road) | Bang Phun (Outbound) | Bang Phun Interchange | แยกทางด่วนบางพูน | Bang Phun (Inbound) | Rangsit ( Rangsit–Pathum Thani Road) |
| Pathum Thani | 20.02 | Chiang Rak, Thammasat University Rangsit ( Chiang Rak Road) | Chiang Rak (Outbound) | Chiang Rak Interchange | แยกทางด่วนเชียงราก | Chiang Rak (Inbound) | Chiang Rak, Thammasat University Rangsit ( Chiang Rak Road) |
| Phra Nakhon Si Ayutthaya | 29.40 | Bang Sai, Bang Bua Thong ( AH2 Kanchanaphisek) | Bang Pa-in (Outbound) - exit only | Kanchanaphisek Ring Road Interchange | แยกวงแหวนกาญจนาภิเษก | Bang Pa-in (Inbound) | Bang Pa-in, Ayutthaya, Wang Noi ( AH2 |

== See also ==
- Controlled-access highways in Thailand
- Expressway Authority of Thailand
