= Si Rat Expressway =

Road in Thailand

Si Rat Expressway ทางพิเศษศรีรัช
- Second Stage Expressway System ระบบทางด่วนขั้นที่ 2

Route information
- Maintained by Bangkok Expressway and Metro
- Length: 38.4 km (23.9 mi)
- Existed: 2 September 1993–present

A (Pracha Chuen-Phra Ram 9)
- Length: 12.4 km (7.7 mi)
- North end: Prachachuen Interchange
- Major intersections: Chaloem Maha Nakhon Expressway, Prachim Ratthaya Expressway
- East end: Asok-Din Daeng Interchange

B (Phaya Thai-Bang Khlo)
- Length: 9.4 km (5.8 mi)
- North end: Phaya Thai Junction
- South end: Chaloem Maha Nakhon Expressway

C (Phra Ram 9-Srinagarindra)
- Length: 8.0 km (5.0 mi)
- East end: Asok-Din Daeng Interchange
- Major intersections: Si Rat Expressway, Chalong Rat Expressway
- West end: Motorway 7

D (Pracha Chuen-Chaeng Watthana)
- Length: 8.6 km (5.3 mi)
- North end: Udon Ratthaya Expressway, Chaeng Watthana Road
- Major intersections: Ngam Wong Wan Road
- South end: Prachachuen Interchange

Location
- Country: Thailand

Highway system
- Highways in Thailand; Motorways; Asian Highways

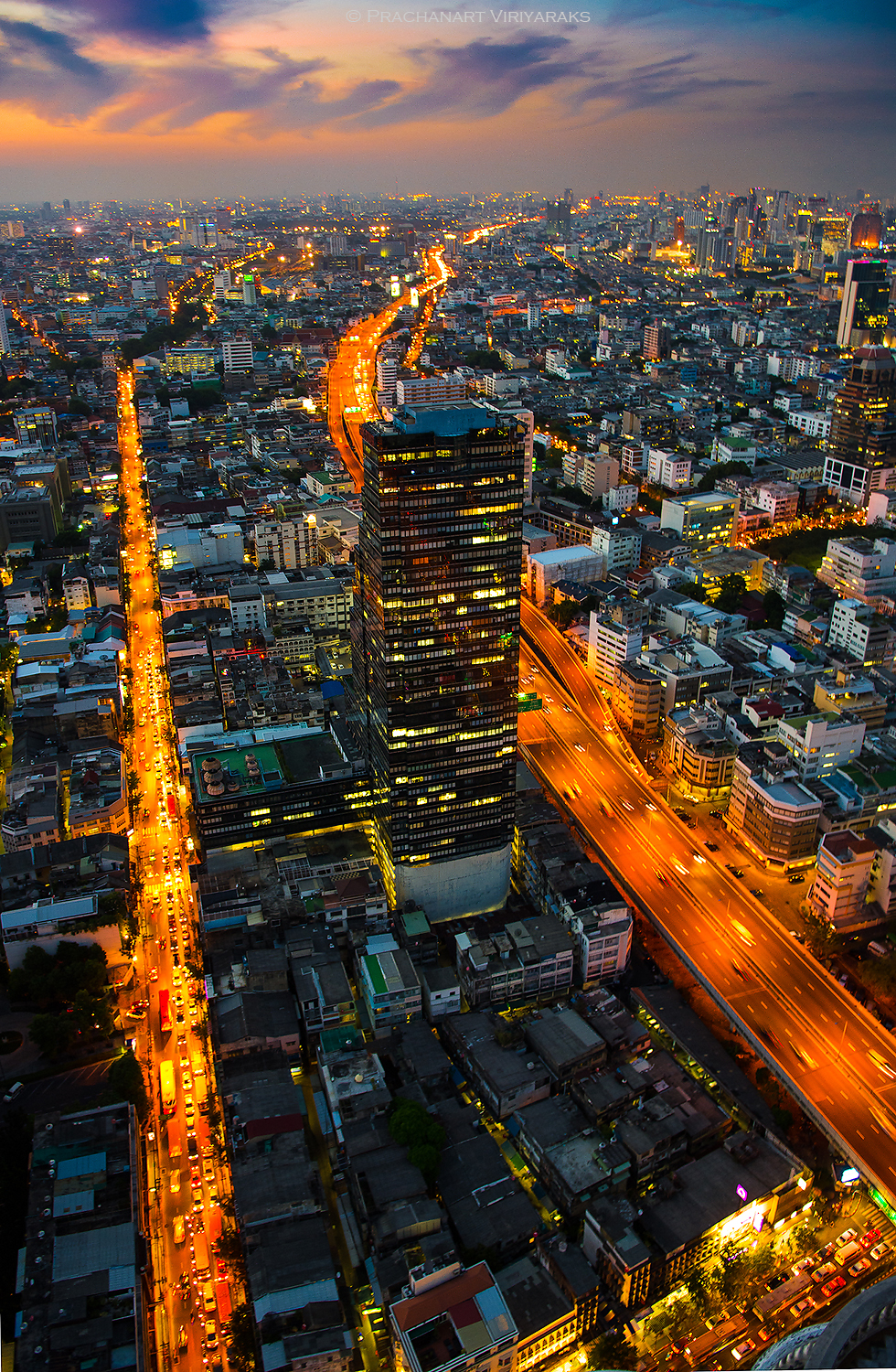
Si Rat Expressway at Si Lom Interchange

The Si Rat Expressway (Thai: ทางพิเศษศรีรัช), also known as the Second Stage Expressway System (Thai: ระบบทางด่วนขั้นที่ 2), is an controlled-access toll road in Thailand, located in Bangkok and Nonthaburi province. It is the second expressway to be opened in the country and is 38.4 kilometres (23.9 mi) in length. The expressway has played an important role in alleviating ground-level road traffic in Bangkok.

Si Rat MRT station on the Pink Line is named after the expressway.

== History ==
Due to a significant increase in road traffic in the Bangkok Metropolitan Region, and after the Chaloem Maha Nakhon Expressway was opened, a second expressway was proposed in order to alleviate the increased traffic. The Expressway Authority of Thailand (EXAT) assigned Bangkok Expressway and Metro (BEM) to construct this expressway and a contract was signed on 22 December 1988.

Expressway construction was opened in four stages, named A to D. Section A between Pracha Chuen–Phaya Thai–Phra Ram 9 was opened on 2 September 1993 along with Section C between Phra Ram 9–Srinagarindra which opened on the same day. Section B between Phaya Thai–Bang Khlo opened on 6 October 1996. Section D between Pracha Chuen–Chaeng Watthana opened on 1 April 2000.

According to an official EXAT annual report, the expressway was used by 200,645,817 cars in the 2022 fiscal year, with an average of 579,901 cars per day.

== Route ==
Si Rat Expressway; Bang Khlo – Chaeng Watthana (Sections A, B and D)
Location	km	Northbound		Facility		Southbound		Section
Location	km	Exit destinations (road)	Toll Plaza (Entry)	English	Thai	Toll Plaza (Entry)	Exit destinations (road)	Section
Bangkok	0.00	Eastbound - Bangkok Port, Din Daeng, Bang Na ( Chaloem Maha Nakhon Expressway)	Sathu Pradit 2	Bang Khlo Junction	ต่างระดับบางโคล่	-	Westbound - Dao Khanong ( Chaloem Maha Nakhon Expressway)	B
Bangkok	0.00	Eastbound - Bangkok Port, Din Daeng, Bang Na ( Chaloem Maha Nakhon Expressway)	Phra Ram 3	Bang Khlo Junction	ต่างระดับบางโคล่	-	Westbound - Dao Khanong ( Chaloem Maha Nakhon Expressway)	B
Bangkok	2.02	Trok Chan Intersection (Chan Road)	Chan	Chan Interchange	แยกทางด่วนถนนจันทน์	-	Sathu Pradit Intersection (Chan Road)	B
Bangkok	3.25	Sathon Road, Taksin Bridge (Sathon Road)	-	Sathon Interchange	แยกทางด่วนถนนสาทร	Sathon	-	B
Bangkok	3.70	-	-	Si Lom Interchange	แยกทางด่วนถนนสีลม	-	Surasak Intersection (Si Lom Road)	B
Bangkok	4.00	-	Surawong	Surawong Interchange	แยกทางด่วนถนนสุรวงศ์	-	-	B
Bangkok	5.30	Hua Lamphong (Rama IV Road)	Hua Lamphong	Mahanakhon Interchange	แยกทางด่วนมหานคร	Saphan Sawang	Sam Yan (Rama IV Road)	B
Bangkok	7.10	Urupong, Yommarat, Lan Luang Road, Phitsanulok Road (Phetchaburi Road)	Yommarat	Urupong Interchange	แยกทางด่วนอุรุพงษ์	Urupong	Ratchathewi (Phetchaburi Road)	B
Bangkok	9.50	Eastbound - Phra Ram 9, Srinagarindra Road ( Si Rat Expressway)	-	Phaya Thai Junction	ต่างระดับพญาไท	-	-	A, B
Bangkok	10.50	Khlong Prapa, Pradiphat (Rama VI Road)	Khlong Prapa 1	Khlong Prapa Interchange	แยกทางด่วนคลองประปา	Khlong Prapa 2	Sam Sen, Ministry of Finance (Rama VI Road)	A
Bangkok	12.50	Chatuchak Park, Chatuchak Market, Bang Sue ( Kamphaeng Phet Road)	-	Kamphaeng Phet Interchange	แยกทางด่วนถนนกำแพงเพชร	Yan Phahon Yothin	-	A
Bangkok	13.90	Chatuchak Park, Bangkok Bus Terminal, Krung Thep Aphiwat Central Terminal (Kamphaeng Phet 2 Road)	-	Kamphaeng Phet 2 Interchange	แยกทางด่วนถนนกำแพงเพชร 2	Bang Sue	Chatuchak Park, Bangkok Bus Terminal, Krung Thep Aphiwat Central Terminal (Kamphaeng Phet 2 Road)	A
Bangkok	15.40	-	Bang Sue 1 (to Prachim Ratthaya)	Si Rat Junction	ต่างระดับศรีรัช	Bang Sue 2 (from Prachim Ratthaya)	Westbound - Taling Chan, Outer Ring Road (West) ( Prachim Ratthaya Expressway)	A
Bangkok	16.80	Prachanukun Intersection, Wong Sawang (Ratchadaphisek Road)	-	Ratchadaphisek Interchange	แยกทางด่วนถนนรัชดาภิเษก	Ratchadaphisek	Vibhavadi Rangsit Road (Ratchadaphisek Road) - exit at Prachachuen Interchange	A
Bangkok	18.10	-	Pracha Chuen (Outbound)	Pracha Chuen Interchange	แยกทางด่วนประชาชื่น	Pracha Chuen (Inbound)	Pracha Chuen (Pracha Chuen Road)	A, D
Bangkok	18.10	Pracha Chuen 2 Toll Plaza			Pracha Chuen 1 Toll Plaza			A, D
Nonthaburi	20.12	Nonthaburi, Khae Rai ( Ngam Wong Wan Road)	Ngam Wong Wan 1	Ngam Wong Wan Interchange	แยกทางด่วนถนนงามวงศ์งาน	Ngam Wong Wan 2	Bang Khen, Kasetsart University ( Ngam Wong Wan Road)	D
Nonthaburi	24.25	Lak Si, Pak Kret ( Chaeng Watthana Road)	-	Chaeng Watthana Interchange	แยกทางด่วนถนนแจ้งวัฒนะ	Chaeng Watthana	-	D
Nonthaburi	24.25	Chiang Rak, Bang Pa-in ( Udon Ratthaya Expressway)	-	Chaeng Watthana Interchange	แยกทางด่วนถนนแจ้งวัฒนะ	Chaeng Watthana	-	D
Phaya Thai – Srinagarindra (Sections A and C)								
Location	km	Eastbound		Facility		Westbound		
Location	km	Exit destinations (road)	Toll Plaza (Entry)	English	Thai	Toll Plaza (Entry)	Exit destinations (road)	
Bangkok	0.00	Northbound - Ratchadaphisek, Chaeng Watthana ( Si Rat Expressway)	-	Phaya Thai Junction	ต่างระดับพญาไท	-	Southbound - Silom, Bang Khlo ( Si Rat Expressway)	A, B
Bangkok	1.27	Sanam Pao (Phahon Yothin Road)	Phahon Yothin 1	Victory Monument Interchange	แยกทางด่วนอนุสาวรีย์ชัยสมรภูมิ	Phahon Yothin 2	Victory Monument (Phahon Yothin Road)	A
Bangkok	2.27	Northbound - Din Daeng ( Chaloem Maha Nakhon Expressway)	-	Makkasan Junction	ต่างระดับมักกะสัน	-	Southbound - Dao Khanong, Bang Na ( Chaloem Maha Nakhon Expressway)	A
Bangkok	4.45	Phra Ram 9 Intersection (Ratchadaphisek Road)	-	Asok-Din Daeng Interchange	แยกทางด่วนถนนอโศก-ดินแดง	Asok 2	-	A, C
Bangkok	4.70	Asok 3 Toll Plaza			Asok 4 Toll Plaza			A, C
Bangkok	5.00	Rama IX Road (Phet Uthai Road)	Asok 3-1	Phet Uthai Interchange	แยกทางด่วนถนนเพชรอุทัย	Asok 1	-	C
Bangkok	6.80		Phra Ram 9	Phra Ram 9 Interchange	แยกทางด่วนถนนพระราม 9	-	Rama IX Road (Rama IX Road)	C
Bangkok	7.75	Northbound - Lat Phrao, Ram Inthra ( Chalong Rat Expressway)	Phra Ram 9-1 (to Chalong Rat)	Ramkhamhaeng Junction	ต่างระดับรามคำแหง	Phra Ram 9-1 (from Chalong Rat)	Southbound - Phatthanakan, At Narong ( Chalong Rat Expressway)	C
Bangkok	7.75	Northbound - Lat Phrao, Ram Inthra ( Chalong Rat Expressway)	Phra Ram 9-1 (to Chalong Rat)	Ramkhamhaeng Junction	ต่างระดับรามคำแหง	Ramkhamhaeng	Southbound - Phatthanakan, At Narong ( Chalong Rat Expressway)	C
Bangkok	13.03	Bang Kapi, Bang Na (Srinagarindra Road)	-	Srinagarindra Junction	ต่างระดับศรีนครินทร์	Srinagarindra	-	C
Bangkok	13.03	Lat Krabang, Suvarnabhumi Airport, Chonburi (Motorway 7)	-	Srinagarindra Junction	ต่างระดับศรีนครินทร์	Srinagarindra	-	C

== See also ==
- Controlled-access highways in Thailand
- Expressway Authority of Thailand
