= Bang Pa-in railway station =

Railway station in Thailand

Bang Pa-in บางปะอิน
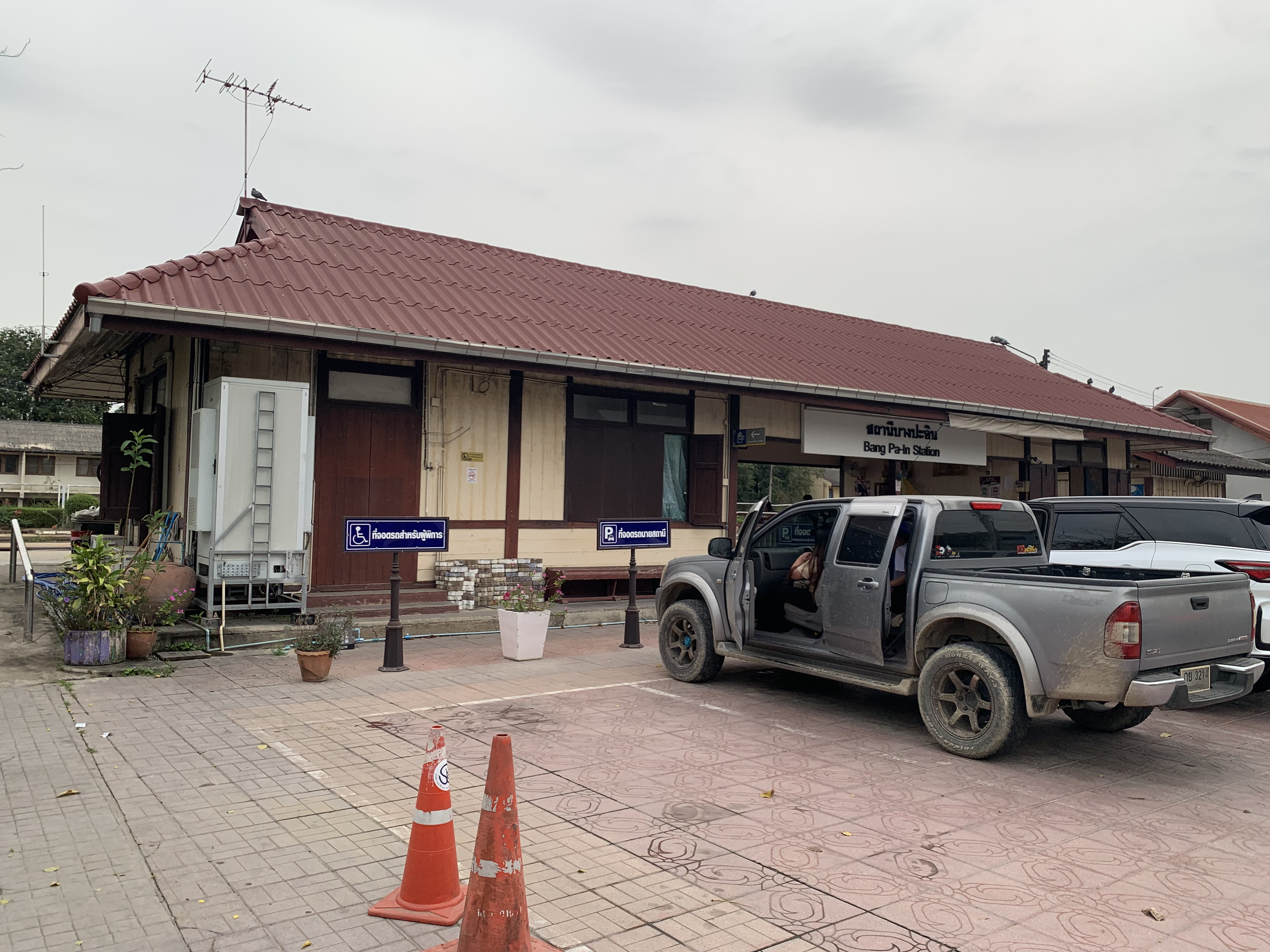
- Bang Pa-In Railway Station building on approach

General information
- Location: National Highway No. 3477, Ban Len Subdistrict, Bang Pa-in District, Phra Nakhon Si Ayutthaya
- Coordinates: 14.2394°N 100.5844°E
- Owner: State Railway of Thailand
- Lines: Northern Line; Northeastern Line
- Platforms: 4
- Tracks: 4

Other information
- Station code: บอ.

Services
| Preceding station | State Railway of Thailand | Following station |
|---|---|---|
| Khlong Phutsa towards Hua Lamphong or Krung Thep Aphiwat | Northern Line | Ban Pho towards Chiang Mai |
| Khlong Phutsa towards Hua Lamphong or Krung Thep Aphiwat | Northeastern Line | Ban Pho towards Ubon Ratchathani or Khamsavath (Laos) |
Location

Bang Pa-in station (Thai: สถานีบางปะอิน) is a railway station located in Ban Len Subdistrict, Bang Pa-in District, Phra Nakhon Si Ayutthaya. It is a class 1 railway station located 58.001 km (36.0 mi) from Bangkok Railway Station. To the north of the station building located the royal pavilion (royal waiting room; Thai: พลับพลาที่ประทับ) built by King Chulalongkorn for use during his and the Royal Family visits to the Bang Pa-In Royal Palace.

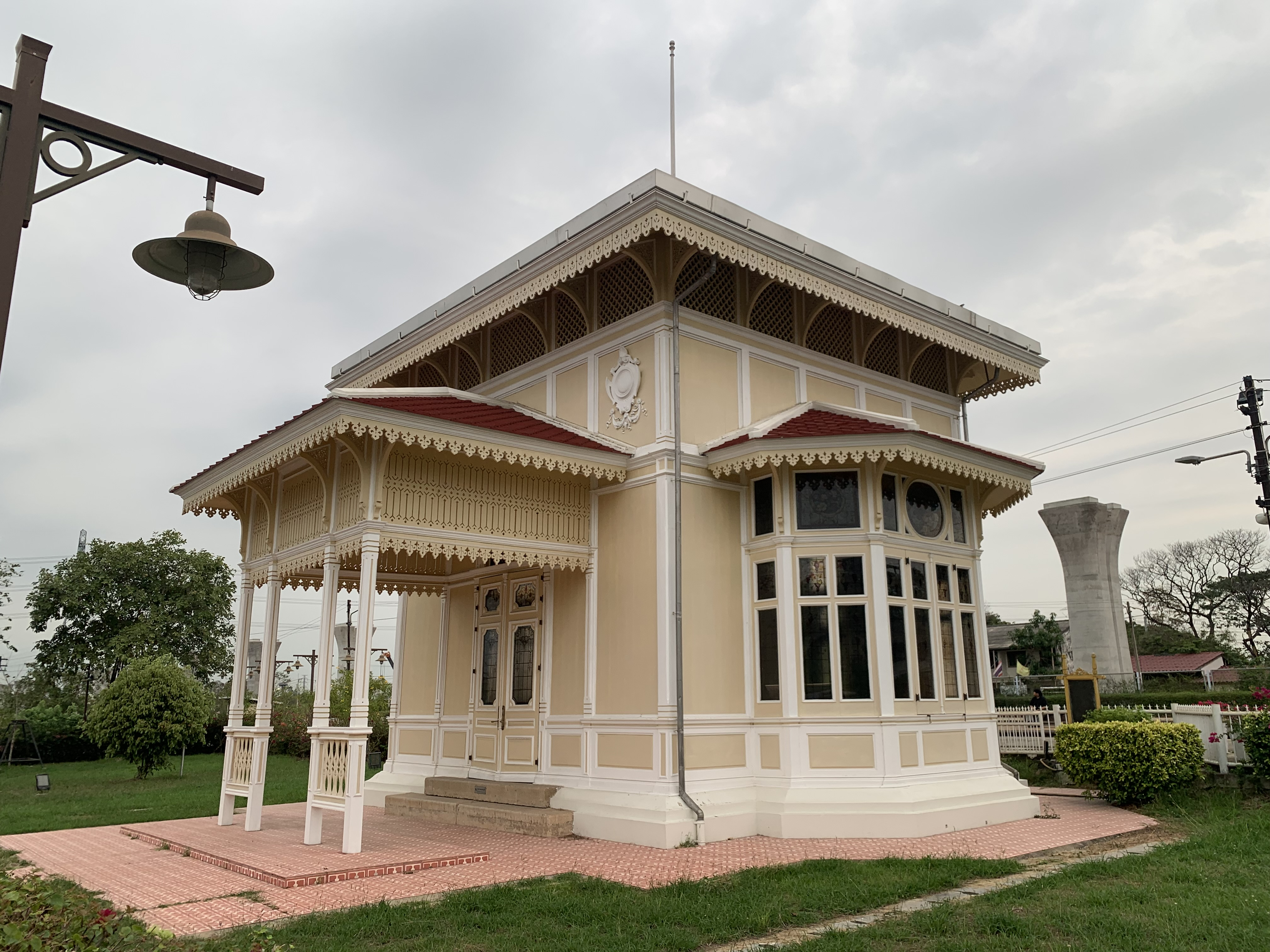
Royal Pavilion
