= Phra Kaeo, Phra Nakhon Si Ayutthaya =

Phra Kaeo พระแก้ว
- Subdistrict Administrative Organization
- Interactive map of Phra Kaeo
- Coordinates: 14°26′06.0″N 100°39′58.8″E
- Country: Thailand
- Province: Phra Nakhon Si Ayutthaya
- District: Phachi

Government
  - Mayor: Samran Siriwan
  - Deputy Mayor: Jintana Kamsung

Area
  - Total: 12,117 km^{2} (4,678 sq mi)
- Time zone: UTC+7 (ICT)
- Postcode: 13140
- Area code: (+66) 02
- Website: https://prakaew.go.th

Phra Kaeo (Thai: พระแก้ว, pronounced [pʰráʔ kɛ̂ːw]), sometimes written as Phra Kaew, is a tambon (subdistrict) in Phachi District, the eastern part of Phra Nakhon Si Ayutthaya Province.

== History & toponymy ==
Phra Kaeo is a canton that is the passageway of the Northern Railway Line (together with the Isan Railway Line). In the 18th century, it used to be a route back from Vientiane of the Somdet Chaophraya Maha Kasatsuek (later King Rama I)'s army. He had just finished the war and brought back the Phra Kaeo Morakot (Emerald Buddha; commonly referred to as Phra Kaeo) together. He and the Buddha image stayed overnight here before going back to Bangkok. Since then, the quarter where he rested and temporarily enshrined the Phra Kaeo Morakt, hence the name "Phra Kaeo".

The result of the division of the new administrative area make Phra Kaeo Railway Station and Wat Phra Kaeo (the place where the Phra Kaeo Morakt was enshrined was later built as a temple) belonging to the neighbouring Krachio.

== Geography ==
Phra Kaeo is the western part of the district. Most of the land is clay with lowlands.

Adjoining areas are (from the north clockwise) Phai Lom in its district and Ban Chung in Nakhon Luang District, Krachio in its district, with Ban Chung in Nakhon Luang District.

== Administration ==
The entire area of Phra Kaeo is under the administration of the Subdistrict Administrative Organization (SAO) Phra Kaeo.

The seal of SAO Phra Kaeo shows Phra Kaeo Morakot in meditating posture along with the ears of rice adorned as a frame. Lower part is a handshake symbol.

The area also consists of seven administrative muban (village).

No.	Name	Thai
1.	Ban Rong Sung	บ้านโรงสูง
2.	Ban Don Phrom	บ้านดอนพรม
3.	Ban Wang Bon	บ้านวังบน
4.	Ban Nong Bua	บ้านหนองบัว
5.	Ban Nong Bua	บ้านหนองบัว
6.	Ban Wang Lang	บ้านวังล่าง
7.	Ban Ton Man	บ้านต้นหมัน

== Economy ==
Most of the population is engaged in farming.

== Places ==
- Wat Don Klang
- Wat Nong Bua
- Wat Suek
- Phra Kaeo Health Promotion Hospital

== Products ==
- Khao mak (Thai fermented rice)
- Fish sauce
- Fabric flowers

== Transportation ==
Phra Kaeo can be reached via Highway 33 (familiarly known as Suwannasorn Road). It may also be easily accessed by Phra Kaeo Railway Station of the State Railway of Thailand (SRT), with the railways as demarcation lines only.
