= Ban Pho railway station =

Railway station in Thailand

Ban Pho บ้านโพ
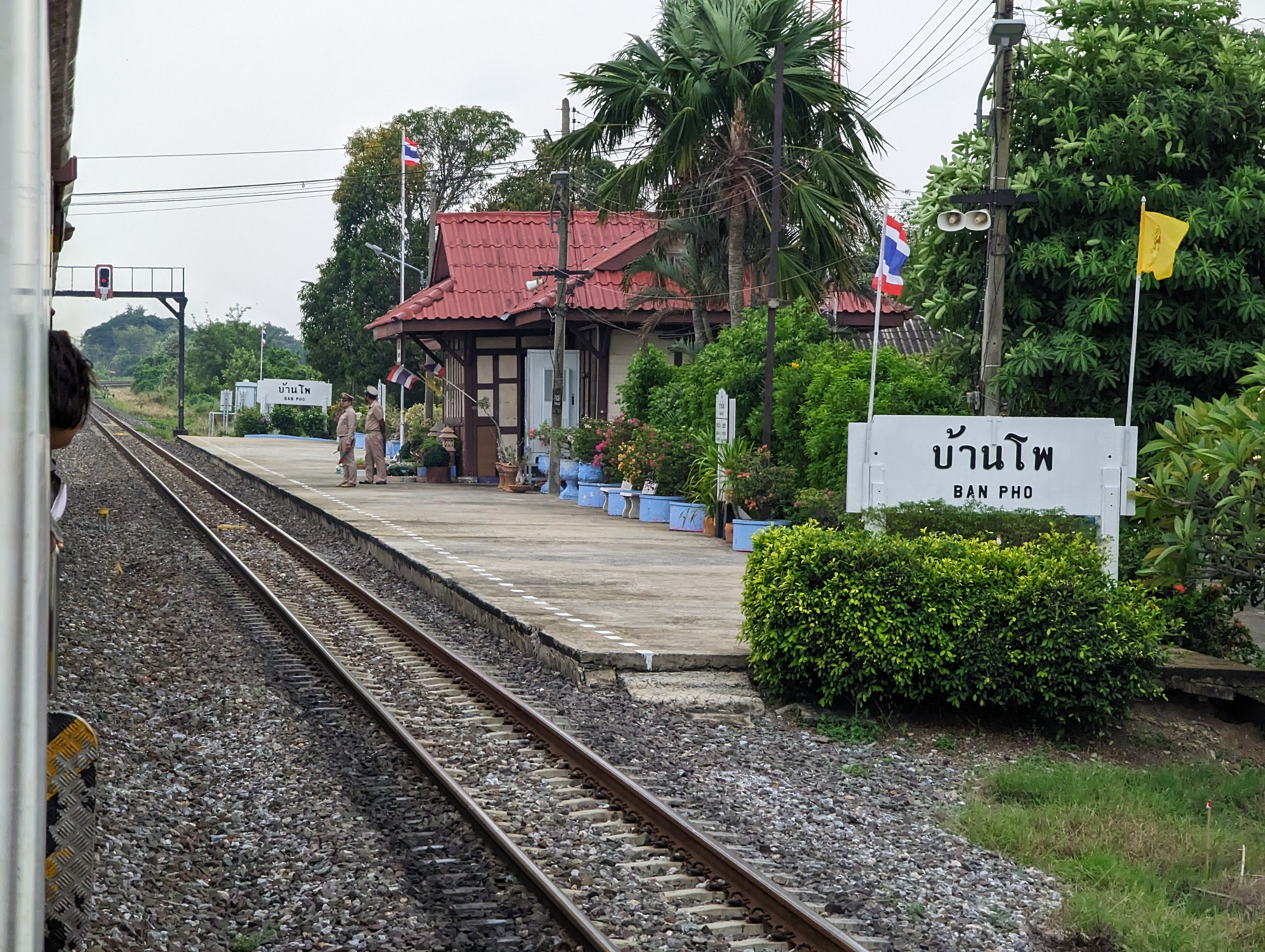

General information
- Location: Ban Pho Subdistrict, Bang Pa-In District, Phra Nakhon Si Ayutthaya; Thailand
- Coordinates: 14.2822°N 100.5886°E
- Owner: State Railway of Thailand
- Lines: Northern Line; Northeastern Line
- Platforms: 3
- Tracks: 3

Other information
- Station code: บพ.

Services
Preceding station	State Railway of Thailand	Following station
Bang Pa-In towards Hua Lamphong or Krung Thep Aphiwat	Northern Line	Ayutthaya towards Chiang Mai
Bang Pa-In towards Hua Lamphong or Krung Thep Aphiwat	Northeastern Line	Ayutthaya towards Ubon Ratchathani or Khamsavath (Laos)
Location

Ban Pho station (Thai: สถานีบ้านโพ) is a railway station located in Ban Pho Subdistrict, Bang Pa-In District, Phra Nakhon Si Ayutthaya. It is a class 3 railway station located 62.75 km (39.0 mi) from Bangkok railway station.
