= Wat San Chao =

- วัดศาลเจ้า
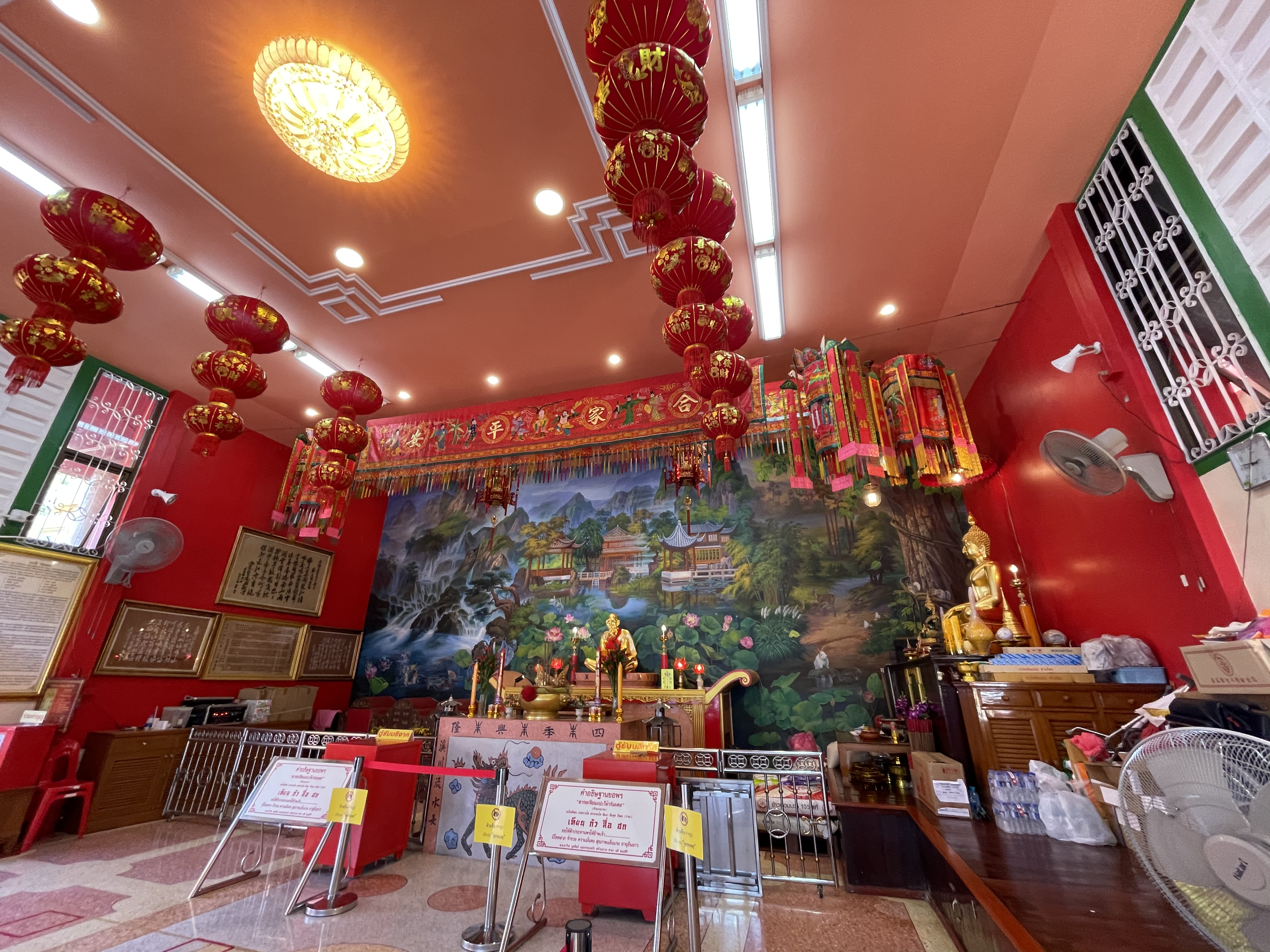
- Sian Pae Rong Si Shrine

- Location within Thailand

Religion
- Affiliation: Buddhism

Location
- Location: Ban Klang, Mueng Pathum Thani, Pathum Thani, Thailand
- Country: Thailand
- Interactive map of Wat San Chao
- Coordinates: 14.003056°N 100.541389°E

Wat San Chao (Thai: วัดศาลเจ้า, pronounced [wát sǎːn t͡ɕâw]) is an ancient Thai Buddhist temple in Mueang Pathum Thani district, Pathum Thani province on the northern outskirts Bangkok.

The temple has a history dating back to the late Ayutthaya period for at least 200 years. Believed that its creator was a Mon who fled from war in Burma (present-day Myanmar).

Wat San Chao is a small civil temple next to Wat Makham, another ancient temple and border to the Chao Phraya river and Khlong Chiang Rak canal. What makes it famous is that it is the location of Sian Pae Rong Si Shrine, a shrine is dedicated to Nathi Thongsiri or Ngow Kim Koi, a Chinese man who was highly respected by locals and the general public as an expert in Feng Shui and Chinese astrology. Affectionately known as Sian Pae Rong Si (เซียนแปะโรงสี). He was so loved by the locals for his tirelessness in assisting the locals with their ailments, financial difficulties, and in helping to change their luck around, from bad to good. He was a Chinese citizen who immigrated to Thailand when he was 10 years old and settled down to own a rice mill here and had transferred his nationality to Thai and had a Thai wife. During his life, he was a Feng Shui consultant for businessmen or leading companies in Thailand, such as CP Group.

Although he died in 1984, the public's faith in him continues today. Yantra amulets (fabric talisman) and medallions with his image have become popular amulets among Thai people, especially traders. This is believed to help business prosperity and success. His shrine was crowded with worshipers and oaths. It's only closed on Mondays.

In addition, another thing that attracts people to the temple is the Wat San Chao Floating Market, a riverside market is famous for its variety of Thai food and traditional desserts. Some types are rare, such as Khao chae (cooked rice served in cool fragrant water), etc. The market is only open on Saturdays and Sundays and public holidays.

== See also ==
- Thai amulet
- Feng Shui
