= Khlong Phutsa railway station =

Railway station in Thailand

Khlong Phutsa คลองพุทรา
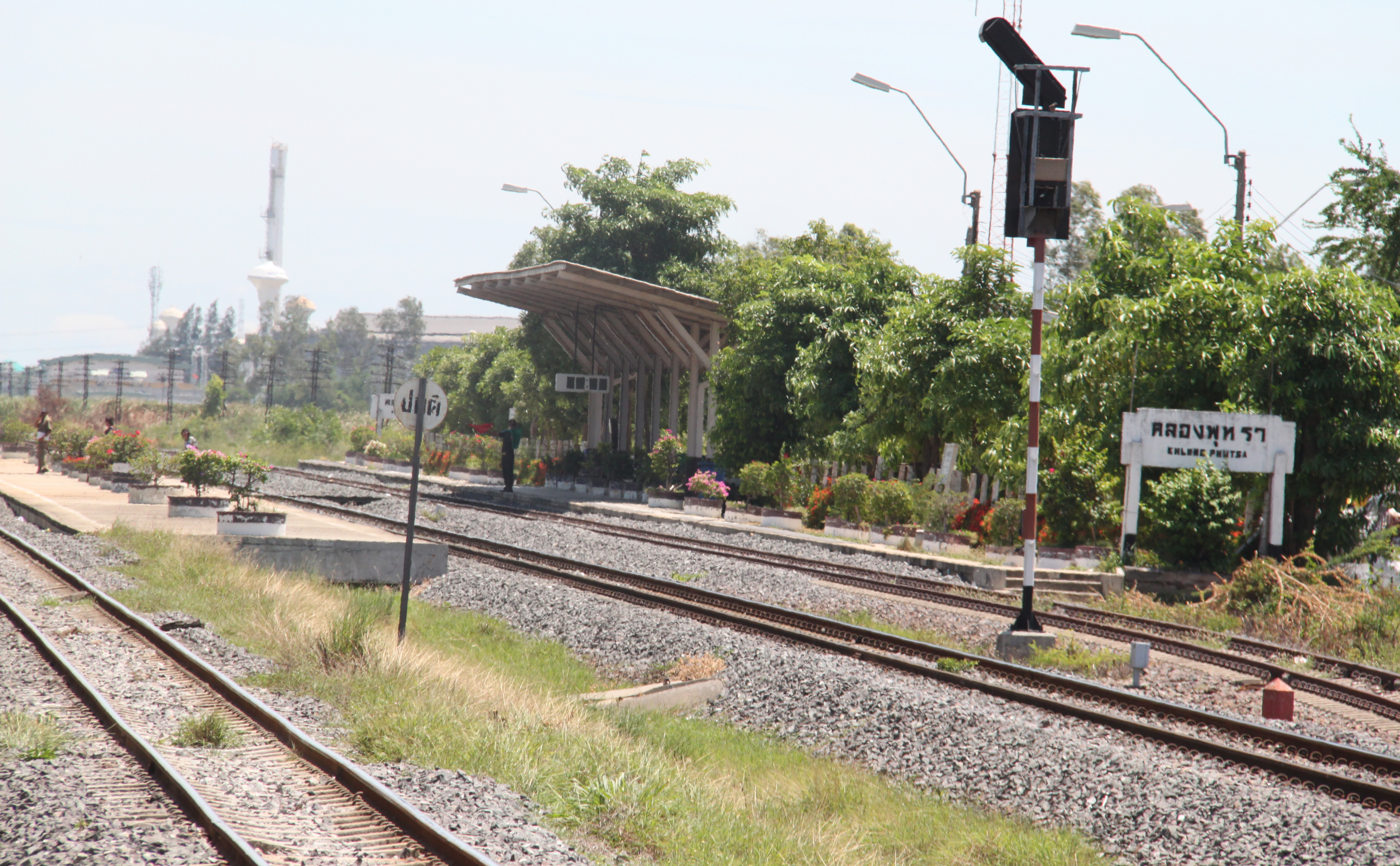
- Khlong Phutsa station

General information
- Location: Bang Krasan Subdistrict, Bang Pa-In District, Phra Nakhon Si Ayutthaya
- Coordinates: 14.185942°N 100.578245°E
- Owner: State Railway of Thailand
- Lines: Northern Line; Northeastern Line
- Platforms: 4
- Tracks: 5
- Connections: Local Transportation

Other information
- Station code: พซ.

Services
| Preceding station | State Railway of Thailand | Following station |
|---|---|---|
| Chiang Rak Noi towards Hua Lamphong or Krung Thep Aphiwat | Northern Line | Bang Pa-In towards Chiang Mai |
| Chiang Rak Noi towards Hua Lamphong or Krung Thep Aphiwat | Northeastern Line | Bang Pa-In towards Ubon Ratchathani or Khamsavath (Laos) |
Location

Khlong Phutsa railway station (Thai: สถานีรถไฟคลองพุทรา), is a railway station in Bang Krasan Subdistrict, Bang Pa-in District, Phra Nakhon Si Ayutthaya. It is owned by the State Railway of Thailand and is served by the Northern Line and the Northeastern Line. It is located 51.88 km (32.2 mi) from Bangkok railway station, and is a class 3 railway station.
