= Prachim Ratthaya Expressway =

Road in Thailand

Prachim Ratthaya Expressway ทางพิเศษประจิมรัถยา
- Si Rat–Outer Ring Road Expressway ทางพิเศษสายศรีรัช–วงแหวนรอบนอกกรุงเทพมหานคร

Route information
- Maintained by Bangkok Expressway and Metro
- Length: 16.7 km (10.4 mi)
- Existed: 22 August 2016–present

Major junctions
- West end: Outer Ring Road (West) (Kanchanaphisek Road)
- East end: Si Rat Expressway

Location
- Country: Thailand

Highway system
- Highways in Thailand; Motorways; Asian Highways

The Prachim Ratthaya Expressway (Thai: ทางพิเศษประจิมรัถยา), also known as the Si Rat–Outer Ring Road Expressway (Thai: ทางพิเศษสายศรีรัช–วงแหวนรอบนอกกรุงเทพมหานคร), is an expressway in Thailand, located in Bangkok and Nonthaburi province. The expressway is a controlled-access toll road.

== History ==
Prachim Ratthaya Expressway was completed and opened in its entirety on 22 August 2016. It connects Si Rat Expressway to Outer Ring Road (West) (Kanchanaphisek Road). The expressway's name Prachim Ratthaya was bestowed by King Vajiralongkorn, meaning "Road to the West".

According to an official EXAT annual report, the expressway was used by 18,466,598 cars in the 2022 fiscal year, with an average of 50,594 cars per day.

== Route ==
Kilometre 0 is counted at Kanchanaphisek Interchange.

Prachim Ratthaya Expressway
Location	km	Eastbound		Facility		Westbound	
Location	km	Exit destinations (road)	Toll Plaza (Entry)	English	Thai	Toll Plaza (Entry)	Exit destinations (road)
Bangkok	16.70	Northbound - Ngam Wong Wan, Chaeng Watthana ( Si Rat Expressway)	Bang Sue 1 (from Si Rat)	Si Rat Junction	ต่างระดับศรีรัช	Bang Sue 2 (to Si Rat) - exit only	Southbound - Phaya Thai, Phra Ram 9, Si Lom ( Si Rat Expressway)
Bangkok	16.70	Bangkok Bus Terminal, Chatuchak Park (Kamphaeng Phet Road)	-	Si Rat Junction	ต่างระดับศรีรัช	Kamphaeng Phet 2	-
Bangkok	12.85	Wong Sawang (Bangkok-Nonthaburi Road)	Rama VII Bridge	Pracha Rat 1 Interchange	แยกทางด่วนประชาราษฎร์สาย 1	Rama VII Bridge	Bang Pho (Pracha Rat 1 Road)
Bangkok	12.62	Expressway bridge over the Chao Phraya River					
Bangkok	11.95	Bang Kruai, EGAT (Charansanitwong Road)	Bang Kruai	Charansanitwong Interchange	แยกทางด่วนจรัญสนิทวงศ์	-	Bang Kruai, EGAT (Charansanitwong Road)
Nonthaburi	7.40	-	Bang Bamru	Bang Kruai Interchange	แยกทางด่วนบางกรวย	Bang Phlat	Bang Bamru railway station, Bang Phlat (Sirindhorn Road)
Bangkok	4.17	-	Taling Chan	Borommaratchachonnani Interchange	แยกทางด่วนบรมราชชนนี	-	Ratchaphruek Road, Suan Phak (Ratchaphruek Road)
Bangkok	4.17	-	Borommaratchachonnani	Borommaratchachonnani Interchange	แยกทางด่วนบรมราชชนนี	-	Ratchaphruek Road, Suan Phak (Ratchaphruek Road)
Bangkok	0.00	-	Chim Phli	Kanchanaphisek Interchange	แยกกาญจนาภิเษก	-	Taling Chan, Bang Yai ( AH2 Kanchanaphisek Road)

== See also ==
- Controlled-access highways in Thailand
- Expressway Authority of Thailand
