= Ban Don Klang railway halt =

Railway stop in Krachio, Thailand

Ban Don Klang บ้านดอนกลาง

General information
- Location: Rural Road No.5026, Krachio Subdistrict, Phachi District; Phra Nakhon Si Ayutthaya Province; Thailand
- Coordinates: 14.415302°N 100.658689°E
- Operator: State Railway of Thailand
- Manager: Ministry of Transport
- Distance: 82.390 km (51.2 mi) from Hua Lamphong
- Platforms: 2
- Tracks: 3

Other information
- Station code: ลก.
- Classification: Halt

Services
Preceding station	State Railway of Thailand	Following station
Map Phra Chan towards Hua Lamphong or Krung Thep Aphiwat	Northern Line	Phra Kaeo towards Chiang Mai
Map Phra Chan towards Hua Lamphong or Krung Thep Aphiwat	Northeastern Line	Phra Kaeo towards Ubon Ratchathani or Khamsavath (Laos)
Location

Ban Don Klang Halt (Thai: ที่หยุดรถบ้านดอนกลาง) is a railway halt located in Krachio Subdistrict, Phachi District, Phra Nakhon Si Ayutthaya, Thailand. It is located 82.390 km (51.2 mi) from Hua Lamphong.
