= Ekkapot Wongnak =

Thai musical artist and politician

- เอกพจน์ วงศ์นาค

Mayor of Khlong Luang municipality
- Incumbent
- Assumed office 31 May 2021

Personal details
- Born: Ekkapot Panyaem; 1 June 1969 (age 56) Pathum Thani Province, Thailand
- Party: Democrat Party; Thai Nation Party
- Musical career
- Genres: Luk thung
- Occupation: Singer · politician
- Instrument: Vocals
- Years active: 1984–1995
- Label: Sure Entertainment

Ekkapot Panyaem, known by the stage name Ekkapot Wongnak (Thai: เอกพจน์ วงศ์นาค, born 1 June 1969), is a Thai politician and Luk thung singer who was best known in the late 1980s. He sang The Pity Draftee (ทหารเกณฑ์คนจน), The Secret Dream (แอบฝัน), Love by Your Smiling (รักเพราะรอยยิ้ม) and The Dirty Letter (จดหมายเปื้อนฝุ่น). He retired in 1995 to have a political career.

== Musical career ==
He began his career in 1984 at the recommendation of Der Doksadao. He signed with Sure Entertainment in 1986. His first successful song was The Pity Draftee, written by Pheng Panyeam and composed by Jittakorn Buaniam.

After that, he collaborated with Sunaree Ratchasima and released three studio albums.

== Political career and corruption ==
He retired from music to contest the 1995 Thai general election and was elected as a member of the House of Representatives of Thailand on behalf Thai Democrat Party. He was on the committee of the Thai Nation Party, but was banned from politics for five years upon the dissolution of the Thai Nation Party by the Constitutional Court in 2008.

In 2021, he was elected as mayor of Khlong Luang municipality.

In May 2023, he arrested by the Royal Thai Police for political corruption related to a landfill in Khlong Luang. He was convicted of embezzling US$89,114.64.

== Health ==
In 2020, he developed lymphoma, but was declared healthy in 2021.

== Partial discography ==
- 1986 : The Pity Draftee (ทหารเกณฑ์คนจน)
- 1988 :
  - The Secret Dream (แอบฝัน)
  - Love by Your Smiling (รักเพราะรอยยิ้ม)
  - The Dirty Letter (จดหมายเปื้อนฝุ่น)
  - Have a boyfriend but don't tell (มีแฟนแล้วไม่บอก)
