= Ko Koet =

River island in Thailand

Coordinates: 14.196851°N 100.556389°E

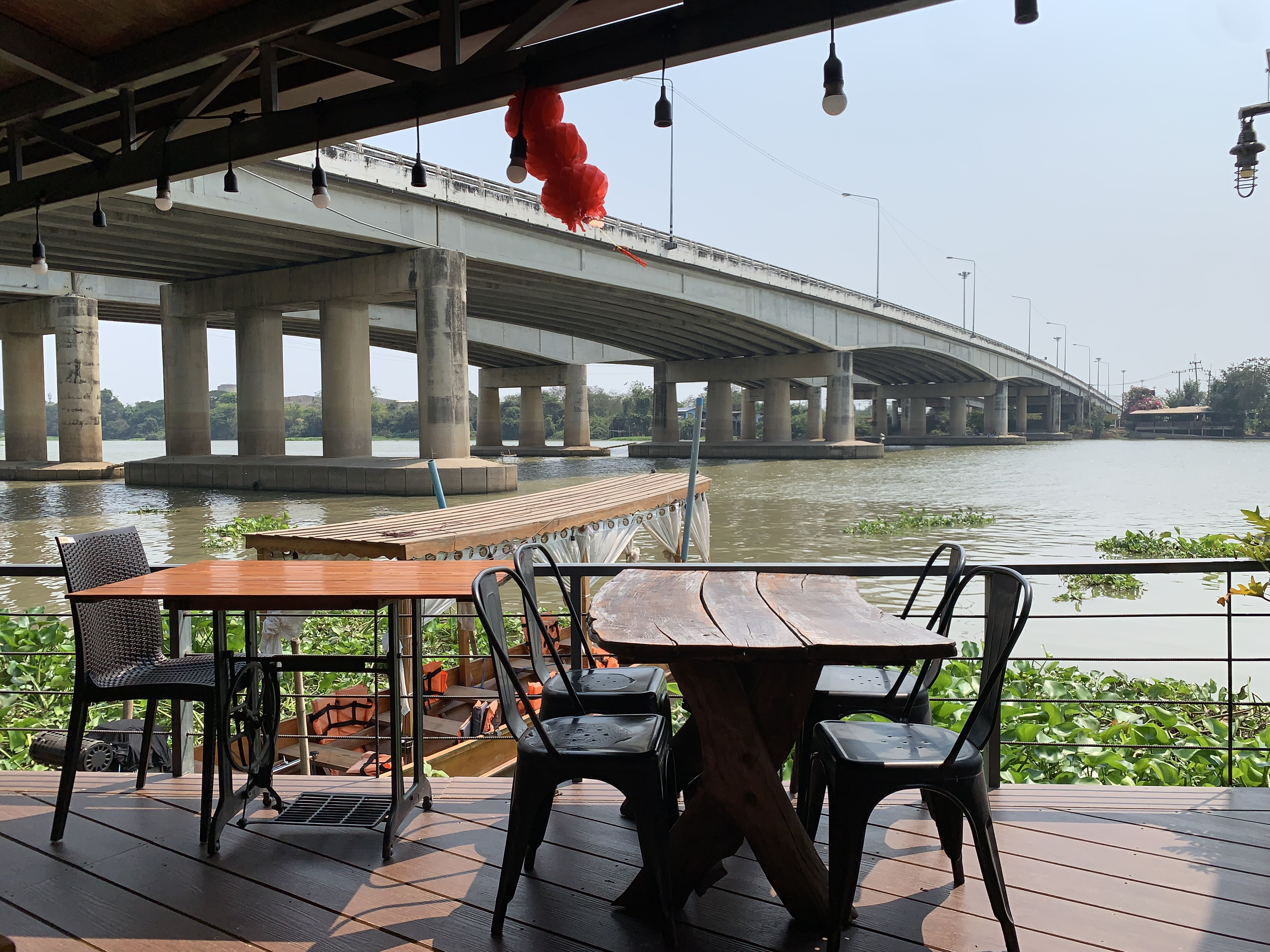
Riverside restaurant and the bridge, Ko Koet in 2025

Ko Koet (Thai: เกาะเกิด, pronounced [kɔ̀ʔ kɤ̀ːt]) is an island in the Chao Phraya River in the area of Bang Pa-in district, southern part of Phra Nakhon Si Ayutthaya province, central Thailand.

== History ==
Ko Koet was formed from the Chao Phraya River that flows through it and blowing the sediment to accumulate for a long time, until it formed an island in the middle of the river. Hence the name Ko Koet, which means "formed island".

== Geography ==
The area is plain with rivers emptying through it.

Neighbouring places are (from the north clockwise): Ban Phlap in its district, Bang Krasan in its district, and Sanam Chai in Bang Sai district, respectively.

It is about 13 km (8.1 mi) from the district office.

== Administration ==
Ko Koet is a tambon (sub-district) of Bang Pa-in district.

The tambon is administered by the Subdistrict Administrative Organization (SAO) Kho Koet (องค์การบริหารส่วนตำบลเกาะเกิด).

== Economy ==
Most of the residents have a career in fruit farming. Tourism is one of the main sources of income here, now it has been promoted to a cultural tourism destination to help learn about the way of life of the community. There are accommodations in form of homestay for visitors.

== Places ==
- Arts of Kingdom Museum
- Wat Phaya Yat
- Wat Choeng Tha

== Local products ==
- Thai herbal pills
- Mi krop (crisp noodles)
- Thai sweets
