= Expressway Authority of Thailand =

Thai state enterprise under the Ministry of Transport

Expressway Authority of Thailand (EXAT)

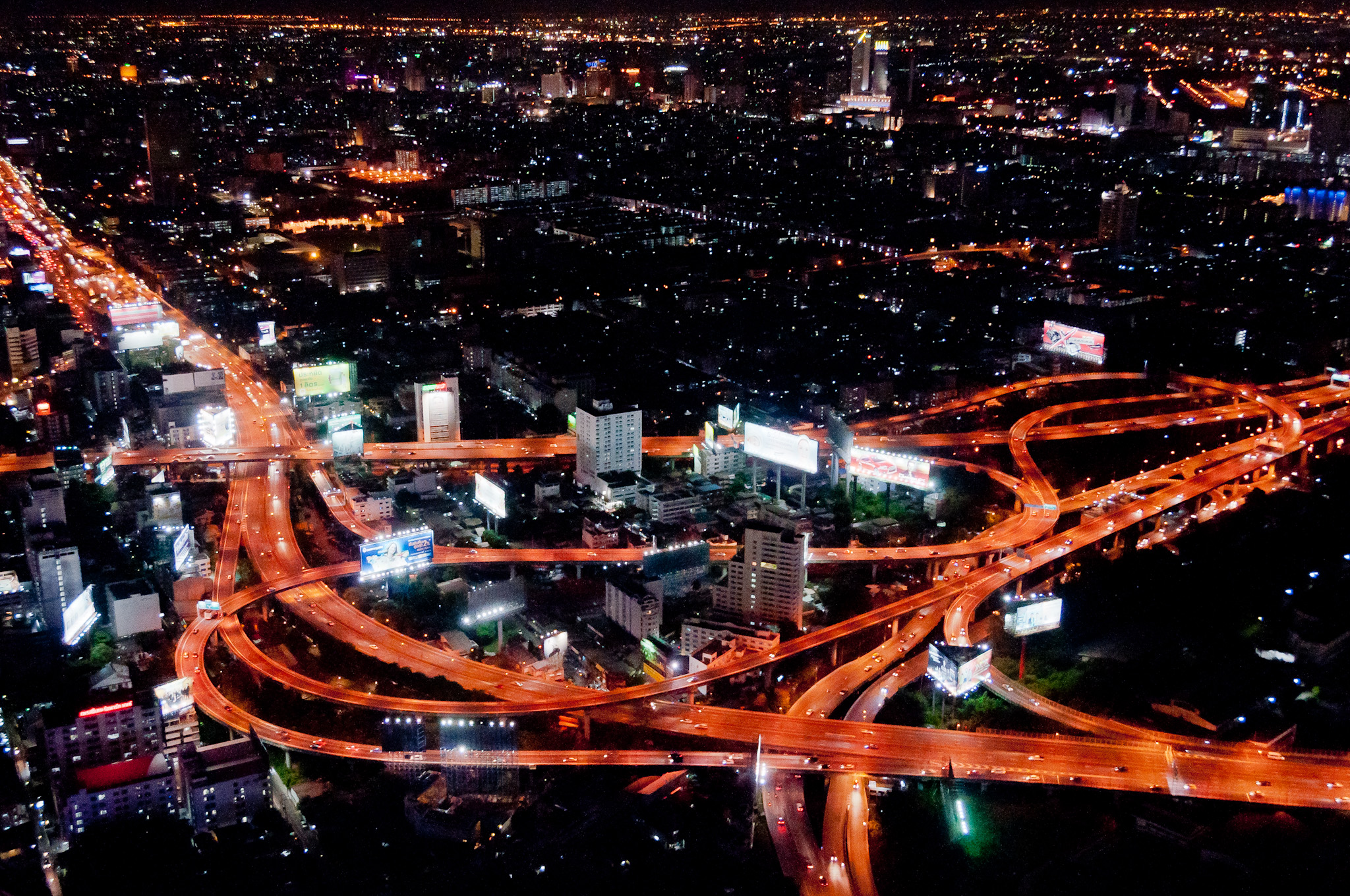
- Expressway in Bangkok
- Native name: การทางพิเศษแห่งประเทศไทย
- Romanized name: kan thang phiset haeng prathet thai
- Company type: State enterprise
- Industry: Greater Bangkok expressways
- Founded: November 27, 1972; 53 years ago in Bangkok, Thailand
- Headquarters: 111 Rimklong Bangkapi (Phetchauthai) Road., Bangkapi, Huai Kwang, Bangkok, Thailand
- Key people: Surachet Laophulsuk (Governor)
- Revenue: 16,060 million baht (2015)
- Total assets: 180,696 million baht (2015)
- Number of employees: 4,701 regular; 625 temp; (2015)
- Parent: Ministry of Transport
- Website: www.exat.co.th/en/

The Expressway Authority of Thailand (Thai: การทางพิเศษแห่งประเทศไทย) (EXAT) is a state enterprise under the Ministry of Transport. It was founded in 1972, and operates Thailand's expressway (ทางพิเศษ thang phiset) system, which refers to (usually elevated) high-capacity controlled-access highways serving the Greater Bangkok area and some nearby provinces.

EXAT does not operate the separate Thai motorway network, which covers intercity controlled-access highways.

== Expressway system ==
Sections of the expressway system

First opened in 1981, the system currently (2015) consists of seven expressways and four expressway links adding up to a total distance of 207.9 kilometres (129.2 mi), unchanged since FY2012. In 2013 the system served 594 million cars.

The constituent expressway systems are (in order of completion):

1. Chaloem Maha Nakhon Expressway (first stage Expressway System)
2. Si Rat Expressway (second stage Expressway System)
3. Chalong Rat Expressway (Ramindra – At Narong Expressway)
4. Burapha Withi Expressway (Bang Na Expressway)
5. Udon Ratthaya Expressway (Bang Pa-in – Pak Kret Expressway)
6. Third stage expressway System, S1 section (At Narong - Bang Na)
7. Bang Phli–Suk Sawat Expressway (South Kanchanaphisek ring road)
8. Ramindra–Outer Ring Road Expressway
9. Si Rat–Outer Ring Road Expressway

== Financials ==
Fiscal year 2015 (year ending 30 September 2015) revenues were 16,060 million baht on total assets of 180,696 million baht. It employed 4,701 regular and 625 temporary employees in FY2015. EXAT's top seven executives were remunerated 12.9 million baht total in FY2015.

== See also ==
- Controlled-access highways in Thailand
