= Uruphong =

Coordinates: 13°44′22.12″N 100°31′24.52″E

- อุรุพงษ์
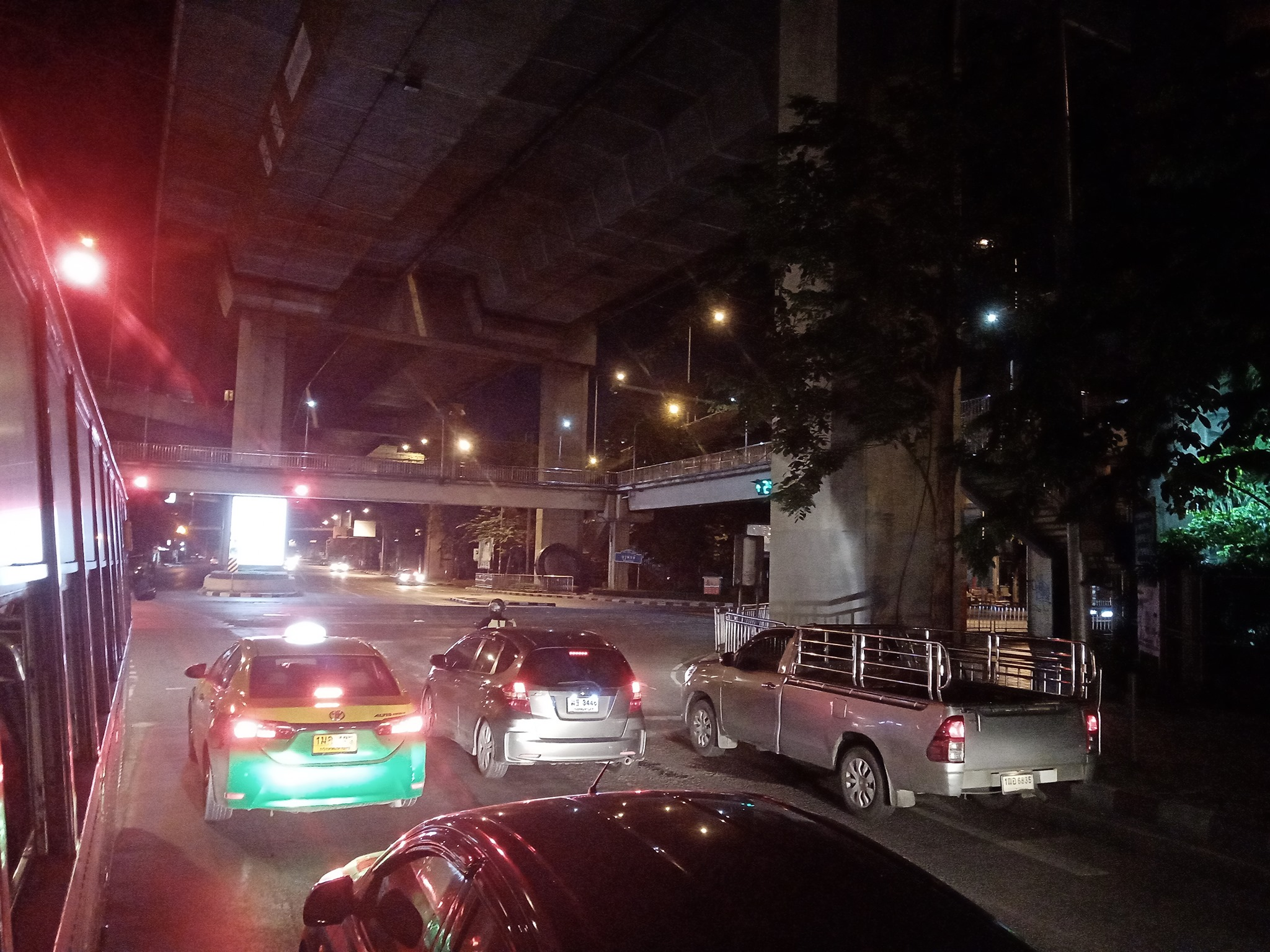
- Uruphong Intersection viewed from the Rama VI side at dawn
- Interactive map of Uruphong

Location
- Thung Phaya Thai, Thanon Phetchaburi, Ratchathewi, Bangkok, Thailand
- Roads at junction: Rama VI (north–south); Phetchaburi (east–west)

Construction
- Type: Four-way at-grade intersection with four-way footbridge and Si Rat Expressway

Uruphong (Thai: อุรุพงษ์, RTGS: Uruphong, pronounced [ʔù.rū.pʰōŋ]) is a four-way intersection and neighbourhood in Thailand. It is located in the Thung Phaya Thai and Thanon Phetchaburi sub-districts, which are part of the Ratchathewi district in downtown Bangkok. It connects Rama VI and Phetchaburi Roads, beneath both a pedestrian overpass and an elevated expressway. It is considered the starting point of Phetchaburi Road and is near several landmarks, including the Yommarat railway halt, the Ministry of Foreign Affairs, Phaya Thai Palace, Ramathibodi Hospital, Phramongkutklao Hospital, and Victory Monument.

The name "Uruphong" comes from a bridge that historically crossed a nearby canal. This bridge was built to commemorate Prince Urubongs Rajsombhoj, a son of King Chulalongkorn (Rama V), who died in childhood. The bridge and canal were later removed to make way for Phetchaburi Road, but the name "Uruphong" has remained.

From October 10 to November 7, 2013, the intersection served as a protest site against the Yingluck Shinawatra government. The protests were led by the Network of Students and People for Reform of Thailand (NSPRT), a group separate from both the People's Movement to Overthrow the Thaksin Regime (Pefot) and the Dharma Army. NSPRT was organized by students from Ramkhamhaeng University; later, the group became part of the People's Democratic Reform Committee (PDRC).
