= Chiang Rak Noi railway station =

Railway station in Thailand

Coordinates: 14.1313°N 100.5818°E

Chiang Rak Noi เชียงรากน้อย
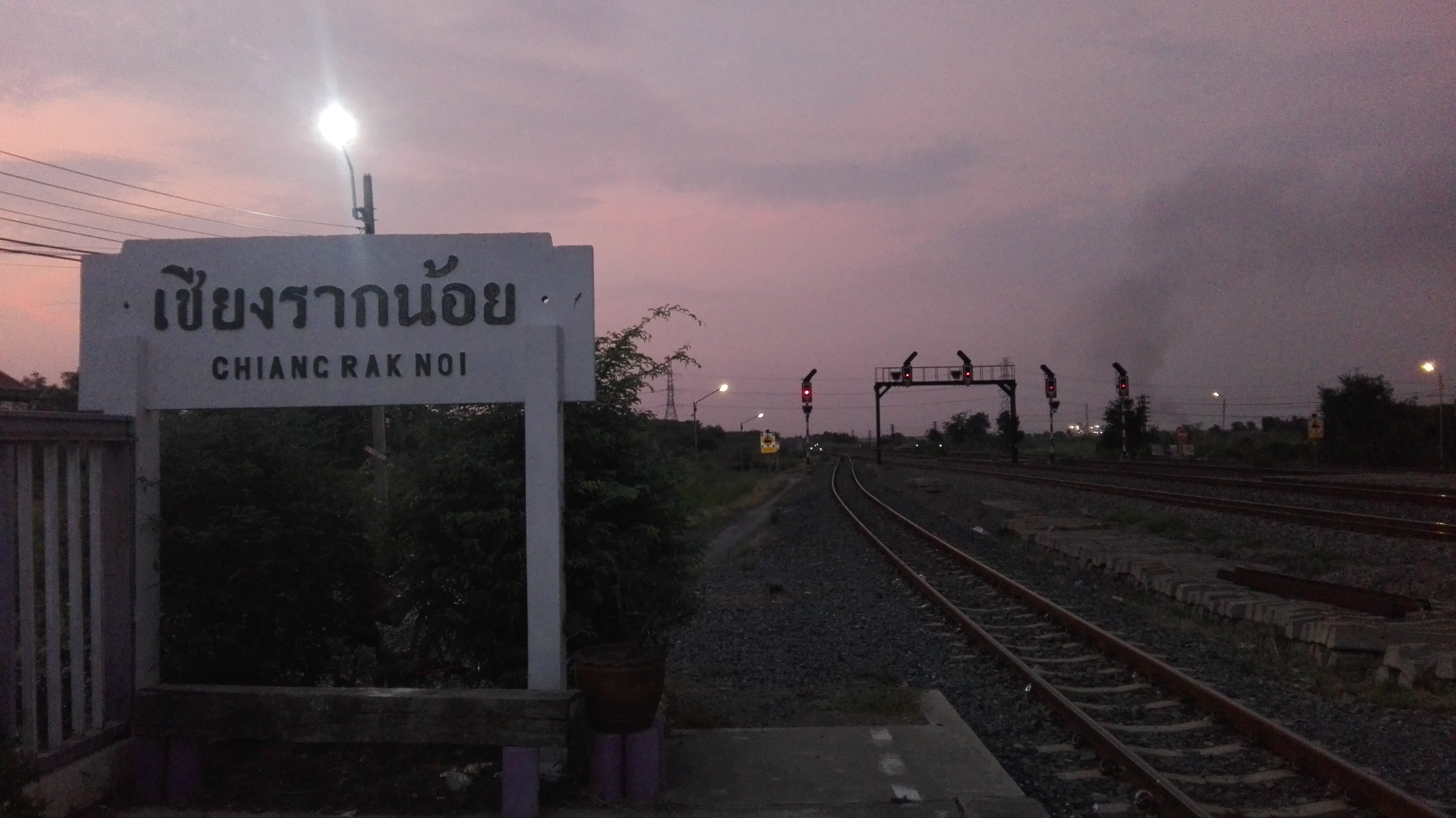

General information
- Location: Chiang Rak Noi Subdistrict, Bang Pa-in District, Phra Nakhon Si Ayutthaya
- Owner: State Railway of Thailand (SRT)
- Lines: Northern Line; Northeastern Line
- Platforms: 3
- Tracks: 4

Other information
- Station code: ชน.

Services
Preceding station	State Railway of Thailand	Following station
Nava Nakhon Halt towards Hua Lamphong or Krung Thep Aphiwat	Northern Line	Khlong Phutsa towards Chiang Mai
Nava Nakhon Halt towards Hua Lamphong or Krung Thep Aphiwat	Northeastern Line	Khlong Phutsa towards Ubon Ratchathani or Khamsavath (Laos)
Location

Chiang Rak Noi station (Thai: สถานีเชียงรากน้อย) is a railway station in Chiang Rak Noi Sub-district, Bang Pa-in District, Phra Nakhon Si Ayutthaya. It is a class 2 railway station 46.01 km (28.6 mi) from Bangkok railway station. Chiang Rak Noi station is also the location of a TPI Polene cement depot.
