= Map Phra Chan railway station =

Railway station in Thailand

Coordinates: 14.4025°N 100.6320°E

Map Phra Chan มาบพระจันทร์
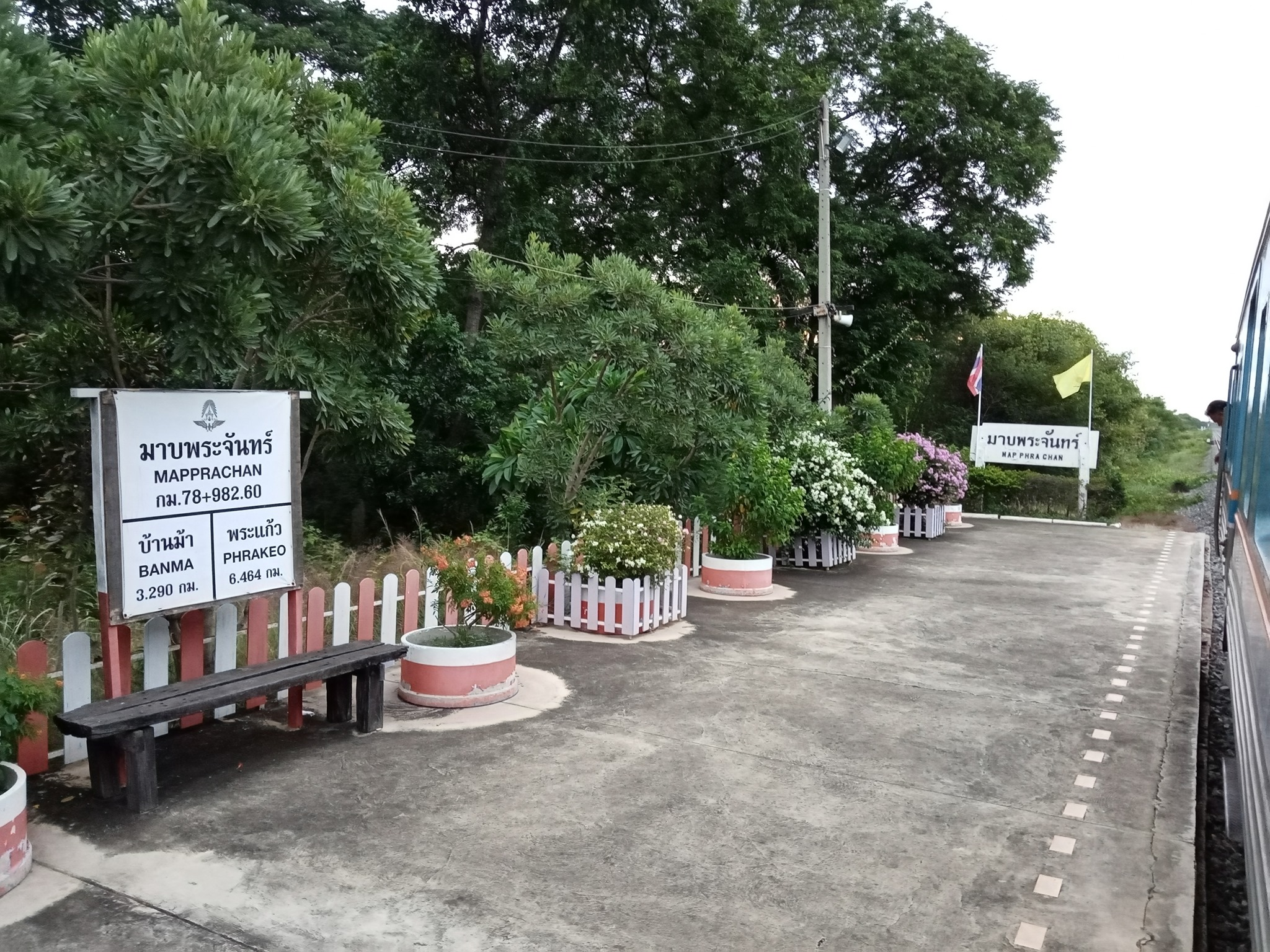

General information
- Location: Nong Pling Subdistrict, Nakhon Luang District; Phra Nakhon Si Ayutthaya Province; Thailand
- Operator: State Railway of Thailand
- Manager: Ministry of Transport

Other information
- Station code: บจ.
- Classification: Class 3

Services
Preceding station	State Railway of Thailand	Following station
Ban Ma towards Hua Lamphong or Krung Thep Aphiwat	Northern Line	Ban Don Klang Halt towards Chiang Mai
Ban Ma towards Hua Lamphong or Krung Thep Aphiwat	Northeastern Line	Ban Don Klang Halt towards Ubon Ratchathani or Khamsavath (Laos)
Location

Map Phra Chan railway station is a railway station located in Nong Pling Subdistrict, Nakhon Luang District, Phra Nakhon Si Ayutthaya. It is a class 3 railway station located 78.982 km (49.1 mi) from Bangkok railway station.
