= Ban Ma railway station =

Railway station in Thailand

Ban Ma บ้านม้า
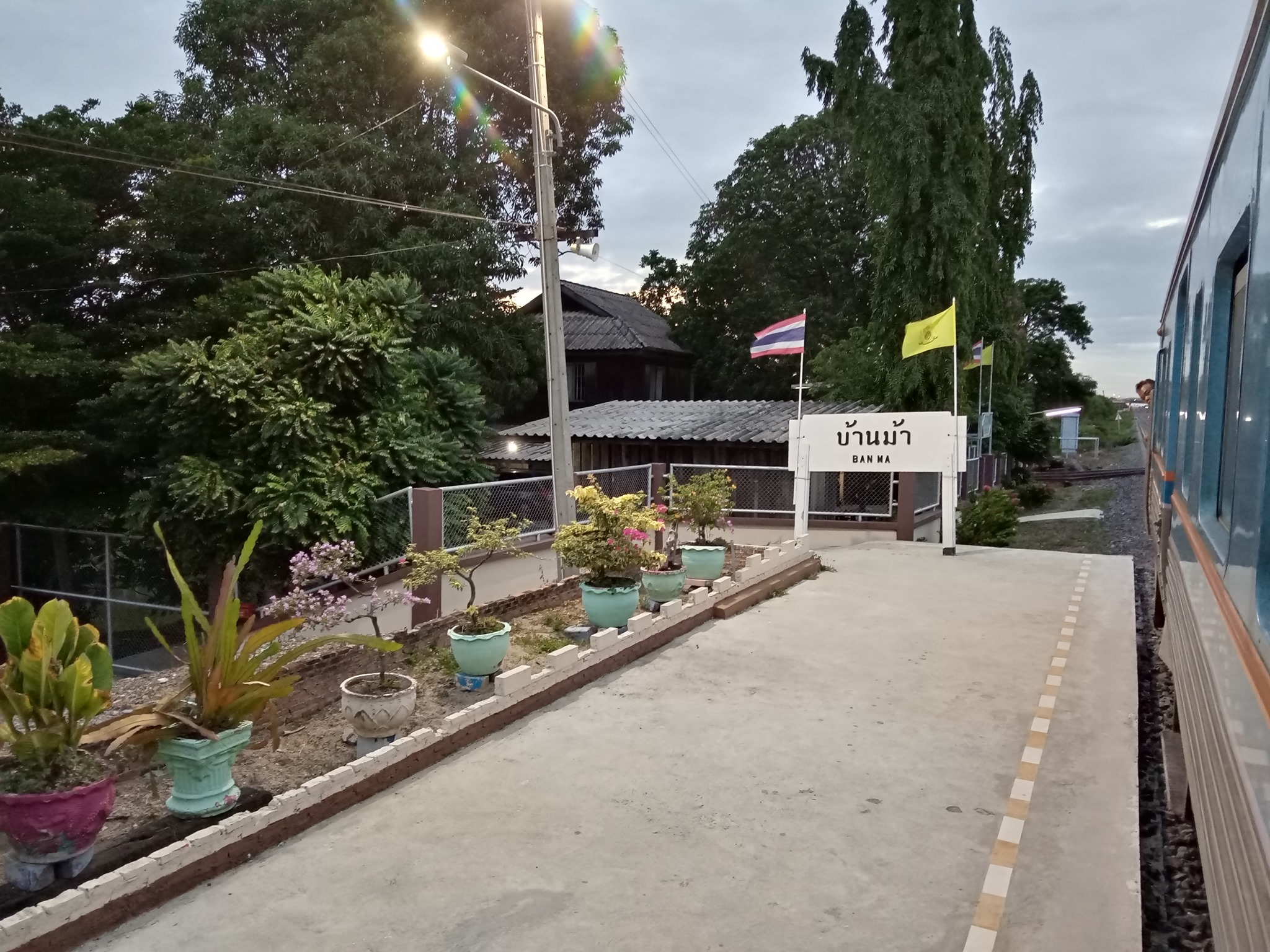

General information
- Location: Ban Ko Subdistrict, Phra Nakhon Si Ayutthaya District; Phra Nakhon Si Ayutthaya Province; Thailand
- Coordinates: 14.3842°N 100.5971°E
- Operator: State Railway of Thailand
- Manager: Ministry of Transport
- Platforms: 4
- Tracks: 4

Other information
- Station code: มา.
- Classification: Class 3

Services
Preceding station	State Railway of Thailand	Following station
Ayutthaya towards Hua Lamphong or Krung Thep Aphiwat	Northern Line	Map Phra Chan towards Chiang Mai
Ayutthaya towards Hua Lamphong or Krung Thep Aphiwat	Northeastern Line	Map Phra Chan towards Ubon Ratchathani or Khamsavath (Laos)
Location

Ban Ma station (Thai: บ้านม้า) is a railway station located in Ban Ko Subdistrict, Ayutthaya City, Phra Nakhon Si Ayutthaya. It is a class 3 railway station located 74.692 km (46.4 mi) from Bangkok railway station.
