= Ayutthaya railway station =

Railway station in Phra Nakhon Si Ayutthaya, Thailand

Ayutthaya อยุธยา
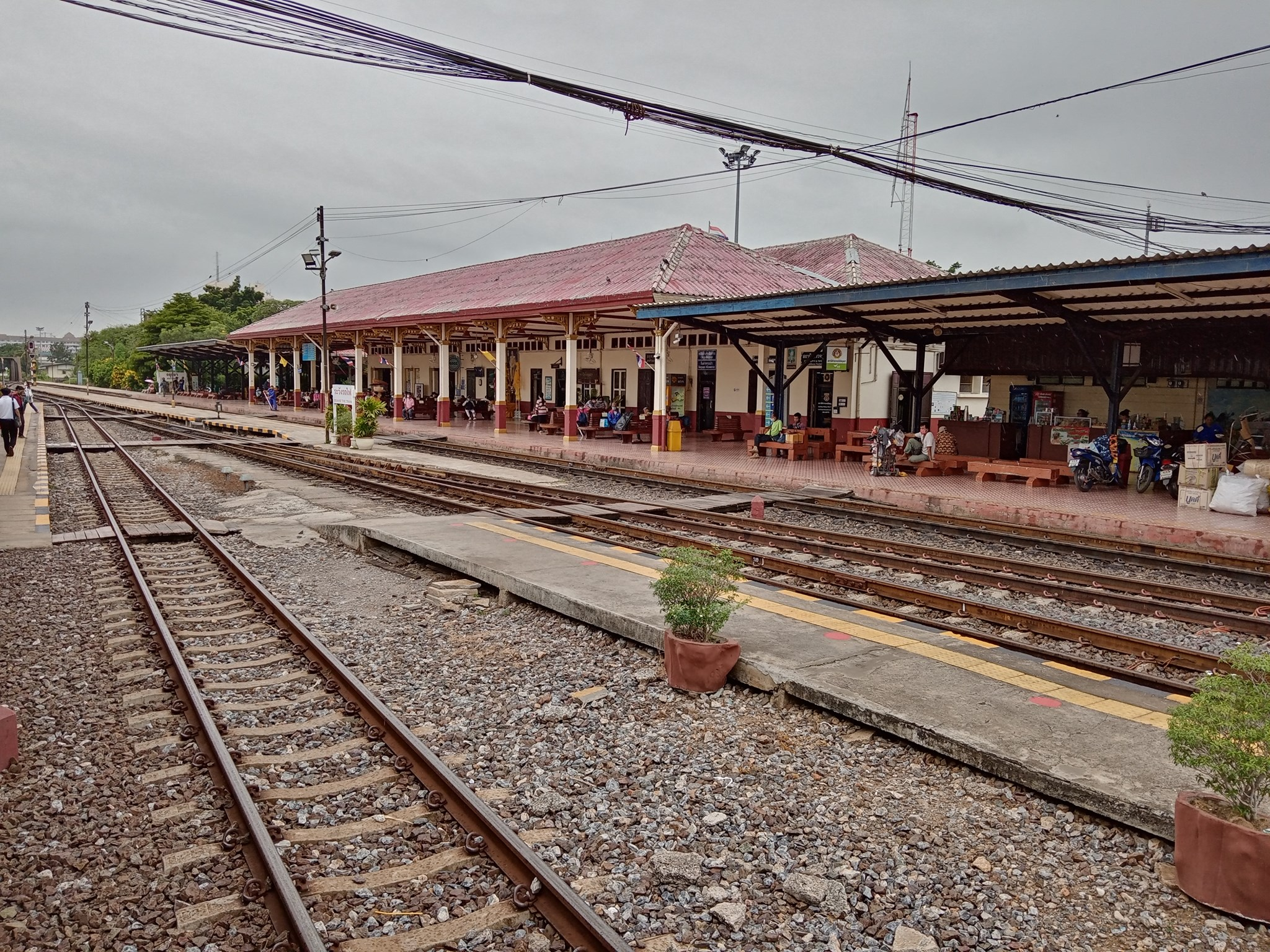
- The station in mid-2020

General information
- Location: Kramang Sub-district, Ayutthaya; Phra Nakhon Si Ayutthaya province Thailand
- Coordinates: 14.3567°N 100.5830°E
- Operator: State Railway of Thailand
- Manager: Ministry of Transport
- Platforms: 3
- Tracks: 6

Construction
- Structure type: Concrete building
- Parking: Yes
- Cycle facilities: Yes
- Accessible: Yes

Other information
- Station code: อย.
- Classification: Class 1

History
- Opened: 26 March 1896
- Rebuilt: 1921
- Former names: Krung Kao

Passengers
- 10,000–12,000 daily

Services
Preceding station	State Railway of Thailand	Following station
Ban Pho towards Hua Lamphong or Krung Thep Aphiwat	Northern Line	Ban Ma towards Chiang Mai
Ban Pho towards Hua Lamphong or Krung Thep Aphiwat	Northeastern Line	Ban Ma towards Ubon Ratchathani or Khamsavath (Laos)
Location

Ayutthaya station (Thai: สถานีอยุธยา), is one of the main railway stations of the Northern Line and the Northeastern Line in Phra Nakhon Si Ayutthaya province, located 71 km (44.1 mi) away from Bangkok railway station. It serves 77 trains per day, equivalent to 10,000–12,000 people passing through daily. Every passenger train passing this station must stop here.

== History ==
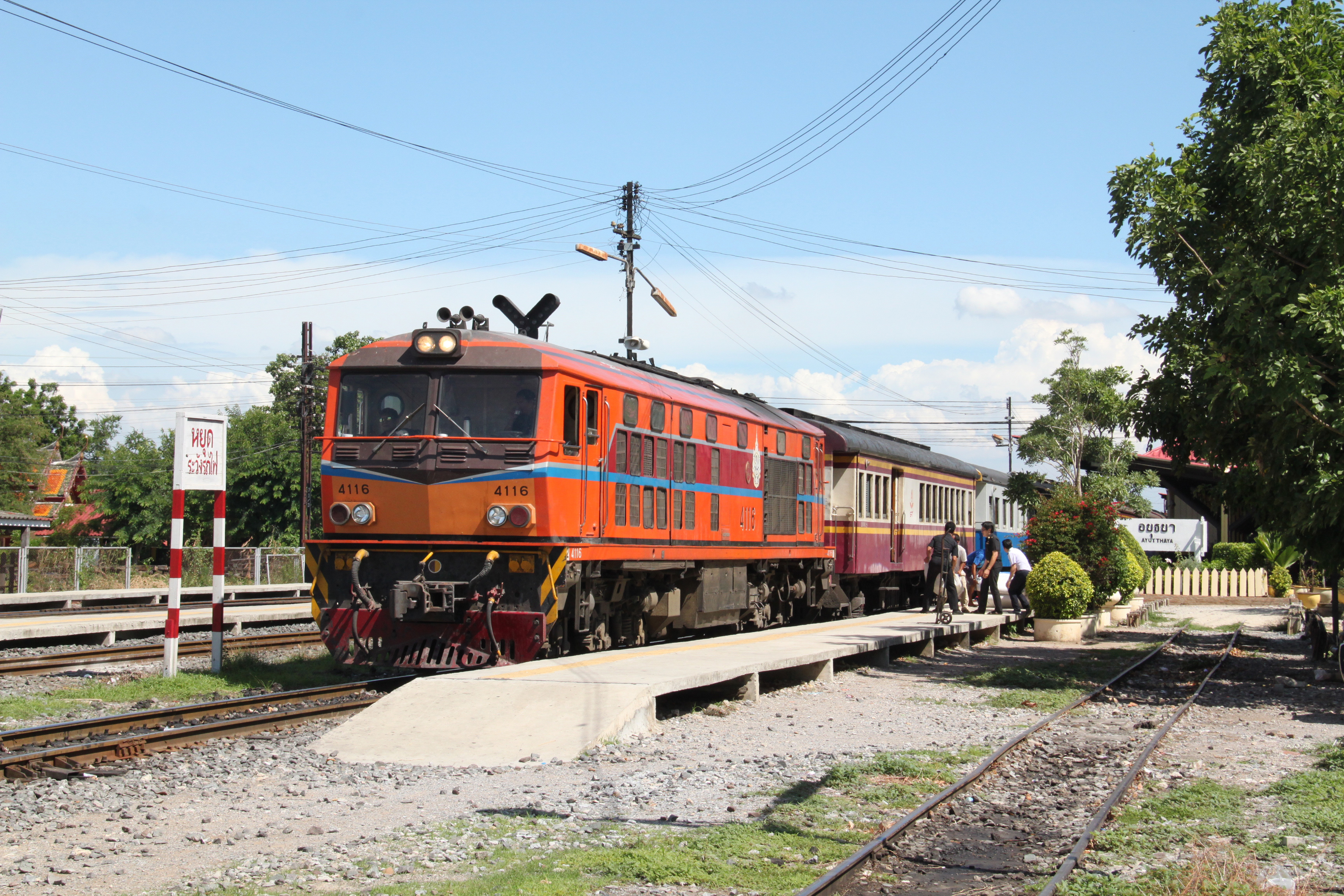
A train at Ayutthaya railway station

Ayutthaya railway station was built during the reign of King Chulalongkorn. Its name was "Krung Kao", in relation to the nearby Ayutthaya Historical Park. In 1921, it was rebuilt as a concrete building with metal bracing and renamed "Ayutthaya" in keeping with King Vajiravudh's national order of 1917. The name and structure remains in use today.

In addition, historically location of the station is also the site of Ayodhya. The first city before the establishment of Ayutthaya officially in 1351 by King Ramathibodi I (U-thong).
