= Phra Kaeo railway station =

Railway station in Thailand

Coordinates: 14.4286°N 100.6857°E

Phra Kaeo พระแก้ว

General information
- Location: Krachio Subdistrict, Phachi District; Phra Nakhon Si Ayutthaya Province; Thailand
- Operator: State Railway of Thailand
- Manager: Ministry of Transport
- Distance: 85.445 km (53.1 mi) from Hua Lamphong
- Platforms: 4
- Tracks: 4

Construction
- Structure type: At-grade

Other information
- Station code: พก.
- Classification: Class 3

Services
| Preceding station | State Railway of Thailand | Following station |
|---|---|---|
| Ban Don Klang Halt towards Hua Lamphong or Krung Thep Aphiwat | Northern Line | Ban Phachi Junction towards Chiang Mai |
| Ban Don Klang Halt towards Hua Lamphong or Krung Thep Aphiwat | Northeastern Line | Ban Phachi Junction towards Ubon Ratchathani or Khamsavath (Laos) |
Location

Phra Kaeo railway station is a railway station located in Krachio Subdistrict, Phachi District, Phra Nakhon Si Ayutthaya. It is a class 3 railway station located 85.445 km (53.1 mi) from Hua Lamphong.
