= Chiang Rak Noi, Bang Pa-in =

Subdistrict in Ayutthaya, Thailand

Coordinates: 14.148432°N 100.617094°E

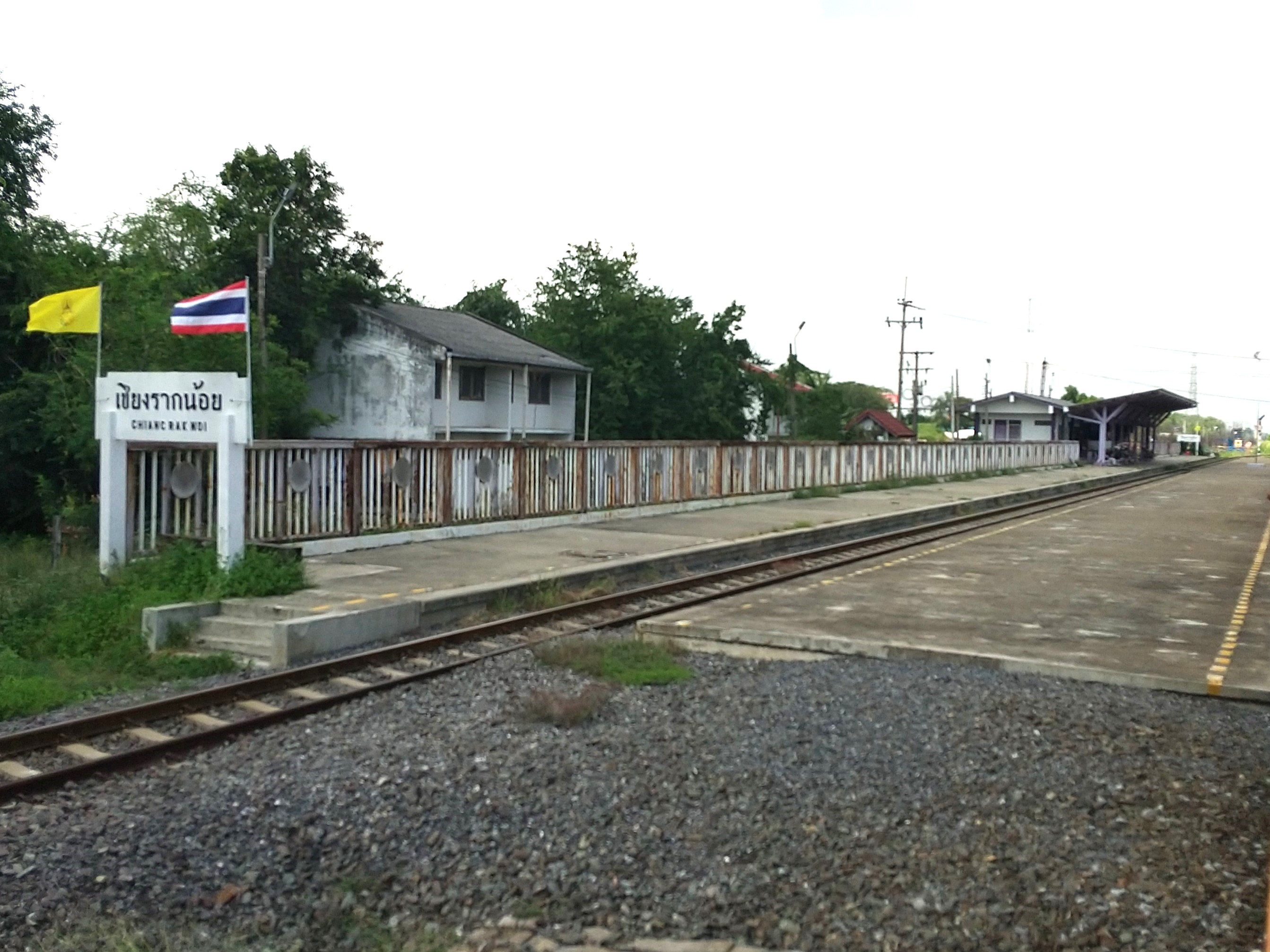
Chiang Rak Noi railway station in 2023

Chiang Rak Noi (Thai: เชียงรากน้อย, pronounced [tɕʰīaŋ raːk̚˥ nɔ́ːj]) is a tambon (subdistrict) in Bang Pa-in district, lower part of Phra Nakhon Si Ayutthaya province.

== History ==
Chiang Rak Noi is part of the vast Chiang Rak plains in the Chao Phraya basin of central Thailand. It was originally governed by the Chiang Rak Noi Subdistrict Administrative Organization, but in 2007 this local government elevated it to a Subdistrict Municipality.

== Geography ==
The terrain is a lowland, flooded, and most of the area is used for community and agriculture. Important water resources include Khlong Phutsa, which flows through the upper part, and Khlong Chiang Rak Noi, which flows through the lower part.

Chiang Rak Noi has a total area of 32.685 km^{2}, approximately 7.50 km (4.7 mi) southeast of downtown Bang Pa-in and approximately 26 km (16.2 mi) from city of Phra Nakhon Si Ayutthaya.

It is bordered by Bang Krasan and Khlong Chik subdistricts in its district to the north; Wang Noi district in its province to the east, and Khlong Luang district in Pathum Thani province to the east and the south; and Bang Sai district in its province to the west.

== Climate ==
The weather is generally quite hot, similar to other subdistricts of the district and provinces in the central region. The southwest monsoon blows from the Gulf of Thailand, causing heavy rain between May and October of each year.

== Administration ==
Chiang Rak Noi is administered by two government bodies, which are Chiang Rak Noi Subdistrict Municipality and Phraintharacha Subdistrict Municipality.

It is also consists of 12 administrative mubans (villages).

No.	Name	Thai
1.	Ban Nong Hoi	บ้านหนองหอย
2.	Ban Nong Hoi	บ้านหนองหอย
3.	Ban Khlong Prem	บ้านคลองเปรม
4.	Ban Khlong Prem	บ้านคลองเปรม
5.	Ban Bueng Bon	บ้านบึงบอน
6.	Ban Phraintharacha	บ้านพระอินทราชา
7.	Ban Phraintharacha	บ้านพระอินทราชา (Note: No.6 and no.7 belong to Phraintharacha Subdistrict Municipality.)
8.	Ban Rong It	บ้านโรงอิฐ
9.	Ban Hua Khlong	บ้านหัวคลอง
10.	Ban Khlong Prem	บ้านคลองเปรม
11.	Ban Chiang Rak Noi	บ้านเชียงรากน้อย
12.	Ban Lam Ruea Taek	บ้านลำเรือแตก

== Transportation ==
The subdistrict is served by the Chiang Rak Noi railway station of the State Railway of Thailand (SRT), whose north and northeast lines runs through the area.

Chiang Rak Noi can also be accessed by National Highway 1, Phahon Yothin road.
