= Pracha Chuen Road =

Street in Thailand

Coordinates: 13.805926°N 100.533241°E

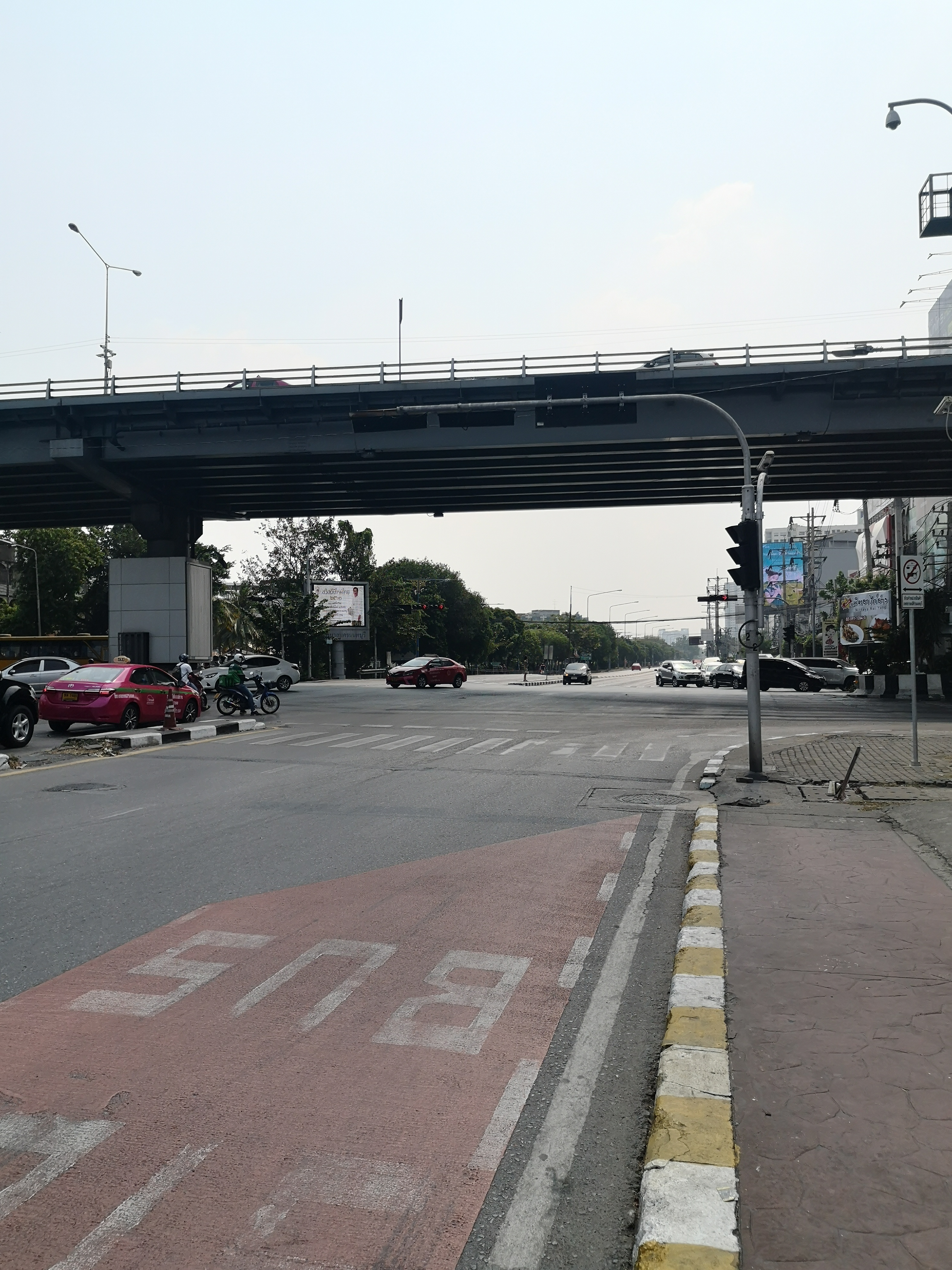
Pracha Chuen Road at Phong Phet Intersection, where it crosses Ngamwongwan Road (Highway 302), downtown Nonthaburi

Pracha Chuen Road (Thai: ถนนประชาชื่น, RTGS: Thanon Pracha Chuen, pronounced [tʰā.nǒn prā.t͡ɕʰāː t͡ɕʰɯ̂ːn]) is a road in Bangkok and its neighbouring Nonthaburi. It is also the name of the surrounding its location.

Pracha Chuen is the road runs along the west side of Khlong Prapa (water supply canal) for its entire length. It diverges from Pracharat Sai 2 Road near the Tao Pun area in Bang Sue, on the border of Chatuchak District, and heads northward, intersecting with various roads before terminating at Si Saman Road, which leads to the Office of the Permanent Secretary for Defence, in Pak Kret District, Nonthaburi.

The name "Pracha Chuen" means "the people rejoice" and was given by Prince Narathip Praphanphong, who also named Phloen Chit Road in central Bangkok, as he once had a residence in this area.

Pracha Chuen connects two main thoroughfares, Chaeng Watthana (Highway 304) and Ratchadaphisek (Inner Ring Road), and is also linked to the Si Rat Expressway. The road is home to many residences and important facilities, including Tesco Lotus Pracha Chuen, Bang Sue District Office, Pracha Chuen Metropolitan Waterworks Authority, Kasemrad Prachachuen Hospital, Bang Son railway station, Bang Son MRT station (PP15), Wat Samian Nari Temple, Bon Marché Market, Matichon headquarters, and Dhurakij Pundit University (DPU), along with several restaurants recommended by the Michelin Guide.

The road is also lined with pocket parks. One of these parks served as the venue for the launch of Rosana Tositrakul, an independent candidate for the Bangkok governor's election in 2022, at the end of 2019.

In 2020, the popular night bazaar JJ Green 2 was relocated here from its original location on Kamphaeng Phet 3 Road near Chatuchak and Vachirabenjatas Parks, due to the expiration of the land lease two years earlier.

The Pracha Chuen area was once home to Technology Prachachuen School, a vocational institution established in 1980, originally upgraded from a kindergarten. In 2002, it was converted into a commercial school under the name Varatip Business Technology College (V-Tech).
