= Mueang Pathum Thani district =

Mueang Pathum Thani เมืองปทุมธานี
- District
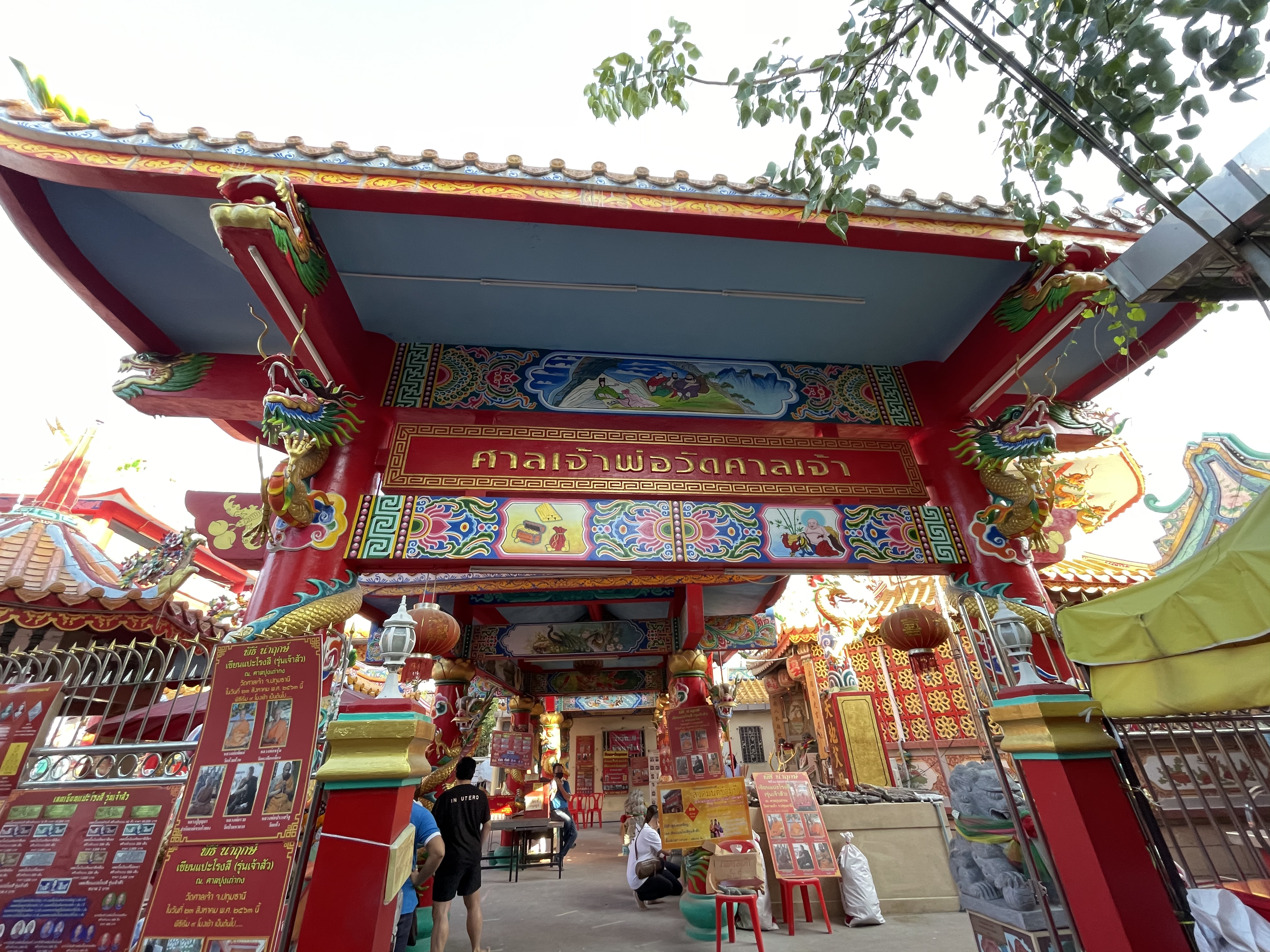
- Wat San Chao, a renowned local temple

- District location in Pathum Thani province
- Coordinates: 14°1′11″N 100°32′6″E
- Country: Thailand
- Province: Pathum Thani
- Seat: Bang Parok

Area
  - Total: 120.151 km^{2} (46.391 sq mi)

Population (2017)
  - Total: 201,126
  - Density: 1,673.94/km^{2} (4,335.5/sq mi)
- Time zone: UTC+7 (ICT)
- Postal code: 12000
- Geocode: 1301

Mueang Pathum Thani (Thai: เมืองปทุมธานี, pronounced [mɯ̄a̯ŋ pā.tʰūm tʰāː.nīː]) is the capital district (amphoe mueang) of Pathum Thani province, central Thailand.

== History ==
In the past, the district was called Bang Kadi District after the name of central tambon, as required by the Law of 1897. The district office was on the east bank of the Chao Phraya River. The office was moved to Tambon Parok, on the west bank of the river, in 1917. On 25 June 1938, the interior ministry changed the name of the district to "Mueang Pathum Thani District" in keeping with a decree of Rama VIII.

== Geography ==
Neighboring districts are (from the west clockwise): Lat Lum Kaeo, Sam Khok, Khlong Luang, Thanyaburi, and Lam Luk Ka of Pathum Thani Province; Don Mueang of Bangkok; and Pak Kret of Nonthaburi province.

== Administration ==
The district is divided into 14 sub-districts (tambons), which are further subdivided into 81 villages (mubans). The town (thesaban mueang) of Pathum Thani covers tambon Bang Prok and two additional municipal areas: the townships (thesaban tambons) Bang Luang and Bang Kadi. Bang Kadi covers the whole same-named tambon, Bang Luang covers parts of tambons Bang Luang, Ban Chang, and Bang Duea. There are twelve tambon administrative organizations (TAO) responsible for the non-municipal areas.

No.	Name	Thai name	Villages	Pop.
1.	Bang Prok	บางปรอก	-	23,713
2.	Ban Mai	บ้านใหม่	6	13,438
3.	Ban Klang	บ้านกลาง	5	12,012
4.	Ban Chang	บ้านฉาง	4	8,892
5.	Ban Krachaeng	บ้านกระแชง	4	3,325
6.	Bang Khayaeng	บางขะแยง	4	14,463
7.	Bang Khu Wat	บางคูวัด	12	26,822
8.	Bang Luang	บางหลวง	7	8,715
9.	Bang Duea	บางเดื่อ	7	14,713
10.	Bang Phut	บางพูด	6	6,345
11.	Bang Phun	บางพูน	6	24,904
12.	Bang Kadi	บางกะดี	5	13,321
13.	Suan Phrik Thai	สวนพริกไทย	8	9,223
14.	Lak Hok	หลักหก	7	21,240

== Education ==
- The Global Indian International School is in Ban Khayaeng.
