= Chiang Rak Noi, Pathum Thani =

Chiang Rak Noi เชียงรากน้อย
- Tambon
- Interactive map of Chiang Rak Noi
- Coordinates: 14°06′30.8″N 100°34′22.0″E
- Country: Thailand
- Province: Pathum Thani
- District: Sam Khok

Government
  - Type: Subdistrict Administrative Organization (SAO)
  - Mayor: Wichian Khumkwian
  - Deputy Mayor: Boonsong Thotsaporn

Area
  - Total: 11.7 km^{2} (4.5 sq mi)

Population (December 2024)
  - Total: 712
  - Density: 60.9/km^{2} (158/sq mi)
- Time zone: UTC+7 (ICT)
- Postcode: 12160
- Area code: (+66) 02
- Website: https://chiengraknoi.go.th/public/

Chiang Rak Noi (Thai: เชียงรากน้อย, pronounced [tɕʰīaŋ raːk̚˥ nɔ́ːj]) is a tambon (subdistrict) in Sam Khok district, upper part of Pathum Thani province.

== History ==
Chiang Rak Noi was originally administered by the local government in the form of a Council Subistrict. Later in 1997, it was upgraded to Subdistrict Administrative Organization (SAO).

== Geography ==
Most of the area is lowland, Chiang Rak Noi lies on the Chao Phraya eastern bank, and has many khlongs (canals) flowing through it. Therefore, most of the population is engaged in agriculture.

Neighbouring subdistricts are (from the north clockwise): Chaing Rak Noi in Bang Sai district, Phra Nakhon Si Ayutthaya; Tha Khlong in Khlong Luang district in its province; Ban Ngio and Ban Pathum with (across Chao Phraya river) Thai Ko in its district.

The subdistrict is 15 km (9.3 mi) from the downtown Sam Khok.

== Climate ==
Rain falls in season and there is a fair amount of water, so there is enough water to use.

== Administration ==
The entire area is under the administration of Subdistrict Administrative Organization Chiang Rak Noi.

It is also divided into five administrative mubans (villages).

No.	Name	Thai
1.	Ban Pak At	บ้านปากอาจ
2.	Ban Sala Daeng	บ้านศาลาแดง
3.	Ban Meta Rang	บ้านเมตารางค์
4.	Ban Sala Pan	บ้านศาลาพัน
5.	Ban Khlong Wat Phlub	บ้านคลองวัดพลับ

The seal of SAO Chiang Rak Noi features an elephant stands on two lotus flowers in a circle frame. The lotus is the symbol of Pathum Thani province. The elephant means the origin of the name Chiang Rak.

== Population ==
As of December 2024, it had a total population of 712 people. Like many tambons in Sam Khok district, the original ethnic group of Chiang Rak Noi is the Mon. Believed that their ancestors migrated here around the time of King Rama II, which was the largest migration of the Mon people. The centre of the Mon is Ban Sala Daeng.
