= Khlong Luang district =

Khlong Luang คลองหลวง
- District
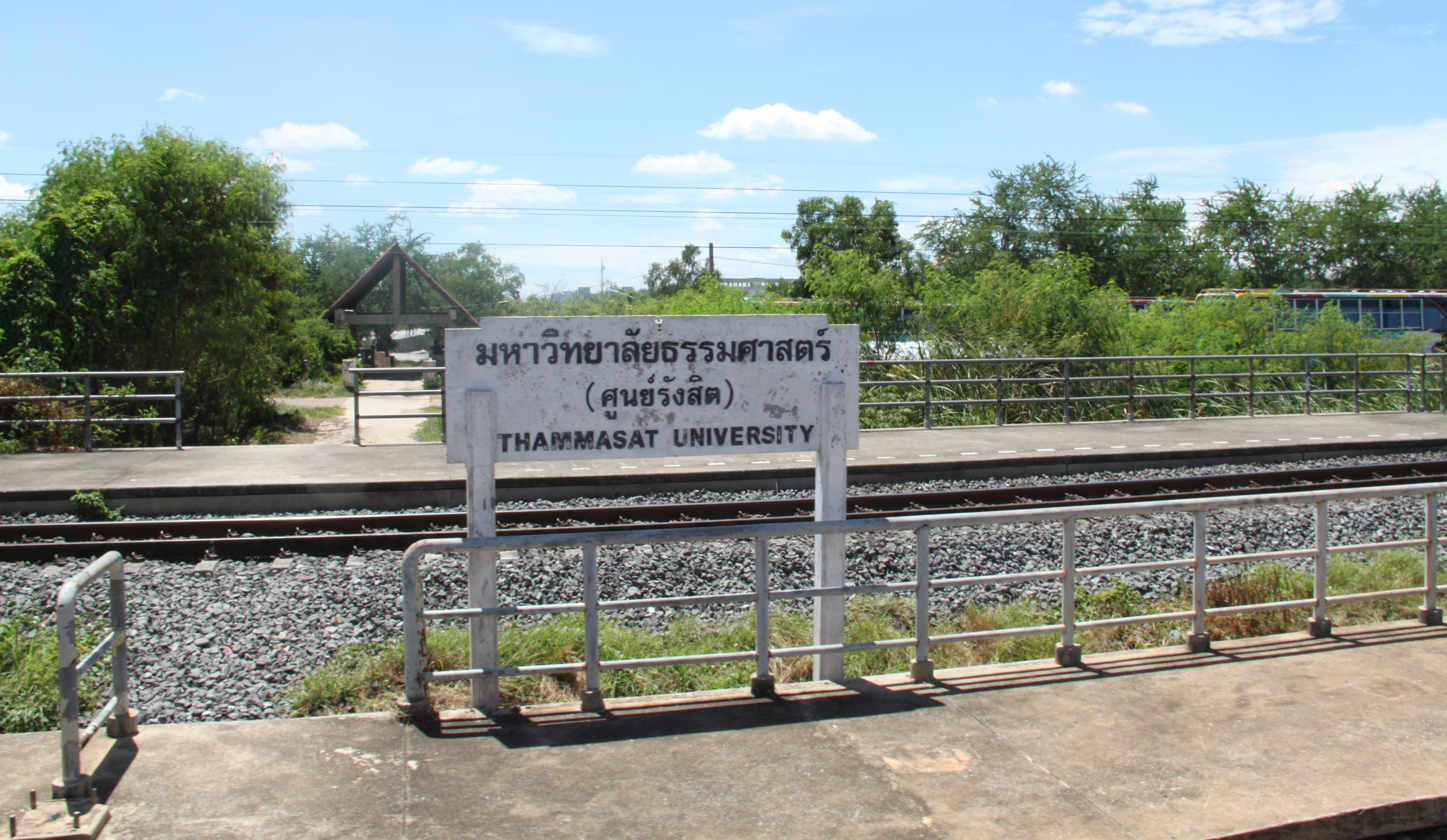
- Thammasat University railway halt is about 800 m (2,624.7 ft) from Thammasat University, Rangsit Campus

- District location in Pathum Thani province
- Coordinates: 14°3′54″N 100°38′46″E
- Country: Thailand
- Province: Pathum Thani
- Seat: Khlong Song
- Subdistricts: 7

Area
  - Total: 299.152 km^{2} (115.503 sq mi)

Population (2017)
  - Total: 274,012
  - Density: 915.96/km^{2} (2,372.3/sq mi)
- Time zone: UTC+7 (ICT)
- Postal code: 12120
- Geocode: 1302

Khlong Luang (Thai: คลองหลวง, pronounced [kʰlɔ̄ːŋ lǔa̯ŋ]) is a district (amphoe) in Pathum Thani province, central Thailand.

== History ==
Originally, the area was part of the Bang Wai District, controlled by Mueang Thanyaburi. In the Ayutthaya era, this area was lowland deep forest. In 1767 when the Ayutthaya Kingdom was destroyed by Burmese troops, some of the survivors moved to this area.

When the community became bigger, people expanded agriculture until it was close to Thung Luang (now Thanyaburi district). King Rama V ordered a canal, Khlong Rangsit, to be built for agricultural purposes for the people in the Thung Luang and Bang Wai area. When the canal was finished, the government changed the name of the district to Khlong Luang to commemorate King Rama V's foresight.

== Geography ==
Neighboring districts are (from the north clockwise): Bang Pa-in and Wang Noi of Phra Nakhon Si Ayutthaya province; Nong Suea, Thanyaburi, Mueang Pathum Thani, and Sam Khok of Pathum Thani Province.

== Administration ==
The district is divided into seven sub-districts (tambons), which are further subdivided into 106 villages (mubans). The Thai names of the tambon simply mean 'Canal One' to 'Canal Seven'. There are two towns (thesaban mueangs), Khlong Luang and Tha Khlong, both incorporating parts of tambons Klong Nueng and Khlong Song. The remaining five tambons are each administered by a tambon administrative organization (TAO).

No.	Name	Thai	Villages
1.	Khlong Nueng	คลองหนึ่ง	20
2.	Khlong Song	คลองสอง	15
3.	Khlong Sam	คลองสาม	16
4.	Khlong Si	คลองสี่	16
5.	Khlong Ha	คลองห้า	16
6.	Khlong Hok	คลองหก	14
7.	Khlong Chet	คลองเจ็ด	9

== Places ==
- Wat Phra Dhammakaya
- Thailand Science Park
- Asian Institute of Technology
- Thammasat University, Rangsit Campus
- Thammasat University Hospital
- Thammasat Stadium
- Bangkok University, Rangsit Campus
- Rajamangala University of Technology Thanyaburi
- Rama IX Museum

== Notable people ==
- Ekkapot Wongnak, former Thai luk thung singer and politician.
