= Sam Khok district =

Sam Khok สามโคก
- District
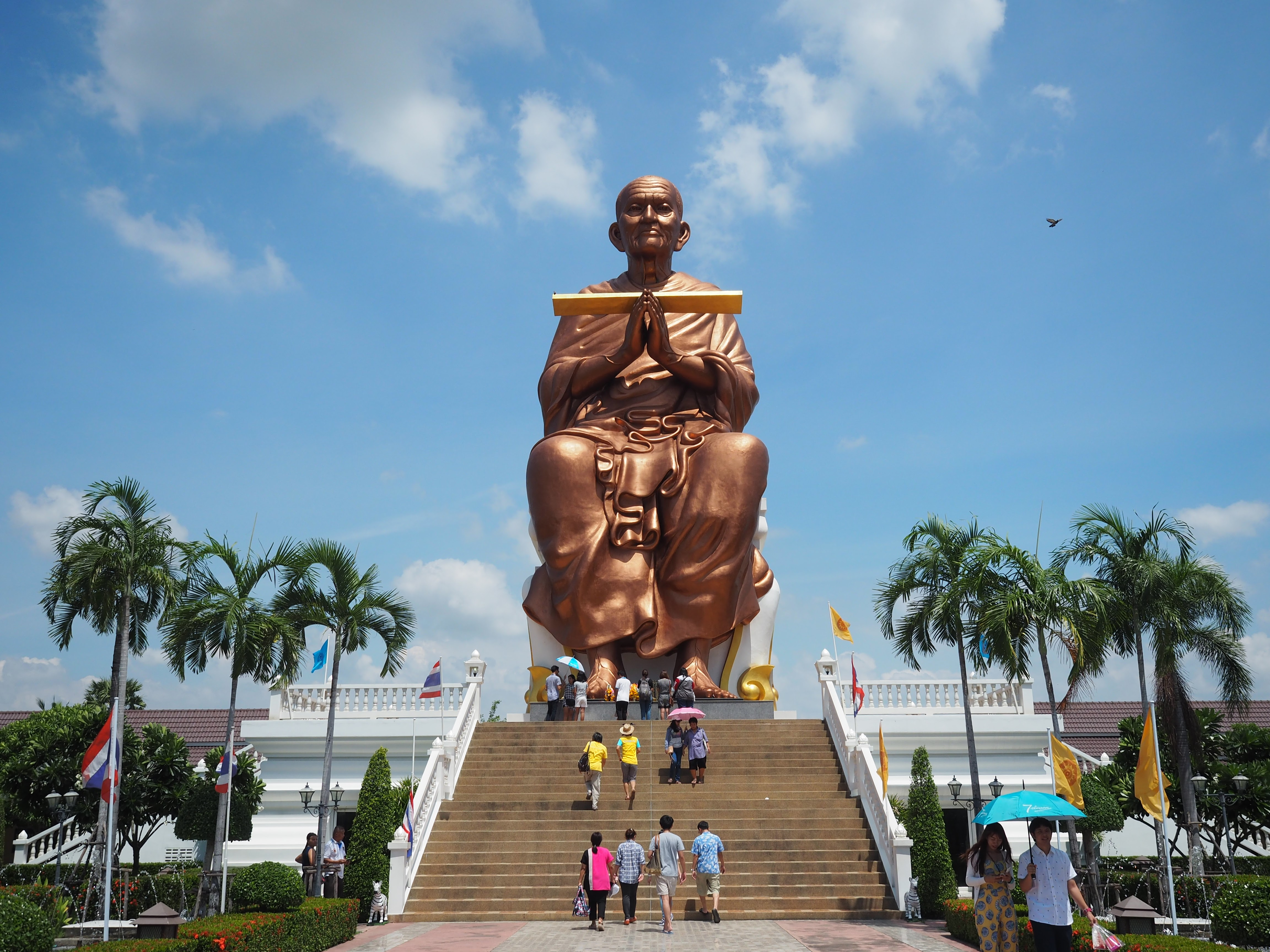
- Statue of Somdej Toh, Wat Bot

- District location in Pathum Thani province
- Coordinates: 14°3′55″N 100°31′21″E
- Country: Thailand
- Province: Pathum Thani
- Seat: Bang Toei

Area
  - Total: 94.967 km^{2} (36.667 sq mi)

Population (2017)
  - Total: 55,082
  - Density: 580.01/km^{2} (1,502.2/sq mi)
- Time zone: UTC+7 (ICT)
- Postal code: 12160
- Geocode: 1307

Sam Khok (Thai: สามโคก, pronounced [sǎːm kʰôːk]) is a district (amphoe) in the northern part of Pathum Thani province, central Thailand, about 50 kilometres north of Bangkok.

== History ==
Mueang Sam Khok is an ancient city, dating to the early-Ayutthaya Kingdom. It was called Thung Phaya Muang before King Uthong established the kingdom in 1350. The first written evidence of its existence—the law on official seals dated 1632—occurs in the reign of King Prasat Thong.

In 1660, a group of Mon people migrated to Ayutthaya because they were oppressed by Burmese rule in their homeland. King Narai the Great provided the area of Mueang Sam Khok for them to establish a new town. Later a further immigration of Mon people to Thailand happened in the reign of King Taksin the Great in 1774 and King Phutthaloetla Naphalai (Rama II) in 1815. Some immigrants settled at Sam Khok, others moved to Pak Kret, Nonthaburi province and Phra Pa Daeng, Samut Prakan province.

In 1726 a book entitled, Oud En Niew Oost-Indien was published in Holland by the Dutch cartographer, De Groote. In it, De Groote's map called "Siamese Rievier Menam" describes Sam Khok as a Potte Bakkers Drop ('pottery-making village'). Sam Khok is still known for its Mon earthenware jars. The name Sam Khok, meaning 'three mounds', refers to the three mounds used to produce jars.

When King Phutthaloetla Naphalai visited Sam Khok in 1815 for the kathin (Buddhist robe ceremony) and rub bua (lotus presentation) the local Mon people gave him many lotus flowers. Impressed by their devotion, the king renamed the city Prathum Thani, meaning 'city of lotus'. At the same time, the king upgraded the city to a third-class city. King Vajiravudh (Rama VI) later renamed the city Pathum Thani, but the meaning is unchanged.

King Chulalongkorn (Rama V) changed the status of the city to Sam Khok District in 1898.

== Geography ==
Neighbouring districts are (from the north clockwise): Lat Bua Luang and Bang Sai of Ayutthaya province; Khlong Luang, Mueang Pathum Thani, and Lat Lum Kaeo of Pathum Thani Province.

The district is crossed by the Chao Phraya River.

== Administration ==
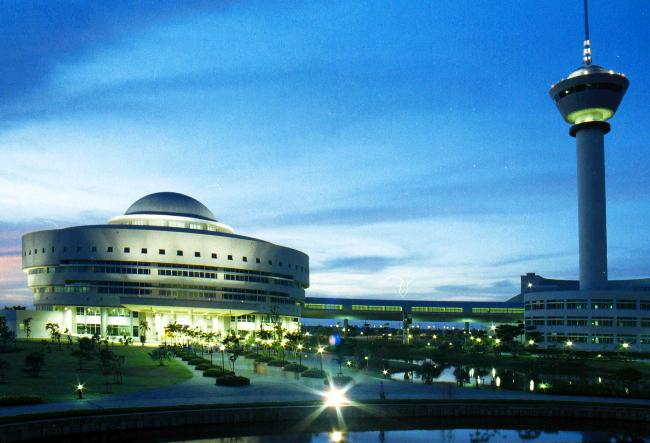
Shinawatra University (SIU)

The district is divided into 11 sub-districts (tambons), which are further subdivided into 58 villages (mubans). Bang Toei has township (thesaban tambon) status and covers part of tambon Bang Toei. Each tambon has a tambon administrative organization (TAO).

1.	Bang Toei	บางเตย	10
2.	Khlong Khwai	คลองควาย	8
3.	Sam Khok	สามโคก	4
4.	Krachaeng	กระแชง	3
5.	Bang Pho Nuea	บางโพธิ์เหนือ	3
6.	Chiang Rak Yai	เชียงรากใหญ่	7
7.	Ban Pathum	บ้านปทุม	6
8.	Ban Ngio	บ้านงิ้ว	5
9.	Chiang Rak Noi	เชียงรากน้อย	5
10.	Bang Krabue	บางกระบือ	3
11.	Thai Ko	ท้ายเกาะ	4

== Places ==
- Shinawatra University (SIU)
- Sam Khok Waterside Market
- Wat Bot

== See also ==
- List of Thai Monarchs
