= Chiang Rak =

Neighbourhood in Thailand

Coordinates: 14°4′5″N 100°32′6″E

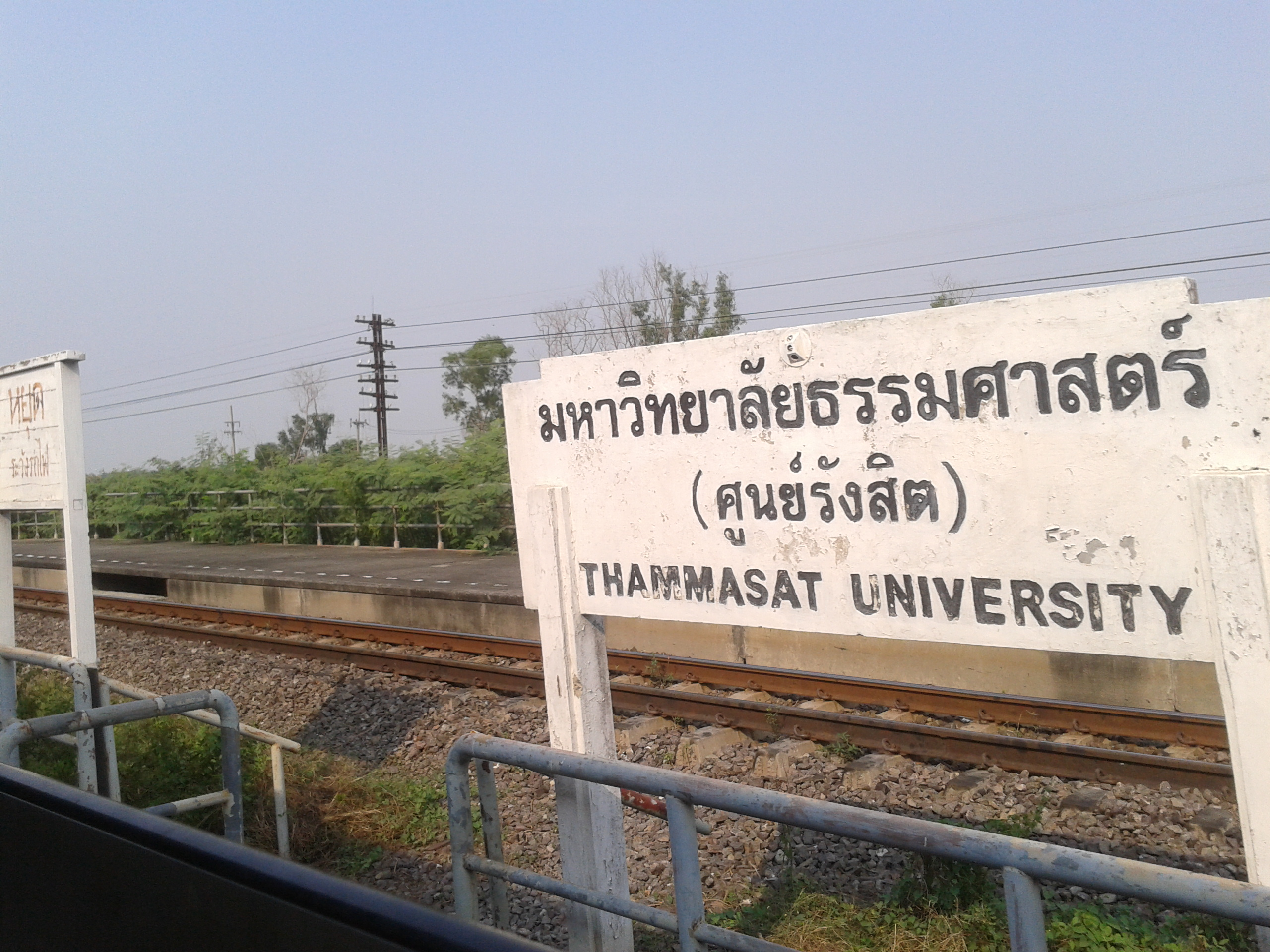
Thammasat University, a railway halt on the northern and northeastern lines nearby to Thammasat University (TU), Rangsit Centre, is in the Chiang Rak area

Chiang Rak (Thai: เชียงราก, pronounced [tɕîaŋ râːk]) is a neighbourhood in the Bangkok Metropolitan Region outskirts that covers from the northern part of Pathum Thani Province to the southern part of Phra Nakhon Si Ayutthaya Province. It can be divided into "Chiang Rak Yai" (เชียงรากใหญ่, "big Chiang Rak") and "Chiang Rak Noi" (เชียงรากน้อย, "little Chiang Rak"). It has also become the administrative district of four tambons (sub-districts) in two amphoes (districts) of two provinces, namely Chiang Rak Yai and Chiang Rak Noi in Sam Khok District, Pathum Thani Province; with Chiang Rak Noi in Bang Pa-in District, and Chiang Rak Noi in Bang Sai District of Phra Nakhon Si Ayutthaya Province.

The name "Chiang Rak" is believed to be derived from the word "Chang Lak" (ช้างลาก, "dragging elephant"), as it is said that hundreds of years ago this area used to be a forest and extensive grassland as well as contain many marshes in the name of "Thung Chiang Rak" (ทุ่งเชียงราก, "Chiang Rak Field"). It was also a habitat to many elephants that walk along the ditches until they form a small canal or waterway. The locals were often referred to as Chang Lak but are more recently known as Chaing Rak. A possible explanation for the origin of the place name comes from the elephants carrying logs passing by. Hence the name Chang Lak and eventually distorted to Chiang Rak.

Originally, the Chao Phraya River that ran through Chiang Rak used to be more winding and hindered navigation than today. In 1608, King Songtham of Ayutthaya ordered the construction of a canal bypassing a loop of the Chao Phraya River to shorten travel time. As time passes the canal became part of the river, and the old course became the new narrow canal known today as Khlong Ban Phrao.

Chiang Rak Bridge, a bridge over the Chao Phraya River and connecting Sam Khok with Bang Sai was built in 1996 and opened in 1998. The bridge can be considered as part of western Kanchanaphisek Road (Outer Ring Road).

At present, Chiang Rak field has a large area of 43,994 rais (17,388 acres), covering an area from the northern part of Pathum Thani up till Sing Buri, Chai Nat, and Nakhon Sawan Provinces. It can be considered as an important rice cultivation site. In addition, during the flood season (after September to December), the field is also used as a site for the large amounts of water that run from the north each year to alleviate flooding.

Historically, on February 23, 1949, just a few days before the Palace Rebellion, Chiang Rak was used as an actual armed manoeuvre by the army until it was big news. It was said that the government wants to intimidate the promoters.

== See also ==
- Rangsit – adjoining area
