= Bang Pa-in district =

Bang Pa-in บางปะอิน
- District
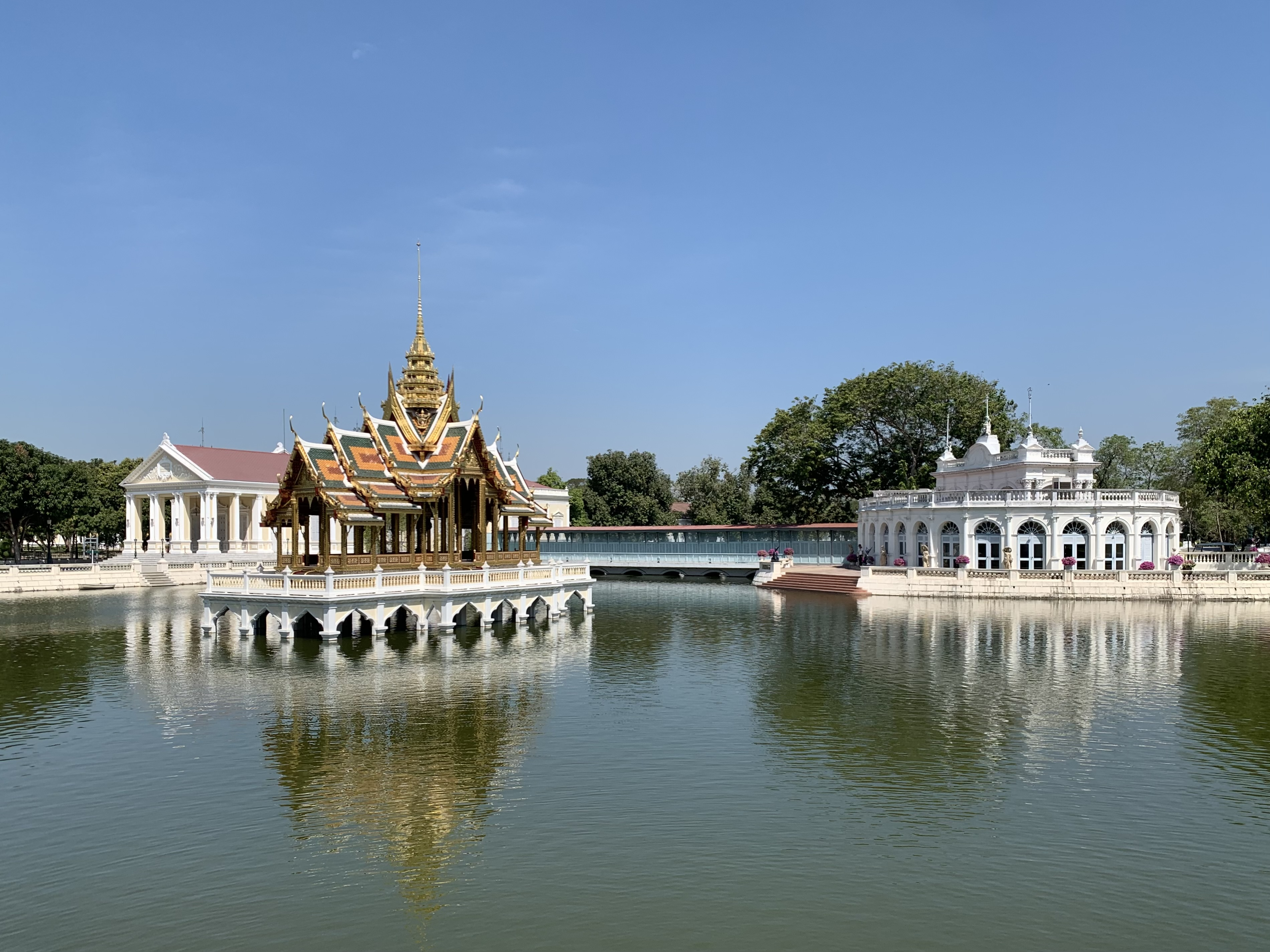
- Bang Pa-In Royal Palace

- District location in Phra Nakhon Si Ayutthaya province
- Coordinates: 14°13′39″N 100°34′32″E
- Country: Thailand
- Province: Ayutthaya
- Tambon: 18
- Muban: 149
- Seat: Ban Len

Area
  - Total: 229.098 km^{2} (88.455 sq mi)

Population (2000)
  - Total: 73,630
  - Density: 321.4/km^{2} (832.4/sq mi)
- Time zone: UTC+7 (ICT)
- Postal code: 13160
- Geocode: 1406

Bang Pa-in (Thai: บางปะอิน, pronounced [bāːŋ pā.ʔīn]) is one of the 16 districts (amphoe) of Phra Nakhon Si Ayutthaya province, central Thailand.

== History ==
Bang Pa-in was established in the Ayutthaya era when it was named Khwaeng Uthai. In the Rattanakosin era Khwaeng Uthai was divided to be Khwaeng Uthai Noi and Uthai Yai. In 1910 Khwaeng Uthai Noi's status was changed and it was renamed Phra Ratchawang District. The district name was changed again to Bang Pa-in after the name of Bang Pa-in island in 1915.

Its name Bang Pa-in is believed to be distorted from Bang Phra In (บางพระอินทร์), literally meaning "place of Indra", refers to place of Inthraracha, the title of Songtham before he became the king. It is believed that he was the son of Ekathotsarot and a local woman named In (อิน) or O In (อออิน).

Bang Pa-in in Ayutthaya era was once called Bang Kradan (บางกระดาน) or Bang Khadan (บางขดาน), which means "place of plain", since it was a spacious plain and a part of Thung Luang Field, a vast field of central region and Chao Phraya basin. It was also used as a place for royal water repellent ceremony during the flood season.

The historic building Bang Pa-in Royal Palace was built during the reign of Prasat Thong, believed to be a cousin to Songtham.

== Geography ==
Neighboring districts are (from the north clockwise) Phra Nakhon Si Ayutthaya, Uthai and Wang Noi of Ayutthaya province, Khlong Luang of Pathum Thani province, and Bang Sai of Ayutthaya.

== Administration ==
The district is divided into 18 sub-districts (tambon), which are further subdivided into 149 villages (muban). There are nine municipal (thesaban) areas, and nine tambon administrative organizations (TAO).

No.	Name	Thai	Villages
1.	Ban Len	บ้านเลน	12
2.	Chiang Rak Noi	เชียงรากน้อย	12
3.	Ban Pho	บ้านโพ	9
4.	Ban Krot	บ้านกรด	11
5.	Bang Krasan	บางกระสั้น	17
6.	Khlong Chik	คลองจิก	8
7.	Ban Wa	บ้านหว้า	7
8.	Wat Yom	วัดยม	8
9.	Bang Pradaeng	บางประแดง	9
10.	Sam Ruean	สามเรือน	8
11.	Ko Koet	เกาะเกิด	7
12.	Ban Phlap	บ้านพลับ	5
13.	Ban Paeng	บ้านแป้ง	4
14.	Khung Lan	คุ้งลาน	5
15.	Taling Chan	ตลิ่งชัน	6
16.	Ban Sang	บ้านสร้าง	8
17.	Talat Kriap	ตลาดเกรียบ	8
18.	Khanon Luang	ขนอนหลวง	5

== See also ==
- Bang Pa-in Royal Palace
