= List of titles and honours of Bhumibol Adulyadej =

The Royal Standard of The King

Bhumibol Adulyadej of Thailand received numerous decorations and honorary appointments as monarch of Thailand. Thai monarchical titles or styles are listed in order of degrees of sovereignty, nobility, and honor:

== Title ==
Styles of King Bhumibol Adulyadej, Rama IX
- Reference style: His Majesty
- Spoken style: Your Majesty

- 5 December 1927 – 9 July 1935: His Highness Prince Bhumibol Adulyadej
- 10 July 1935 – 9 June 1946: His Royal Highness Prince Bhumibol Adulyadej
- 9 June 1946 – 13 October 2016: His Majesty The King

Posthumous title

- 5 May 2019: His Majesty King Bhumibol Adulyadej The Great

== Military Rank ==
- (Thailand) 10 May 1946 - 26 March 1950: First Lieutenant
- (Thailand) 24 March 1950 - 13 October 2016: Admiral of the Fleet
- (Thailand) 26 March 1950 - 13 October 2016: Field Marshal
- (Thailand) 26 March 1950 - 13 October 2016: Marshal of the Royal Thai Air Force

== Designation ==
Designation	Proposer	Date	Reference
Father of Water Resources Management	Royal Thai Cabinet	21 November 1996	
Father of Thai Technology	The National Identity Board by cabinet endorsement	15 Jan 2001	
Father of Royal Rainmaking	Ministry of Agriculture and Cooperatives by cabinet endorsement	21 Oct 2002	
Father of Thai Innovation	Ministry of Science and Technology by cabinet endorsement	27 Jun 2006	
Father of Thai Invention	National Research Council of Thailand, Thai Invention Association, The Chaipattana Foundation, Yacht Racing Association of Thailand under the Royal Patronage, Office of the Permanent Secretary and Office of the Royal Development Project Board by cabinet endorsement	29 Dec 2006	
Father of Thai Heritage Conservation	Thai Heritage Conservation Committee, Fine Art Department, Ministry of Culture by cabinet endorsement	28 Jun 2007	
Father of Thai Research	National Research Council of Thailand by cabinet endorsement	16 Dec 2008	
Father of Thai Craftsmanship Standard	Ministry of Labour by cabinet endorsement	24 Feb 2009	
Father of Thai Rice Research and Development	Royal Thai Cabinet	18 October 2016	

== Honours ==
=== National honours ===
==== Hereditary orders ====
- Sovereign Grand Master of The Most Auspicious Order of the Rajamitrabhorn, 22 November 1962 – 13 October 2016
- The Most Illustrious Order of the Royal House of Chakri
  - Sovereign Grand Master, 9 June 1946 – 13 October 2016
  - Knight, 14 November 1938 – 9 June 1946
- Sovereign Grand Master of The Ancient and Auspicious Order of the Nine Gems, 9 June 1946 – 13 October 2016
- The Most Illustrious Order of Chula Chom Klao
  - Sovereign Grand Master, 9 June 1946 – 13 October 2016
  - Knight Grand Cross (First Class), 20 September 1935 – 9 June 1946
- Sovereign Grand Master of The Honourable Order of Rama, 9 June 1946 – 13 October 2016
- Sovereign Grand Master of The Most Exalted Order of the White Elephant, 9 June 1946 – 13 October 2016
- Sovereign Grand Master of The Most Noble Order of the Crown of Thailand, 9 June 1946 – 13 October 2016
- Sovereign Grand Master of The Most Admirable Order of the Direkgunabhorn, 22 July 1991 – 13 October 2016
- Sovereign Grand Master of The Order of Symbolic Propitiousness Ramkeerati, 26 November 1987 – 13 October 2016

==== Medals for acts of bravery ====
- Grand Master of Bravery Medal, 9 June 1946 – 13 October 2016
- Grand Master of Freeman Safeguarding Medal, 1st Class, 21 February 1969 – 13 October 2016

==== Medals for services to the State ====
- Dushdi Mala Medal Pin of Arts and Science (Military), 9 June 1946 – 13 October 2016
- Border Service Medal, 22 September 1954 – 13 October 2016
- Chakra Mala Medal, 9 June 1946 – 13 October 2016
- Boy Scout Citation Medal of Vajira, First Class, 1964 – 13 October 2016

==== Medals for services to the Monarch ====
- Royal Cypher Medal of Rama VIII, First Class, 14 November 1939 – 13 October 2016

==== Medals for commemorative occasions ====
- King Rama IX Coronation Medal, 1950 – 13 October 2016
- Commemorative Medal on the Occasion of the 150th Years of Rattanakosin Celebration, 1932 – 13 October 2016
- Red Cross Medal of Appreciation, First Class, 1946 – 13 October 2016

=== Foreign honours ===
Coat of arms as knight of the Golden Fleece (Spain)

Coat of arms as knight of the Order of the Elephant (Denmark)

Coat of arms as knight of the Seraphim (Sweden)

Country	Year awarded	Appointment	Ribbon	Reference
Sweden	1950	Knight (incl. Collar) of the Royal Order of the Seraphim		
Cambodia	1954	Grand Cross of the Royal Order of Cambodia		Photo
South Vietnam	1959	Kim Khanh Decoration, First Class		Photo
United Kingdom	1960	Royal Victorian Chain		
West Germany	1960	Grand Cross of the Order of Merit of the Federal Republic of Germany		Photo
(Post-independence Burma (1948–1962)) Burma	1960	The Most Glorious Order of Truth (Thiri Thudhamma Thingaha)		Photo
Argentina	1960	Collar of the Order of the Liberator General San Martín		
United States	1960	Chief Commander of the Legion of Merit		Photo
Portugal	1960	Sash of the Three Orders		Photo
Denmark	1960	Knight of the Order of the Elephant		Photo
Norway	1960	Grand Cross with Collar of the Royal Norwegian Order of Saint Olav		
Italy	1960	Knight Grand Cross with Collar of the Order of Merit of the Italian Republic		
Holy See	1960	Knight with the Collar of the Order of Pius IX		Photo
Belgium	1960	Grand Cordon of the Order of Leopold		Photo
France	1960	Grand Cross of the Legion of Honour		Photo
Luxembourg	1960	Knight of the Order of the Gold Lion of the House of Nassau		
Netherlands	1960	Knight Grand Cross of the Order of the Netherlands Lion		Photo
Spain	1960	Knight of the Collar of the Order of Civil Merit		
Spain	1960	Knight of the Collar of the Order of Isabella the Catholic		Photo
Indonesia	1961	First Class (Adipurna) of the Star of the Republic of Indonesia		
Brazil	1961	Grand Collar of the Order of the Southern Cross		
Pakistan	1962	Nishan-e-Pakistan		Photo
(Malaysia) Malaya	1962	Honorary Recipient of the Most Exalted Order of the Crown of the Realm		
Japan	1963	Collar of the Supreme Order of the Chrysanthemum		Photo
(Taiwan) Republic of China	1963	Grand Cordon of the Order of Brilliant Jade		
(Kingdom of Greece) Greece	1963	Knight Grand Cross of the Order of the Redeemer		
(Kingdom of Laos) Laos	1963	Grand Cordon of the Order of the Million Elephants and the White Parasol		Photo
(Kingdom of Laos) Laos	1963	Grand Cross of the Order of the Crown of Laos		Photo
Philippines	1963	Grand Collar of the Order of Sikatuna		
Austria	1964	Grand Star of the Decoration of Honour for Services to the Republic of Austria		
South Korea	1966	Grand Order of Mugunghwa		
Iran	1967	Collar of the Order of Pahlavi		Photo
(Ethiopian Empire) Ethiopia	1968	Collar of the Order of the Queen of Sheba		
Philippines	1968	Chief Commander of the Philippine Legion of Honor		Photo
Indonesia	1970	Army Meritorious Service Star, 1st Class		
Mexico	1971	Collar of the Order of the Aztec Eagle		
(Socialist Federal Republic of Yugoslavia) SFR Yugoslavia	1980	Order of the Yugoslav Star		
South Korea	1981	Order of Merit for National Foundation		Photo
Chile	1981	Grand Collar of the Order of Merit		
Egypt	1982	Grand Collar of the Order of the Nile		
Nepal	1986	The Nepal Pratap Bhaskara		
Spain	1987	Knight of the Collar of the Order of Charles III		
Brunei	1988	Member of the Royal Family Order of the Crown of Brunei		
Venezuela	1990	Grand Collar of the Order of the Liberator		
Laos	1992	Order of Phoxay Lane Xang		
Czech Republic	1994	Grand Collar of the Order of the White Lion		
South Africa	1995	Grand Cross of the Order of Good Hope		
Peru	1996	Grand Cross with Diamonds of the Order of the Sun of Peru		
Finland	1996	Commander Grand Cross of the Order of the White Rose of Finland		
Portugal	1999	Grand Collar of the Order of Prince Henry		
Romania	2000	Collar of the Order of the Star of Romania		
Bulgaria	2001	Grand Cross of the Order of the Balkan Mountains		
Guatemala	2002	Grand Cross of the Order of the Quetzal		
Jordan	2004	Grand Cordon with Collar of the Order of Al-Hussein bin Ali		
Ukraine	2004	First Class of the Order of Prince Yaroslav the Wise		
Spain	2006	Knight of the Order of the Golden Fleece		
Hungary	2009	Grand Cross with Chain of the Hungarian Order of Merit		

==== Orders of the Sultanates of Malaysia ====
Sultanate	Year awarded	Appointment	Ribbon	Reference
Selangor	1999	First Class of The Most Esteemed Royal Family Order of Selangor		
Terengganu	2009	Member of The Most Distinguished Royal Family Order of Terengganu		

== Wear of orders, decorations, and medals ==
The ribbons worn regularly by Bhumibol Adulyadej in undress uniform are as follows:

Ribbon bars of the Bhumibol Adulyadej

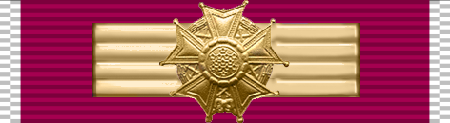

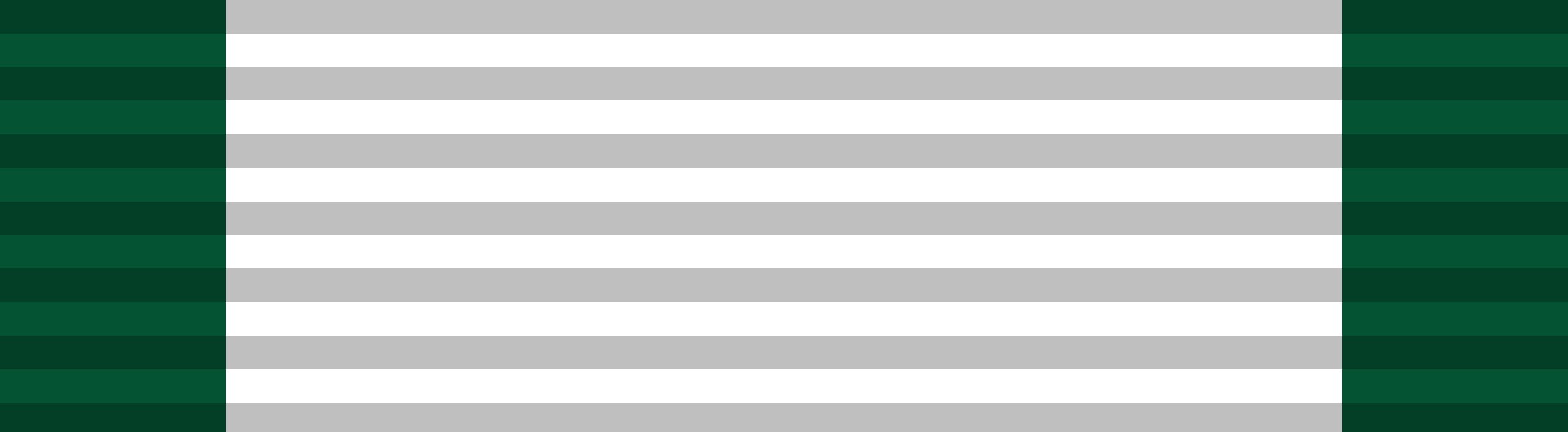

== Awards ==
Country	Date awarded	Institute	Appointment	Reference
EU	19 Jul 1975	European Parliament	Special Medal of the European Parliament	
South Korea	8 Sep 1986	International Association of University Presidents	IAUP Peace Award	
Thailand	21 Jul 1987	Asian Institute of Technology	Gold Medal award for His Majesty's outstanding leadership in rural development	
US	29 Oct 1987	Office of Strategic Services	William J. Donovan Medal	
IOC	14 Dec 1987	International Olympic Committee	Honorary Olympic Gold Medal	
UK	3 Oct 1988	Royal College of Surgeons of England	Gold Medal to commemorate the occasion of the Joint Academic Meeting between the Royal College of Surgeons of Thailand and Royal College of Surgeons of England	
US	17 Aug 1990	Rotary International	Rotary International Award	
UN	2 Dec 1990	UNESCO	Philae Medal	
UN	4 Nov 1992	United Nations Environment Programme	UNEP Gold Medal of Distinction	
UN	24 Nov 1992	World Health Organization	Health-for-All Gold Medal	
US	26 Jan 1993	International Society of Chemical Ecology	Natura Pro Futura Medal for the conservation of biodiversity	
US	25 Feb 1993	International Erosion Control Association	International Merit Award	
US	30 Oct 1993	World Bank	Award of Recognition of technical and development accomplishment in the promotion of the vetiver technology international	
UN	12 Dec 1994	United Nations International Drug Control Programme	Award of appreciation, in recognition of His Majesty's outstanding contributions to drug control efforts in Thailand	
UN	6 Dec 1995	FAO	Agricola Medal	
Philippine	5 June 1996	International Rice Research Institute	International Rice Award Medal	
US	24 Oct 1996	Rotary International	Presidential Citation for Humanitarian Service	
US	13 Nov 1996	American College of Chest Physicians	The Partnering for World Health	
UN	18 Jan 1997	World Meteorological Organization	Award of recognition of His Majesty's strong support for meteorology and operational hydrology	
Canada	25 Jun 1997	Council for the Control of Iodine Deficiency Disorders	ICCIDD Gold Medal	
ASEAN	8 Jul 1997	Organizing Committee of S.E.A. Write Awards	Plaque of Honour	
France	24 Nov 1998	International Union Against Tuberculosis and Lung Disease	Gold Medal Award	
US	3 Mar 1999	Lions Clubs International	Lions Humanitarian Award	
UN	8 Dec 1999	FAO	TeleFood Medal	
US	18 Jan 2000	Yale School of Music	Sanford Medal	
IOC	19 Jan 2000	International Olympic Committee	Lalaounis Cup	
UN	31 May 2000	World Health Organization	WHO Plaque	
Belgium	5 Jun 2000	Belgian Chamber of Investors	Merite de l'Invention Medal	
US	2 Nov 2000	University of California, Berkeley	The Berkeley Medal	
Belgium	16 Feb 2001	EUREKA	World Outstanding Awards (Prix OMPI, Gold Medal with Mention, Grand Prix International Cup, Minister J. Chabert Cup, and Yugoslavia Cup) at Eureka 2000: 49th World Exhibition of Innovation, Research and New Technology	
Mexico	26 Nov 2001	World Boxing Council	Golden Shining Symbol of World Leadership in recognition of His Majesty's outstanding support for Thai boxing and all sports in Thailand	
Belgium	27 Mar 2002	EUREKA	World Outstanding Invention Awards (D'un concept nouveau de development de la Thailand, Special PRIX Cup, and 3 Gold medals with mention)	
UN	25 Feb 2004	United Nations Human Settlements Programme	UN HABITAT scroll of Honour Award (Special Citation)	
Thailand	23 May 2006	Asia-Pacific Rural and Agricultural, Credit Association	Golden Ear of Paddy, commemorating the outstanding leadership in Rural Development	
UN	26 May 2006	United Nations Development Programme	UNDP Human Development Lifetime Achievement Award	
WOSM	20 Jun 2006	World Organization of the Scout Movement	Bronze Wolf Award	
Hong Kong	29 Nov 2006	TIME Asia	TIME Asian Hero King Bhumibol Adulyadej for Shaping the Asia of Our Times	
UAE	16 May 2007	Government of the United Arab Emirates and the World Meteorological Organization	UAE Prize for Weather Modification	
US	23 Jul 2007	The World Food Prize Foundation	The Norman E. Borlaug Medallion	
Hungary	12 Nov 2007	International Federation of Inventors' Associations	IFIA Cub 2007 for His Majesty's Chaipattana Low Speed Aerator IFIA Genius Medal for His Majesty's "New Theory" for farmers and his Sufficiency Economy Philosophy	
South Korea	12 Nov 2007	Korea Invention Promotion Association	IKIPA Special Prize with certificate	
ASEAN	9 Dec 2007	Southeast Asian Games Federation	SEA Games Federation Merit Award	
UN	14 Jan 2009	World Intellectual Property Organization	WIPO Global Leaders Award	
	16 Apr 2012	International Union of Soil Sciences	IUSS Humanitarian Soil Scientist Medal	
IOC	3 Nov 2012	Badminton World Federation	The President's Medal	

== Memberships ==
Country	Appointed Date	Institute	Type	Reference
Thailand	26 Jan 1952	The Thai Bar Under the Royal Patronage	Honorary Fellowship	
Austria	5 Oct 1964	The Academy for Music and Performing Arts in Vienna	Honorary Fellowship	
UK	16 Oct 1984	Royal College of Surgeons of England	Honorary Fellowship	
Thailand	8 May 1987	Royal College of Physicians of Thailand	Honorary Fellowship	
UK	24 Jul 1990	Royal Photographic Society	Honorary Fellowship	
Switzerland	12 Nov 1991	Fédération Internationale de l'Art Photographique	Honorary Fellowship	
Australia	29 Apr 1996	Royal Australasian College of Physicians	Honorary Fellowship	
UK	4 Oct 2000	Institution of Civil Engineers	Honorary Fellowship	
UK	9 Jul 2001	Royal College of Surgeons of Edinburgh	Honorary Fellowship	
UK	24 Aug 2006	Royal Yachting Association	Honorary Member	
Thailand	8 May 2006	Royal College of Dental Surgeons of Thailand	Honorary Fellowship	
UK	3 Aug 2007	Liverpool John Moores University	Honorary Fellowship	
Switzerland	21 Apr 2009	Confrérie du Guillon	Honorary Fellowship	
Thailand	15 Jul 2011	Royal College of Surgeons of Thailand	Honorary Fellowship	
US	15 Jul 2011	American College of Surgeons	Honorary Fellowship	
UK	15 Jul 2011	Royal College of Surgeons of Edinburgh	Honorary Fellowship	
Australia	15 Jul 2011	Royal Australasian College of Surgeons	Honorary Fellowship	

== Honorary doctorates ==
In 1997 the king captured the world record for the most honorary degrees—136—held by anyone.

=== Thai academic ===
Awarded Date	Institute	Award	Reference
21 May 1950	Chulalongkorn University	Honorary doctorate of political science	
29 May 1950	Thammasat University	Honorary doctorate of political science	
9 Jul 1953	Kasetsart University	Honorary doctorate of agricultural science	
29 Dec 1959	Srinakharinwirot University	Honorary doctorate of education in educational administration	
6 Apr 1960	Mahidol University	Honorary doctorate of public health	
21 Oct 1965	Silpakorn University	Honorary doctorate of fine arts in painting	
16 Dec 1968	Khon Kaen University	Honorary doctorate of engineering	
16 Jan 1969	Chiang Mai University	Honorary doctorate of arts in political science	
19 Nov 1970	National Institute of development administration	Honorary doctorate of public administration	
31 Aug 1972	Prince of Songkla University	Honorary doctorate of engineering in mechanical engineering	
18 Oct 1972	King Mongkut's Institute of Technology; Former Name of KMITL, KMUTNB, and KMUTT	Honorary doctorate of engineering	
26 Nov 1975	Ramkhamhaeng University	Honorary doctorate of laws	
17 Jul 1978	Kasetsart University	Honorary doctorate of engineering in irrigation engineering	
5 Feb 1981	Maejo University	Honorary doctorate of agricultural technology	
5 Aug 1982	Thammasat University	Honorary doctorate of economics	
13 Jun 1983	Kasetsart University	Honorary doctorate of science in cooperative economics	
26 Mar 1984	Sukhothai Thammathirat Open University	Honorary doctorate of agricultural extension and cooperatives	
11 Apr 1984	Ramkhamhaeng University	Honorary doctorate of philosophy in political science	
11 Jul 1985	Mahidol University	Honorary doctorate of science in nutrition	
5 Sep 1985	Chulalongkorn University	Honorary doctorate of engineering	
10 Jul 1986	Chulalongkorn University	Honorary doctorate of fine arts	
18 Oct 1986	King Mongkut's Institute of Technology Ladkrabang	Honorary doctorate of science in biotechnology	
11 Dec 1986	Silpakorn University	Honorary doctorate of arts in anthropology	
2 Jul 1987	Mahidol University	Honorary doctorate of medicine	
16 Jul 1987	Chulalongkorn University	Honorary doctorate of laws	
22 Jun 1987	Kasetsart University	Honorary doctorate of arts in music	
14 Sep 1987	Srinakharinwirot University	Honorary doctorate of medicine	
24 Dec 1987	Khon Kaen University	Honorary doctorate of arts in development science	
5 Jan 1988	Ramkhamhaeng University	Honorary doctorate of philosophy in economics	
23 Jan 1988	Chiang Mai University	Honorary doctorate of engineering	
30 Jun 1988	Mahidol University	Honorary doctorate of science in technology of environmental management	
20 Jul 1988	Thammasat University	Honorary doctorate of arts in journalism	
20 Jul 1988	Thammasat University	Honorary doctorate of science in environmental science	
31 Jul 1988	Chulalongkorn University	Honorary doctorate of philosophy program in urban and environmental	
18 Oct 1988	King Mongkut's Institute of Technology Ladkrabang	Honorary doctorate of engineering in telecommunications engineering	
18 Oct 1988	King Mongkut's Institute of Technology Ladkrabang	Honorary doctorate of philosophy program in urban and environmental	
22 Dec 1988	Khon Kaen University	Honorary doctorate of dentistry	
29 Dec 1988	Srinakharinwirot University	Honorary doctorate of science in geography	
18 Jan 1989	Sukhothai Thammathirat Open University	Honorary doctorate of political science	
24 Jan 1989	Chiang Mai University	Honorary doctorate of science in agricultural science	
1 April 1989	National Institute of development administration	Honorary doctorate of philosophy in economic development	
25 May 1989	Chulalongkorn University	Honorary doctorate of education	
26 Oct 1989	Silpakorn University	Honorary doctorate of architecture	
30 April 1990	Kasetsart University	Honorary doctorate of science in agricultural and resource economics	
15 Oct 1990	King Mongkut's University of Technology Thonburi	Honorary doctorate of engineering in environmental technology	
1 Aug 1991	Chulalongkorn University	Honorary doctorate of dentistry	
16 Jul 1991	Mahidol University	Honorary doctorate of science in sport science	
29 Oct 1991	King Mongkut's University of Technology North Bangkok	Honorary doctorate of engineering	
25 Dec 1991	Burapha University	Honorary doctorate of science in aquatic science	
1 April 1991	National Institute of development administration	Honorary doctorate of philosophy in applied statistics	
2 Jan 1992	Naresuan University	Honorary doctorate of science in biology	
8 Jun 1992	Ubon Ratchathani University	Honorary doctorate of science in agricultural science	
2 Jul 1992	Mahidol University	Honorary doctorate of science in computer science	
1 Jul 1993	Mahidol University	Honorary doctorate of arts in cultural studies (cultural music)	
8 Jul 1993	Chulalongkorn University	Honorary doctorate of communication arts	
19 Jul 1993	Silpakorn University	Honorary doctorate of science in environmental science	
29 Jul 1993	Thammasat University	Honorary doctorate of arts in sociology and anthropology	
3 Jun 1994	Mahidol University	Honorary doctorate of engineering	
12 Jul 1994	Chulalongkorn University	Honorary doctorate of science	
27 Jul 1994	Thammasat University	Honorary doctorate of science in rural technology	
13 Dec 1994	Srinakharinwirot University	Honorary doctorate of arts in fine arts	
18 Jan 1995	Sukhothai Thammathirat Open University	Honorary doctorate of public health	
23 Feb 1995	Maejo University	Honorary doctorate of arts in rural development planning	
17 Jul 1995	Mahidol University	Honorary doctorate of dentistry	
31 Jul 1995	Thammasat University	Honorary doctorate of social work	
18 Oct 1995	King Mongkut's University of Technology North Bangkok	Honorary doctorate of science in industrial education in mechanics	
18 Oct 1995	King Mongkut's Institute of Technology Ladkrabang	Honorary doctorate of science in soil science	
24 Nov 1995	Burapha University	Honorary doctorate of arts in community development	
11 Nov 1995	Mahasarakham University	Honorary doctorate of science in environmental technology	
14 Dec 1995	Srinakharinwirot University	Honorary doctorate of engineering	
25 Dec 1995	Khon Kaen University	Honorary doctorate of arts in Thai	
17 Jan 1996	Sukhothai Thammathirat Open University	Honorary doctorate of communication arts	
24 Jan 1996	Chiang Mai University	Honorary doctorate of engineering in environmental engineering	
13 May 1996	Kasetsart University	Honorary doctorate of science in agricultural extension	
7 Oct 1996	Prince of Songkla University	Honorary doctorate of science	
16 Dec 1996	Burapha University	Honorary doctorate of science in geography	
19 Dec 1996	Khon Kaen University	Honorary doctorate of science in environmental ecology	
1 Feb 1997	Rajabhat University	Honorary doctorate of science in computer science	
3 Jul 1997	Mahidol University	Honorary doctorate of science in physics	
4 Jul 1997	Mahidol University	Honorary doctorate of dentistry	
31 Jul 1997	Thammasat University	Honorary doctorate of business administration	
24 Oct 1997	Suranaree University of Technology	Honorary doctorate of engineering in civil engineering	
17 Dec 1997	Srinakharinwirot University	Honorary doctorate of science in physical education	
18 Dec 1997	Khon Kaen University	Honorary doctorate of science in agricultural science	
9 Feb 1998	Kasetsart University	Honorary doctorate of science in rorestry	
9 Feb 1998	Kasetsart University	Honorary doctorate of science in agro-industry	
17 Dec 1998	Khon Kaen University	Honorary doctorate of arts in development administration	
20 Jan 1999	Chiang Mai University	Honorary doctorate of dentistry	
19 Jul 1999	Kasetsart University	Honorary doctorate of science in soil science	
19 Jul 1999	Kasetsart University	Honorary doctorate of science in horticulture	
19 Jul 1999	Kasetsart University	Honorary doctorate of science in fisheries science	
19 Jul 1999	Kasetsart University	Honorary doctorate of science in biological science	
19 Jul 1999	Kasetsart University	Honorary doctorate of science in economic botany	
19 Jul 1999	Kasetsart University	Honorary doctorate of science in resources management	
19 Jul 1999	Kasetsart University	Honorary doctorate of arts in applied linguistics	
19 Jul 1999	Kasetsart University	Honorary doctorate of arts in social development	
19 Jul 1999	Kasetsart University	Honorary doctorate of arts in political science	
19 Jul 1999	Kasetsart University	Honorary doctorate of education in education administration	
19 Jul 1999	Kasetsart University	Honorary doctorate of business administration	
8 Oct 1999	Chulalongkorn University	Honorary doctorate of science	
8 Oct 1999	Chulalongkorn University	Honorary doctorate of arts	
28 Oct 1999	Thammasat University	Honorary doctorate of laws	
7 Dec 1999	Burapha University	Honorary doctorate of public health	
22 Dec 1999	Khon Kaen University	Honorary doctorate of economics	
24 Dec 1999	Srinakharinwirot University	Honorary doctorate of engineering	
26 Jul 1999	Mahasarakham University	Honorary doctorate of arts in Thai	
1999	National Institute of development administration	Honorary doctorate of philosophy in environmental management	
1999	Naresuan University	Honorary doctorate of science in natural resources and environmental management	
24 Jan 2000	Chiang Mai University	Honorary doctorate of economics	
28 Jul 2000	Thammasat University	Honorary doctorate of science in community development	
4 Nov 2000	King Mongkut's University of Technology Thonburi	Honorary doctorate of philosophy in energy technology	
25 Dec 2000	Srinakharinwirot University	Honorary doctorate of science in food science and nutrition	
5 Jan 2001	Khon Kaen University	Honorary doctorate of fine and applied arts in Western music	
28 May 2001	Kasetsart University	Honorary doctorate of science in agricultural economics	
26 Jul 2001	Thammasat University	Honorary doctorate of dentistry	
4 Aug 2001	Srinakharinwirot University	Honorary doctorate of dentistry	
18 Oct 2001	King Mongkut's University of Technology North Bangkok	Honorary doctorate of engineering in automotive engineering technology	
20 Sep 2001	Mahasarakham University	Honorary doctorate of engineering in rural engineering	
29 Sep 2003	Burapha University	Honorary doctorate of science in nautical science	
1 Dec 2003	Naresuan University	Honorary doctorate of dentistry	
2003	National Institute of development administration	Honorary doctorate of philosophy in human resources development	
2003	Walailak University	Honorary doctorate of philosophy in technology for resource management	
19 Sep 2003	Mahasarakham University	Honorary doctorate of arts in visual arts	
2003	Naresuan University	Honorary doctorate of dentistry	
14 Oct 2004	Prince of Songkla University	Honorary doctorate of public administration	
21 Feb 2005	Suranaree University of technology	Honorary doctorate of science in animal production technology	
27 Jul 2005	Kasetsart University	Honorary doctorate of engineering in water resources engineering	
2005	Silpakorn University	Honorary doctorate of architecture in Thai architecture	
8 Dec 2005	King Mongkut's University of Technology North Bangkok	Honorary doctorate of engineering in telecommunication	
22 Dec 2005	Khon Kaen University	Honorary doctorate of arts in philosophy	
30 Dec 2005	Srinakharinwirot University	Honorary doctorate of education in development education	
9 Jan 2006	Ramkhamhaeng University	Honorary doctorate of philosophy in public administration	
26 Jan 2006	Sukhothai Thammathirat Open University	Honorary doctorate of science	
6 Jul 2006	Mahidol University	Honorary doctorate of arts in rural development studies	
16 Sep 2006	Ubon Ratchathani University	Honorary doctorate of engineering in mechanical engineering	
21 Sep 2006	Prince of Songkla University	Honorary doctorate of science in agricultural science	
6 Oct 2006	Mahasarakham University	Honorary doctorate of philosophy in economics	
16 Oct 2006	Suranaree University of technology	Honorary doctorate of information science in communications technology	
13 Nov 2006	King Mongkut's University of Technology North Bangkok	Honorary doctorate of philosophy in technology	
27 Dec 2006	Burapha University	Honorary doctorate of philosophy in education and social development	
2006	Naresuan University	Honorary doctorate of science in physics	
2006	Naresuan University	Honorary doctorate of science in geography	
2006	Chiang Mai University	Honorary doctorate of business administration	
2006	Chiang Mai University	Honorary doctorate of accountancy	
2006	Chiang Mai University	Honorary doctorate of laws	
2006	Chiang Mai University	Honorary doctorate of philosophy in nursing	
2006	Chiang Mai University	Honorary doctorate of medicine	
2006	Chiang Mai University	Honorary doctorate of pharmacy	
2006	Chiang Mai University	Honorary doctorate of public administration	
2006	Chiang Mai University	Honorary doctorate of science	
2006	Chiang Mai University	Honorary doctorate of fine arts	
2006	Chiang Mai University	Honorary doctorate of arts	
2006	Chiang Mai University	Honorary doctorate of education	
2006	Chiang Mai University	Honorary doctorate of architecture	
2006	Chiang Mai University	Honorary doctorate of veterinary medicine	
2006	Chiang Mai University	Honorary doctorate of public health	
5 Feb 2007	Thaksin University	Honorary doctorate of economics	
19 Feb 2007	Maejo University	Honorary doctorate of science geosocial-based sustainable development	
24 Jul 2007	Kasetsart University	Honorary doctorate of philosophy in environmental science	
24 Jul 2007	Kasetsart University	Honorary doctorate of engineering in agricultural engineering	
5 Oct 2007	Srinakharinwirot University	Honorary doctorate of arts in philosophy and religion	
22 Oct 2007	Suranaree University of technology	Honorary doctorate of science in sport science	
18 Dec 2007	Khon Kaen University	Honorary doctorate of veterinary medicine	
2007	Burapha University	Honorary doctorate of economics	
2007	Mahasarakham University	Honorary doctorate of fine arts in music	
21 April 2008	Chiang Rai Rajabhat University	Honorary doctorate of philosophy in ethnic studies	
21 Sep 2008	Prince of Songkla University	Honorary doctorate of engineering in chemical engineering	
2008	Thaksin University	Honorary doctorate of philosophy in Western music	
2008	National Institute of development administration	Honorary doctorate of philosophy in development administration	
2009	Silpakorn University	Honorary doctorate of arts in cultural resource management	
2009	National Institute of development administration	Honorary doctorate of philosophy in social development and environmental management	
14 Dec 2009	Srinakharinwirot University	Honorary doctorate of arts in geosocial-based management	
6 Jan 2010	National Institute of development administration	Honorary doctorate of philosophy in technology management	
13 Aug 2010	Thammasat University	Honorary doctorate of engineering in civil engineering	
13 Sep 2010	Prince of Songkla University	Honorary doctorate of arts in social development	
10 Jan 2011	Thaksin University	Honorary doctorate of philosophy in geography	
28 Feb 2011	Ramkhamhaeng University	Honorary doctorate of philosophy in education	
21 Sep 2011	Prince of Songkla University	Honorary doctorate of engineering in civil engineering	
21 Dec 2011	Mahasarakham University	Honorary doctorate of education	
29 Jan 2011	Rattana Bundit University	Honorary doctorate of business administration	
5 Oct 2012	King Mongkut's Institute of Technology Ladkrabang	Honorary doctorate of philosophy in environmental chemistry	
5 Oct 2012	King Mongkut's Institute of Technology Ladkrabang	Honorary doctorate of philosophy in agricultural communication	
5 Oct 2012	King Mongkut's Institute of Technology Ladkrabang	Honorary doctorate of arts in photography	

=== Foreign academic ===
In August 1962 the Australian National University refused to award the king an honorary doctorate on the grounds that he had not completed his degree at the University of Lausanne. The refusal prompted a minor diplomatic row between the university and the Thai government.

Country	Award date	Institute	Award	Reference
South Vietnam	19 Dec 1959	University of Saigon	Doctor of laws, honoris causa	
Indonesia	12 Feb 1960	Gadjah Mada University	Doctor honoris causa	
Pakistan	15 Mar 1962	University of Peshawar	Honorary doctor of laws	
Australia	3 Sep 1962	University of Melbourne	Doctor of laws, honoris causa	
Philippines	13 Jul 1963	University of the Philippines	Doctor of laws, honoris causa	
US	11 Jun 1967	Williams College	Honorary doctor of laws	
Thailand	7 May 1975	Asian Institute of technology	Honorary doctor of engineering	
US	10 Aug 1979	Pepperdine University	The distinguished diploma of honor	
US	2 Jan 1985	Tufts University	Doctor of laws, honoris causa	
US	7 Jan 1986	University of Hawaii	Doctor of Humanities, honoris causa	
Australia	21 Nov 1996	University of Canberra	Honorary doctorate of the university for sustained and dedicated services to education	
UK	15 May 1997	University of Nottingham	Doctor of laws (LLD), honoris causa	
Australia	19 Nov 1998	Griffith University	Doctor of the university	
Canada	5 Nov 1999	University of Victoria	Doctor of science, honoris causa	
US	15 Mar 2000	Ohio University	Doctor of laws, honoris causa	
Costa Rica	7 Dec 2000	University for Peace	Doctor of International laws, honoris causa	
Thailand	24 Jan 2001	Asian Institute of technology	Honorary doctor of science	
New Zealand	11 Sep 2002	Massey University	Honorary doctor of science	
Australia	20 Nov 2002	University of Tasmania	Honorary doctor of science (DSc)	
Australia	27 Nov 2002	University of Wollongong	Doctor of the University of Wollongong	
US	17 Marc] 2004	University of North Texas	Doctor of music composition and performance, honoris causa	
US	21 April 2006	St. John's University (New York City)	Honorary doctor of science	
UK	21 Feb 2007	Durham University	Honorary doctor of civil law	
UK	3 Aug 2007	Liverpool John Moores University	Honorary doctor of science	
Japan	31 May 2012	Sōka University	Honorary doctor of economics	

== Honorific eponyms ==
=== Place ===
- Thailand: Bhumibol Dam, Tak
- Thailand: King's College Under Royal Patronage, Nakhon Pathom
- Thailand: Bhumibol Adulyadej Hospital, Bangkok
- Thailand: Bhumibol Bridge, Bangkok and Samut Prakan
- Thailand: Rama IX Road, Bangkok
- Thailand: Rama IX Bridge, Bangkok
- Thailand: Bhumibol Sangkeet Building, College of Music, Mahidol University, Nakhon Pathom
- Thailand: Wat Praram kao Kanchanapisek, Bangkok
- Thailand: Suan Luang Rama IX, Bangkok
- Thailand: King Rama IX Memorial Park, Bangkok
- Thailand: His Majesty the King's 80th Birthday Anniversary, 5 December 2007, Sports Complex, Nakhon Ratchasima
- Thailand: Fort Bhumibol, the Artillery Center, Royal Thai Army, Lopburi
- US: King Bhumibol Adulyadej Square, Cambridge, Massachusetts

=== Species ===
- Trisepalum bhumibolianum
- Jasminum bhumibolianum
- Tulipa ‘King Bhumibol’
- Amphioctopus rex (Nateewathana & Norman, 1999)
- Potamon bhumibol Naiyanetr, 2001

=== Other ===
- Royal barge Narai Song Suban HM Rama IX
- HTMS Bhumibol Adulyadej

== See also ==
- List of honours of the Thai royal family by country
