= Rama III – Dao Khanong – Western Bangkok Outer Ring Road Expressway =

The Rama III - Dao Khanong - Western Bangkok Outer Ring Road Expressway (Thai: ทางพิเศษสายพระราม 3-ดาวคะนอง-วงแหวนรอบนอกกรุงเทพมหานครด้านตะวันตก) is an expressway project of the Expressway Authority of Thailand that is currently under construction. The project is to expand the expressway network to efficiently accommodate travel between the outer and inner areas of Bangkok, as well as to alleviate traffic congestion on Rama II Road, the Chaloem Maha Nakhon Expressway (Suksawat–Dao Khanong section), and the Rama IX Bridge, the route begins at the Bang Khun Thian Interchange connecting from Motorway No. 82 and runs as an elevated structure above Rama II Road and the Chaloem Maha Nakhon Expressway. It crosses the Chao Phraya River via the Thotsama Rachan Bridge and terminates at the Bang Khlo Interchange, where it connects with the Chaloem Maha Nakhon Expressway and the Si Rat Expressway, covering a total distance of 18.7 kilometers (11.6 miles). Currently, service is available only on the section involving the Thotsamarachan Bridge—which opened on January 29, 2025—while the full route is expected to open in mid-2026, coinciding with the opening of Motorway No. 82.
