= Thotsamarachan Bridge =

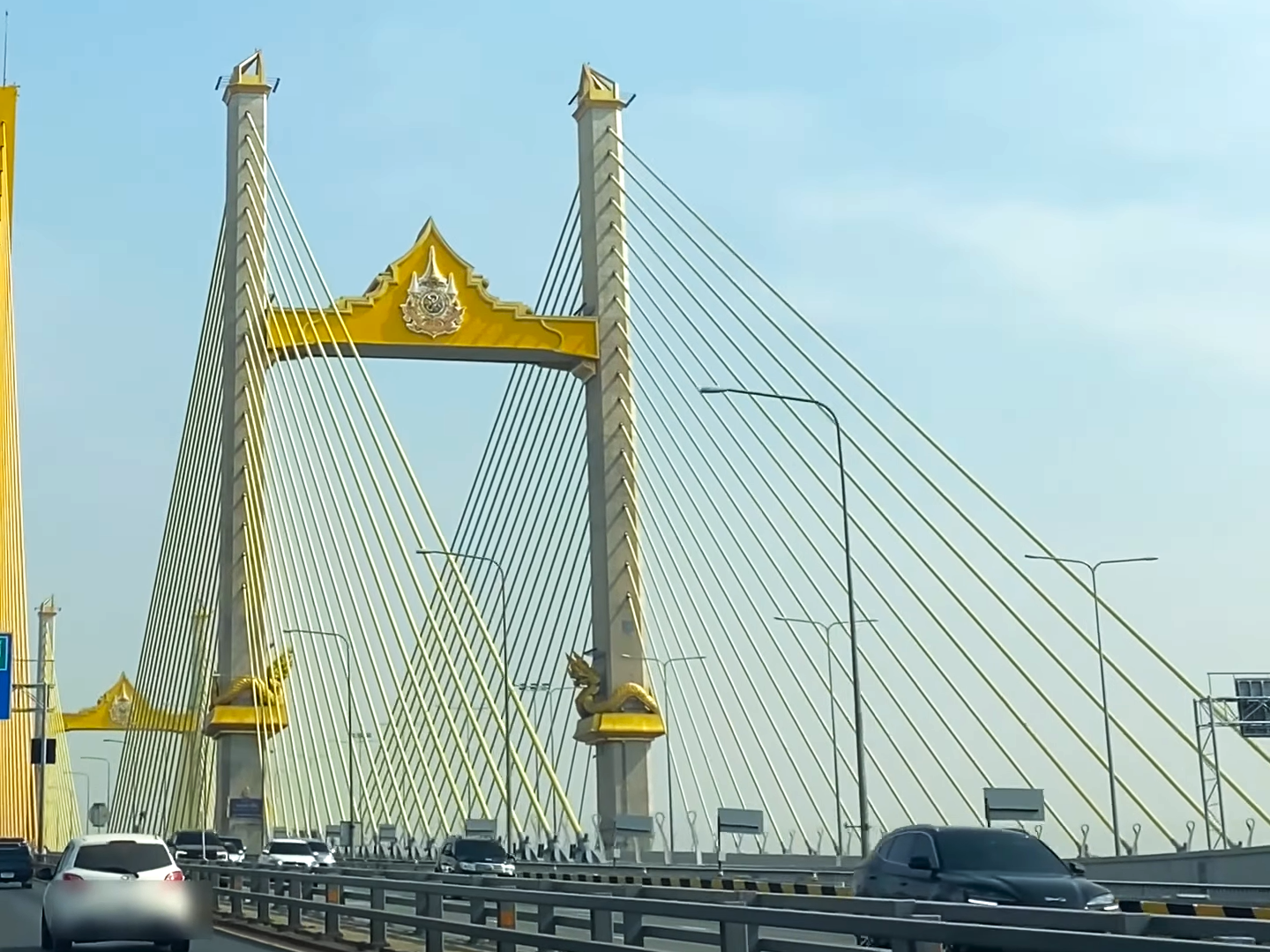
- The view of the Thotsamarachan Bridge from Rama IX Bridge in January 2025.
- Coordinates: 13.68201°N 100.51798°E
- Carries: Rama III-Dao Khanong-Western Outer Ring Road Expressway
- Crosses: Chao Phraya River
- Locale: Bang Phongphang, Yan Nawa; Rat Burana, Rat Burana; Bangkok
- Official name: Thotsamarachan Bridge
- Other name: Rama IX Bridge Parallel Bridge
- Named for: King Vajiralongkorn
- Maintained by: Expressway Authority of Thailand
- Preceded by: Rama IX Bridge
- Followed by: Bhumibol Bridge 1

Characteristics
- Design: Cable-stayed bridge
- Material: Steel and concrete
- Total length: 450 metres (1,480 ft)
- Width: 42 metres (138 ft)
- Height: 87 metres (285 ft)
- Longest span: 781.20 metres (2,563.0 ft)
- Piers in water: 4
- Clearance below: 41 metres (135 ft)

History
- Designer: Epsilon Company Limited
- Constructed by: CH. Karnchang Public Company Limited
- Construction start: January 16, 2020; 6 years ago
- Construction end: March 30, 2023; 3 years ago
- Construction cost: ฿6,636,192,131.80 million
- Opened: December 14, 2024; 18 months ago

Location
- Interactive map of Thotsamarachan Bridge

Thotsamarachan Bridge (Thai: สะพานทศมราชัน), tentatively named Rama IX Bridge Parallel Bridge (Thai: สะพานคู่ขนานสะพานพระราม 9), is a cable-stayed road bridge across the Chao Phraya River in Bangkok, on the route of the Rama III-Dao Khanong-Western Outer Ring Road Expressway , operated by the Expressway Authority of Thailand. It is the first double-pillar cable-stayed bridge in Thailand, with 8 lanes and approximately 42 meters wide, making it the widest river-crossing bridge in Thailand. It is located parallel to the downstream side of Rama IX Bridge and was built to replace Rama IX Bridge, which will be closed for renovations after the full opening of the Rama III-Dao Khanong-Western Outer Ring Road Expressway. The Ministry of Transport has also designated it as a project in honor of King Vajiralongkorn. Construction began on January 16, 2020 completed on March 30, 2023 and His Majesty presided over the opening of the bridge on December 14, 2024 but traffic began to open on January 29, 2025. It is expected to be able to accommodate a large volume of cars, approximately 150,000 cars per day.

== Characteristics of the bridge ==
=== Overall appearance ===
The Thotsamarachan Bridge, designed by Epsilon Co., Ltd., is the first double-pylon cable-stayed bridge in Thailand. It runs parallel to the downstream side of Rama IX Bridge. It has eight lanes (divided into four lanes for inbound and four lanes for outbound traffic) and measures approximately 42 meters wide from both sides of the bridge, making it the widest river-crossing bridge in Thailand. The bridge is elevated from the second level, approximately 10 meters above ground level, allowing motorists to more easily go up and down the bridge. This reduces the slowdown caused by traffic congestion on the way up, a common problem with Rama IX Bridge. The underside of the bridge is 41 meters above sea level, and the pylons are 87 meters high, the same height as Rama IX Bridge. The length of the bridge is similar to Rama IX Bridge, with the middle span being 450 meters long and the bridge itself being 781.20 meters long.

The Thotsamarachan Bridge begins at the foot of Rama IX Bridge on the Thonburi side in Rat Burana Subdistrict, Rat Burana District, crossing the Chao Phraya River to connect to a six-lane elevated road and converging with the Bang Khlo Interchange in Bang Phongphang, Yannawa District, directly connecting to the Si Rat Expressway and the Chaloem Maha Nakhon Expressway. The total project distance is 2 kilometers, with the bridge designed to be consistent and harmonious without being more prominent than the Rama IX Bridge.

The Expressway Authority of Thailand also conducted a full engineering simulation of the bridge to test its strength under wind loads. The test results showed that the Thotsamarachan Bridge can withstand winds of up to 270 kilometers per hour, equivalent to the force of a tornado, making it stable and strong enough to withstand earthquakes or storms.
