= King Mongkut's University =

There are three Thai public universities (originally as three campuses) sharing the name prefix of King Mongkut's University.

King Mongkut's University may refer to:

- King Mongkut's University of Technology Thonburi
- King Mongkut's University of Technology North Bangkok

King Mongkut's Institute may refer to:

- King Mongkut's Institute of Technology Ladkrabang
