= Wat Prasert Sutthawat =

Thai Buddhist temple in Bangkok, Thailand

- Wat Klang
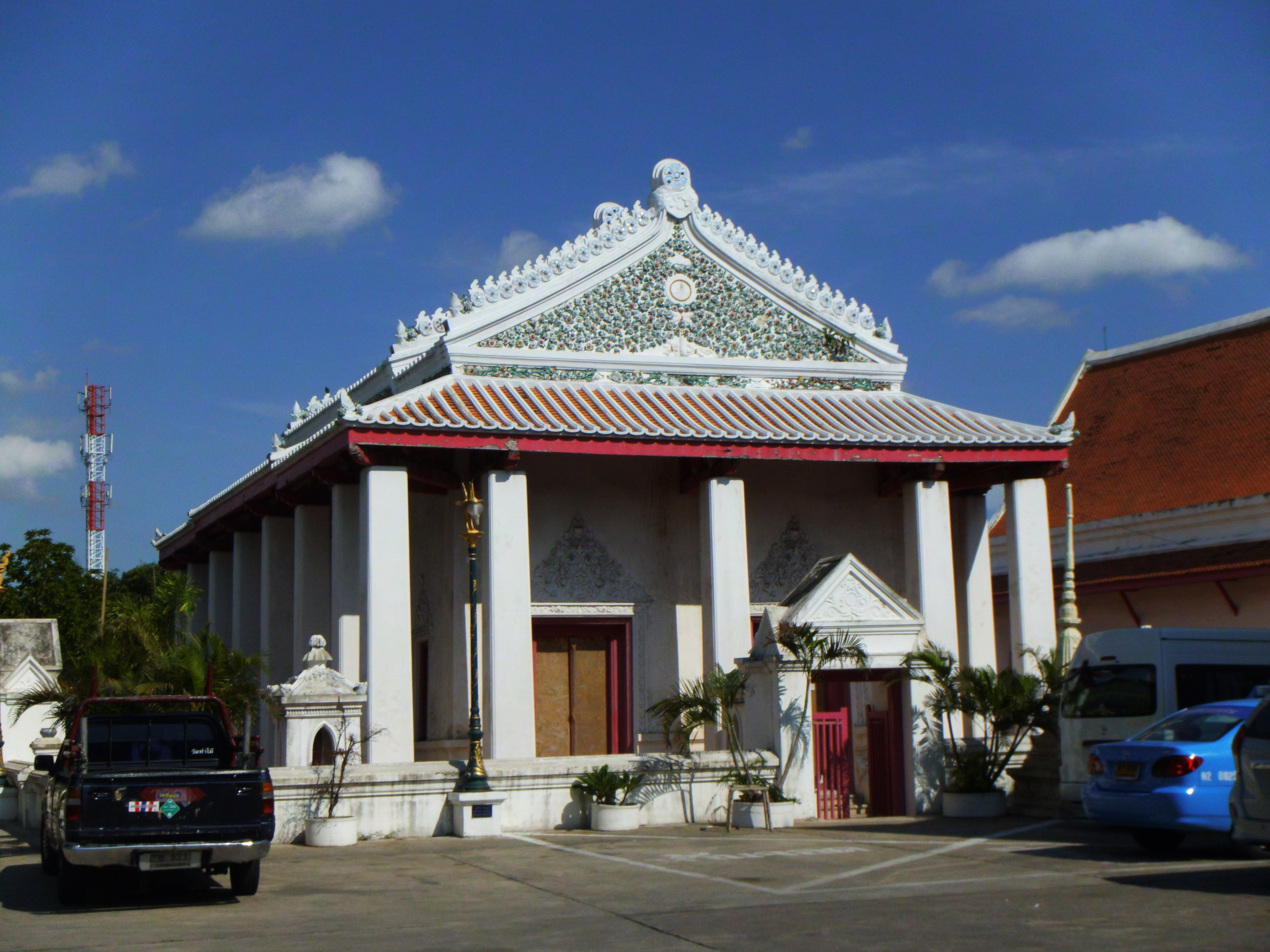
- The ubosot

- Location within Bangkok

Religion
- Affiliation: Buddhism
- Sect: Theravāda Mahā Nikāya
- Status: Civil temple

Location
- Location: 10 Rat Phatthana rd, Bang Pakok, Rat Burana, Bangkok 10140
- Country: Thailand
- Interactive map of Wat Prasert Sutthawat
- Coordinates: 13.679722°N 100.503611°E

Architecture
- Founder: unknown
- Completed: 1838

Wat Prasert Sutthawat, also written as Wat Prasoet Sutthawat (Thai: วัดประเสริฐสุทธาวาส), often abbreviated to Wat Prasert (วัดประเสริฐ) is an ancient Thai Buddhist temple in Bangkok.

== Background ==
The old civil monastery built in 1838 located by the canal Khlong Rat Burana. Its history is told that a pig-raising Chinese had found three large jars full of money. He donated to build the temple. Later, the magnate, Phra Prasertwanit (Seng Sreshthaputra) had the monastery renovated and dedicated to King Nangklao (Rama III), the king conferred the name Wat Prasert Bunpha Sutthawat (วัดประเสริฐบุณพสุธาวาส) to the temple.

It was renamed to current name, but the locals prefer to call Wat Klang (วัดกลาง, lit "central temple") due to its location close to the middle of the canal.

The architecture of the temple, especially the ubosot (อุโบสถ, "ordination hall), is Chinese style similar to joss house. Inside there are murals by Chinese artists depicting the story of Romance of the Three Kingdoms in Chinese ink, the only one in Thailand. Assumed that these artists were also the creators of the paintings inside the ubosot of Wat Ratcha-orasaram in the neighbouring, Chom Thong.

Bai sema (ใบเสมา, "temple boundary stone") battlements around ubosot are made of red sandstone. The principle Maravijaya attitude Buddha image named Luang Pho Soisuwannarat (หลวงพ่อสร้อยสุวรรณรัตน์), also made of red sandstone, was of U Thong era.

The Fine Arts Department registered the temple as an ancient monument in 1994.
