= Motorway 82 (Thailand) =

Motorway in Thailand

Motorway Route 82
- ทางหลวงพิเศษหมายเลข 82
- Bang Khun Thian - Ban Phaeo Motorway ถนนสายบางขุนเทียน-บ้านแพ้ว

Route information
- Maintained by Department of Highways (Thailand)
- Length: 78.000 km (48.467 mi)
- Time period: 2019 - present (Bang Khun Thian - Ekkachai) 2022 - present (Ekkachai - Ban Phaeo)

Major junctions
- East end: AH2/ / Bang Khun Thian District, Bangkok
- West end: Mueang Samut Sakhon District, Samut Sakhon Province

Location
- Country: Thailand

Highway system
- Highways in Thailand; Motorways; Asian Highways

Intercity Motorway 82 (Thai: ทางหลวงพิเศษหมายเลข 82) is a motorway project in Thailand featuring an elevated route along Rama II Road. Spanning a distance of 74.000 kilometers (45.981 miles), the route passes through Bangkok, Samut Sakhon Province, Samut Songkhram Province, and Ratchaburi Province. Service is currently available 24 hours a day, toll-free, on both sections, from Bang Khun Thian-Ekachai, opened on October 22, 2025, at 4:00 PM, and Ekkachai-Ban Phaeo, opened on August 28, 2026, at 10:00AM. While the tendering process for system installation is being prepared; the winning bidder is expected to be selected and installation to begin in 2027. Meanwhile, the Ban Phaeo–Pak Tho section is currently under study.

== Routes ==
=== Bang Khun Thian - Ekachai - Ban Phaeo ===
The Route splits into 2 sections.

==== Bang Khun Thian - Ekachai Route ====
The Bang Khun Thian - Ekkachai section starts at the end of Rama III – Dao Khanong – Western Bangkok Outer Ring Road Expressway, then crosses Samut Sakhon Province and ends near Ekkachai Interchange , if go straight, it will continue to Ban Phaeo District.

==== Ekkachai - Ban Phaeo Route ====
The Ekkachai - Ban Phaeo section continues from Bang Khun Thian - Ekkachai Route then crosses Tha Chin River then ends at Ban Phaeo district.

== Openings ==
Motorway No. 82 has opened for a trial run on the section between Bang Khun Thian and Ekachai—where all civil works are complete—including the connection to the Southern Kanchanaphisek Expressway, the Phan Thai Norasing Toll Plaza, and the Maha Chai 1 Toll Plaza. Operations began at 4:00 PM on October 22, 2025, and run 24 hours a day without toll charges. While the route accommodates all vehicle types, a speed limit of no more than 80 km/h is recommended, except for trucks, which are restricted to a maximum speed of 65 km/h.

Later, a trial service was launched for the additional section between Ekachai and Ban Phaeo—extending from the Maha Chai 1 toll entry/exit point on Ekachai Road to the end of the elevated structure at Ban Phaeo. This service began at 10:00 AM on August 28, 2026, operating 24 hours a day without toll charges. Two additional entry/exit points—Maha Chai 2 and Ban Phaeo—were also opened; however, two others, Samut Sakhon 1 and Samut Sakhon 2, remain closed due to ongoing construction, which is expected to be completed by the end of the same year.

== Incidents ==
=== 2026 Motorway 82 crane collapse ===
In 15 January, 2026 a construction crane at Motorway 82 project collapsed onto cars at Rama II Road (outbound) around kilometre 30, opposite Talat Thale Thai, causing 2 injured people and 2 cars damaged.

Later in 20 January, 2026, a fire broke out in the wreckage of a pickup truck that had been crushed by a collapsing crane during the crane's dismantling process.

=== 2026 Cement fragments fell onto 2 cars ===
In 22 October, 2026 a cement fragments fell onto 2 cars approximately 07:13 AM , causing damage to the front hood of the car, fortunately there are no injuries or deaths.
