= List of firsts in Thailand =

This is a list of firsts in Thailand.

== Education ==
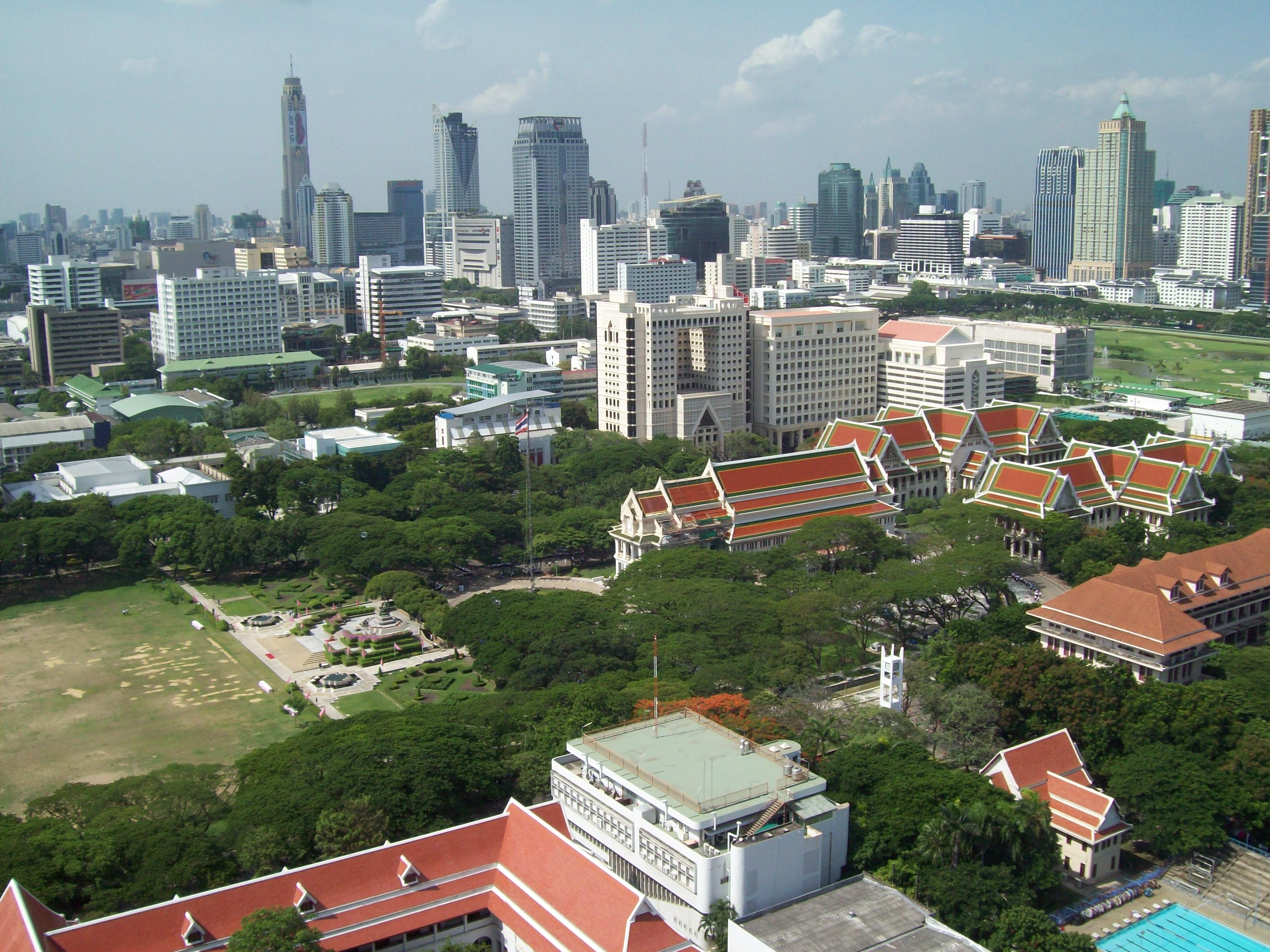
Chulalongkorn University

- First University: Chulalongkorn University, founded in 1917.
- First private school: Bangkok Christian College, founded in 1852.
- First public secondary school: Suankularb Wittayalai School, founded in 1882.
- First textbook of the Thai language: Chindamani, Written during King Narai's reign (1656-1688).

== Energy ==
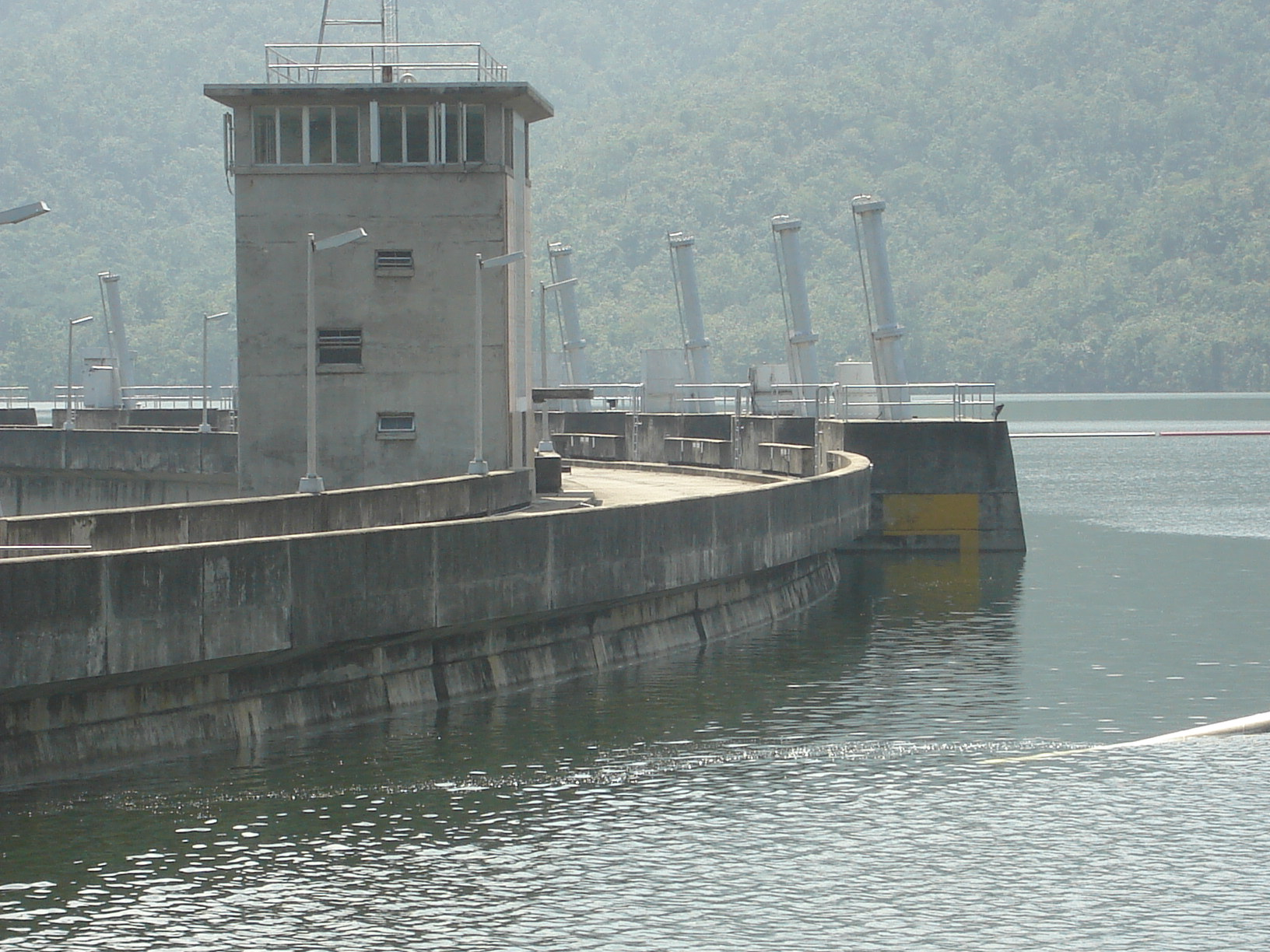
Bhumibol Dam

- First multi-purpose hydroelectric dam: Bhumibol Dam, finished in 1964.
- First time electricity was generated in Thailand: Chakri Maha Prasat Throne Hall, 1884

== Exploration ==
- First Thai to reach the peak of Mount Everest: Withitnan Rojanapanich, 2008.
- First Thai to reach Antarctica: Princess Sirindhorn, 1993

== Military ==
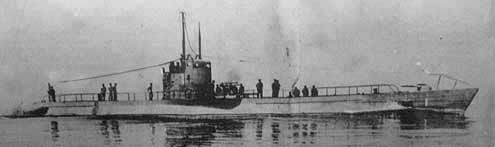
HTMS Matchanu, one of the first 4 submarines in the Royal Siamese Navy

- First submarines in the Royal Siamese Navy: Matchanu-class submarine, all 4 ships are commissioned in 1938.
- First aircraft carrier in the Royal Thai Navy: HTMS Chakri Naruebet, commissioned in 1997.

== Politics and government ==
- First major Tai kingdom: Sukhothai Kingdom: 1238–1438
- First monarch of the Chakri Dynasty: Rama I: 6 April, 1782 – 7 September, 1809.
- First prime minister: Phraya Manopakorn Nititada: 28 June, 1932- 20 June, 1933.
- First female prime minister: Yingluck Shinawatra: 5 August, 2011- 7 May, 2014.
- First political party: Progressive Party, founded in 1945.
- First successful coup against the constitutional government: 1933 Siamese coup d'état, 1933.
- First and only naval officer to serve as prime minister: Thawan Thamrongnawasawat, 1946.

== Sports ==
=== Olympics ===
- First Olympic games where Thailand participated: 1952 Summer Olympics, 1952.
- First Thai Olympic medalist: Payao Poontarat (Boxing), Also the first Thai bronze Olympic medalist, 1976.
- First Thai gold Olympic Medalist: Somluck Kamsing (Boxing), 1996
- First Thai silver Olympic Medalist: Dhawee Umponmaha (Boxing), 1984.

=== Asian Games ===
- First Asian Games held in Thailand: 1966 Asian Games, 1966.

== Transportation ==
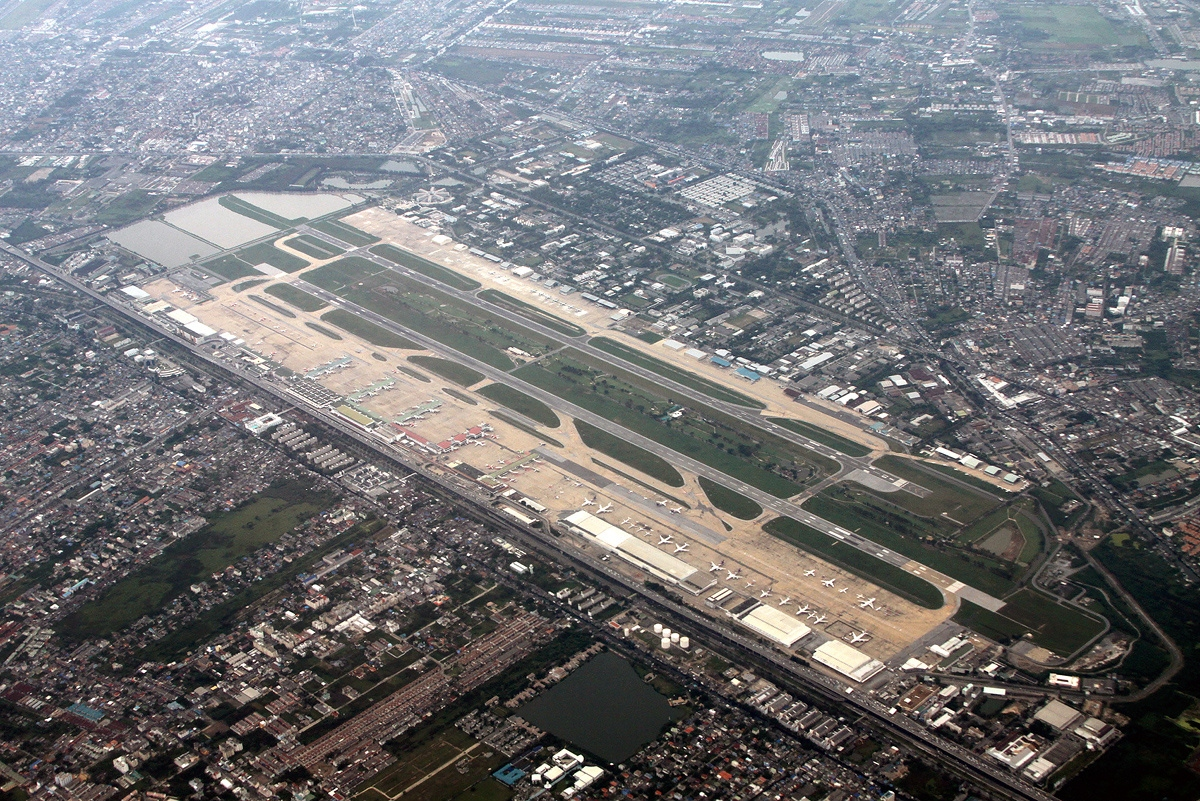
Don Mueng Airport, the oldest airport in Asia.

- First road built using modern construction methods: Chaoroen Krung road, opened in 1864.
- First railway line, first electric railway service: Paknam Railway, established in 1893, electrified in 1959
- First airport: Don Mueng International Airport, opened in 1914. Also regarded as the oldest airport in Asia.
- First car imported to Thailand: Imported by the royal family, 1900s.
- First flight demonstration in Siam: Henry Farman Biplane flown by Charles Van Den Born, 1911
- First bridge across the lower Mekong, First Thai–Lao Friendship Bridge, opened in 1994.

== Others ==
- First zoo: Dusit zoo, Bangkok, opened in 1938.
- First national park: Khao Yai National Park, established in 1962.
- First coastal national park of Thailand: Khao Sam Roi Yot National Park, established in 1966.

== See also ==
- List of records of Thailand
