= Faculty of Architecture, Urban Design and Creative Arts, Mahasarakham University =

Architecture school at the Mahasarakham University

Coordinates: 16°12′11″N 103°16′46″E

The Faculty of Architecture, Urban Design and Creative Arts at the Mahasarakham University is hosted in Khamriang Campus located in the city of Mahasarakham, Thailand.

The Faculty has missions in educational development, and research, with emphasis on the integrated approach to planning, design, and architecture that will be necessary to take on the 21st century global challenges of urbanization, environmental conservation, and climate change, as well as preservation of arts and culture, and improved local and social development.

== History ==
The faculty was originally established under an academic program development project initiated by the Faculty of Fine and Applied Arts at Mahasarakham University. The project has transitioned and organized to become Faculty of Architecture, Urban Design & Creative Arts during 1998 - July 2000.

The Faculty has focused on human resource development in the areas of architecture, urban design, and creative arts, and on promoting art and cultural conservation.

== Departments and Programs ==
Today the Faculty is made up of five Departments, Architecture, Architecture & Urban Planning, Interior Architecture, Creative Arts, Landscape Architecture, and offers five bachelor's degree programs (B.Arch., B.F.A., B.L.A., B.Sc.), and one master's degree program (M.U.P.).

- Bachelor of Architecture Program in Urban Architecture —- B.Arch.(Urban Architecture)
- Bachelor of Architecture Program in Interior Architecture —- B.Arch.(Interior Architecture)
- Bachelor of Science Program in Architecture —- B.Sc.(Architecture)
- Bachelor of Fine and Applied Arts Program in Creative Arts —- B.F.A.(Creative Arts)
- Bachelor of Landscape Architecture Program —- B.L.A. (Landscape Architecture)
- Master of Urban Planning Program in Urban & Environmental Planning —- M.U.P. (Urban and Environmental Planning)

== See also ==
- Mahasarakham University
- คณะสถาปัตยกรรมศาสตร์ ผังเมืองและนฤมิตศิลป์ (in Thai)
