= Rat Burana subdistrict =

Rat Burana ราษฎร์บูรณะ
- Khwaeng
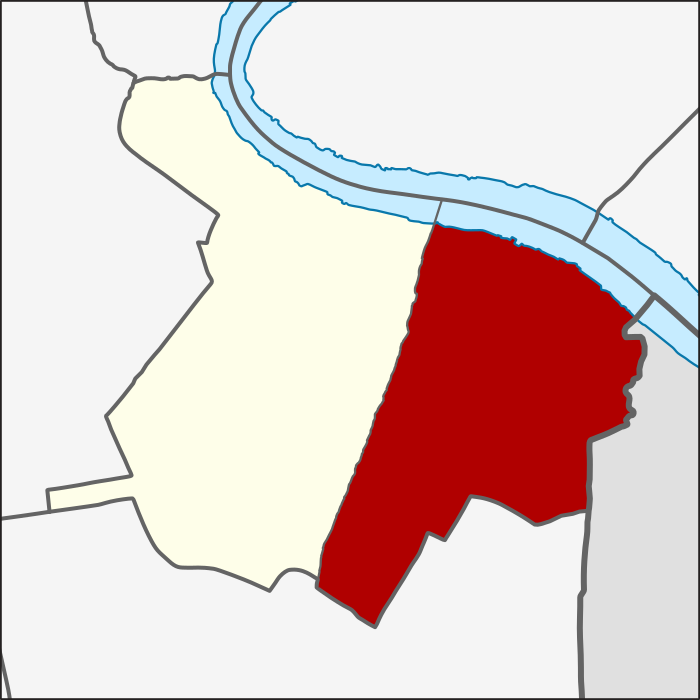
- Location in Rat Burana District
- Country: Thailand
- Province: Bangkok
- Khet: Rat Burana

Area
  - Total: 6.716 km^{2} (2.593 sq mi)

Population (2020)
  - Total: 31,049
- Time zone: UTC+7 (ICT)
- Postal code: 10140
- TIS 1099: 102401

Rat Burana (Thai: ราษฎร์บูรณะ, pronounced [râːt būː.rā.náʔ]) is a khwaeng (subdistrict) of Rat Burana District, in Bangkok, Thailand. In 2020, it had a total population of 31,049 people.
