= Rat Burana district =

Rat Burana ราษฎร์บูรณะ
- Khet
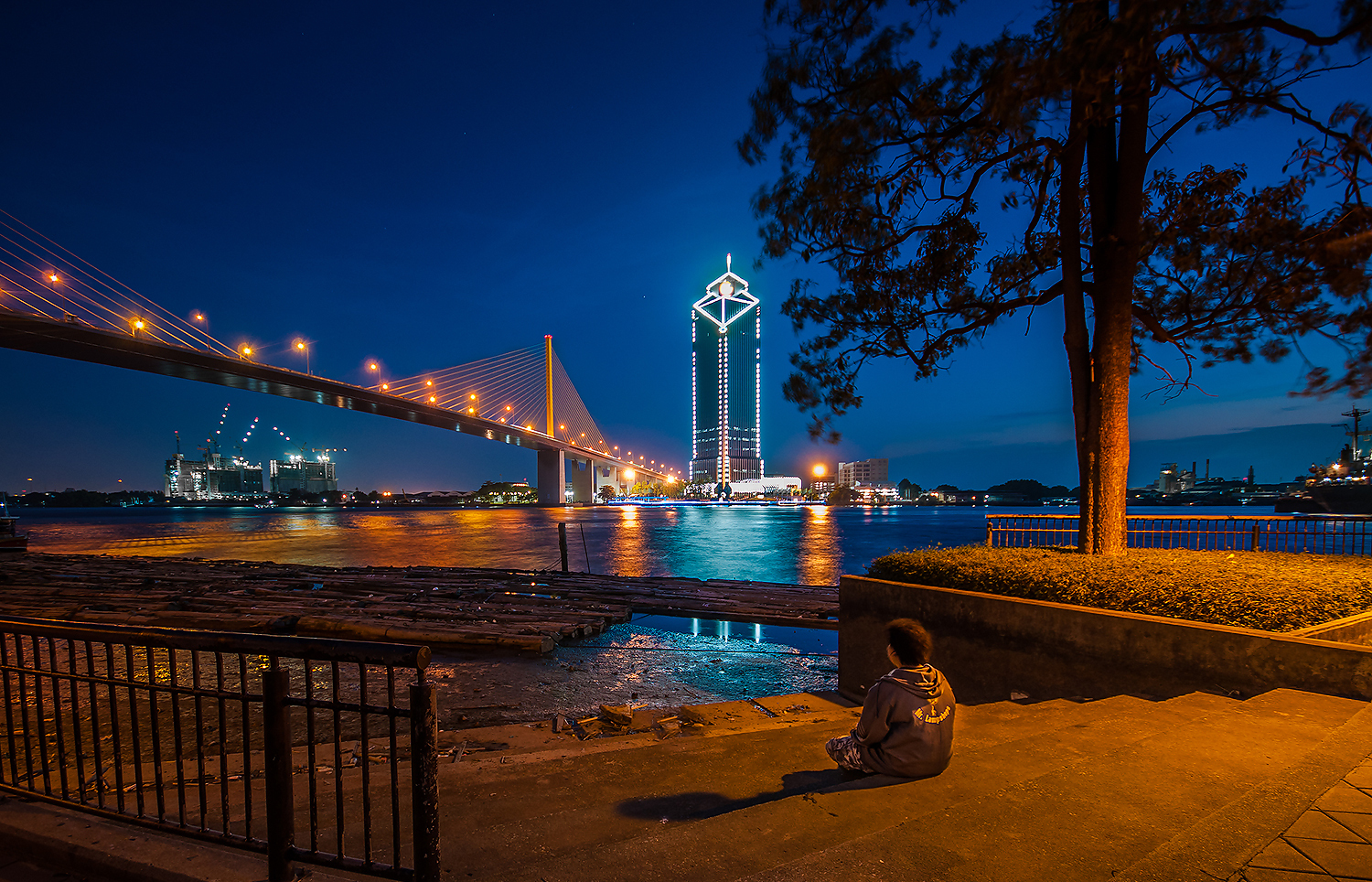
- KBank Head Office, located at the foot of the Rama IX Bridge near the Chao Phraya River, Rat Burana

- Khet location in Bangkok
- Coordinates: 13°40′56″N 100°30′20″E
- Country: Thailand
- Province: Bangkok
- Seat: Rat Burana
- Khwaeng: 2

Area
  - Total: 15.782 km^{2} (6.093 sq mi)

Population (2017)
  - Total: 82,545
  - Density: 5,230.32/km^{2} (13,546.5/sq mi)
- Time zone: UTC+7 (THA)
- Postal code: 10140
- Geocode: 1024

Rat Burana (Thai: ราษฎร์บูรณะ, pronounced [râːt būːrānáʔ]) is one of the 50 districts (khet) of Bangkok, Thailand. The district is bounded by (clockwise from east to north) Phra Pradaeng of Samut Prakan province, Thung Khru, Chom Thong and Thon Buri districts of Bangkok while its north to east is Chao Phraya River with (clockwise) Bang Kho Laem and Yan Nawa districts across the river.

== History ==
The area was settled as a frontier for Thonburi when King Taksin established Thonburi as the new capital. Later administration reform placed Rat Burana as an amphoe of Thonburi province. It was then moved to Nakhon Khuan Khan province (now Amphoe Phra Pradaeng) until the province was demoted to an amphoe of Samut Prakan province. It was then moved back to Thonburi province until Thonburi and Bangkok were merged. It is now a district of Bangkok. In 1998, part of Rat Burana left to form a new district, Thung Khru.

The name Rat Burana literally translates to "restored by the people" (or "restored by the king" in another sense). Its name is after the local temple of the same name, located near the current district office along the mouth of Khlong Rat Burana Canal that empties to the Chao Phraya River. The old temple dating back to late Ayutthaya period. It is assumed that it was built around the year 1767 (contemporary with the second fall of Ayutthaya).

The area of Rat Burana district in the past was orchards adjacent to the Chao Phraya River, Rat Burana residents have a career as a farmer in areca palm cultivation (paired with betel of Talat Phlu in Thonburi district) and what used to be most famous was Chompoo mamiao (ชมพู่มะเหมี่ยว; a variety of rose apple), which had a sweet crispy flavor.

In addition to Wat Rat Burana, the district is home to many important ancient temples, such as Wat Prasert Sutthawat, Wat Bang Pakok, Wat Chaeng Ron, Wat Son, with also the location of the "Rama IX Bridge" important transportation routes as well.

In 2015, Baan Khru Noi, "One of Bangkok's oldest" charity homes for children, was scheduled to close after 30 years.

== Administration ==
The district is sub-divided into two sub-districts (khwaeng).

No.	Name	Thai	Area (km^{2})	Map
1.	Rat Burana	ราษฎร์บูรณะ	6.716	Map
2.	Bang Pakok	บางปะกอก	9.066	Map
Total			15.782	Map
