= Thaksin University =

Public university in Songkhla, Thailand

- มหาวิทยาลัยทักษิณ
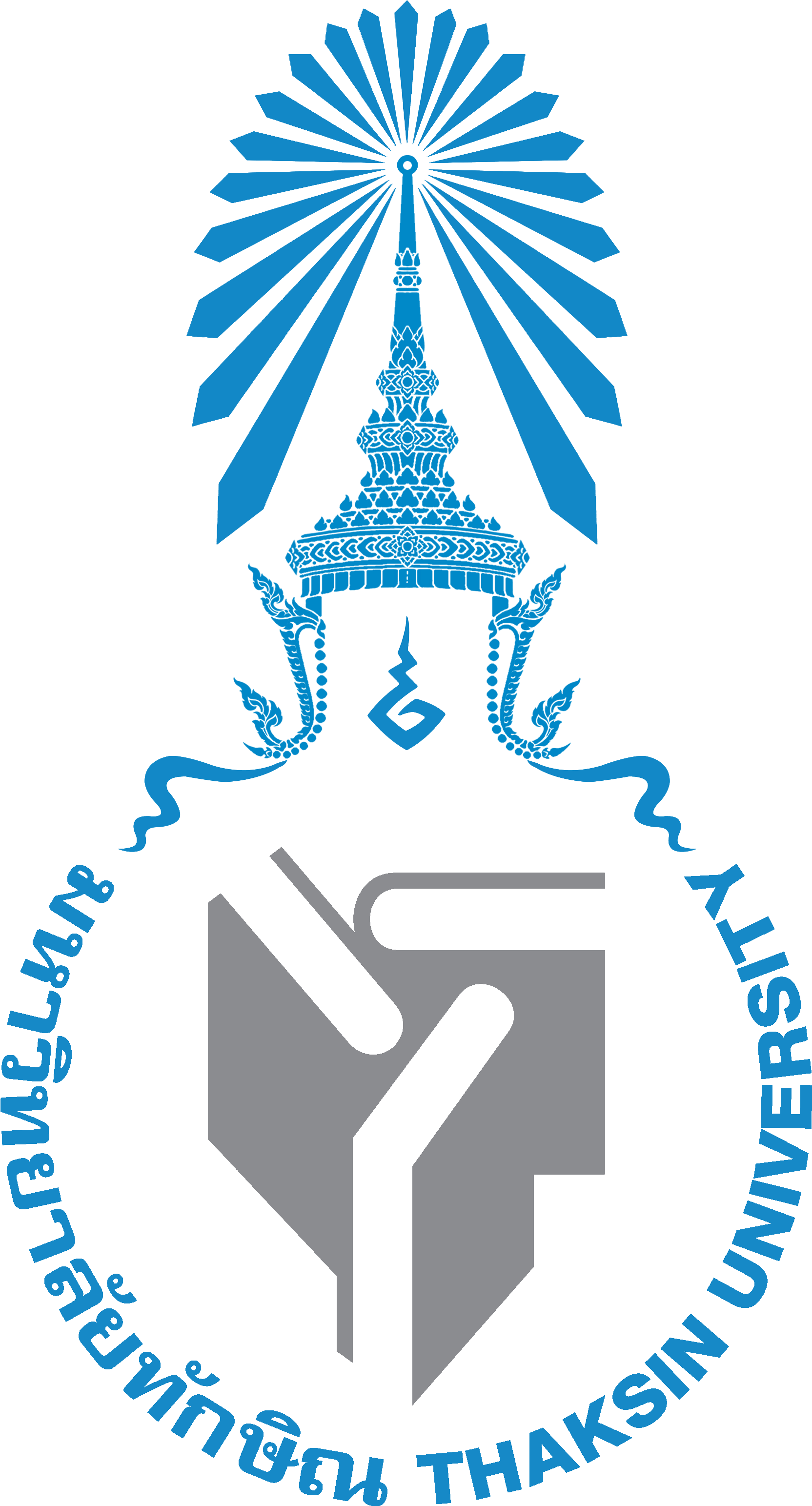
- Motto: Intellect and Morality, Precede Development
- Type: Autonomous public university
- Established: 1968 (as Songkhla College of Education); 1974 (as Srinakharinwirot University, Songkhla campus); 1989 (as Srinakharinwirot University, Southern campus); 1996 (as Thaksin University)
- Affiliations: ASAIHL
- President: Natthapong Chitniratna
- Royal conferrer: Maha Chakri Sirindhorn, Princess Royal of Thailand on behalf of the King
- Location: Songkhla, Thailand; 7°09′45″N 100°36′35″E
- Campus: Songkhla and Phatthalung
- Colours: Grey and Blue
- Website: www.tsu.ac.th

Thaksin University (Thai: มหาวิทยาลัยทักษิณ, translating to "University of the South"), is a public university in Southern Thailand. It is located in Muang Songkhla District, Songkhla province. It is about twenty kilometers from Hat Yai District. Previously, Thaksin University was a branch campus of Srinakharinwirot University. Afterwards it grew in size and eventually became a separate university. Thaksin University was established as an independent public university on 1 September 1996.

The university name was granted via a Royal Decree by King Bhumibol Adulyadej, who granted the university the name of Thaksin, which means "southern". The aim of the university is to encourage and preserve the culture of Southern Thailand.

The university has two campuses and one center in Bangkok. The campuses are in Tambon Khao-Roop-Chang, Amphoe Muang Songkhla, Songkhla and Tambon Ban Plao, Pa Payom District, Phattalung. The Phattalung Campus was founded in 1989. The university offers undergraduate education degrees, postgraduate education degrees, and doctoral education degrees in Sciences, Medical Sciences, Social Sciences and Humanities. It has a special International Graduate Program that offers research-based Ph.D. programs through the region under the supervision of senior academics from international universities.

Thaksin University is the juristic body under the responsibility of the Office of the Higher Education Commission. Associate professor Doctor Somkiat Saithanoo holds the position of university president.

== History ==
Thaksin University, named from the Sanskrit word 'Thaksin' meaning 'of the South', is an autonomous university of the Royal Thai Government. An early adopted, Thaksin University achieved this independence of management while continuing to receive Government budget when parliament passed the Thaksin University Act, which became effective on September 1, 1996. It shares this special status with a select number of other institutions that have embarked on a process to become global institutions that operate with a degree of autonomy compared to those that continue as effectively part of the public service model. Beginning life as the College of Education in Songkhla on October 1, 1968, it became Srinakharinwirot University, Songkhla Campus. Its initial four-year degree programs have since expanded now include all degree levels in most academic disciplines in established faculties across the two main campuses of Songkhla and Phattalung. In 2010, the Thaksin University Council approved an International Ph.D. program based on research; the program is wholly managed through the university and based on international standards and approaches with respected senior academic staff from a range of developed nations.

== Programs, Campuses and Centers ==
=== International Ph.D. Program ===
The Thaksin University International Ph.D. Program is wholly based on research following the traditional and elite international model. Distinct from other programs, it has no coursework requirements except to remedy specific needs of individual candidates, and is based on advancing knowledge. Conducted in English and styled through the lens of 'sustainable development', the program admits qualified candidates from any nation across most disciplines within the humanities and sciences, including economics, business, law, agriculture, engineering, community development, marketing, politics, architecture, health, the arts, education, history, geography and the ASEAN region. Candidates are supervised and their final work examined by international experts drawn from highly-ranked international universities. Graduates to date have published in international journals and the university's imprint TSU Press has published books based on their work.

=== Songkhla Campus ===
Songkhla campus has two operational sites:

The first campus with academic facilities is at 140 Kanjanawanit Road, Moo 4, Tambon Khao-Roop-Chang, Muang District, Songkhla Province and occupies an area of 142 rai (approximately 56 acres).
The second site is in Baan Ao Sai, Ko Yo, Muang District, Songkhla Province on a 24 rai (approximately 9.5 acres). The Institute for Southern Thai Studies is located here.

=== Phattalung Campus ===
Phattalung campus has two operational sites:

The first campus with academic facilities is situated in Tambon Ban Plao, Pa Payom District and occupies an area of about 3,500 rai (approximately 1,400 acres).
The second site is in Tambon Phanangtung, Khuan Khanun District on 1,500 rai (approximately 600 acres) and houses the College of Community Wisdom.

=== Samsen Nai Center ===
Samsen Nai center is the head office of the Management for Development College of Thaksin University (U-MDC)

133 Sinobrit Building. Vibhavadi Rangsit Road, Samsen Nai, Phayathai, Bangkok 10400 (opposite Surasakmontree School and University of the Thai Chamber of Commerce).

== Academics ==
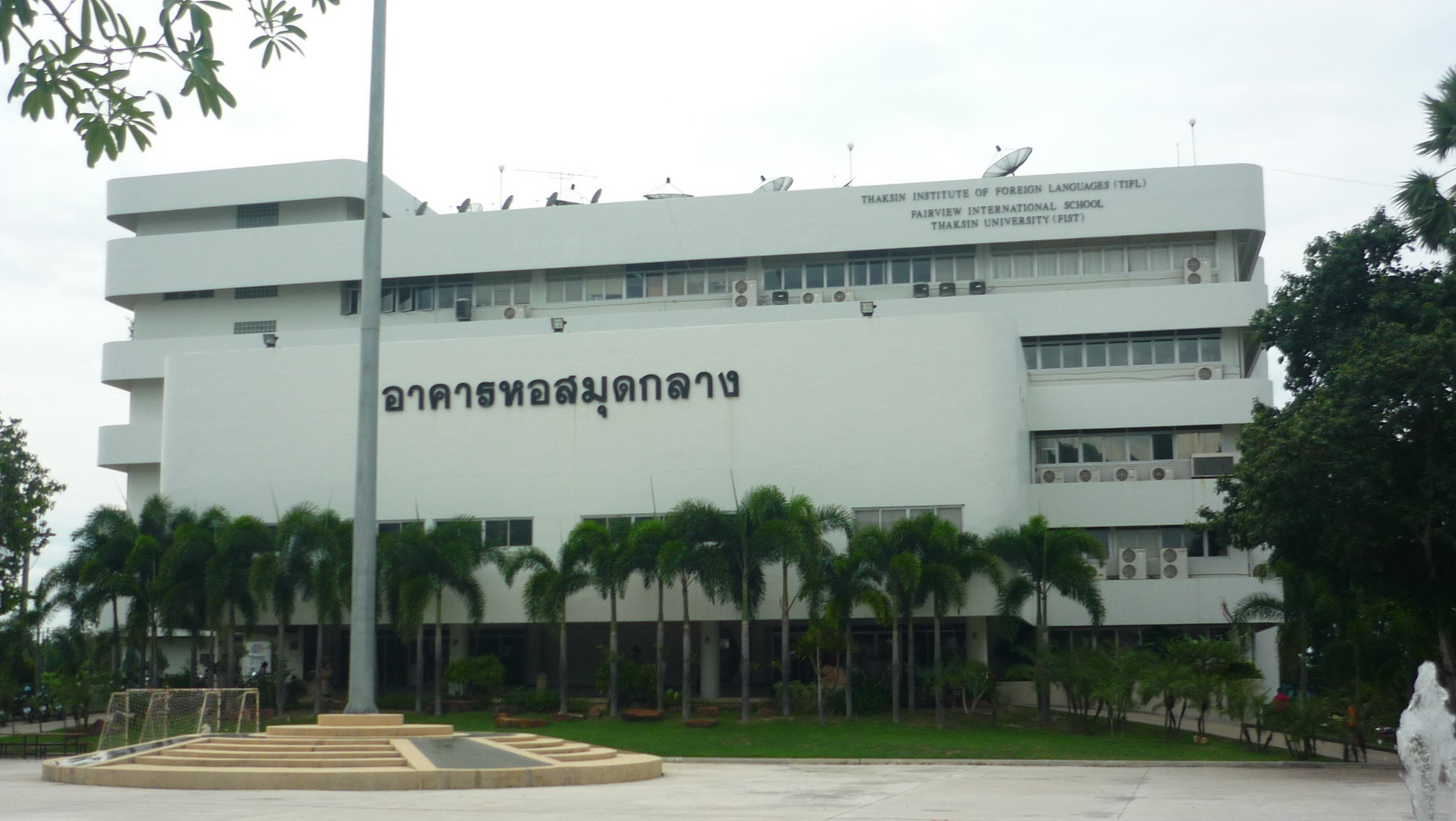
The Institute of Foreign Language

Thaksin University consists of eight faculties and other institutions, divided into two campuses.

Songkhla Campus

- Faculty of Humanities and Social Sciences consists of 7 programs and one establishment project;

Liberal and Information Sciences
Thai Language
Oriental Languages
Western Languages
Geography
Public Administration and Human Resource Management
Social Sciences
The Project for The Foundation of Islamic Studies for Integration in Southernmost Provinces

- Faculty of Education consists of six programs

Evaluation and Research
Guidance and Psychology
Educational Administration
Curriculum and Instruction
Educational Technology
Physical Education

- Faculty of Fine Arts consists of three programs

Visual Arts
Performing Arts
Music

- Faculty of Economic and Business Administration consists of 3 programs

Economics
Accounting
Business Administration

- Faculty of Law consists of one program

Law

- Graduated School
- Management For Development College of Thaksin University (U-MDC)
- The Institute for Southern Thai Studies, Thaksin University
- The Institute of Foreign Language
- Fairview International School, Thaksin University
- The Institute of Community Operation for Integration Studies, Thaksin University
- The Computer Center, Thaksin University
- The Central Library, Thaksin University
- International Graduated Program, Thaksin University

Phattalung Campus

- Faculty of Sciences

Computer Sciences and Information Technology
Mathematics and Statistics
Chemistry
Physics
Biology
Biotechnology and Environment

- Faculty of Health and Sport Sciences

Public Health
Industrial Hygiene and Environmental Health
Sport Sciences

- Faculty of Technology and Community development

Animal Production Technology
Agriculture Technology
Food Science and Technology

- Thaksin University Business Incubation Center: BIC@TSU
- College of Community Wisdom
- Research and Development Institute

== Symbols ==
Symbols of Thaksin University The crown represents the 50th anniversary celebration of His Majesty's accession to the throne. The three textbooks represent intellect, morality, and development.

School flower The symbolic flower of Thaksin University is the ‘parichart’ flower (Erythrina indica lank) which is commonly believed to be a flower growing in the Garden of Lord Indra. Parichart, also known as tonglan, begins to bud in mid-February and is in full bloom by the end of the month which coincides with the end of the academic year.

University colours Gray is the color of the brain and thus signifies thought. Blue is the color of the sea and the sky and signifies a vast expanse. The two colors together mean to think broadly or to think with vision.
