= Mahasarakham University =

Public university in Maha Sarakham, Thailand

- มหาวิทยาลัยมหาสารคาม
- Other name: MSU
- Motto: Bahūnam Paṇḍito Jīve (Pali) (ผู้มีปัญญา พึงเป็นอยู่เพื่อมหาชน)
- Motto in English: Public devotion is a virtue of the learned
- Type: Public
- Established: 1968; 58 years ago
- Academic affiliations: Association of Southeast Asian Institutions of Higher Learning
- Budget: ฿1.184 billion (2025)
- President: Prayook Srivilai
- Royal conferrer: Maha Chakri Sirindhorn, Princess Royal of Thailand on behalf of the King
- Faculty: 1,268 (2016)
- Administrative staff: 2,316 (2016)
- Students: 39,000 (2023)
- Location: Kantharawichai, Maha Sarakham, Thailand; 16°11′58″N 103°17′02″E
- Campus: Urban and regional
Colours
- Website: inter.msu.ac.th
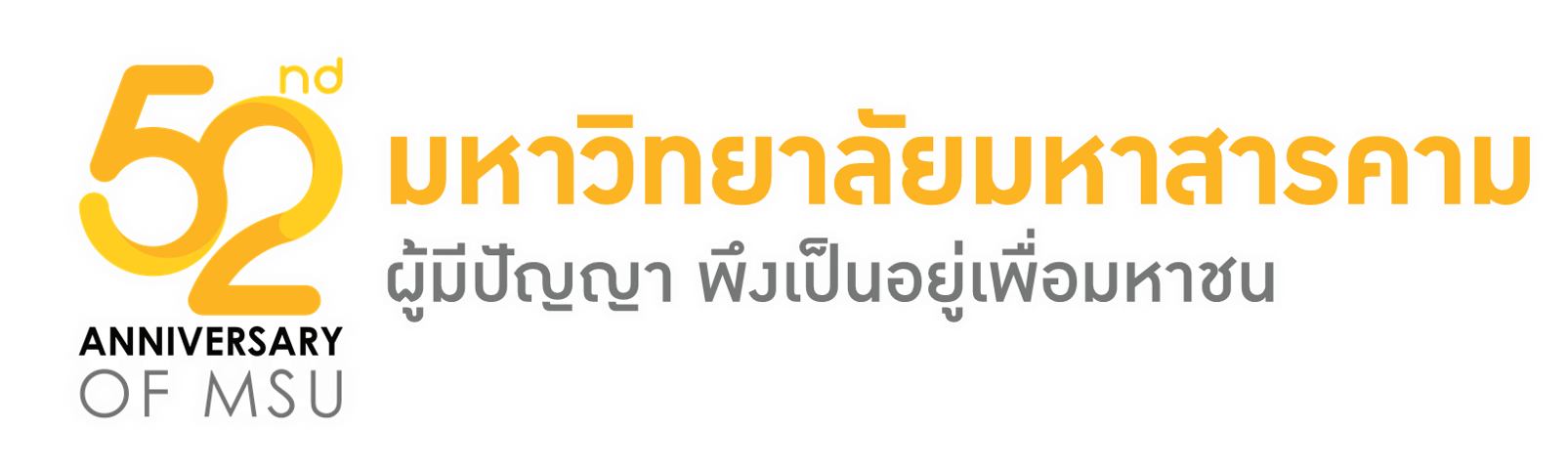

Mahasarakham University (MSU; Thai: มหาวิทยาลัยมหาสารคาม; RTGS: Mahawitthayalai Mahasarakham, pronounced: má-hăa wít-tá-yaa-lai má-hăa-săa-rá-kaam) is a Thai public university in Maha Sarakham province, about 470 kilometres from Bangkok. In 2017 it enrolled 39,000 students.

MSU is the only Thai university to offer postgraduate programs in paleontology and a Bachelor of Arts in the Khmer language. It was the first Isan university to offer a BA in accounting and the second to offer PhD courses in the same subject. Its Faculty of Education, the flagship of MSU, was voted Thailand's Best Education Faculty in 2010 by the National Education Office.

The university is the first Thai higher education institution rated under the QS Stars System for excellence in higher education. It has become one of the top 20 universities in Thailand based on the Webometrics Ranking of World Universities.

== History ==
The development of Mahasarakham University can be traced back to 1963, when it was known as "Mahasarakham Teacher's Training College". On 27 March 1968, it was established as Mahasarakham College of Education for strengthening and expanding higher education in the Northeastern region (Isan) of the nation. Located in the outer north area of Maha Sarakham province, a small town right at the center of the region, the college has been responsible for developing quality educators to serve educational institutions of all levels. In 1974, the college's status was elevated when it became a regional campus of Srinakharinwirot University. At that time, there were four academic faculties: education, humanities, social sciences, and science.

In 1994, the college gained its statutory status through the Thai Higher Education Act and became Mahasarakham University, the 22nd public university of Thailand.

Mahasarakham University has since expanded rapidly in academic infrastructure, facilities, and relevant services. It became a comprehensive university, offering undergraduate and graduate degree programs in three academic clusters: social sciences; pure and applied sciences; and health sciences. In 1988, the Kham Riang Campus, known as the New Campus, was established, approximately seven kilometres from the Old Campus.

With 17 faculties and two colleges, the university has been recognized as one of Thailand's fastest growing. The total student enrolment has increased from thousands in its earlier years to about 40,000 students in 2016.

To extend its academic services to remote communities, MSU has had 15 academic service centers in the northeastern region, later reorganized into two centres in Nakhon Ratchasima province and Udon Thani province. As a regional education center, Maha Sarakham is known as the "Taxila (or Takshashila) (a Hindu and Buddhist centre of learning in ancient India) of Isan".

== Budget ==
The university was allocated 1,096 million baht in federal funding for fiscal year 2021, up from 1,034 million baht for FY2020.

== Campuses ==
The university has two campuses: the Old Campus in Maha Sarakham city center and the New Campus in the Kham Riang Sub-district of Kantharawichai District. The New Campus is now the administrative headquarters of the university.

=== Downtown campus ===
The original campus of Mahasarakham University, Downtown Campus, also known as the Old Campus (mor gao — Thai: ม.เก่า), is in the city center. It covers an area of 368 rai (58.9 ha; 145 acres). This campus hosts the Faculty of Education, Faculty of Tourism and Hotel Management, Faculty of Medicine, Faculty of Environment and Resource Studies, Faculty of Veterinary Medicine and Animal Science, Faculty of Cultural Sciences, and the Institute of Northeastern Arts and Culture.

=== Kham Riang campus ===
The Kham Riang Campus, known as the New Campus (mor mai — Thai: ม.ใหม่), is in the northwest of the city of Kham Riang District, seven kilometres from the city centre. This campus with a total area of 1,300 rai (210 ha; 510 acres) hosts new buildings and facilities to serve the education community and houses the main administrative center and most of the academic faculties, colleges, and research institutes of the university.

== Academic divisions ==
MSU has 18 faculties, two colleges, and nine research centres.

=== Faculties ===
==== Humanities and social sciences ====
- Faculty of Education (คณะศึกษาศาสตร์)
- Faculty of Humanities and Social Sciences (คณะมนุษยศาสตร์และสังคมศาสตร์)
- Mahasarakham Business School (คณะการบัญชีและการจัดการ)
- Faculty of Fine and Applied Arts (คณะศิลปกรรมศาสตร์)
- Faculty of Tourism and Hotel Management (คณะการท่องเที่ยวและการโรงแรม)
- Faculty of Cultural Science (คณะวัฒนธรรมศาสตร์)
- Faculty of Laws (คณะนิติศาสตร์)

==== Applied sciences and technologies ====
- Faculty of Architecture, Urban Design and Creative Arts (คณะสถาปัตยกรรมศาสตร์ ผังเมืองและนฤมิตศิลป์)
- Faculty of Engineering (วิศวกรรมศาสตร์))
- Faculty of Environment and Resource Studies (คณะสิ่งแวดล้อมและทรัพยากรศาสตร์)
- Faculty of Informatics (คณะวิทยาการสารสนเทศ)
- Faculty of Science (คณะวิทยาศาสตร์)
- Faculty of Technology (คณะเทคโนโลยี)

==== Health sciences ====
- Faculty of Medicine (คณะแพทยศาสตร์)
- Faculty of Nursing (คณะพยาบาลศาสตร์)
- Faculty of Pharmacy (คณะเภสัชศาสตร์)
- Faculty of Public Health (คณะสาธารณสุขศาสตร์)
- Faculty of Veterinary Sciences) (คณะสัตวแพทยศาสตร์)

=== Colleges ===
- College of Music (วิทยาลัยดุริยางคศิลป์)
- College of Politics and Governance (วิทยาลัยการเมืองการปกครอง)

=== Research institutes ===
- Walai Rukhavej Botanical Research Institute (สถาบันวิจัยวลัยรุกขเวช)
- Research Institute of Northeastern Art and Culture (สถาบันวิจัยศิลปะและวัฒนธรรมอีสาน)
- Sirindhorn Isan Information Center (ศูนย์สารนิเทศอีสานสิรินธร)
- Chalermprakiet Agricultural Technology Transfer Center (ศูนย์ถ่ายทอดเทคโนโลยีเกษตรกรรมเฉลิมพระเกียรติฯ)
- Mahasarakham University Museum (พิพิธภัณฑ์มหาวิทยาลัยมหาสารคาม)
- Natural Medicinal Mushroom Museum
- Northeastern Leaf-inscription Conservation Center
- Palaeontological Research and Education Center (ศูนย์วิจัยและการศึกษาบรรพชีวินวิทยา)
- Silk Innovation Center (ศูนย์นวัตกรรมไหม)

== See also ==
- List of colleges and universities
- Association of Southeast Asian Institutions of Higher Learning
- List of universities in Thailand
- List of schools of veterinary medicine in Thailand
- List of schools of landscape architecture in Asia Pacific
- List of pharmacy schools in Thailand
- List of university and college schools of music in Thailand
