= List of records of Thailand =

List of records of Thailand is an annotated list of Thai records organised by category.

== Buildings ==
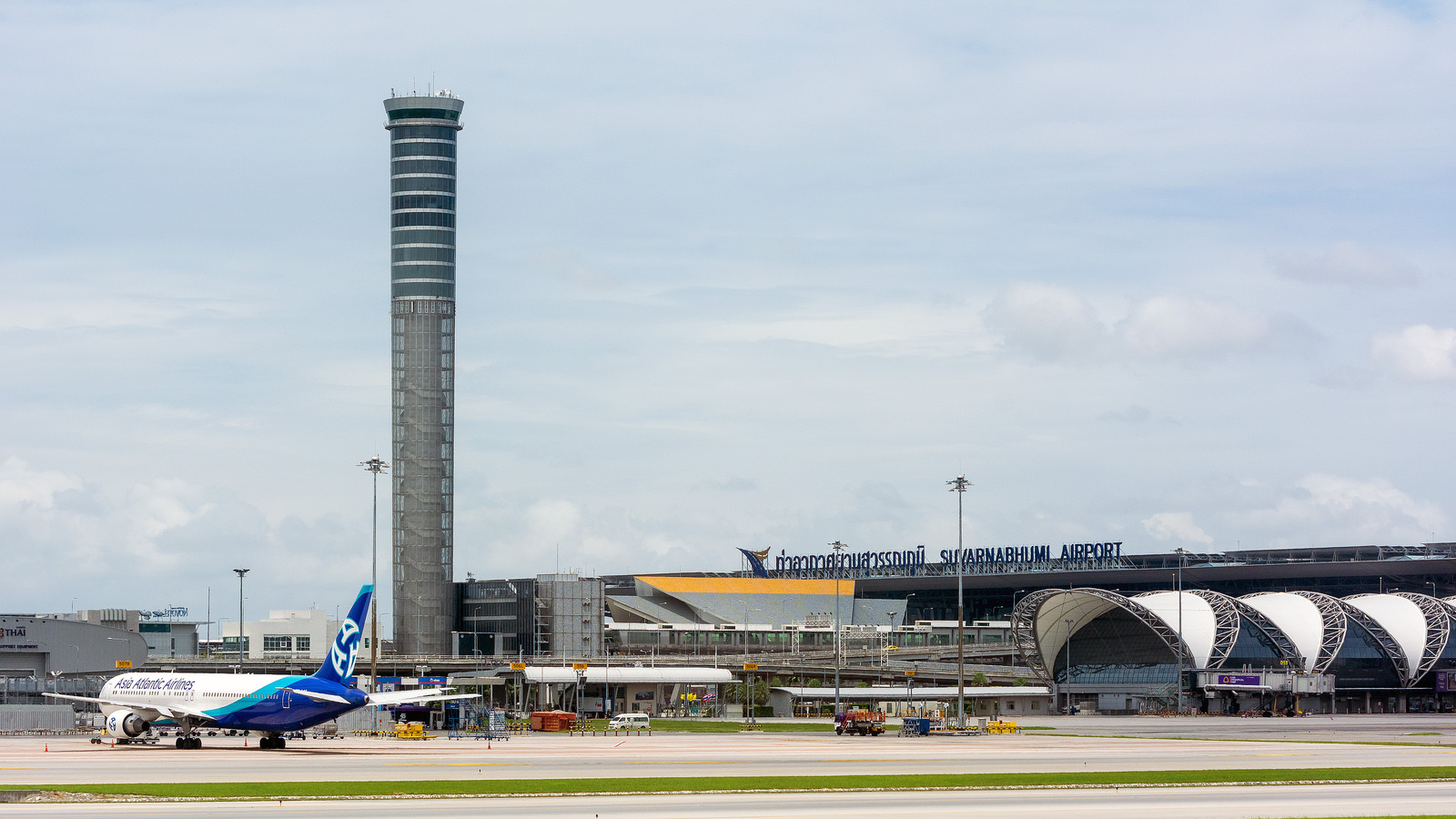
Suvarnabhumi Airport and its Control Tower

- The tallest structure: Magnolias Waterfront Residences Iconsiam, Khlong San, Bangkok, 318 m.
- The tallest stupa: Phra Pathommachedi, Nakhon Pathom, 120 m.
- The tallest statue: Great Buddha of Thailand, Ang Thong, 92m.
- The tallest hotel: Baiyoke Sky Hotel, Bangkok, 309 m.
- The tallest free-standing air traffic control tower: Suvarnabhumi Airport Control Tower, Samut Prakan, 132.2 m.

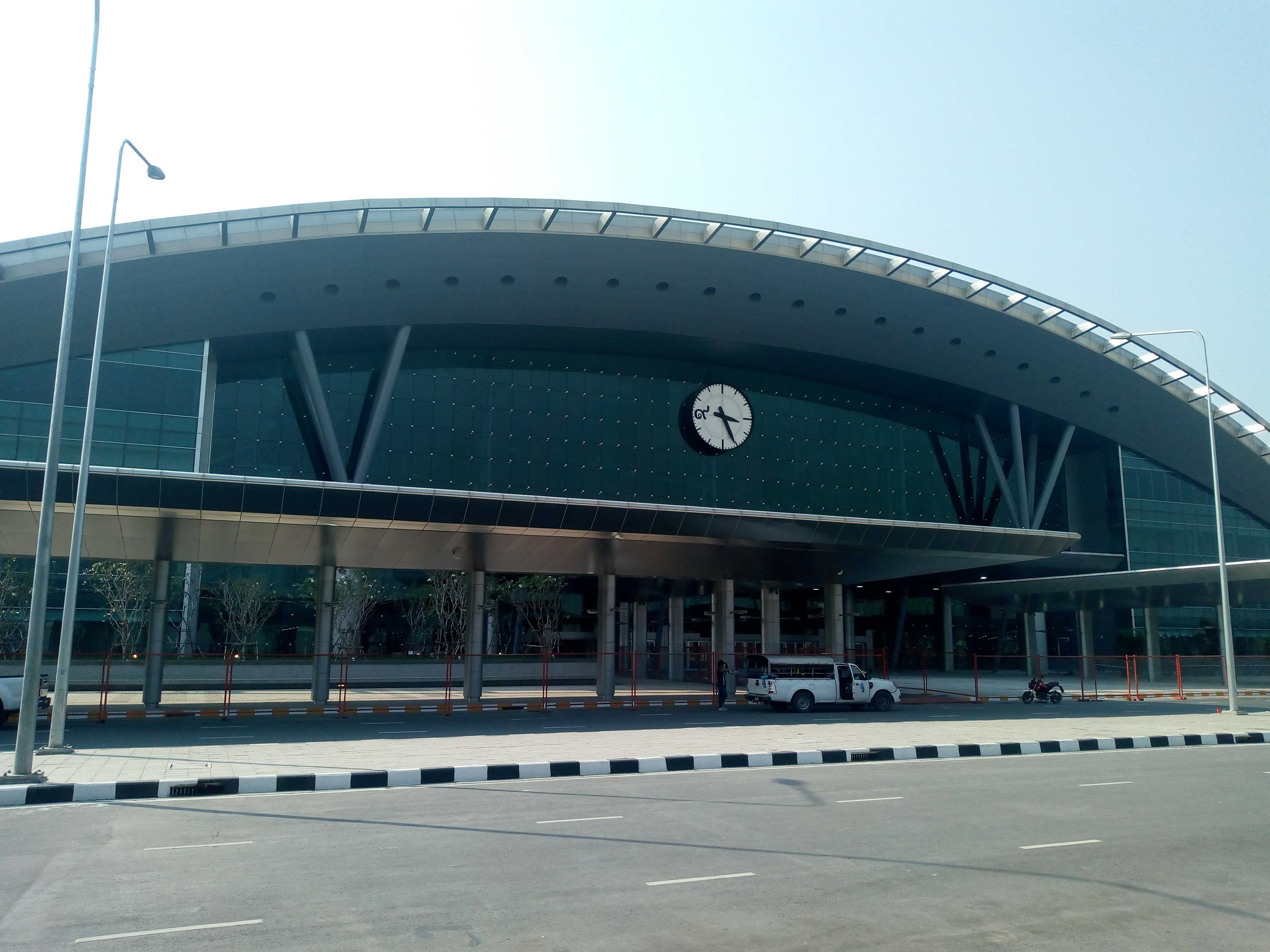
Krung Thep Aphiwat Central Terminal

- The largest train station: Krung Thep Aphiwat Central Terminal, Chatuchak, Bangkok, 274,192 m^{2}, 26 platforms, 600 meters long.
- The largest single-building airport terminal: Suvarnabhumi Airport, Samut Prakan, 563,000 m^{2}

== Finance ==
- The richest person in Thailand: Chearavanont Family, 966,400 Million Baht.
- The largest corporation in Thailand: PTT Public Company Limited, Total assets: 2,823,897 million Baht (Q2 2021)
- The oldest bank in Thailand: Siam Commercial Bank, Bangkok, 1907

== Geography ==
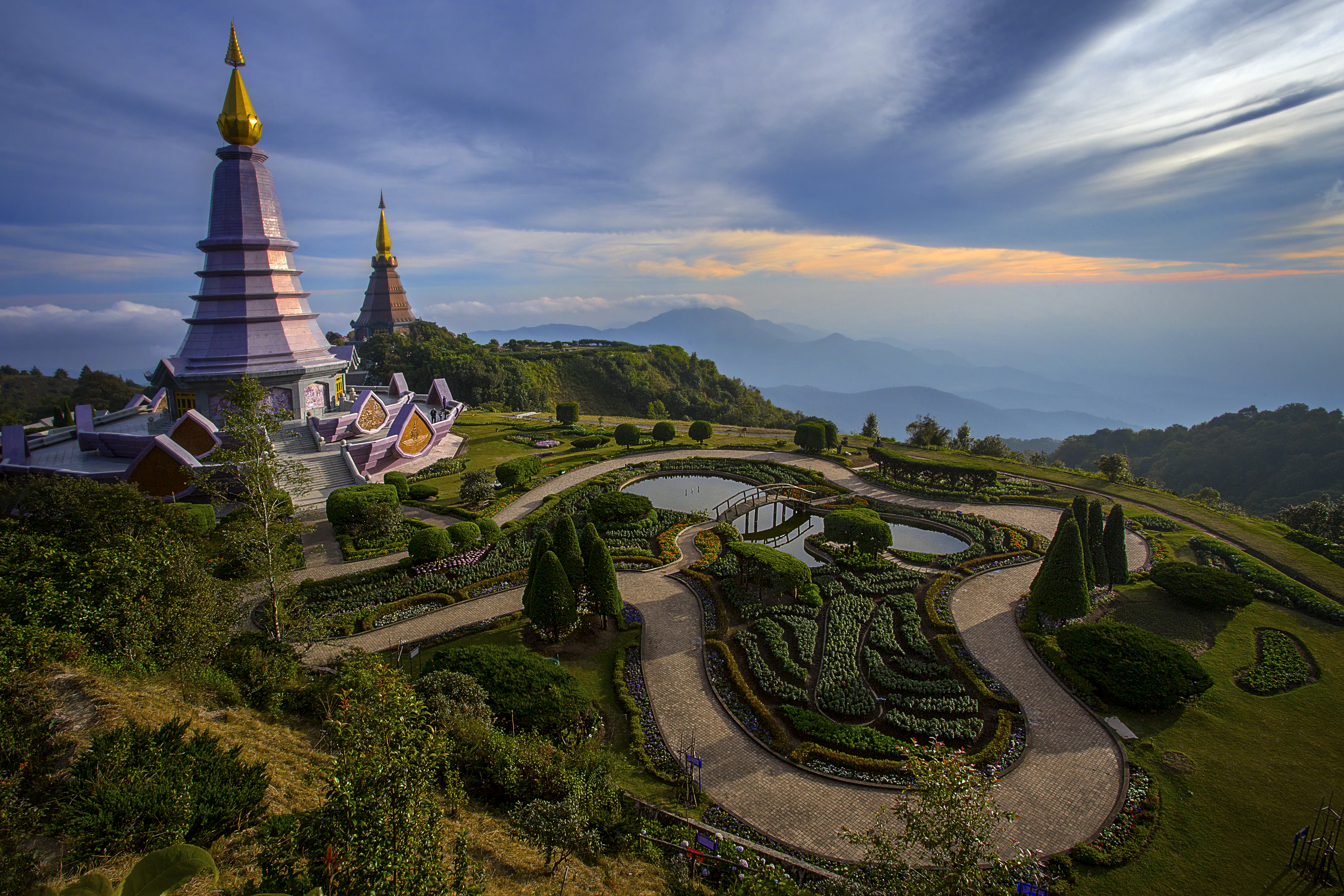
Doi Inthanon, the tallest mountain in Thailand

- The tallest mountain: Doi Inthanon, Chom Thong, Chiang Mai, 2,565 m.

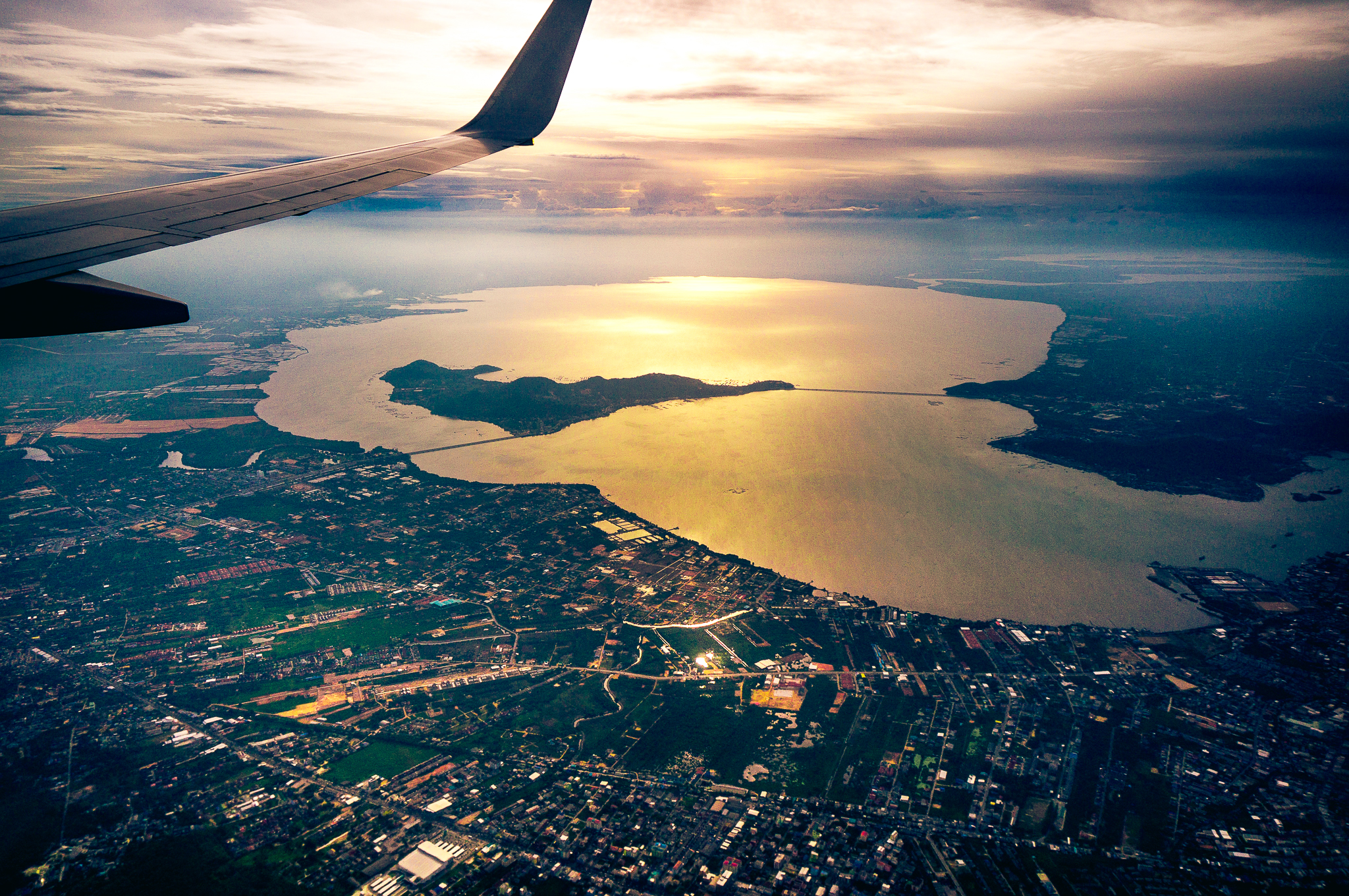
Songkla Lake, the largest lake in Thailand

- The largest lake: Songkhla Lake, Songkhla and Phattalung, 1,040 km^{2}
- The largest island: Phuket Island, Phuket, 543 km^{2}
- The longest river: Mekong River, Isan, 4,350 km.

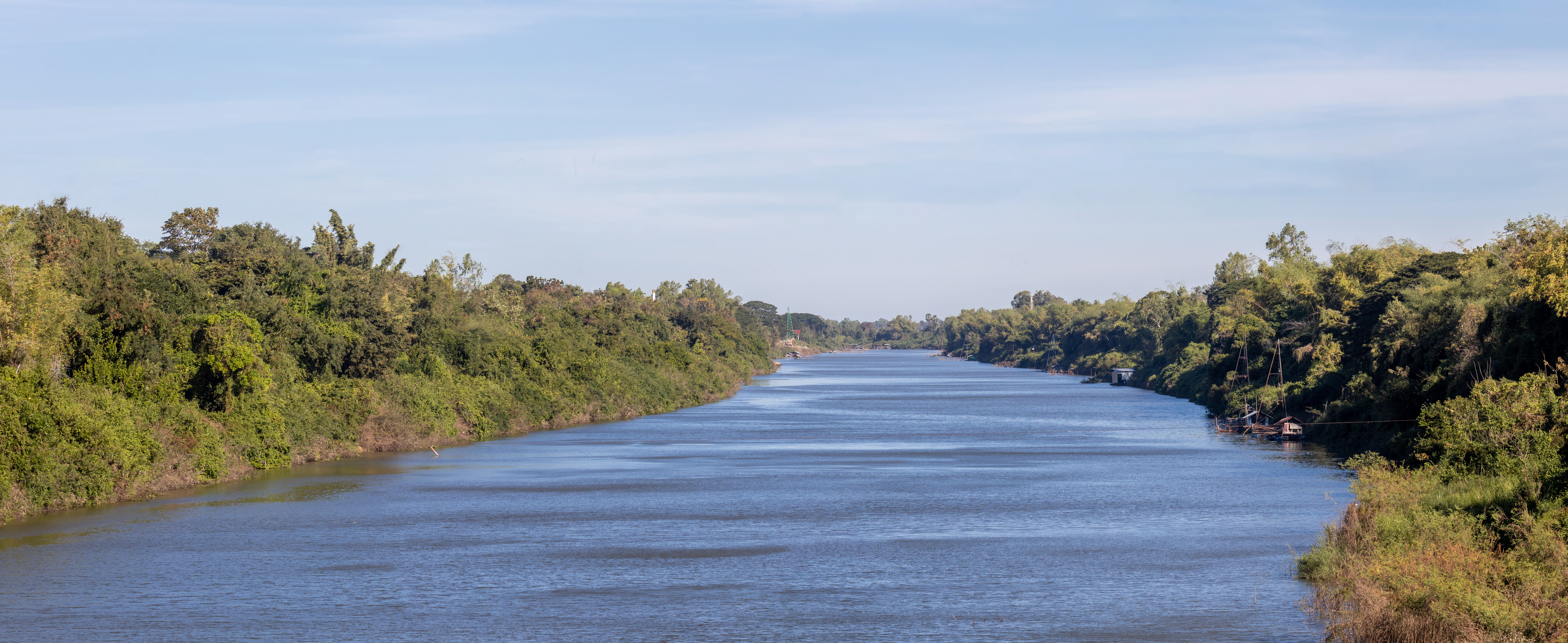
Chi river, the longest river flowing wholly within Thailand

- The longest river flowing wholly within Thailand: Chi River, Central Isan, 765 km.
- The longest river in Southern Thailand: Tapi River, Surat Thani and Nakhon Si Thammarat, 230 km.

== Political entities ==
- The largest province: Nakhon Ratchasima, 20,736 km^{2}
- The smallest province: Samut Songkhram, 417 km^{2}
- The largest district by area: Umphang District, Tak, 4,325 km^{2}
- Province-level entity with the most districts : Nakhon Ratchasima, 32 Districts.
- Province-level entity with the most subdistricts: Nakhon Ratchasima, 287 Subdistricts.
- Province-level entity with the longest shoreline: Prachuap Khiri Kan: 251 km.
- Latest province-level entity: Bueng Kan, established in 2011.
- Latest district-level entity: Galyani Vadhana District, Chiang mai, established in 2009.

== Politics and government ==
- The longest reigning monarch: King Bhumibol Adulyadej, 70 years.
- The longest-serving prime minister: Field Marshal Plaek Pibulsongkhram, 14 years, 11 months, and 18 days.
- The shortest-serving prime minister: Tawee Boonyaket, 18 days.
- The youngest prime minister to ever occupy office: Seni Pramoj, 40 years old.
- The oldest political party: Democrat Party: founded in 1946.

== Transportation ==
- The longest railway line: Southern Line, 1,144.29 km.
- The longest highway: Highway 4 (Phet Kasem Road), Central and Southern Thailand, 1,274 km.
- The longest concrete bridge: Tinsulanond Bridge, Songkla, 2.6 km.

== Others ==
- Highest temperature recorded: 45.4 °C, Tak, 15 April 2023
- Lowest temperature recorded: -1.4 °C, Sakon Nakhon, 2 Jan 1974
- The deadliest tsunami: 2004 Indian Ocean tsunami, 4,812 confirmed deaths, 8,457 injuries, and 4,499 missing.

== See also ==
- List of firsts in Thailand
