= Bang Pakok =

Bang Pakok บางปะกอก
- Khwaeng
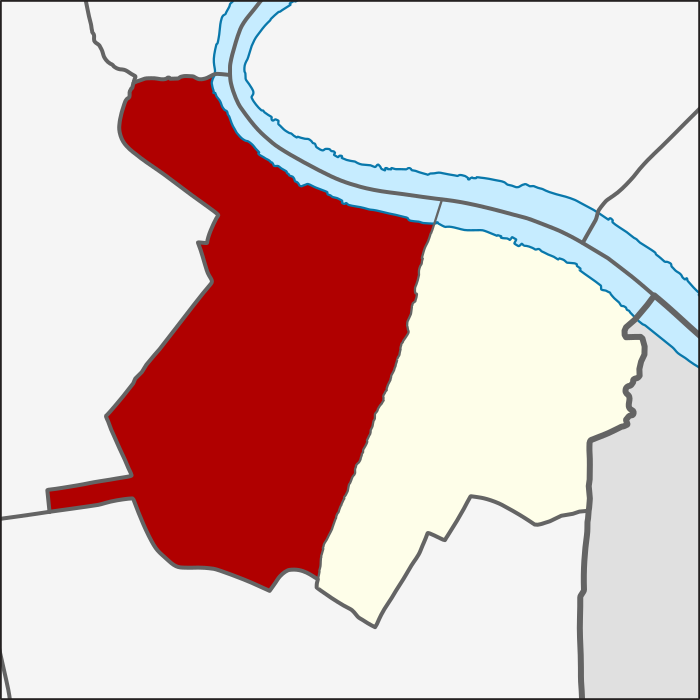
- Location in Rat Burana District
- Country: Thailand
- Province: Bangkok
- Khet: Rat Burana

Area
  - Total: 9.066 km^{2} (3.500 sq mi)

Population (2020)
  - Total: 47,638
- Time zone: UTC+7 (ICT)
- Postal code: 10140
- TIS 1099: 102402

Bang Pakok (Thai: บางปะกอก, pronounced [bāːŋ pā.kɔ̀ːk]) is a khwaeng (subdistrict) of Rat Burana District, in Bangkok, Thailand. In 2020, it had a total population of 47,638 people.
