= King Mongkut's University of Technology North Bangkok =

University in Bangkok, Thailand

Coordinates: 13°49′08″N 100°30′51″E

- มหาวิทยาลัยเทคโนโลยีพระจอมเกล้าพระนครเหนือ
- Seal of the Great Crown of Victory
- Former names: North Bangkok Technical School (1959–1964); North Bangkok Technical College (1964–1971); King Mongkut's Institute of Technology North Bangkok Campus (1971-1985); King Mongkut's Institute of Technology North Bangkok (1985-2008)
- Motto: Thai: พัฒนาคน พัฒนาวิทยาศาสตร์และเทคโนโลยี
- Motto in English: "To foster innovation in Science and Technology through the development of people."
- Type: Autonomous public university
- Established: 1959
- Accreditation: ABET
- Affiliations: ASAIHL
- Budget: ฿1,970,812,300 (FY2023)
- President: Prof. Dr. Suchart Siengchin
- Royal conferrer: Maha Chakri Sirindhorn, Princess Royal of Thailand on behalf of the King
- Total staff: 2,709 (2022)
- Students: 27,846 (First term, 2022)
- Undergraduates: 21,611
- Postgraduates: 3,164
- Doctoral students: 763
- Other students: Vocational certificate, 1,592
- Location: Bang Sue, Bangkok, Thailand
- Campus: Bangkok 34.79 acres (14.08 ha); Prachinburi 715.22 acres (289.44 ha); Rayong 39 acres (16 ha); Multiple sites
- Colours: Vermilion; Orange; Black
- Website: www.kmutnb.ac.th/

King Mongkut's University of Technology North Bangkok (Abrv: KMUTNB Thai: มจพ.; Thai: มหาวิทยาลัยเทคโนโลยีพระจอมเกล้าพระนครเหนือ, RTGS: Maha Witthayalai Teknoloyi Phra Jom Khlao Phra Nakhon Nuea), colloquially known as Phra Nakhon Nuea (Thai: พระนครเหนือ) is a public technology university in Thailand.

KMUTNB was jointly founded by the Royal Thai Government and the Federal Republic of Germany as the North Bangkok Technical School in 1959; colloquially known as Thai-German Technical School. In 1964, the school was upgraded to "Thai-German Technical College" before becoming King Mongkut's Institute of Technology North Bangkok Campus in 1971. Later in 1986, King Mongkut's Institute of Technology separated into three autonomous universities and the North Bangkok campus became King Mongkut's Institute of Technology North Bangkok. In 1995, KMUTNB extended its educational obligations to the rural areas, leading to the creation of the Prachinburi campus in Prachinburi province. Later in 2007, King Mongkut's Institute of Technology North Bangkok was renamed "King Mongkut's University of Technology North Bangkok " and became an autonomous state university.

Presently, the university has three campuses located in Bangkok, Rayong and Prachinburi provinces. It has 13 faculties, 2 colleges and 2 graduate schools. Degrees offered range from vocational certificate to doctorates.

== History ==
=== Thai-German Technical School ===
On 9 October 1956, the Royal Thai Government and the government of the Federal Republic of Germany signed a memorandum of understanding regarding economic and academic cooperation. This led to the signing of another MOU on 16 March 1959 which laid out the creation of a technical school in Thailand with cooperation from both countries. The German Government would assist with the entire procurement process of machinery and tools which would be used in teaching various mechanic-related subjects and sending instructors to teach the students. The Thai Government would procure land, construct the school buildings and hire a number of Thai teachers to teach alongside the German teachers. The school first opened for business on 18 May 1959. It was like any other Thai school in terms of administration, as the German government was only involved in an advisory capacity. The MOU which led to the establishment of the school first lasted for three years, after the expiration of which the MOU was extended for another two years.

The education offered was divided into two types, first being day school and the second was evening supplementary school, of which most students were adults who had to work during the day and come to school during the evening. Day school can be further divided into two programs, being basic high vocational certificate education and advanced high vocational certificate education.

In 1963, intake for high vocational certificate students was 50 people for three years from then on. There are 2- and 3-year courses. The 2-year course takes students who have finished the first year from various vocational schools, while the 3-year course takes students who have finished vocational certificate education. After three years since opening, the school only took in students who graduated from upper secondary education and shut off intake from other vocational schools. Advanced high vocational certificate is for students who graduated from the basic course and then studies further for two years, with the education consisting mostly of work experience at factories or government agencies with school approval. However, students have to come into school once a week for theory classes as well.

For evening supplementary school, there are short 180-hour or 300 hour courses certified by the Department of Vocational Education which are offered for engine technicians, welding technicians, radio technicians and drafting technicians. Some courses require applicants to have completed upper secondary education such as electrical technicians, engine technicians and radio technicians, For other departments, an educational qualification is not required.

The German government provided the school with 7 million baht worth of duty-exempt equipment. In addition, instructors from Germany have been sent to the school with their salaries being paid by the German government. However, the Royal Thai Government helped out the instructors by paying their utility bills and exempted duties on the personal effects which they've brought to Thailand. The installation of machinery and equipment in the school's workshops including electrical wiring and piping for water, pressurised air and gas was all done by the first 50 students who worked alongside the German and Thai instructors.

== Campuses ==
King Mongkut's University of Technology North Bangkok

- Bangkok campus occupies 14.08 hectares with 43 buildings.
- Prachinburi campus occupies 197.41 hectares with 22 buildings.
- Rayong campus occupies 16 hectares with 9 buildings.

== Faculties ==
- Bangkok
- Prachinburi
- Rayong

== Partner institutions ==
=== Germany ===
- Rosenheim University of Applied Sciences
- Bochum University of Applied Sciences
- RWTH Aachen University
- Hochschule Bremerhaven University of Applied Sciences
- Ilmenau University of Technology

=== France ===
- University of Lorraine
- University of Burgundy
- National Polytechnic Institute of Toulouse
- Toulouse III - Paul Sabatier University

=== Malaysia ===
- Universiti Tunku Abdul Rahman
- Multimedia University
- Universiti Tunku Abdul Rahman

=== Japan ===
- Japan Science and Technology Agency
- University of Electro-Communications
- Osaka University
- Kyushu Institute of Technology
- Tokyo City University
- Nagaoka University of Technology
