= Rama IX Bridge =

Rama IX Bridge สะพานพระราม ๙
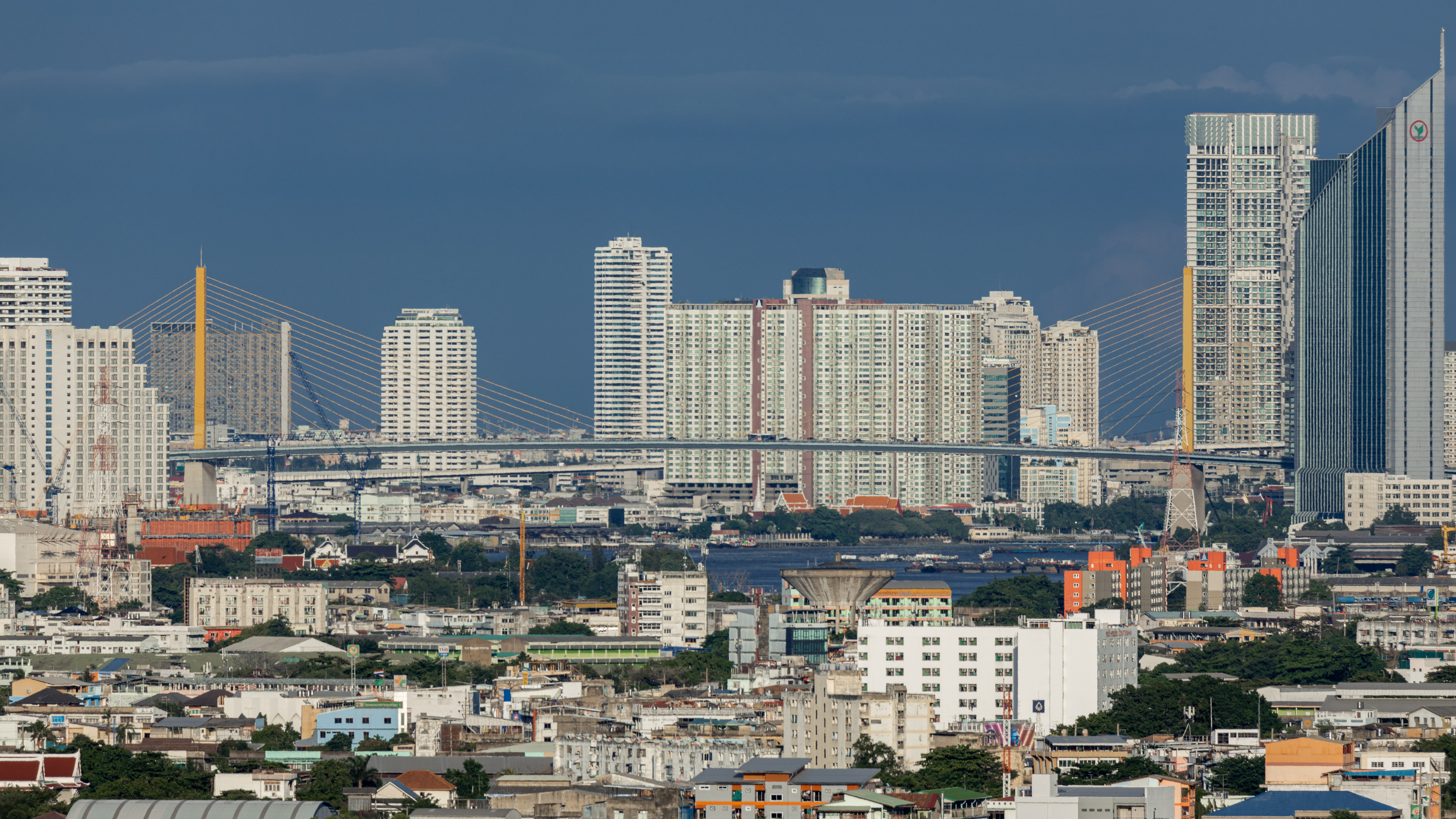
- Coordinates: 13.682058°N 100.519001°E
- Carries: Chaloem Maha Nakhon Expressway
- Crosses: Chao Phraya River
- Locale: Bangkok, Thailand

Characteristics
- Design: cable-stayed
- Total length: 781.20 m
- Width: 33 m
- Height: 87 m
- Longest span: 450 m
- Clearance below: 41 m
- No. of lanes: 6

History
- Construction start: 1 October 1984
- Opened: 5 December 1987

Rama IX Bridge (Thai: สะพานพระราม ๙, RTGS: Saphan Phra Ram Kao, pronounced [sā.pʰāːn pʰráʔ rāːm kâːw]) is a bridge in Bangkok, Thailand over the Chao Phraya River. It connects the Yan Nawa District to Rat Burana District as a part of the Tha Ruea – Dao Khanong Section of Chaloem Maha Nakhon Expressway.

The bridge was named in the honor of King Bhumibol Adulyadej's 60th birthday. The opening date coincided with the king's birthday, with a million people walking over it. It was the first cable-stayed bridge in Thailand and had the second-longest cable-stayed span in the world when it opened in 1987.

The original colour scheme, with white pylons and black cables, was replaced with an all yellow scheme representing the king in 2006.

Thotsamarachan Bridge is a new eight-lane double-pylon cable-stayed bridge. As it is intended to relieve traffic congestion on the existing Rama IX Bridge, it runs parallel to the latter. It's planned to become a part of the Rama III-Dao Khanong-Western Bangkok Outer Ring Road expressway project. The new bridge's official opening was on 14 December 2024. Afterwards it's planned that the Rama IX bridge be closed for an extensive renovation, which includes a sensor system for added safety.

== Bridge structure ==
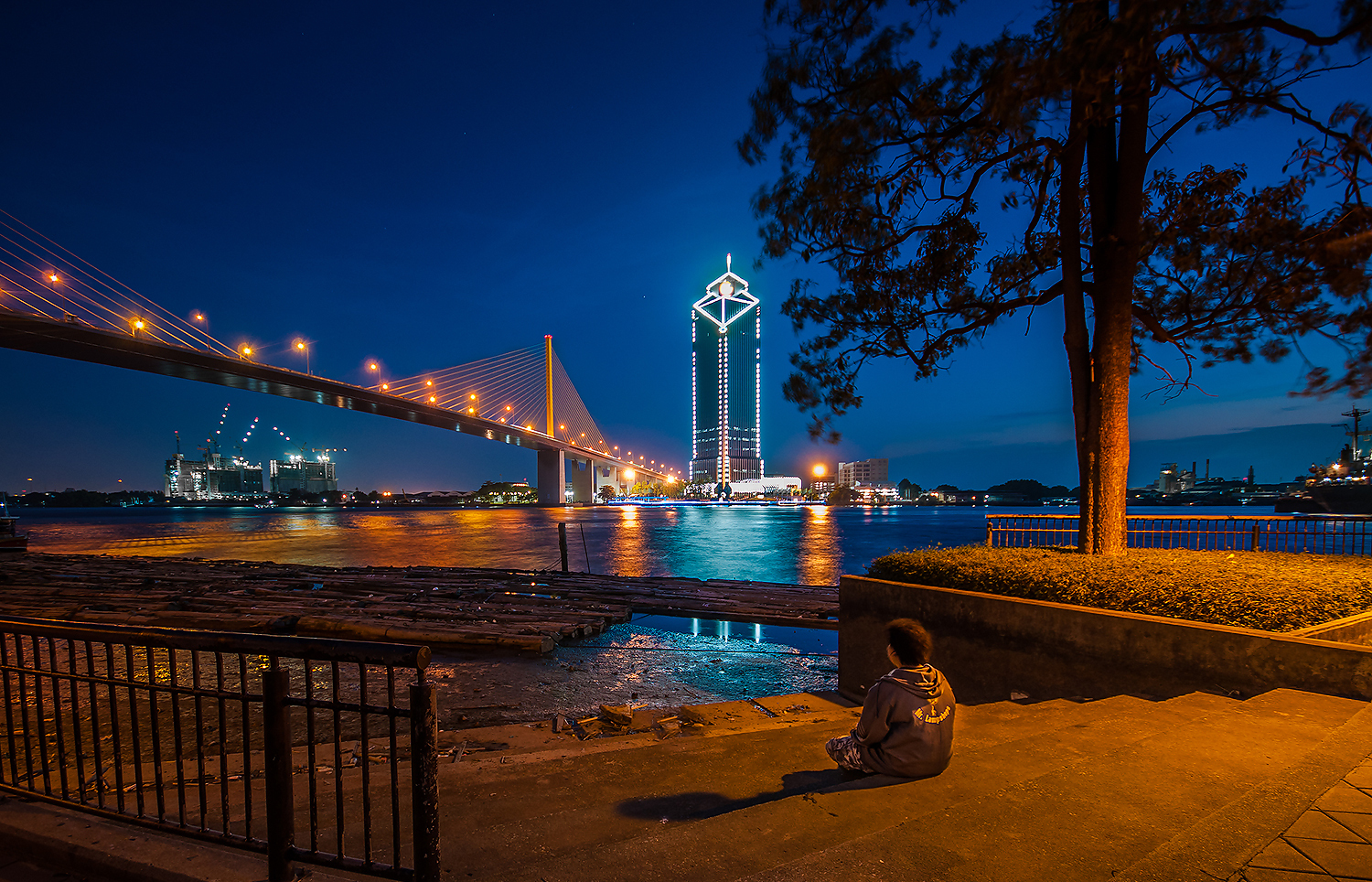
View of Rama IX Bridge

The steel superstructure includes the bridge, rigged mast, and cable. The main span of the bridge, which is stretched between two poles, has a length of 450 meters. The main span is a trapezoid 33 meters wide. The bridge has a walkway along its side. The bridge has two main pylons 3 meters × 4.50 meters. This serves to hold the tension of the cable and weight into the pylon pier. The 121 – 167 mm diameter cables consist of many small wires wound together. The cables vary in length from 50 to 223 meters can absorb the tension for 1,500–3,000 tons.

== Approach viaducts ==
The gradually sloping viaducts on each side of the river are dual-double-T, post-tensioned, concrete structures with thirteen 50-metre double spans on each bank cast in-situ with a steel travelling shutter, up to 40 metres above the ground for sufficient shipping clearance.

The senior engineer Peter Hines overcame a major construction problem: On releasing the 950-ton travelling shuttering, the suction of the shutters could pull the new concrete off. I suggested that as we were only carrying the dead load at the time, we should stress the work to about 2/3rds the finally required stress so that the material would not “hog” (rise in the middle) so much – this worked well. After removing the shuttering, we applied the full stress.

== See also ==
- King Bhumibol Adulyadej – King of Thailand from 1946 to 2016
