= Thai Smile Bus =

Major private bus operator in Bangkok, Thailand

Thai Smile Bus (TSB)

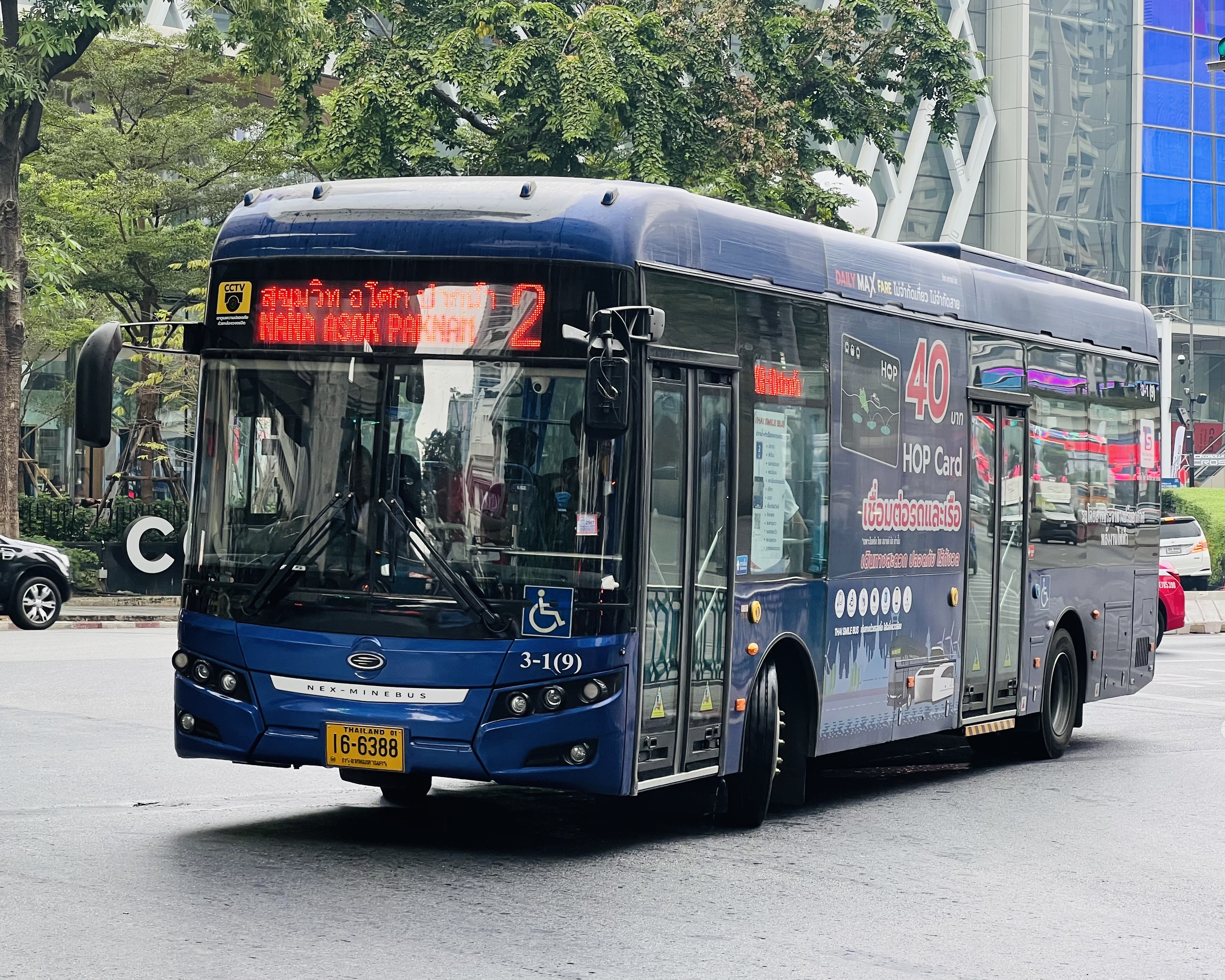

Overview
- Native name: ไทยสมายล์บัส
- Owner: Ministry of Transport
- Transit type: Public transit buses within the Greater Bangkok area
- Number of lines: 125 routes
- Daily ridership: 380,000
- Key people: Kulpornphat Wongmajarapinya
- Website: thaismilegroup.com

Thai Smile Bus (Thai: บริษัทไทยสมายล์บัสจำกัด) is a major private bus operator in Bangkok and its surrounding provinces that provides bus service under a concession issued by the Thai Ministry of Transport.

Since it launched service in 2022, Thai Smile Bus has progressively taken over bus routes in the Bangkok Metropolitan Region from other providers, including the public operator, Bangkok Mass Transit Authority. Fares start from 10 baht, with the entire fleet consisting of EV buses, aimed at reducing carbon emissions. As of 2025, TSB runs 123 bus routes in Bangkok and the surrounding provinces as part of a plan to reform bus operations in and around Bangkok.

The company also operates electric ferries along the Chao Phraya River and Khlong Saen Saeb in Bangkok branded as Thai Smile Boat.

== History ==
The company was registered on 9 June 2020 with Kulpornphat Wongmajarapinya as CEO and Chairwoman, who retains a 51% majority ownership stake. The remaining 49% of shares are held by Beyond Securities (BYD).

Thai Smile Bus received a concession from the Department of Transport to operate 71 bus routes, with an additional 52 routes announced in 2023. Thai Smile Bus also announced it would expand its fleet of electric vehicles by 1,850 from 1,250 buses to a total of 3,100 buses.

As part of Bangkok Mass Transit Authority's bus reform plan to allow private operators to take over existing BMTA routes, TSB came to inherit a fleet of a fleet of approximately 350 diesel buses. By January 2024, however, the company decommissioned all of its NGV buses, running a fleet of 100% electric vehicles. Later that year, TSB began operating 24-hour services on 13 routes to meet growing demand for all-day service with 1 hour frequencies between 12:00 midnight and 5:00 am. This move was met with some public pushback due to the fact that the decommissioning of diesel buses included pulling non-air conditioned buses out of service. Non-air conditioned buses charged lower fares (starting from 8 THB) while TSB fares begin at 15 THB and were therefore more affordable to the public. In response, TSB began operating electric non-air-conditioned buses or "hot buses" for a flat fare of 10 THB on some routes.

== Routes ==
As of 2025, TSB operates a total of 123 bus routes throughout the Bangkok Metropolitan Region. Most route numbers are identified using a Z-NN format, with the first number representing the zone to which the bus route belongs. The second number designates the actual route.

In the case where TSB inherited routes from BMTA, buses also display the old BMTA number in parentheses. Notably, TSB has come to operate Route 8, a bus line notorious for a high incidence of reckless driving. Upon its transfer to TSB, it has been renumbered 2-38.

=== Now service is available on 125 routes ===
- Route 1-1 (29): Bang Khen <> Hua Lamphong via Vibhavadi Rangsit Road and Rama VI Road
- Route 1-2E (34E): Rangsit <> Hua Lamphong via Ram Intra Road with Chalong Rat Expressway
- Route 1-3 (34): Bang Khen <> Hua Lamphong via Phahonyothin Road
- Route 1-4 (39): Bang Khen <> Thammasat University Rangsit Campuses
- Route 1-5 (39): Rangsit <> Victory Monument via Phahonyothin Road
- Route 1-6 (39): Pakkred Pier <> Mo Chit 2 Bus Terminal via Vibhavadi Rangsit Road
- Route 1-9E: Thammasat University Rangsit Campuses <> Thammasat University Thaprachan Campuses via Udon Ratthaya Expressway and Si Rat Expressway
- Route 1-13 (126): Chaeng Watthana Government Complex <> Khlong Tan
- Route 1-15 (150): Pakkred Pier <> Min Buri
- Route 1-17 (187): Rangsit 3th Khlong <> Victory Monument via Vibhavadi Rangsit Road
- Route 1-18E (504): Rangsit <> Bang Rak via Don Mueang Tollway
- Route 1-23 (524): Lak Si Station <> New Southern Bus Terminal
- Route 1-24E (538): Rajamangala University of Technology Thanyaburi <> Priest Hospital (Bangkok) via Don Mueang Tollway
- Route 1-31: Chaeng Watthana Government Complex <> 5th Khlong Luang
- Route 1-32E: Bang Khen <> Talat Phlu BTS station with Chalong Rat Expressway and Si Rat Expressway
- Route 1-33: Bang Khen <> Bang Sue Station
- Route 1-37 (27): Min Buri <> Victory Monument
- Route 1-39 (71): Suan Siam <> Khlong Toei
- Route 1-41 (92): Happy Land <> Kheha Romklao
- Route 1-44 (113): Min Buri <> Hua Lamphong
- Route 1-45 (115): Suan Siam <> Bang Rak
- Route 1-47 (143): Namkrai Industrial Estate <> Min Buri
- Route 1-49 (152): King Mongkut's Institute of Technology Ladkrabang <> Happy Land
- Route 1-49 (152): Min Buri <> Hathairaj Road With Running in a circle route.
- Route 1-56 (517): King Mongkut's Institute of Technology Ladkrabang <> Victory Monument
- Route 1-58 (525): Suan Siam <> 12th Khlong Lamlukka
- Route 1-59 (526): Suan Siam <> Euea-A-Thorn Sangkhasantisuk Village
- Route 1-61: Euea-A-Thorn Sangkhasantisuk Village <> Min Buri
- Route 1-62: Min Buri <> Ministry of Commerce
- Route 1-63 (888): Pattavikorn Market <> Rama VIII Bridge
- Route 1-71: Min Buri <> Ladkrabang Industrial Estate With Running in a circle route.
- Route 1-76: Buakhao Village <> Min Buri With Running in a circle route.
- Route 1-77: Min Buri <> Ekkamai Bus Terminal
- Route 2-3 (18): Tha It Market <> Victory Monument
- Route 2-4 (30): Wat Paknam (Nonthaburi) <> Old Southern Bus Terminal (Pinklao)
- Route 2-8 (51): Wat Prang Luang <> Bang Khen
- Route 2-11 (64): Ministry of Public Health <> Sanam Luang
- Route 2-13 (69): Tha It Market <> Ramkhamhaeng University
- Route 2-15 (97): Ministry of Public Health <> Priest Hospital (Bangkok)
- Route 2-16 (104): Pakkred Pier <> Mo Chit 2 Bus Terminal via Phahonyothin Road
- Route 2-17: Bang Sue Station <> Kasetsart University With Running in a circle route.
- Route 2-18E (69E): Tha It Market <> Ramkhamhaeng University with Si Rat Expressway
- Route 2-19 (127): Bang Bua Thong Market <> Bang Lam Phu (Wat Bowonniwet Vihara)
- Route 2-22 (175): Nonthaburi Pier <> Thanon Tok
- Route 2-26 (545): Nonthaburi Pier <> Phatthanakan
- Route 2-27 (210): Muang Thong Thani <> Bang Wa Station It's Route Support for FULL SENSE PUBG
- Route 2-34: Sam Sen railway station <> Din Daeng With Running in a circle route.
- Route 2-35 (110): 3th Prachaniwet <> The Wet
- Route 2-38 (8): Happyland <> Phutthayotfa Bridge Pier
- Route 2-42 (44): Kheha Khlong Chan <> Tha Tien
- Route 2-48 (122): Happyland <> Mo Chit 2 Bus Terminal
- Route 3-1 (2): Pak Nam <> Phutthayotfa Bridge Pier
- Route 3-2E (2E): Pu Chao Saming Phrai <> Phutthayotfa Bridge Pier with Chaloem Maha Nakhon Expressway
- Route 3-3 (11): Suan Luang Rama IX <> National Stadium
- Route 3-6 (25): Pathumkongka School Samut Prakan <> Ekkamai Bus Terminal
- Route 3-8 (38): Ramkhamhaeng University Bang Na Campuses <> Victory Monument
- Route 3-11 (48): Ramkhamhaeng University Bang Na Campuses <> Tha Chang Pier
- Route 3-13 (507): Samrong <> New Southern Bus Terminal
- Route 3-14 (132): Kheha Bang Phli <> Udom Suk BTS station
- Route 3-15 (133): Kheha Bang Phli <> Ekkamai BTS station
- Route 3-23E (513): Samrong <> Chaeng Watthana Government Complex with Chalong Rat Expressway
- Route 3-25E (552): Pak Nam <> Ladkrabang Industrial Estate with Burapha Withi Expressway
- Route 3-26E: Chakri Naruebodindra Medical Institute <> Ramathibodi Hospital with Si Rat Expressway
- Route 3-27: Pu Chao Saming Phrai <> Suan Siam via Srinagarindra Road
- Route 3-32: Samrong <> Suan Siam
- Route 3-34: Bang Na <> Ladkrabang Industrial Estate
- Route 3-35 (1): Central Rama III <> Tha Tien
- Route 3-36 (4): Khlong Toei Pier <> Phasi Charoen Pier
- Route 3-37 (12): Thailand Cultural Centre <> Sanam Chai MRT station
- Route 3-39 (14): Thanon Tok <> Si Yan
- Route 3-44: Khlong Toei Pier <> Victory Monument
- Route 3-45 (77): Central Rama III <> Mo Chit 2 Bus Terminal
- Route 3-52: Central Rama III <> Hua Lamphong With Running in a circle route.
- Route 3-53: Hua Mak station <> Sao Chingcha
- Route 3-54: Phasi Charoen Pier <> Victory Monument
- Route 3-55: Khlong Toei Pier <> Rama VII Bridge
- Route 34: Rangsit <> Hua Lamphong
- Route 39: Talaad Thai Market <> Victory Monument
- Route 4-1 (6): Phra Pradaeng Pier <> Bang Lam Phu (Wat Bowonniwet Vihara) via Charoen Nakhon Road
- Route 4-3 (17): Big C Phra Pradaeng (Big C Suksawat) <> Victory Monument
- Route 4-8 (35): Kheha Thonburi <> Bang Lam Phu (Wat Bowonniwet Vihara)
- Route 4-10 (42): Sao Chingcha <> Tha Phra With Running in a circle route.
- Route 4-13 (75): Phutthabucha <> Hua Lamphong
- Route 4-15 (82): Phra Pradaeng Pier <> Banglamphu via Suk Sawat Road
- Route 4-16 (85): Phra Pradaeng <> Thon Buri railway station
- Route 4-17 (88): KMUTT Bang Khun Thien Campuses <> Talat Phlu BTS station
- Route 4-21 (120): Samut Sakhon <> Yaek Bang Khae
- Route 4-23E (140): Samae Dam <> Victory Monument with Chaloem Maha Nakhon Expressway
- Route 4-25 (147): Kheha Thonburi <> Bang Wa Station With Running in a circle route.
- Route 4-26 (167): Kheha Thonburi <> Lumphini MRT station
- Route 4-27E (173): Bang Khun Thian <> Happyland with Chaloem Maha Nakhon Expressway and Chalong Rat Expressway
- Route 4-28 (529): Samae Dam <> Victory Monument
- Route 4-29E (529E): Samae Dam <> Mo Chit 2 Bus Terminal with Chaloem Maha Nakhon Expressway
- Route 4-34: Samae Dam <> Phra Pradaeng With Running in a circle route.
- Route 4-36 (7): Suksanaree School <> Hua Lamphong
- Route 4-37 (9): Kanlapaphruek Road <> Sam Sen railway station
- Route 4-38 (28): New Southern Bus Terminal <> Chandrakasem Rajabhat University
- Route 4-39 (40): New Southern Bus Terminal <> Ekkamai Bus Terminal
- Route 4-40 (56): Krung Thon Bridge <> Bang Lam Phu (Wat Bowonniwet Vihara) With Running in a circle route.
- Route 4-41 (57): Taling Chan <> Iconsiam With Running in a circle route.
- Route 4-44 (80A): Wapawor 11 Village <> Suan Luang Rama VIII
- Route 4-45 (81): 5th Phutthamonthon (Sai 5) <> Tha Tien
- Route 4-46 (84): Wat Rai Khing <> BTS Krung Thon Buri
- Route 4-47 (89): New Southern Bus Terminal <> Rajamangala University of Technology Krungthep
- Route 4-49 (170): Save E Market (Borommaratchachonnani) <> Mo Chit 2 Bus Terminal
- Route 4-50 (123): Om Yai (Nakhon Pathom) <> Sanam Luang
- Route 4-51 (124): Salaya <> Sanam Luang
- Route 4-52 (146): New Southern Bus Terminal <> Tha Phra With Running in a circle route.
- Route 4-53 (149): Save E Market (Borommaratchachonnani) <> Ekkamai Bus Terminal
- Route 4-54E (157): Om Yai (Nakhon Pathom) <> Victory Monument with Prachim Ratthaya Expressway
- Route 4-55 (163): Salaya <> National Stadium
- Route 4-56 (165): Salathammasop (Borommaratchachonnani) <> BTS Krung Thon Buri
- Route 4-61 (515): Central Salaya <> Victory Monument
- Route 4-67: Salaya railway station <> Ministry of Commerce
- Route 4-68: Suan Phak <> Thanon Tok
- Route S2 (554): Rangsit <> Suvannabhumi International Airport via Ram Intra Road
- Route S3 (559): Rangsit <> Suvannabhumi International Airport via Rangsit-Nakhon Nayok Road and Pass Suan Siam
- Route S4 (549): Min Buri <> Suvannabhumi International Airport
- Route S5 (550): Happyland <> Suvannabhumi International Airport
- Route S6 (555): Mo Chit 2 Bus Terminal <> Suvannabhumi International Airport
- Route S6A (555A): Don Mueang International Airport <> Suvannabhumi International Airport
- Route S7 (558): Kheha Thonburi <> Suvannabhumi International Airport

=== Overnight service is available on 13 routes ===
- Route 1-3 (34): Bang Khen <> Hua Lamphong via Phahonyothin Road
- Route 1-37 (27): Min Buri <> Victory Monument
- Route 1-39 (71): Suan Siam <> Khlong Toei
- Route 2-15 (97): Ministry of Public Health <> Somdej Phra Pinklao Hospital
- Route 2-38 (8): Happyland <> Phutthayotfa Bridge Pier
- Route 3-1 (2): Pak Nam <> Phutthayotfa Bridge Pier
- Route 3-6 (25): Pathumkongka School Samut Prakan <> Ekkamai Bus Terminal
- Route 3-36(4): Khlong Toei Pier <> Phasi Charoen Pier
- Route 34: Rangsit <> Hua Lamphong
- Route 4-36 (7): Suksanaree School <> Hua Lamphong
- Route 4-44 (80A): Wapawor 11 Village <> Suan Luang Rama VIII,
- Route 4-46 (84): Wat Rai Khing <> BTS Krung Thon Buri
- Route 4-15 (82): Phra Pradaeng Pier <> Banglamphu

== Fleet ==
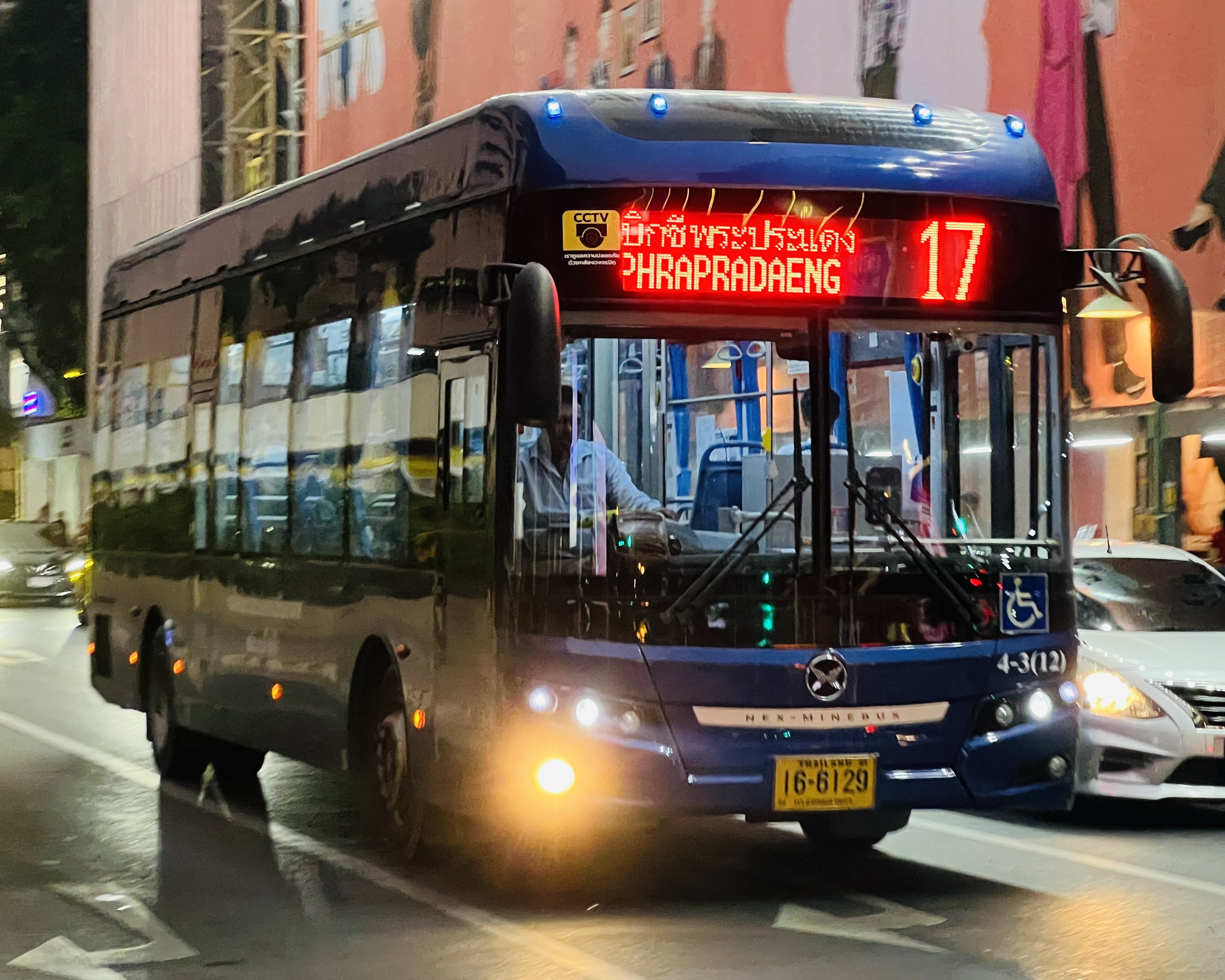

TSB operates a fleet of over 3,100 electric buses. The company uses a dark blue livery for its buses. The fleet comprises mainly 12-metre long buses, however TSB also operates 8-metre long buses. The buses can be distinguished by its unique blue colour on the roads.

== Fares ==
TSB fares vary between air-conditioned buses and non air-conditioned or "hot buses". "Hot buses" charge a flat fare of 10 THB while air-conditioned buses are charged according to the distance travelled. Fares for both buses are payable by smart card.

Adult fares for air-conditioned buses
| Short journeys (up to 4 km) | Intermediate journeys (4 km to 16 km) | Longer journeys (over 16 km) | Expressway surcharge | HOP Card Daily cap (bus only) | HOP Card Daily cap (with ferries) |
|---|---|---|---|---|---|
| 15 THB | 20 THB | 25 THB | 2 THB | 40 THB | 50 THB |

In conjunction with the Ministry of Transport, the company introduced the HOP Card in December 2022. The card can also be used to pay fares for the company's electric ferries. The card provides a daily fare cap on fares, meaning passengers need not pay more than 40-50 THB when using Thai Smile Bus buses or ferries. Discount fares are available to children, who enjoy a daily fare cap of 25 THB. Passengers must tap in and out of buses using the card to ensure the correct fare is registered.

Cards can be purchased online, in the Market Village and Tops Supermarket, onboard buses and certain major ferry terminals.

== See also ==
- Bangkok Mass Transit Authority
- Bangkok BRT
- Transport in Bangkok
