= Borommaratchachonnani =

Borommaratchachonnani is a Thai title meaning "royal mother".

Persons who held the title include:

- Saovabha Phongsri, the Queen Mother Sri Bajrindra
- Sirikit, the Queen Mother
- Srinagarindra, the Princess Mother

Borommaratchachonnani may also refer to:

- Borommaratchachonnani Road
- Boromarajonani College of Nursing
