= Bus No. 8 (Bangkok) =

Bus route in Bangkok, Thailand

2-38 (8)

Overview
- Operator: THAI SMILE BUS Company Limited (Air-Conditioner Bus)

Route
- Start: Happy Land Village (Ordinary Bus); Kheha Romklao (Air-Conditioner Bus)
- Via: The Mall Lifestore Bangkapi; Lat Phrao Road; Lat Phrao Intersection BTS MRT; Chatuchak Weekend Market; Victory Monument BTS; Ramathibodi Hospital; Wat Saket; Sampheng
- End: Memorial Bridge

Service
- Level: Daily
- Frequency: 5-15 minutes
- Operates: 04:00-24:00 (Ordinary Bus); 04:00-23:00 (Air-Conditioner Bus)

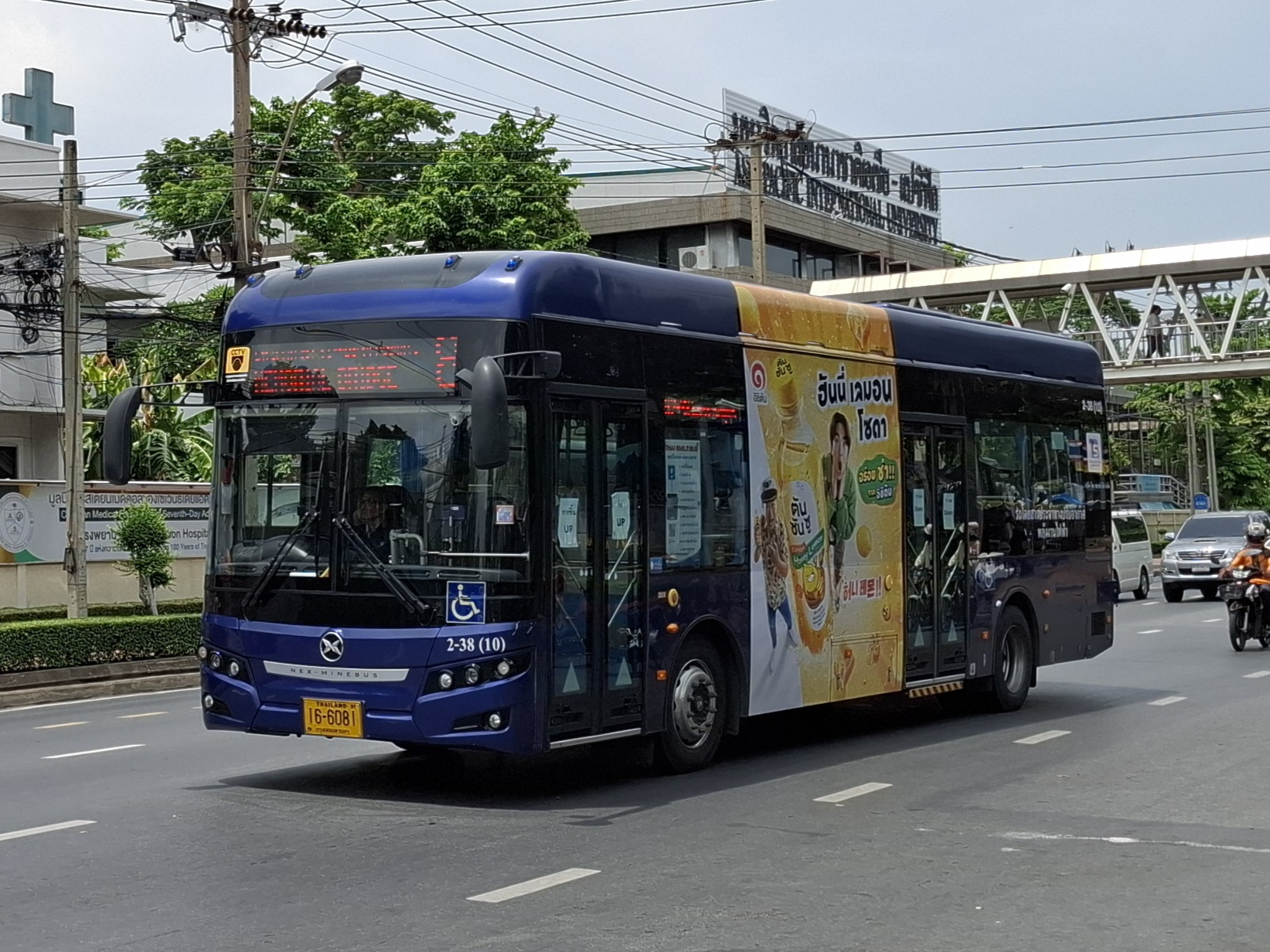
Bangkok Bus Line 2-38 (8) operated by Thai Smile Bus Co., Ltd. (TSB)

Bangkok Bus Line 2-38 (8) is a bus route in Bangkok, Thailand. Running between Happy Land Village and Memorial Bridge via Lat Phrao Road, Phahonyothin Road, and Worachak Road. It is operated by many private-joint companies since 1955. and Thai Smile Bus Co., Ltd. (TSB) since 2022.

Bus Line 8 is notorious for reckless driving and atrocious customer service. Riders filed 345 complaints about the poor services of No. 8 buses in 2015, the highest number of BMTA complaints. On average, Bus line 8 receives about 20 complaints per month. In informal polling, it has been ranked as the worst bus service in Bangkok.

== Current route ==
Bus line 8 operates via these primary locations:

- The Mall Lifestore Bangkapi MRT
- Vejthani Hospital MRT
- Imperial World Ladphrao MRT
- Chok Chai 4 Market MRT
- Ratchada-Ladphrao Intersection MRT MRT
- Lat Phrao Intersection BTS MRT
- Chatuchak Weekend Market BTS MRT
- Soi Ari BTS
- Channel 5 Headquarters BTS
- Victory Monument BTS
- Ramathibodi Hospital
- Mahidol University Phaya Thai
- Saowani Junction
- Yommarat
- Saphan Khao
- Wat Saket
- Worachak Road
- Sampheng
- Memorial Bridge

== Fares and payment method ==
Bus line 8 is operated by several private companies under concessions from the Bangkok Mass Transit Authority (BMTA). No. 8 line bus drivers are not paid a salary, but rather are paid a percentage of each day's receipts. This motivates them to make as many runs during their shifts as possible to earn more money.

== Incidents ==
- The BMTA punished two drivers of the No. 8 bus service for fist fighting on 14 May 2018. A dispute arose over whose bus would get more passengers. The two drivers confessed to having engaged in a fist fight, which was caught on camera and posted online by a Thai social media user. The BMTA fact-finding committee fined the driver who started the fight 5,000 baht and suspended him from work for seven days. His employer, Sap 88, was held accountable for the driver fighting in public and fined 5,000 baht. The second driver was fined 2,000 baht. Both men also received formal warnings.
- On 25 March 2016, a No. 8 bus crashed with a motorbike taxi, running over the head of the taxi's female passenger, killing her instantly. This prompted the BMTA to warn operators of No. 8 buses to improve services and ensure passenger safety or lose their concessions. BMTA officials briefed drivers and attendants of No. 8 buses at their terminals before the start of their shifts. They were told to stop at bus stops, not to race against one another, to follow traffic rules, and not to leave the slow, left lanes.
- On 23 June 2015, a No. 8 bus crashed headlong into a pickup truck, two cars, and a BTS Skytrain pillar. Two passengers and the driver sustained injuries. The driver was charged with reckless driving.
- In March 2014, a No. 8 Bus hit and crushed a motorcycle, instantly killing a 13-year-old boy.
- In 2011, a person was killed and another injured while waiting at a bus stop when a No. 8 Bus was vying with another bus for space at a bus stop.
- In October 2019, the driver of a No. 8 bus was sacked for "...slamming his way past level crossing barriers..." in Bangkok. The incident was captured in a video that went viral on social media. The bus is operated by 39 Group Ltd. which was fined 5,000 baht.
- During 16 July 2021 - 31 October 2022, BMTA operates air-conditioned buses, Line 8, on the route "Kheha Romklao - Memorial Bridge"
- In July 2022, private bus line 8 did not pass the service quality assessment from the Department of Land Transport. After this, the line number will be changed to 2-38, serviced by Thai Smile Bus Co., Ltd., which will switch to EV air-conditioned buses instead.
- On 19 August 2022, the Ministry of Transport (Thailand) held a ceremony to open EV bus service, Line 8, by Thai Smile Bus Co., Ltd.

== Reception ==
Bus line 8 appears in a few video game mods.

- Left 4 Dead 2
- Grand Theft Auto V: The mod that showcase the bus went viral due to a YouTube video uploaded On 30 June 2015. The video shows the bus running amok on Bangkok streets, speeding and hitting buildings, until a final collision sends the bloodied driver flying from the bus.
