= Chimphli =

Coordinates: 13°47′08.9″N 100°25′54.3″E

Chimphli ฉิมพลี
- Khwaeng
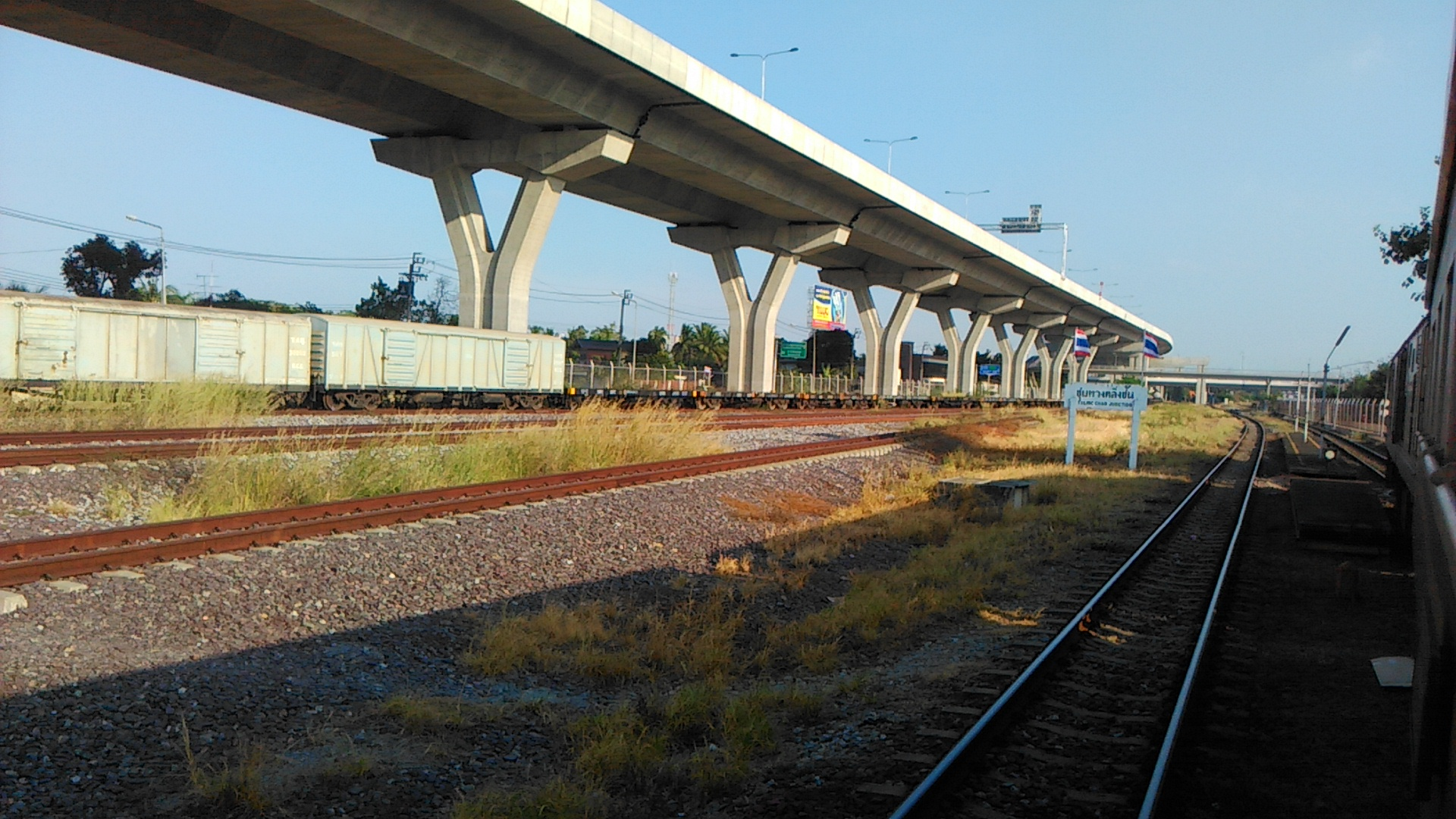
- Tracks, Taling Chan railway station

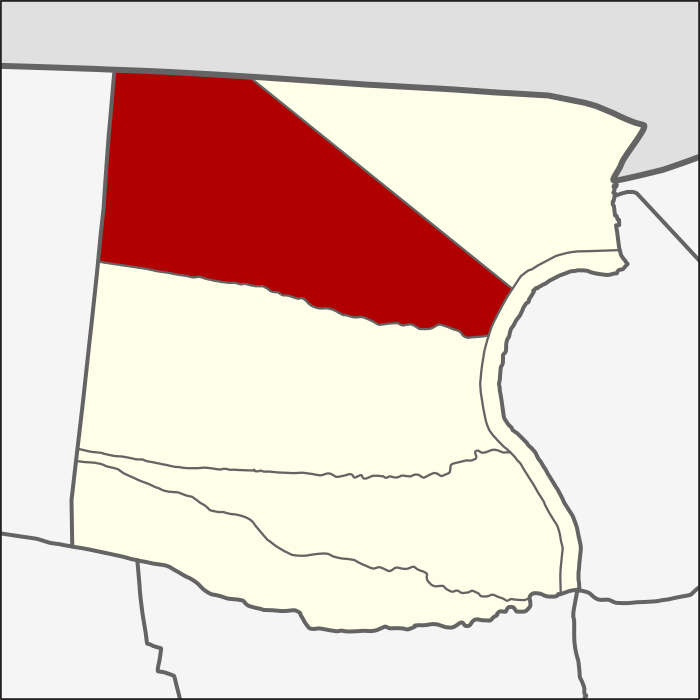
- Location in Taling Chan District
- Country: Thailand
- Province: Bangkok
- Khet: Taling Chan

Area
  - Total: 7.338 km^{2} (2.833 sq mi)

Population (2020)
  - Total: 23,782
  - Density: 3,240.94/km^{2} (8,394.0/sq mi)
- Time zone: UTC+7 (ICT)
- Postal code: 10170
- TIS 1099: 101903

Chimphli (Thai: ฉิมพลี, pronounced [t͡ɕʰǐm.pʰlīː]), also written as Chim Phli, is a khwaeng (sub-district) of Taling Chan District, Thonburi side of Bangkok.

== History ==
Chimphli was originally a tambon in Amphoe Taling Chan, Thonburi Province. Later, Phra Nakhon and Thonburi Provinces were merged in 1972 as Bangkok. In 1986, enacted the new Bangkok Metropolitan Administration (BMA) Act. designated Bangkok as a special administrative region, Chimphli has become a full sub-district of Taling Chan District ever since.

The name Chimphli, as defined by the Royal Institute Dictionary means, cotton tree.

== Geography ==
Chimphli is regarded as a north and northwest part of the district, with a total area of 8.730 km^{2} (3.371 mi^{2}), include agricultural area of 2,666.1 rai (about 1,053.7 acres).

Neighbouring subdistricts are (from north clockwise): Maha Sawat in Amphoe Bang Kruai of Nonthaburi Province (Khlong Maha Sawat is a borderline), Taling Chan in its district (Southern railroad is a borderline), Khlong Chak Phra in its district (Chak Phra Road is a borderline), Bang Ramat in its district (Khlong Ban Sai is a borderline), and Sala Thammasop in Thawi Watthana District (Kanchanaphisek Road is a borderline), respectively.

Geography of Chimphli is a plain alternating with a slightly lowland, most of them are in the southern part of the area.

== Economy ==
Most Chimphli residents work in agriculture. Vegetables and ornamental plants are the main products of the area.

== Administration ==
Chimphli can also be divided into 11 mus (set of muban).

== Temples ==
There are six Buddhist temples in Chimphli (one of which is abandoned)

- Wat Krachang
- Wat Thong (Bang Ramat)
- Wat Phutthachak Mongkhon Chayaram
- Wat Mondop
- Wat Samo Kot
- Wat Ang Kula (abandoned)

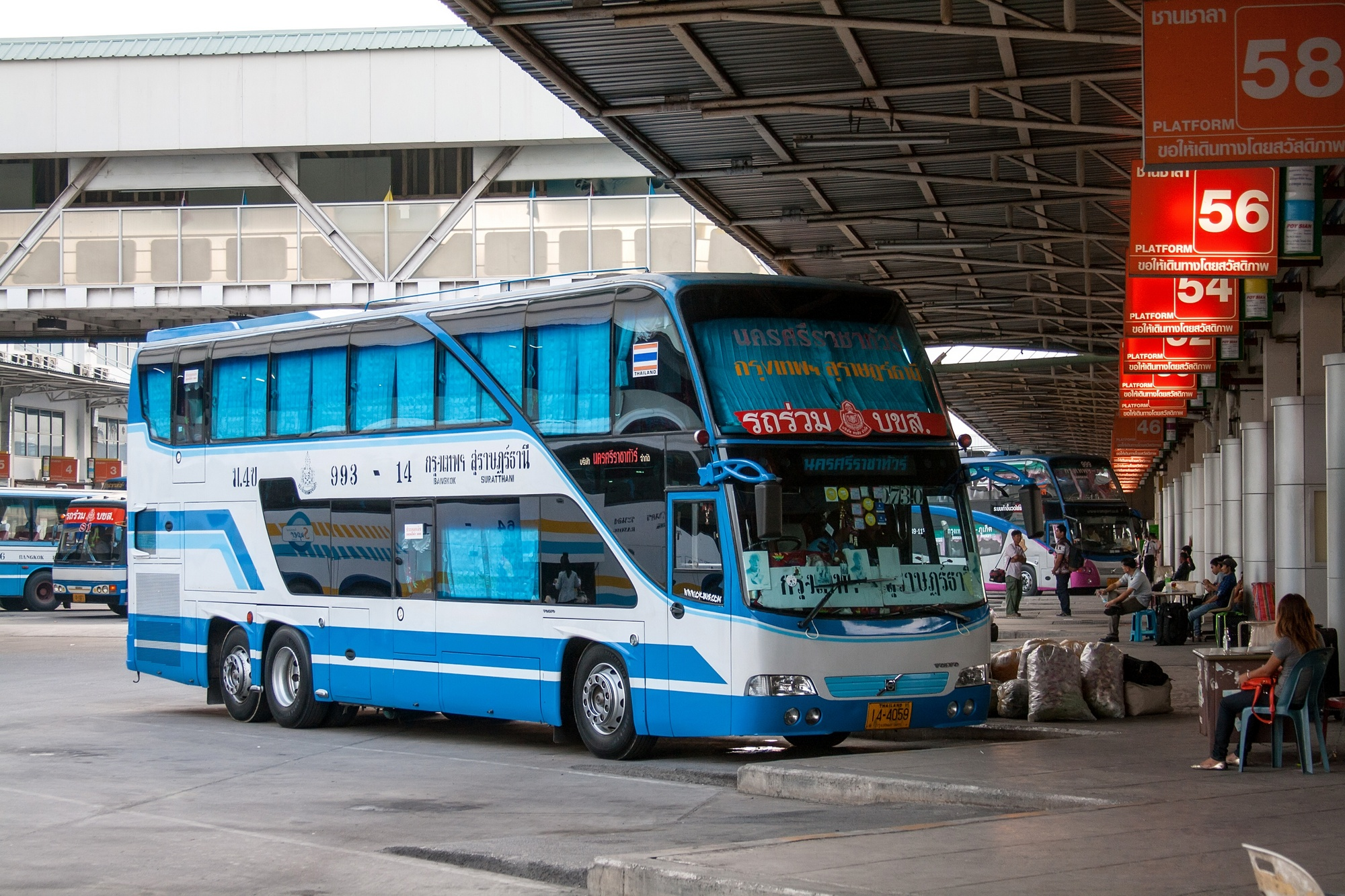
Air-conditioned double-decker bus, Bangkok Bus Terminal (Borommaratchachonnani)

== Transportation ==
Borommaratchachonnani and Phutthamonthon Sai 1 Roads are the main road, while Chimphli, Kaeo Ngoen Thong, Chak Phra, Suan Phak, and Thung Mangkon Roads are the minor road.

Bangkok Bus Terminal (Borommaratchachonnani) is a central station for buses traveling from Bangkok and vicinity to many provinces in southern region (including some provinces in central region) is located in this area as well.

Chimphli is served by the Taling Chan railway station and Ban Chim Phli railway halt of the State Railway of Thailand (SRT), whose Southern Line runs through the area. In the near future, Taling Chan railway station will also serve the Red Line commuter train from here to Bang Sue Grand Station in the downtown Bangkok.
