= Rama VIII Park =

Park in Bangkok, Thailand

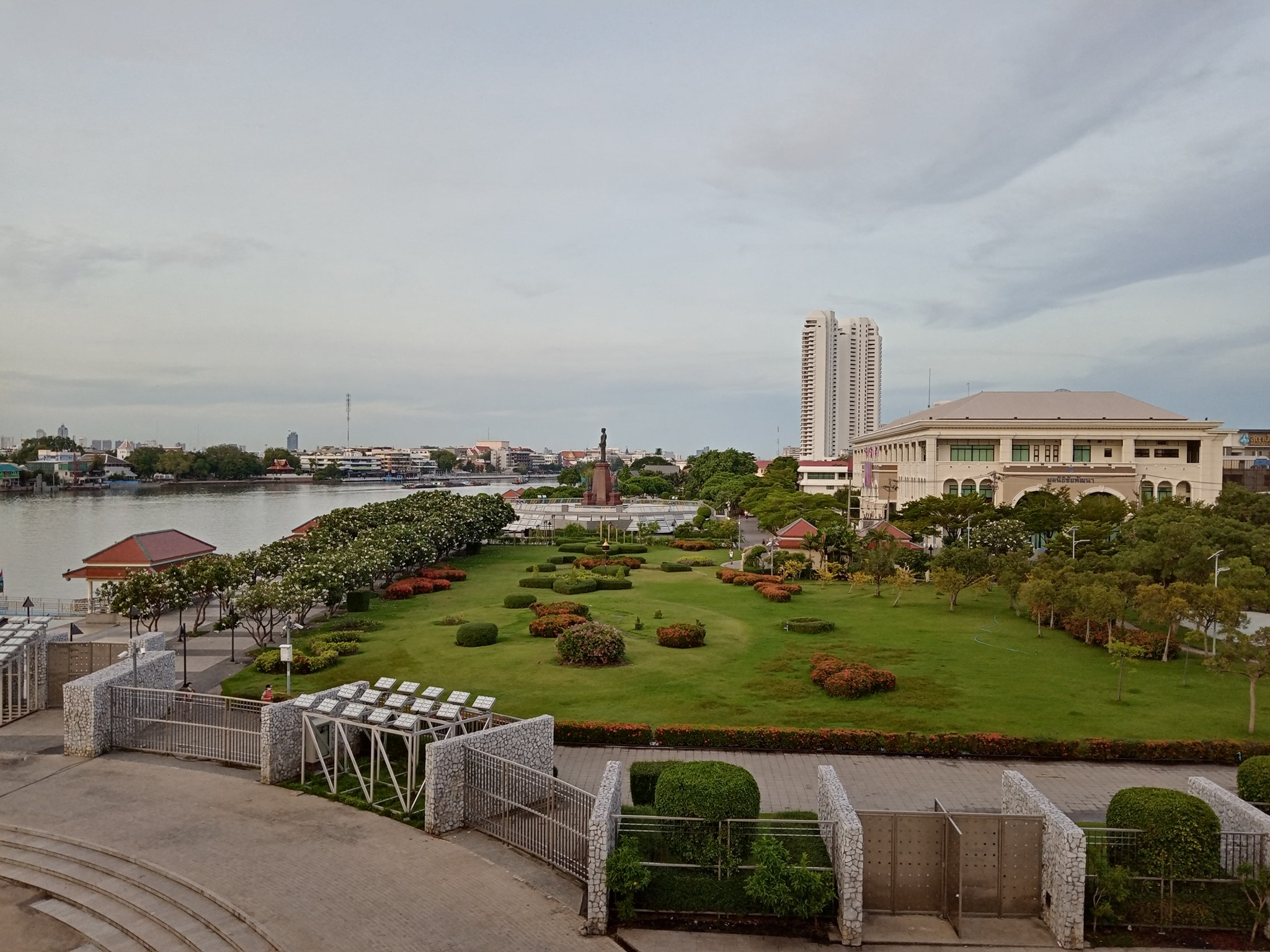
- The park and monument of King Rama VIII as seen from Rama VIII Bridge
- Interactive map of Rama VIII Park
- Type: Public park
- Location: Bang Yi Khan, Bang Phlat, Bangkok
- Coordinates: 13°46′10.1″N 100°29′41.25″E
- Area: 9.4 acres (3.8 ha)
- Operator: Bangkok Metropolitan Administration (BMA)
- Status: Open year round
- Public transit: Bang Yi Khan Station; BMTA Bus / Affiliated Bus; Taxi / Motorcycle taxi
- Website: http://office.bangkok.go.th/publicpark/park24.asp

Rama VIII Park (Thai: สวนหลวงพระราม 8, pronounced [sǔa̯n lǔa̯ŋ pʰráʔ rāːm pɛ̀ːt]) is a riverside public park in Bangkok, Thailand.

== History ==
This park was developed according to construction of Rama VIII Bridge, crossing over Chao Phraya River to connect Wisutkasat and Arun Amarin Roads and one of King Rama IX's development projects to mitigate traffic issues in Rattanakosin Island area for better releasing of vehicles to Thonburi side. Also, the site location was interesting in various aspects, such as being Chao Phrya riverside in which beautiful ambiance and views could be seen and being a great viewpoint that many historic places of Rattanakosin Island in opposite side could be sighted. For example Phra Sumen Fort, Bang Khun Phrom Palace, Dome Building, a symbol of Thammasat University (TU) or Phra Pinklao Bridge.

Moreover, the area could be potentially developed as a near sight-seeing point of transportation along Chao Phraya River and on Rama VIII Bridge. Bangkok Metropolitan Administration (BMA) then initiated the public park construction project in honour of King Rama VIII on the approach of Rama VIII Bridge, adjacent to Chao Phraya River and on Thonburi side in the area known as Bang Yi Khan. The project has aimed to pay tribute to King Ananda Mahidol, also known as King Rama VIII, the eighth monarch of the Chakri Dynasty, to allow people to salute his honour, and to provide public recreational area.

Later, the park was graciously named from King Rama IX as "Rama VIII Park".

Rama VIII Park only relieves the traffic density, and also emphasizes the new symbolic construction of Bangkok, Rama VIII Bridge which is the first crossing Chao Phraya River bridge designed as asymmetric cable-stayed bridge with particular foundation.

== Rama VIII Park places ==
The freshness of the park is obtained from tree shades and the river stream science, and there are also other attractive elements as following

- The Royal Monumental Building of King Rama VIII – The building contains the royal monument of King Ananda Mahidol, tree time sizing of the actual body and in standing attitude. It was built on the base having the same level as the bridge balustrade to value the royal monument graciously. The hall also exhibits historic and practical stories of King Ananda Mahidol.
- Chao Phraya Riverside Recreational Ground – The floor was concreted to prevent floods and to serve loads of visitors in various activities, such as walking, jogging, sitting, ceremony and event arrangement especially sightseeing of water related traditional festivals e.g. Royal Barge Procession or Loi Krathong, etc.
- Public Recreational Ground – The area is composed of two parts, the area beside canal Khlong Bang Yi Khan and the area under Rama VIII Bridge, which are divided by the royal monument building. Two parts are linked by pathway and used for relaxing, exercising, playing sports and also setting of festivals.
