= Transport in Bangkok =

Information about transit in Bangkok, Thailand.

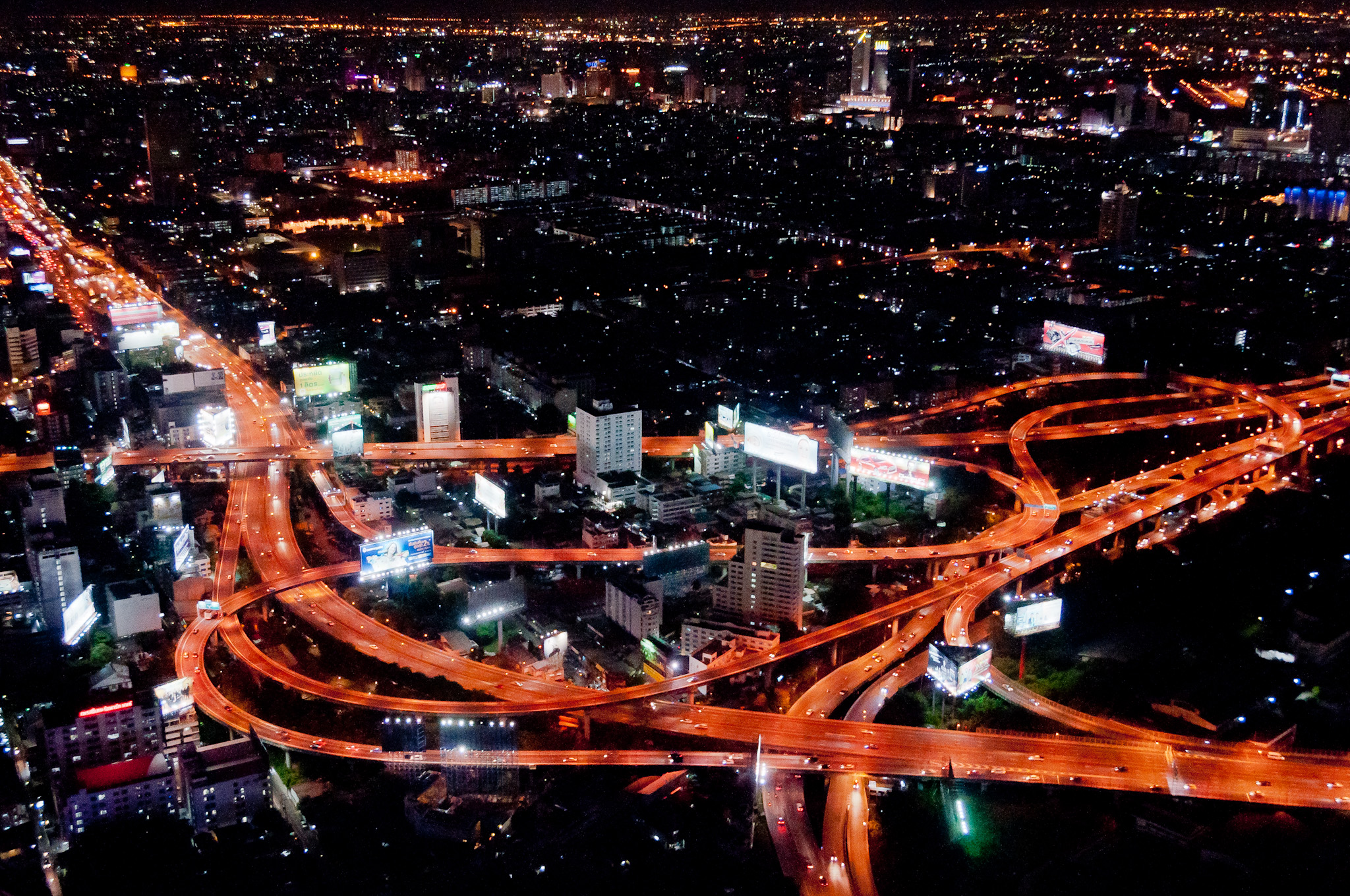
Streetlamps and headlights illuminate the Makkasan Interchange of the expressway. The system sees a traffic of over 1.5 million vehicles per day.

Bangkok has 9.7 million automobiles and motorbikes, a number the government says is eight times more than can be properly accommodated on existing roads. And those numbers are increasing by 700 additional cars and 400 motorbikes every day. Charoen Krung Road, the first road to be built by Western techniques, was completed in 1864. Since then, the road network has expanded to accommodate the sprawling city's needs. Besides roads, Bangkok is served by several other transport systems. Bangkok's canals and ferries historically served as a major mode of transport, but they have long since been eclipsed by land traffic. A complex elevated expressway network and Tollway helps bring traffic into and out of the city centre, but Bangkok's rapid growth has put a large strain on infrastructure. By the late-1970s, Bangkok became known as "the city of traffic disaster". Although rail transport was introduced in 1893 and electric trams served the city from 1894 to 1968, it was only in 1999 that Bangkok's first rapid transit system began operation. Older public transport systems include an extensive bus network and boat services which still operate on the Chao Phraya river and Saen Saep canal. Taxis appear in the form of cars, motorcycles, and tuk-tuks.

Bangkok is connected to the rest of the country through the national highway and rail networks, as well as by domestic flights to and from the city's two international airports. Its centuries-old maritime transport of goods is still conducted through Khlong Toei Port.

== Governance ==
The Bangkok Metropolitan Administration (BMA) is largely responsible for overseeing the construction and maintenance of the road network and transport systems through its Public Works Department and Traffic and Transportation Department. However, many separate government agencies are also in charge of the individual systems, and much of transport-related policy planning and funding is contributed to by the national government.

For many years politicians have pledged to improve Bangkok's road congestion. In 1995 Prime Minister Thaksin Shinawatra made a pledge to ease traffic woes within six months. In August 2018, Prime Minister Prayut Chan-o-cha ordered police to ease road congestion within three months by using integrated traffic control systems. He threatened to take disciplinary action against any police station found to be negligent in their traffic control duties. In 2022, incoming Governor of Bangkok Chadchart Sittipunt aimed to ease congestion "within one year".

In October 2024, Minister of Transport Suriya Juangroongruangkit announced plans for congestion pricing in Bangkok, which would charge 40-50 baht to drivers on street in inner Bangkok to subsidize 20 baht electric rail fares in Greater Bangkok. Governor Sittipunt announced his support for the plans.

== Roads ==
Road-based transport is the primary mode of travel in Bangkok. Due to the city's organic development, its streets do not follow an organized grid structure. Forty-eight major roads link the different areas of the city, branching into smaller streets and lanes (soi) which serve local neighbourhoods. Eleven bridges over the Chao Phraya link the two sides of the city, while the Ratchadaphisek inner ring road encircles the inner city. Several roads linking Bangkok with neighbouring and further provinces are designated as national highways, including the primary routes Phahonyothin (route 1), Sukhumvit (route 3), and Phetkasem (route 4). The outer ring road, Kanchanaphisek (motorway route 9), runs through Bangkok's suburbs, linking with Nonthaburi, Pathum Thani and Samut Prakan, while the Bangkok–Chonburi Motorway (route 7) runs to the eastern seaboard province, passing Suvarnabhumi Airport on the way.

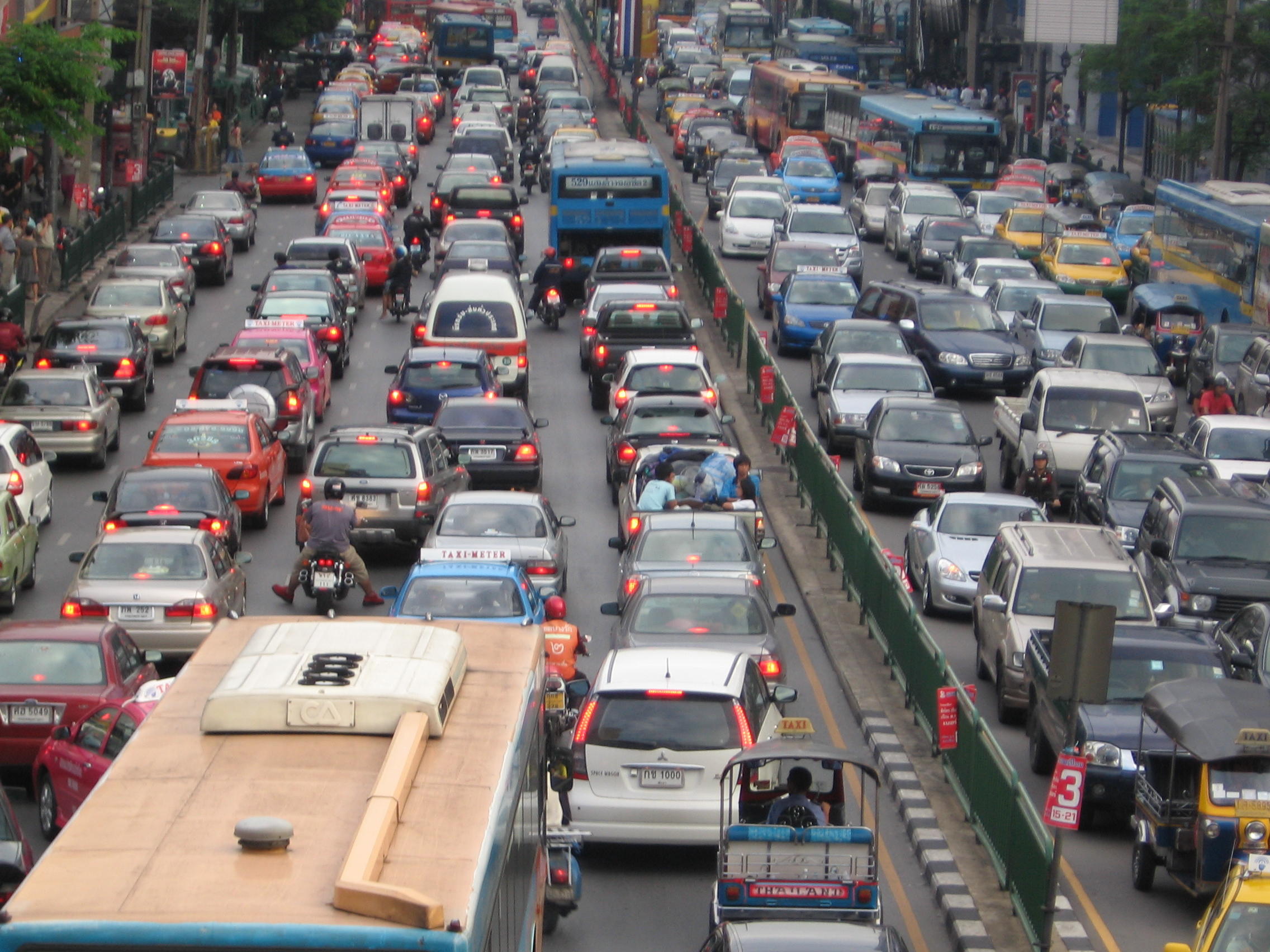
Traffic jams are common in Bangkok.

Bangkok's rapid growth in the 1980s resulted in sharp increases in vehicle ownership and traffic demand, which have since continued—in 2006 there were 3,943,211 in-use vehicles in Bangkok, of which 37.6 percent were private cars and 32.9 percent were motorcycles. These increases, in the face of limited carrying capacity, were expressed as severe traffic congestion evident by the early 1990s. The extent of the problem is such that the Thai Traffic Police has a unit of officers trained in basic midwifery in order to assist deliveries which do not reach hospital in time. While Bangkok's limited road surface area (eight percent, compared to 20–30 percent in most Western cities) is often cited as a major cause of its traffic jams, other factors, including high vehicle ownership rate relative to income level, inadequate public transport systems, and lack of transportation demand management, also play a role. In 2015, about nine million vehicles were registered in Bangkok and surrounding provinces, but the existing road system can accommodate only 1.5 million vehicles. The result is traffic jams that waste about 97 million baht worth of fuel each day on average, or about 35 billion baht a year. Efforts to alleviate the problem have included the construction of intersection bypasses and an extensive system of elevated highways (including the expressway system and Don Mueang Tollway), as well as the creation of several new rapid transit systems. These actions, however, have not been successful in improving the city's overall traffic conditions.

Traffic is one of the sources of air pollution in Bangkok, which reached serious levels in the 1990s. Efforts to improve air quality by improving fuel quality and enforcing emission standards, among others, have had some effect: atmospheric particulate matter levels dropped from 81 micrograms per cubic metre in 1997 to 43 in 2007.

Although the BMA has created thirty signed bicycle routes along several roads totalling 230 kilometres (140 mi), cycling is still largely impractical, especially in the city centre. Most of these bicycle lanes share the pavement with pedestrians. Poor surface maintenance, encroachment by hawkers and street vendors, the tropical climate, and a hostile environment for cyclists and pedestrians, make cycling and walking unpopular methods of getting around in Bangkok.

In an effort to lessen the impact of VIP convoys on Bangkok's already clogged streets, Prime Minister Prayut Chan-o-cha ordered NCPO bigwigs to "take less than 30 seconds" to drive through intersections with their police vanguard. Closing off roads for ministers and other VIPs is common practice in Thailand. With sirens blaring, police block roads to permit passage. The Thai national police chief warned of harsh penalties for officials who mismanage traffic, adding that, "...police do not want to portray the idea that cabinet members are more important than the public."

In 2024 the Thai government suggested plans to introduce a congestion charge of 40–50 baht for vehicles entering central Bangkok. This revenue would be used to subsidise a flat 20-baht fare for all electric rail lines in the city, encouraging public transit use and reducing traffic congestion. The plan is still under study, with details expected by mid-2025.

== Buses ==
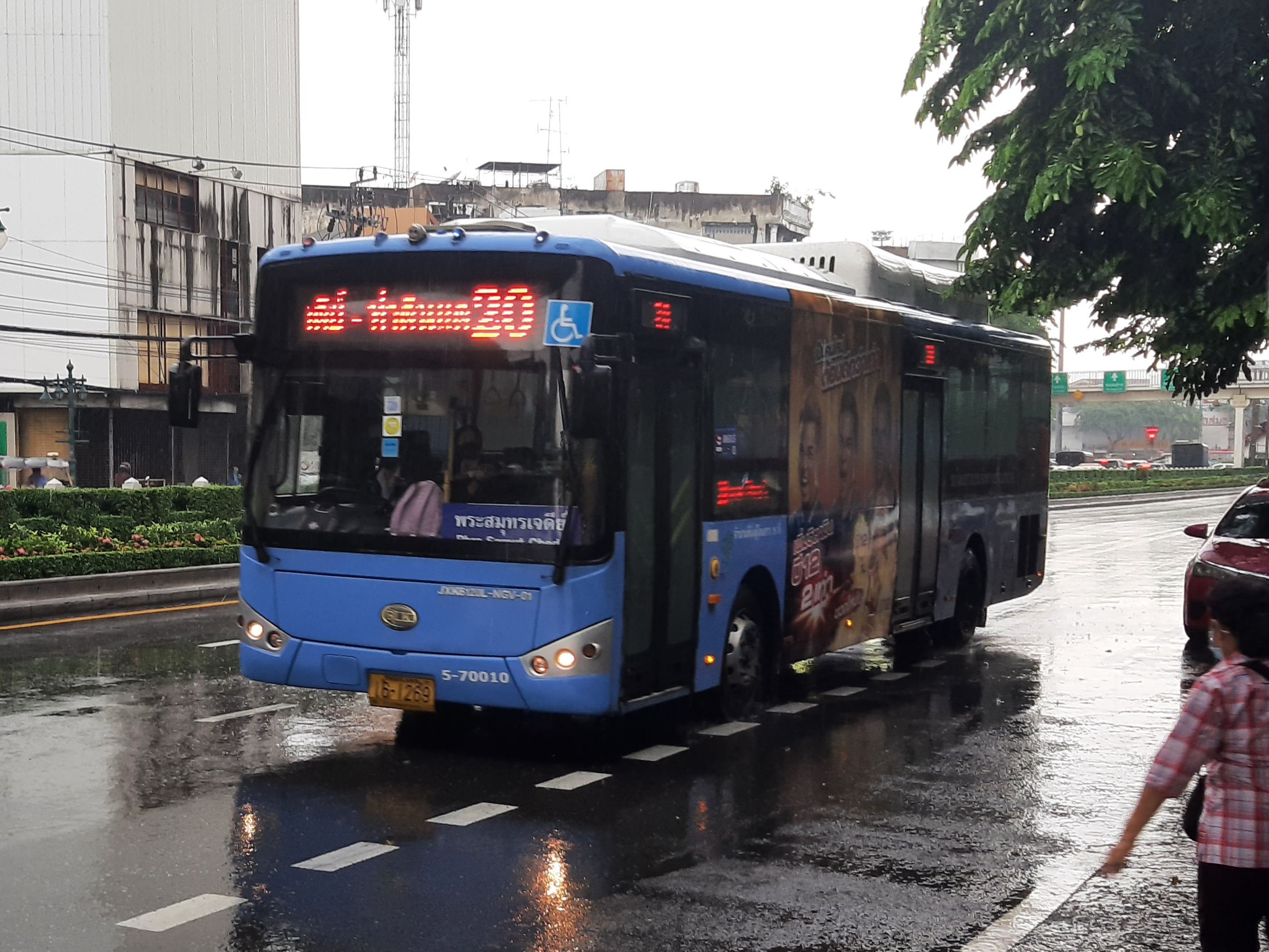
BMTA Light Blue Air-conditioned Bus in Bangkok

Bangkok has an extensive bus network providing local transit services within the Greater Bangkok area. The Bangkok Mass Transit Authority (BMTA) operates a monopoly on bus services, with substantial concessions granted to private operators such as Thai Smile Bus. 3,506 BMTA buses, together with private joint buses, minibuses, songthaews and vans totalling 16,321 in number, operate on 470 routes throughout the region. Although a large number of commuters still ride buses daily, passenger numbers have been almost consistently in decline in the past two decades. The BMTA reported an average of 1,048,442 trips per day in 2010, a quarter of the 4,073,883 reported in 1992.

A separate bus rapid transit system owned by the BMA has been in operation since 2010. Known simply as the BRT, the system currently consists of a single line running from the business district at Sathon to Ratchaphruek on the west side of the city. Although further lines had been planned, development on all route expansions are currently halted.

Long-distance bus services to all provinces operate out of Bangkok. The Transport Co., Ltd. is the BMTA's long-distance counterpart. North and northeast-bound buses leave from the Chatuchak (Mo Chit 2) Bus Terminal, while eastbound and southbound buses leave from Ekkamai and South Bangkok terminals, respectively.

Since July 25, 2024, the BMTA's bus reform policy has caused changes to 107 routes, including some being cancelled altogether. The renumbering of several bus lines has also created confusion. Many regular passengers have been affected, with some forced to switch to affiliated buses, resulting in higher fares. Critics argue that the more reforms are made, the more the system seems to regress.

== Taxis ==
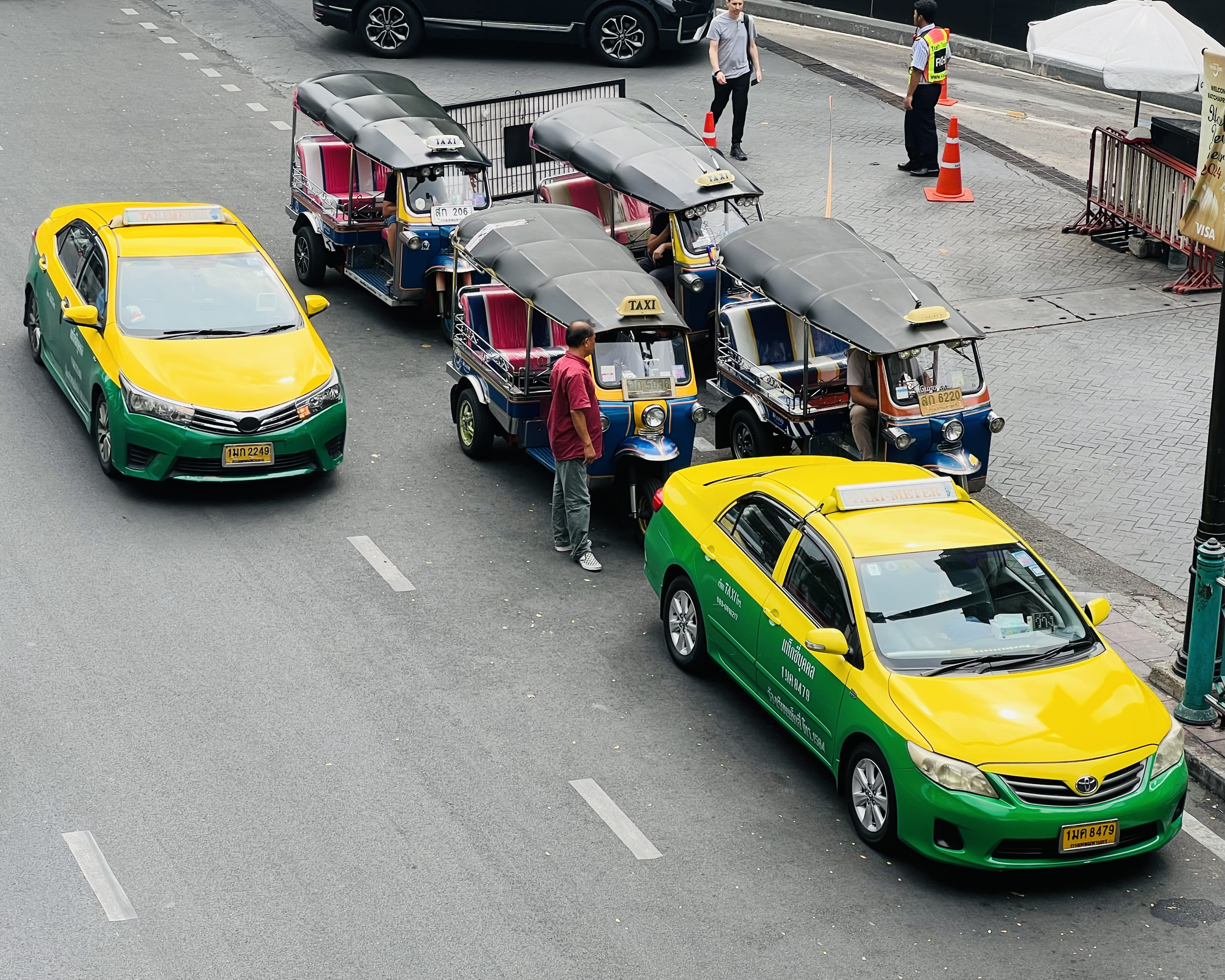
A group of taxis and tuk-tuks along Ratchadamri Road.

Taxis are ubiquitous in Bangkok, and are a popular form of transport. As of August 2012, there are 106,050 cars, 58,276 motorcycles and 8,996 tuk-tuk motorized tricycles cumulatively registered for use as taxis. Meters have been required for car taxis since 1992, while tuk-tuk fares are usually bargained. Motorcycle taxis operate from regulated ranks, with either fixed or negotiable fares, and are usually employed for relatively short journeys.

Car taxis are either privately owned, or belong to a company or cooperative. Such ownership is signaled by their distinctive paint schemes: private taxis are green-yellow, while different companies have varying colour schemes. Despite their popularity, taxis have gained a bad reputation for often refusing passengers when the requested route is not to the driver's liking. In June 2012, the Department of Land Transport announced a campaign to overhaul taxi driver registrations, as it revealed that there had been only 66,645 legally registered cabdrivers. A campaign of stricter punishments for refusing passengers was announced in September, along with the launch of new complaint-lodging systems.

Motorcycle taxis were quasi-legal and unregulated before 2003. Since 2003, registration has been required for motorcycle taxis, operators, and their 5,000 taxi ranks (Thai: วิน; RTGS: win). The 100,000 to 200,000 motorbike taxi drivers now wear distinctive numbered vests designating their district of registration and where they are allowed to accept passengers. The president of the Motorcycle Taxi Association claims that women make up roughly 30 percent of Bangkok's registered motorbike taxi drivers.

Ride hailing services like Grab and Bolt provide automobiles and motorbike taxis on-demand, and startups like MuvMi offer electric tuk-tuk commuter services.

== Rail systems ==
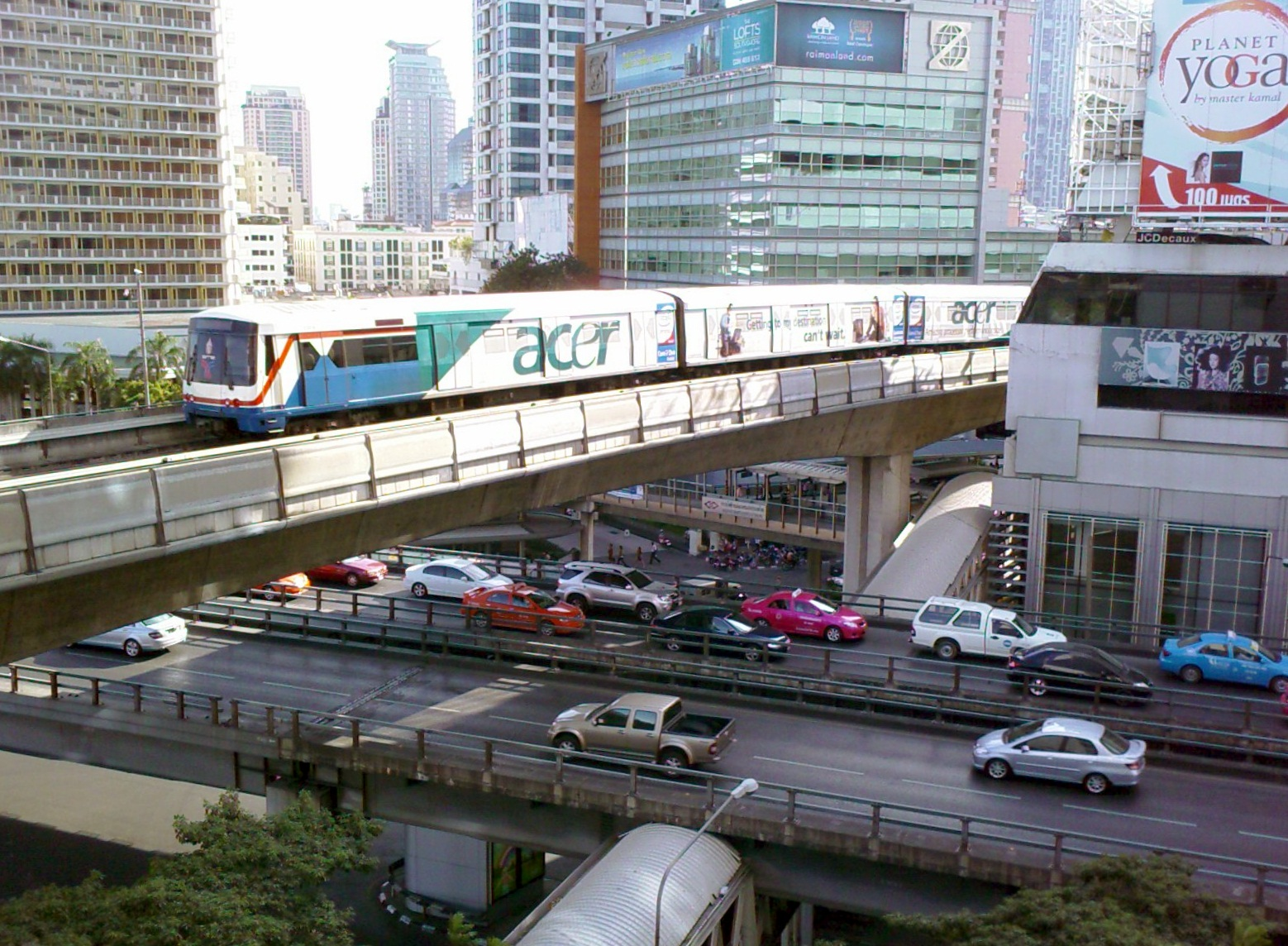
A BTS train passes over the busy Sala Daeng Intersection. The MRT also crosses below the street at this location.

Bangkok is the location of Krung Thep Aphiwat Central Terminal operated by the State Railway of Thailand (SRT) which acts as the terminal station for most long-distance trains in Thailand as of 2023. The former terminus of the national rail network was Hua Lamphong Railway Station which still operates trains on the Eastern Line and special trains. In addition to long-distance services, the SRT also operates a few daily commuter trains running from and to the outskirts of the city during the rush hour.

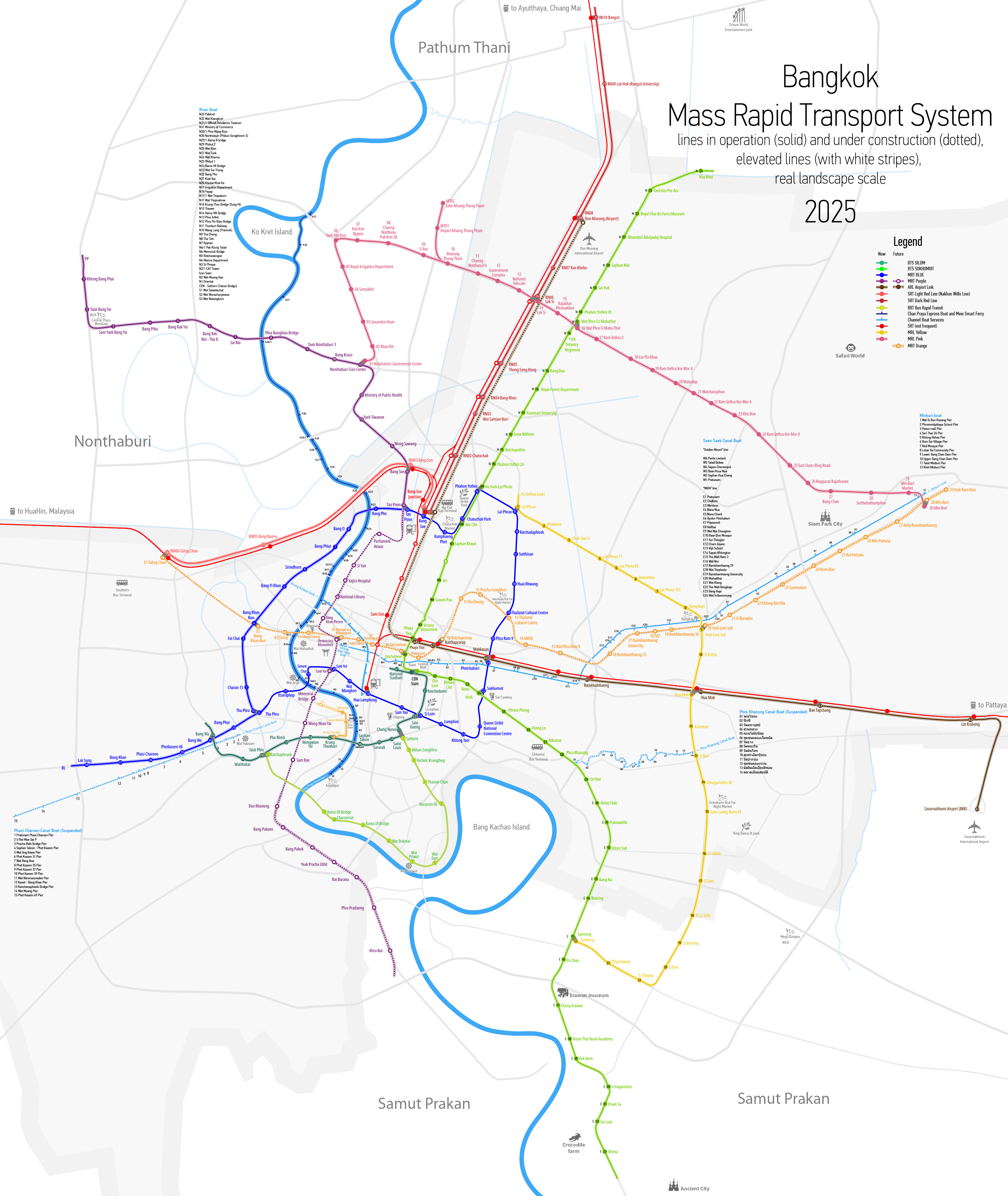
The M-Map details plans for additional rapid transit lines in Bangkok and Metropolitan Region.

Trams in Bangkok operated from 1888 and closed in 1968, following increases in road traffic.

Bangkok is currently served by four rapid rail transit systems: the BTS Skytrain, the MRT, the Airport Rail Link and the SRT Red Lines. Although proposals for the development of rapid transit in Bangkok had been made since 1975, it was only in 1999 that the BTS finally began operation.

Currently, the BTS consists of two lines, Sukhumvit and Silom, with 64 stations along 70.05 kilometres (43.53 mi) as well as the short Gold Line people mover. The MRT opened for use in July 2004 and currently consists of four lines, the Blue Line, Purple Line, Yellow Line and Pink Line, with a total of 107 stations along 133.8 kilometres (83.1 mi). The Airport Rail Link, opened in August 2010, connects the city centre to Suvarnabhumi Airport to the east. Its eight stations span a distance of 28 kilometres (17 mi). The SRT Red Lines opened in 2021 and add 41 km of track with commuter services connected to the new rail hub at Krung Thep Aphiwat Central Terminal.

Although initial passenger numbers were low, these systems have become indispensable to many commuters. The BTS reported an average weekday ridership of 720,155 trips in 2015-2016 The MRT had 260,325 passenger trips per day. Relatively high fares have kept these systems inaccessible to a portion of the population. A 20-baht fare cap on selected journeys was trialled in 2023.

The BTS and MRT have had several route extensions since their openings. As of 2023, the Orange Line was under construction as well as extensions to the Purple Line and Pink Line. The entire Mass Rapid Transit Master Plan in Bangkok Metropolitan Region consists of eight main lines and four feeder lines totalling 508 kilometres (316 mi) to be completed by 2029, a mixture of rapid transit, heavy rail and monorail systems.

== Water transport ==
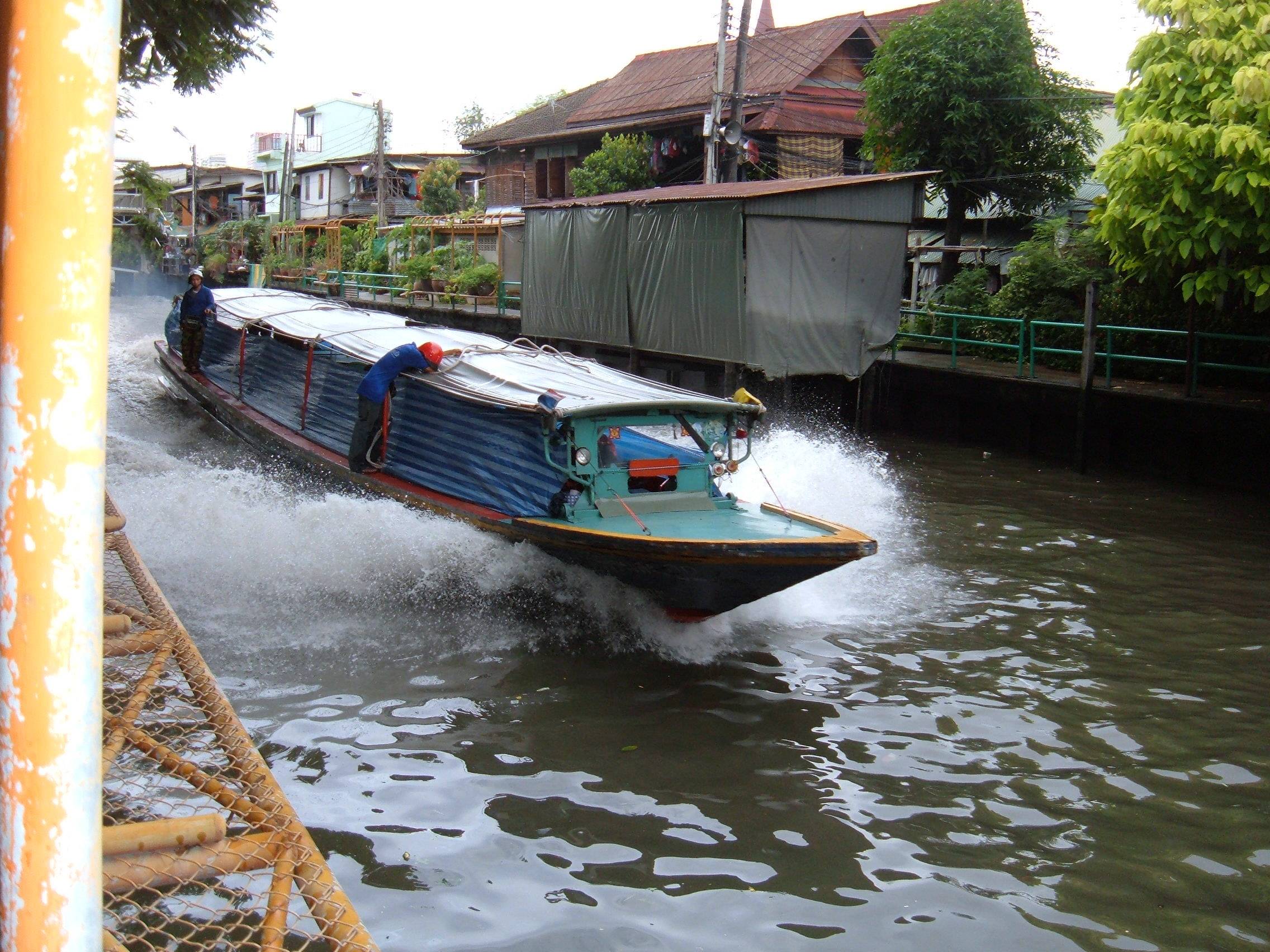
The Khlong Saen Saep water bus serves over 50,000 passengers daily.

Bangkok in former times was sometimes referred to as "Venice of the East". Canals were the main transport option for goods and people. Although many were filled in to construct roads and infrastructure, in 2018 there still remain 1,161 canals with a total length of 2,272 km.

Although much diminished from their past prominence, water-based transport still plays an important role in Bangkok and the immediate upstream and downstream provinces. As of 2025, two routes offer regularly scheduled for canal and river transportation: Khlong Saen Saep and the Chao Phraya River. Several water buses serve commuters daily. The Chao Phraya Express Boat carries passengers along the river, regularly serving thirty-four stops from Rat Burana to Nonthaburi and carrying an average of 35,586 passengers per day in 2010. The smaller Khlong Saen Saep boat service serves twenty-seven stops from Wat Si Bun Rueang to Phan Fa Lilat on Saen Saep Canal, and another service serves thirteen stops on Khlong Phra Khanong. They served a daily average of 57,557 and 721 passengers, respectively. Long-tail boats operate on fifteen regular routes on the Chao Phraya, with an average of 2,889 passengers per day. Passenger ferries at thirty-two river crossings served an average of 136,927 daily passengers in 2010. The Khlong Phasi Charoen boat service operated until 2022. Seven new routes are planned as part of a "W-Map"

Bangkok Port, popularly known by its location as Khlong Toei Port, was Thailand's main international port from its opening in 1947 until it was superseded by the deep-sea Laem Chabang Port in 1991. It is primarily a cargo port, though its inland location limits access to ships of 12,000 deadweight tonnes or less. The port handled 11,936,855 tonnes (13,158,130 tons) of cargo in the first eight months of the 2010 fiscal year, about 22 percent the total of the country's international ports.

== Utility cycling ==
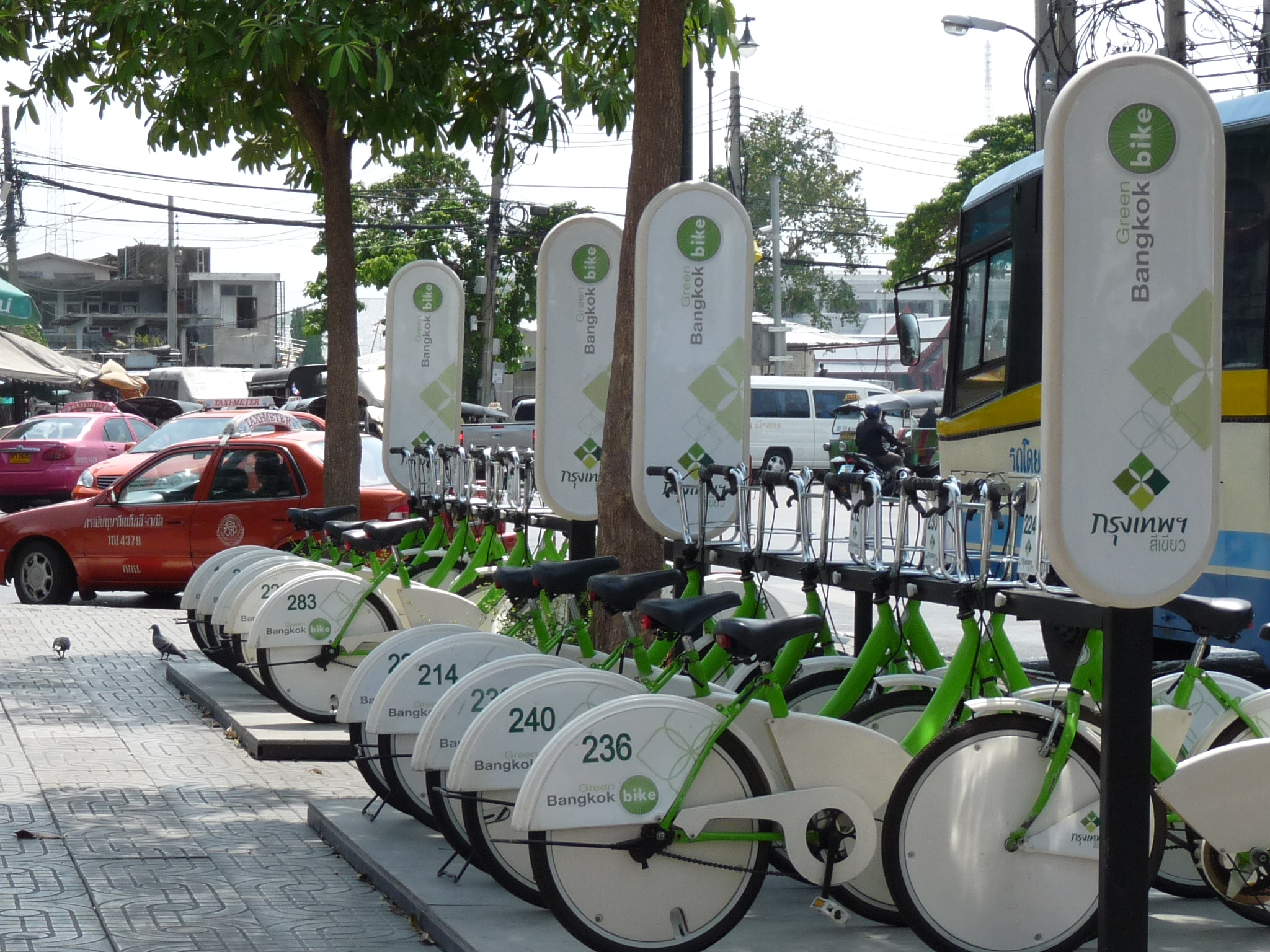
Pun Pun Bike Station

The Thai state has failed at promoting utility cycling as a mode of transport. Officials regard bicycles as toys, and cycling as a leisure activity, not as a means of transport that could help solve traffic and environmental problems. Their attitude was on display at Bangkok's celebration of World Car-Free Day 2018, celebrated on 22 September. Bangkok's Deputy Governor, Sakoltee Phattiyakul, who presided over the event, arrived in his official automobile, as did his entourage. He then mounted a bicycle for a ceremonial ride. Prior to the event, which encouraged the non-use of cars, the BMA announced there would be extensive free automobile parking spaces available for participants who were to ride bicycles in the parade.

In his first year in office, Prime Minister Prayut Chan-o-cha launched a cycling initiative, encouraging members of the public to cycle. But state investment in cycling lanes ended up a being a waste as they quickly devolved into parking lanes for motorists. All Thai rail companies, whether commuter or long distance, make on-board transport of bicycles difficult or impractical. Without state intervention, direction, and education, the public lacks the impetus to adopt a mode of transport that remains ignored by urban development projects.

== Airports ==
Bangkok is one of Asia's busiest air transport hubs. Two commercial airports serve the city, the older Don Mueang International Airport and the newer Suvarnabhumi Airport. Suvarnabhumi, which replaced Don Mueang as Bangkok's main airport at its opening in 2006, served 47,910,744 passengers in 2011, making it the world's sixteenth-busiest airport by passenger volume and the fifth-busiest in the Asia Pacific region. This amount of traffic was already over its designed capacity of 45 million passengers. By 2019, passenger numbers had risen to 65,425,879. Multiple under-construction and planned expansions could take the airport's capacity to as high as 120 million.

Don Mueang reopened for domestic flights in 2007, and resumed international services focusing on low-cost carriers in October 2012. A third terminal is planned to increase its capacity from 30 million to 48 million.

== See also ==
- Transport in Thailand
