= Bang Sue station =

Bang Sue station may refer to:

- Bang Sue Grand Station or Krung Thep Aphiwat Central Terminal, Bangkok's central rail station
  - Bang Sue MRT station, an underground station of the Bangkok MRT below Bang Sue Grand Station
- Bang Sue Junction railway station, a railway station in Bangkok which will be replaced by the new terminal
