= Pu Chao Saming Phrai =

Pu Chao Saming Phrai ปู่เจ้าสมิงพราย
- Town Municipality
- Location in Bangkok Metropolitan Region
- Coordinates: 13°38′38″N 100°34′41″E
- Country: Thailand
- Province: Samut Prakan
- District: Phra Pradaeng

Population (2015)
  - Total: 77,976
- Time zone: ICT =
- Area code: (+66) 34

Pu Chao Saming Phrai (Thai: ปู่เจ้าสมิงพราย) is a town (Thesaban Mueang) in the Phra Pradaeng District (Amphoe) of Samut Prakan Province in the Bangkok Metropolitan Region of Central Thailand. In 2015, it had a total population of 77,976 people.
