= Salaya, India =

Salaya
- city
- Location in Gujarat, India Salaya (India)
- Coordinates: 22.32°N 69.6°E
- Country: India
- State: Gujarat
- District: Devbhumi Dwarka district
- Elevation: 19 m (62 ft)

Population (2011)
  - Total: 33,246

Languages
  - Official: Kutchi, Gujarati, Hindi
- Time zone: UTC+5:30 (IST)
- Vehicle registration: GJ
- Website: gujaratindia.com

Salaya is a city and a municipality in Devbhumi Dwarka district, headquartered Jamkhambhaliya in the Indian state of Gujarat.

== Geography ==
Salaya is located at 22.32°N 69.6°E. It has an average elevation of 19 metres (62 feet).

== Demographics ==
As of 2011 India census, Salaya has a population of 33,246 of which 16,485 are males while 16,761 are females as per report released by Census India 2011. The population of children age 0-6 is 5547 which is 16.68% of the total population of Salaya Municipality. In Salaya Municipality, the female sex ratio is of 1017 against the state average of 919. Moreover, the child sex ratio in Salaya is around 982 compared to Gujarat state average of 890. The literacy rate of Salaya City is 47.63% lower than the state average of 78.03%. In Salaya, male literacy is around 61.80% while the female literacy rate is 33.79%.

Religions in Salaya Town(2011)
Religion	Percent
Islam	91.64%
Hinduism	8.21%
Others or not stated	0.15%

Salaya Municipality has total administration over 4,684 houses to which it supplies basic amenities like water and sewerage. It is also authorized to build roads within Municipality limits and impose taxes on properties coming under its jurisdiction. The population mostly consisted of Bhadela & Vaghers following Muslim Sunni Religion.

== Vessel Industries ==
Salaya is mainly famous for traditional business related to sailing vessel trade and fishing. In Salaya you will get various kinds of fresh sea water fish of very high quality. Many trawlers are operating from Salaya into the nearby coastal areas. The sailing vessels loads cargo from Indian coast to Gulf countries with much hardship. The vessels being built here are mostly of dhow type without using any modern technology or maps.
