= New Southern Bus Terminal =

Bus station in Bangkok, Thailand

Bangkok Bus Terminal (Borommaratchachonnani) Bangkok Bus Terminal (Taling Chan)
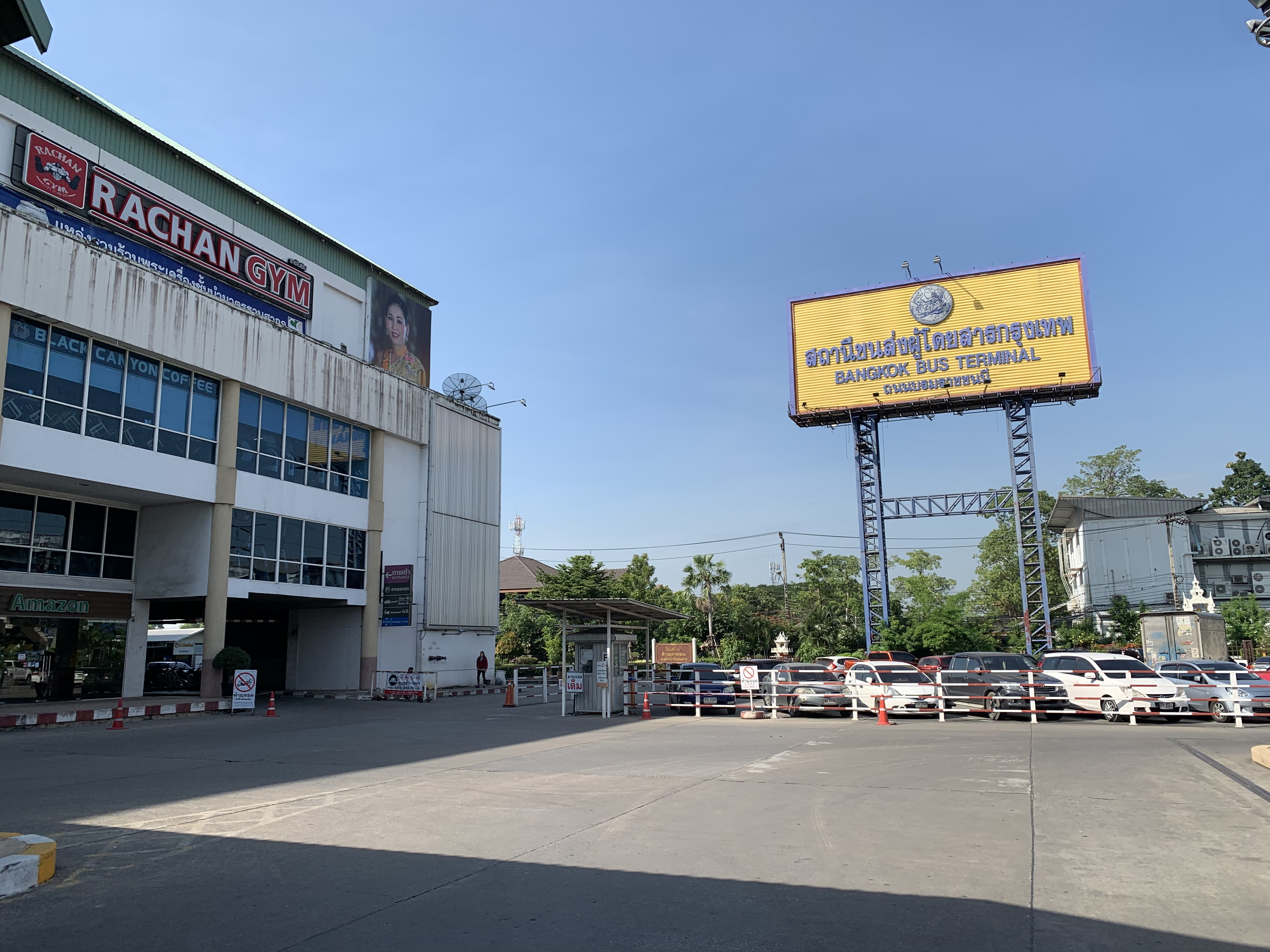
- Entrance to the main station

General information
- Location: Borommaratchachonnani, Taling Chan, Bangkok
- Coordinates: 13.7804°N 100.4228°E
- Owner: Siri Project Construction Co., Ltd. (concessioned from The Transport Co., Ltd.)
- Bus routes: Southern, Central, Western
- Bus stands: 98
- Bus operators: The Transport Company, Ltd.
- Connections: BMTA Bus / Affiliated Bus; Taxi / Motorcycle taxi

Construction
- Parking: Yes
- Accessible: Yes

History
- Opened: 1994
- Rebuilt: November 1, 2007
- Former names: New Southern Bus Terminal
Location

Bangkok Bus Terminal (Borommaratchachonnani) (Thai: สถานีขนส่งผู้โดยสารกรุงเทพ (ถนนบรมราชชนนี)), commonly known as New Southern Bus Terminal (Thai: สถานีขนส่งสายใต้ใหม่), is one of the three main long-distance bus stations serving Greater Bangkok. (The other two being Ekkamai Bus Terminal and Mo Chit 2 bus terminal) Managed by The Transport Company, Ltd., (TCL), it's the main spot for those who are traveling by bus to and from many provinces in southern Thailand (including nearby provinces of Bangkok).

In 2025, The Ministry of Transport is considering moving all three main long-distance bus terminals to Krung Thep Aphiwat Central Terminal.

== Location ==
The station is situated along Borommaratchachonnani Road in Chim Phli Subdistrict, Taling Chan District, on the western outskirts of Bangkok.

== History ==
Originally, the southern bus terminal was located on Charansanitwong Road at Fai Chai Junction, and it opened for service on January 1, 1960.

In 1989, it was moved to Borommaratchachonnani Road near the present Central Pinklao due to traffic congestion around the station. It was moved again to its current location in 1994.

Because the station has been relocated multiple times, it is known by many names, including "Bangkok Bus Terminal (Taling Chan)" and "Southern Bus Terminal." In Thai popular usage, it is often called the "New Southern Bus Terminal" to distinguish it from the old station near Central Pinklao, which still operates but now only serves vans and minibuses. The old station is commonly known as "Bangkok Bus Terminal (Pinklao)" or "Old Southern Bus Terminal." The two stations are approximately 5 km (3 mi) apart.

The current station opened on November 1, 2007, and operates similarly to an airport: only passengers with valid tickets are allowed into the boarding area.

== Layout & facilities ==
The station covers an area of 37 rai (about 11 acres).

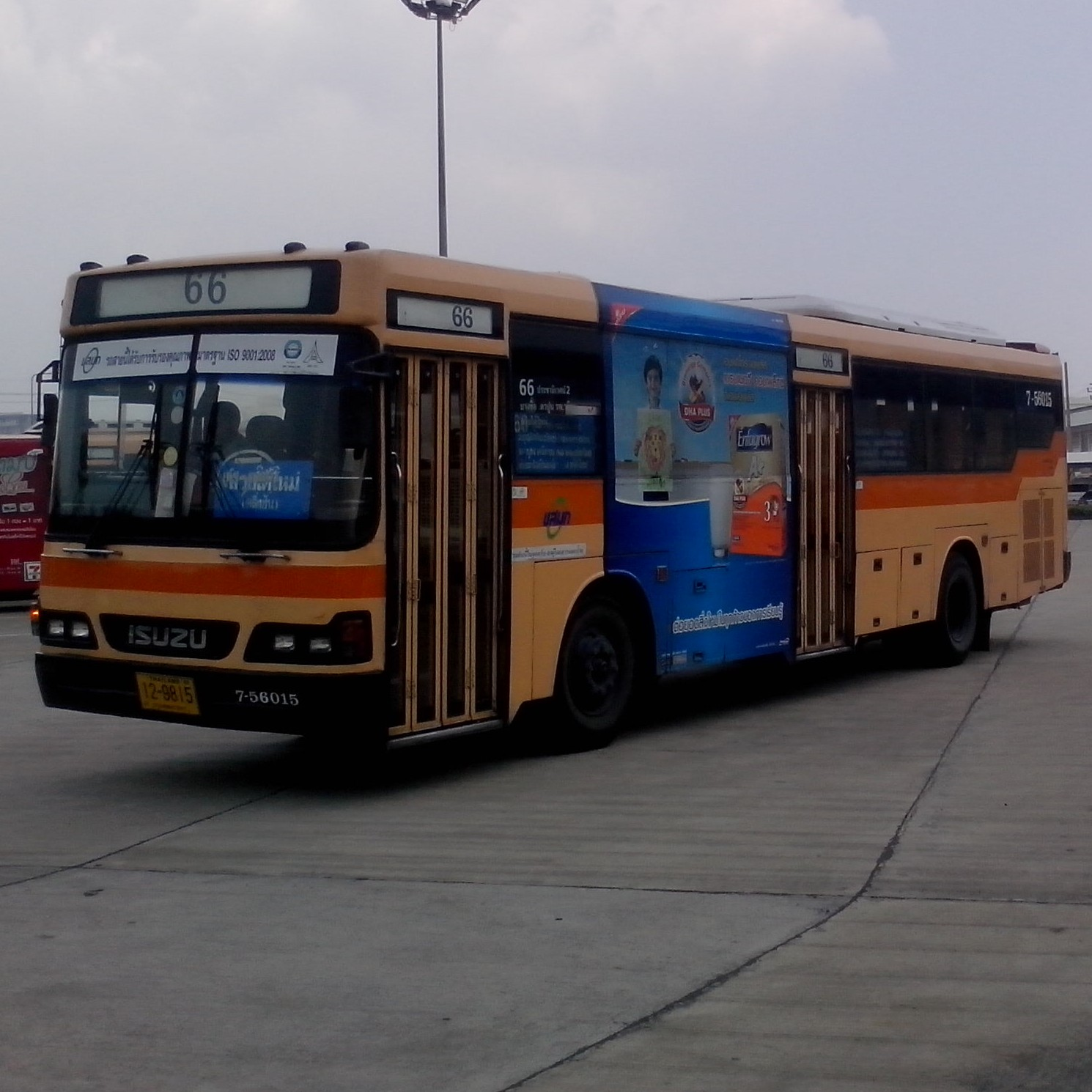
BMTA air-conditioned bus No. 66 (now 2-12 (66)) departs from Chaeng Watthana Government Complex, runs via Borommaratchachonnani Road, and terminates at this station

The main station building is an air-conditioned building with a total of 4 floors, called SC Plaza.

- M floor: parking, shops, employment agency, café, book stalls, banking service
- G floor: platform 1–24, ticket counters, taxi and minibus service, shops and convenience stores, banking service, fitness club
- 1st floor: platform 25–98, ticket counters, shops and convenience store, fast food restaurants, banking service, Muslim prayer room, room for Buddhist monk
- 2nd floor: food court, passport department, amulet center

Moreover, the station is surrounded by many private southern courier service companies. Night market, Saitai Center is next to the station.

== Bus routes ==
The following BMTA and affiliated routes serve this station: 4-57 (Southern Bus Terminal Circle–Taling Chan–Thawi Watthana), 4-38 (28) (Bangkok Bus Terminal (Taling Chan)–Victory Monument), 04-39 (40) (Bangkok Bus Terminal (Taling Chan)–Bangkok Bus Terminal (Ekkamai)), 2-12 (66) (Chaeng Watthana Government Complex–Bangkok Bus Terminal (Taling Chan)), 4-42 (79) (Borommaratchachonnani Depot–Ratchaprasong), 4-50 (123) (Om Yai–Sanam Luang), 4-51 (124) (Salaya–Sanam Luang), 4-52 (146) (Taling Chan Circle–Phet Kasem), 4-53 (149) (Taling Chan–Phutthamonthon Sai 2), 3-22E (511) (Pak Nam–Bangkok Bus Terminal (Taling Chan)), 4-61 (515) (Central Salaya–Victory Monument), 2-25 (516) (Bua Thong Kheha–Thewet), 539 (Om Noi–Victory Monument), 4-46 (556) (Wat Rai Khing–Democracy Monument).
