= Borommaratchachonnani Road =

Road in Thailand

Coordinates: 13°46′53.71″N 100°25′20.04″E

National Highway 338
- ทางหลวงแผ่นดินหมายเลข 338
- ถนนบรมราชชนนี Borommaratchachonnani Road

Route information
- Length: 33.984 km (21.117 mi)
- Existed: 1979–present

Major junctions
- East end: Bangkok
- West end: Nakhon Chai Si District, Nakhon Pathom

Location
- Country: Thailand
- Provinces: Bangkok, Nakhon Pathom

Highway system
- Highways in Thailand; Motorways; Asian Highways

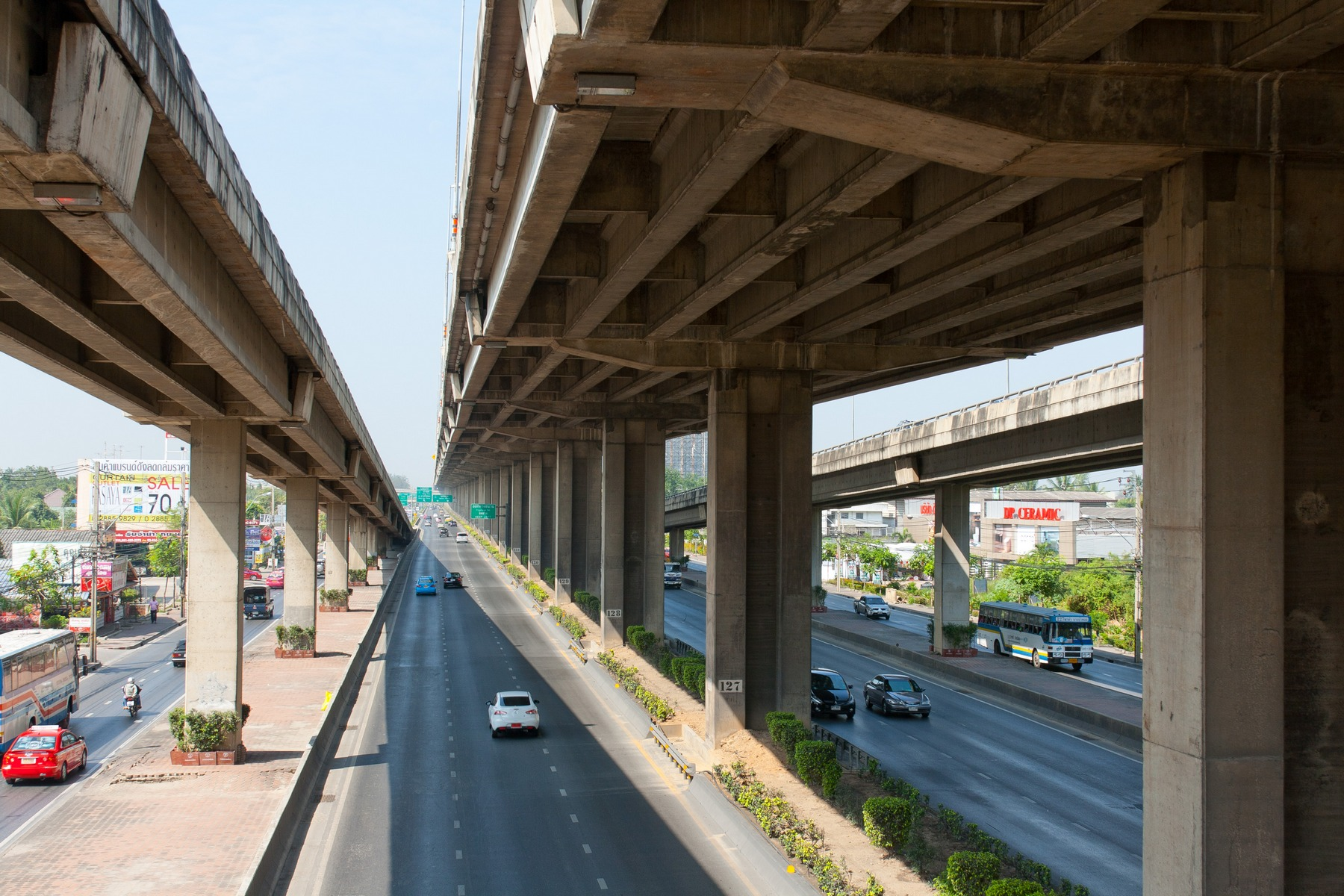
Borommaratchachonnani Road and the parallel overpass in Chimphli subdistrict, Taling Chan district

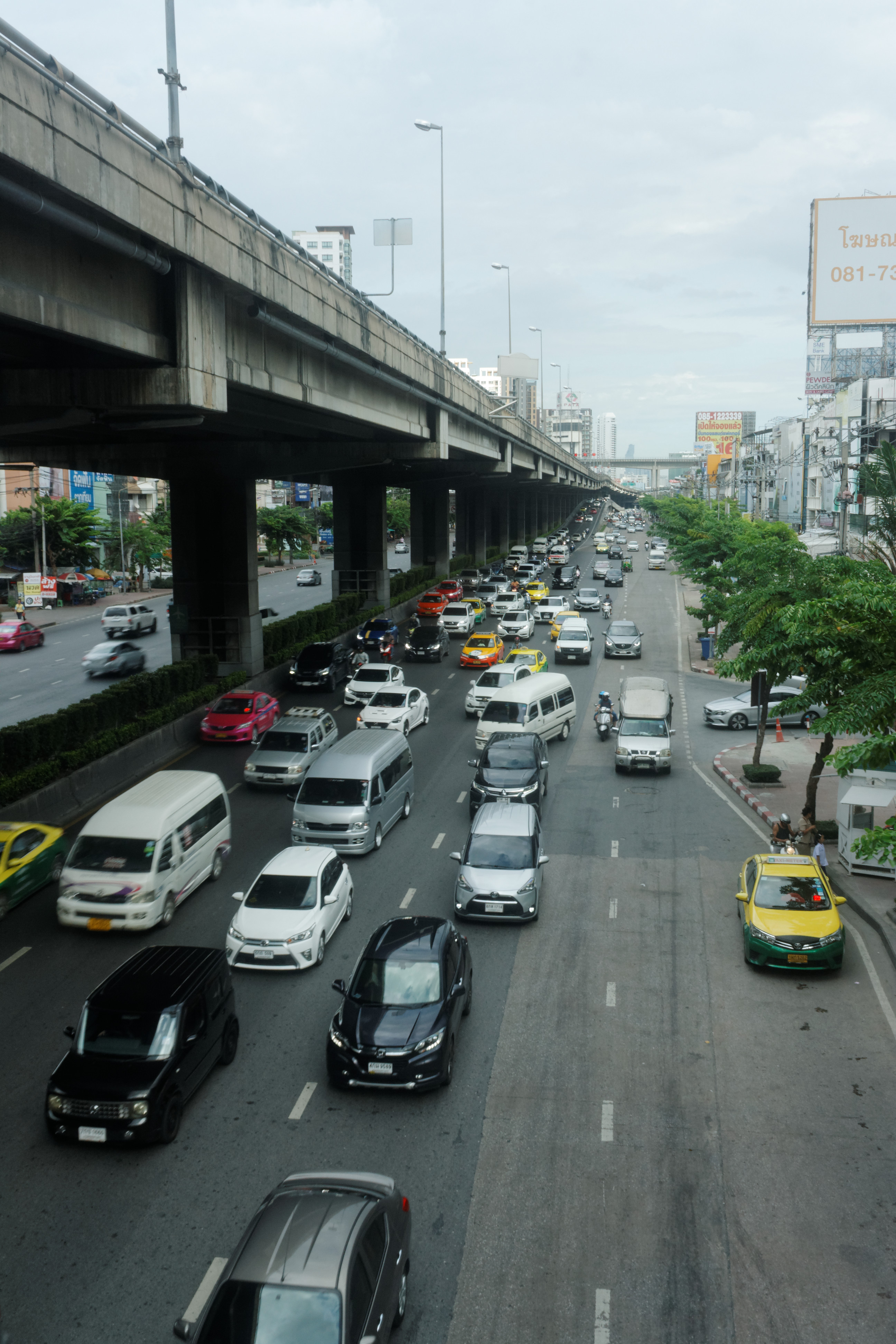
The initial section of Borommaratchachonnani Road near Borommaratchachonnani Intersection and Lotus's Pinklao

Borommaratchachonnani Road (Thai: ถนนบรมราชชนนี, RTGS: Thanon Borommaratchachonnani, pronounced [tʰā.nǒn bɔ̄ː.rōm.mā.râːt.t͡ɕʰā.t͡ɕʰōn.nā.nīː]), is a main road in Bangkok's Thonburi side (i.e. the west bank of Chao Phraya River) and Bangkok Metropolitan Region. The majority of the road constitutes Highway 338 (ทางหลวงแผ่นดินหมายเลข 338).

Borommaratchachonnani Road begins at Borommaratchachonnani Intersection, located in the Pinklao neighbourhood of Bangkok Noi and Bang Phlat districts in Bangkok. It then runs westward through Taling Chan and Thawi Watthana, continuing past Phutthamonthon and Sam Phran in Nakhon Pathom, before terminating at the intersection with Petchkasem Road (Highway 4) in Nakhon Chai Si. The total length of the road is 33.984 km (21.117 mi).

The road as it is today originated from the opening of Phra Pinklao Bridge across to the Phra Nakhon area in 1973. The bridge was later extended with the construction of Somdet Phra Pinklao Road, linking its foot to Charansanitwong Road. It was subsequently expanded to form the Bangkok Noi–Nakhon Chai Si Highway (ทางหลวงสายบางกอกน้อย–นครชัยศรี) in 1979 and completed in 1984. Initially, the road had no official name, and was therefore informally referred to as Pinklao–Nakhon Chai Si Road (ถนนปิ่นเกล้า–นครชัยศรี). It was not until 1991 that King Bhumibol Adulyadej (Rama IX) graciously named the road "Borommaratchachonnani" ('King's mother') in honour of his mother, Princess Srinagarindra.

In 1998, a parallel Borommaratchachonnani Elevated Highway was opened to alleviate traffic congestion. The elevated highway, a project initiated under the guidance of King Rama IX to improve transportation in the area, stretches a total of 14 km (8.6 mi).

Borommaratchachonnani Road runs adjacent to many notable establishments and locations such as Lotus's Pinklao, Central Plaza Pinklao, Chaophraya Hospital, the Southern Bus Terminal, Princess Maha Chakri Sirindhorn Anthropology Centre, Thongsuk College, Thonburi 2 Hospital, Thonburi Market Place, Phutthamonthon, Mahidol University main campus and Prince Mahidol Hall, the Thai Human Imagery Museum

Moreover, the road is home to Borommaratchachonnani Depot, the main terminal and depot for BMTA's bus zone 6, which operates a total of 18 routes. The depot is located on the eastbound side near Khukhanan Loi Fah (Parallel Elevated Highway) Police Station in Thawi Watthana. It was relocated from its original site on Phutthamonthon Sai 2 Road in Bang Khae, with operations commencing on April 1, 2019.
