= Don Mueang Tollway =

Tollway operator in Thailand

Uttaraphimuk Elevated Tollway
- ทางยกระดับอุตราภิมุข
- Don Mueang Tollway ดอนเมืองโทลล์เวย์
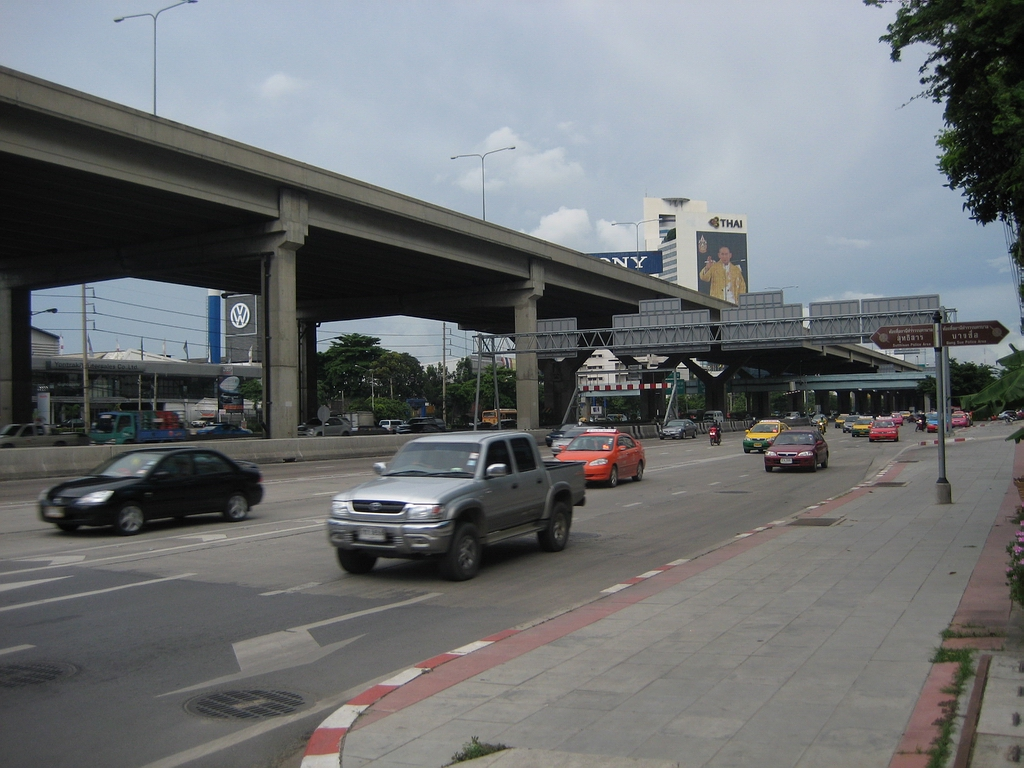
- Vibhavadi Rangsit Road and Don Mueang Tollway

Route information
- Maintained by Don Mueang Tollway Co. Ltd.
- Length: 28.1 km (17.5 mi)
- Existed: 14 December 1994–present

Major junctions
- From: Chaloem Maha Nakhon Expressway in Phaya Thai and Din Daeng, Bangkok
- To: Don Mueang International Airport, Rangsit

Location
- Country: Thailand

Highway system
- Highways in Thailand; Motorways; Asian Highways

Uttaraphimuk Elevated Tollway (Thai: ทางยกระดับอุตราภิมุข or Don Mueang Tollway Thai: ดอนเมืองโทลล์เวย์) most people call it Tollway (Thai: โทลล์เวย์) is an elevated tollway in Bangkok, Thailand. The tollway is planned to become part of Motorway 5, which connects Bang Pa-in to Mae Sai and Chiang Khong.

== History ==
The establishment of a limited company by Dyckerhoff & Widmann Company Limited and Sri Nakhon Kanyotha Company Limited was registered under the name Don Muang Tollway Company Limited, with a registered capital of Baht 1,304 million on 18 April 1988. Subsequently, the Company entered into a Tollway Concession Agreement with the Department of Highway on 21 August 1989, to construct an elevated toll road extending from km. 5+700 at Din Deang to km. 21+100 at Don Muang, covering an approximate length of 15.4 kilometers (9.6 miles), referred to as the 'Original Tollway'.

During the construction of the elevated tollway in 1992, the project faced numerous challenges, including persistent rumors of fatalities and various supernatural occurrences that hindered progress. Notably, when the first pillar at Suthisan Intersection was to be erected, it could not be lifted despite all efforts. Additionally, at Lat Phrao Intersection, where elevation was necessary, the constructed pillars and beams collapsed, resulting in worker fatalities within a short period. This pattern of collapse persisted, even with adherence to engineering standards, leading to further fatalities and halting construction. To address these issues, a large statue was carved to support a pillar on both legs at Suthisan Intersection, prior to crossing Lat Phrao Intersection.

The Original Tollway Project was officially opened to the public on 14 December 1994. Following this, the company changed its name to Don Muang Tollway Public Company Limited and increased its registered capital to Baht 3,500 million for sale to existing shareholders to fund the construction project. The expansion of the Tollway, commencing from the Rangsit District along Route No. 31 (Vibhavadirangsit Road) to Route No. 1 (Paholyothin Road), spans a total length of 7.34 kilometers (4.56 miles) and was inaugurated in 1998.

== Service ==
Don Mueang Tollway Public Company Limited (the Company) is the provider of tollway transport service for the section of Din Daeng District - Anusornsathan. The tollway offers an alternative to Vibhavadi Rangsit Road (at-grade road). It is the main road heading for the Upper Central Region, Northern Region, and Northeastern Region, with a total length of 21.9 km.

The tollway service is operated under Tollway Concession Agreement in respect of Highway No. 31, Viphavadi - Rangsit Road, Din Daeng - Don Mueang Section. The agreement is between the Department of Highways and the Company, to provide services until September 11, 2034. The concession is a Build-Transfer-Operate system (BTO). The Company designed and built the tollway with its own funds, and was awarded the concession to manage the tollway, including toll collection, traffic management, and rescue work, while the owner of the property is the Department of Highways. The Department of Highways specified the toll rates and the timeframe for toll rate adjustment in the concession agreement.

== Contrast with government projects ==
Private sector operations differ from those of state enterprises or government agencies in transport project investment. The government has mechanisms to finance transport projects without financial costs, generally by setting budgets acquired from tax collection or, if necessary, from other financial sources, with special arrangements on interest rates and loan repayment periods.

No concession periods are set for government projects; they can be operated indefinitely. The government is free to determine whether toll collection is required. A mechanism determines toll rates.

As a private sector firm, the Company operates projects during a concession period. The Company can manage projects and earn revenues during the concession period only.
