= Ramathibodi Hospital =

Ramathibodi Hospital โรงพยาบาลรามาธิบดี

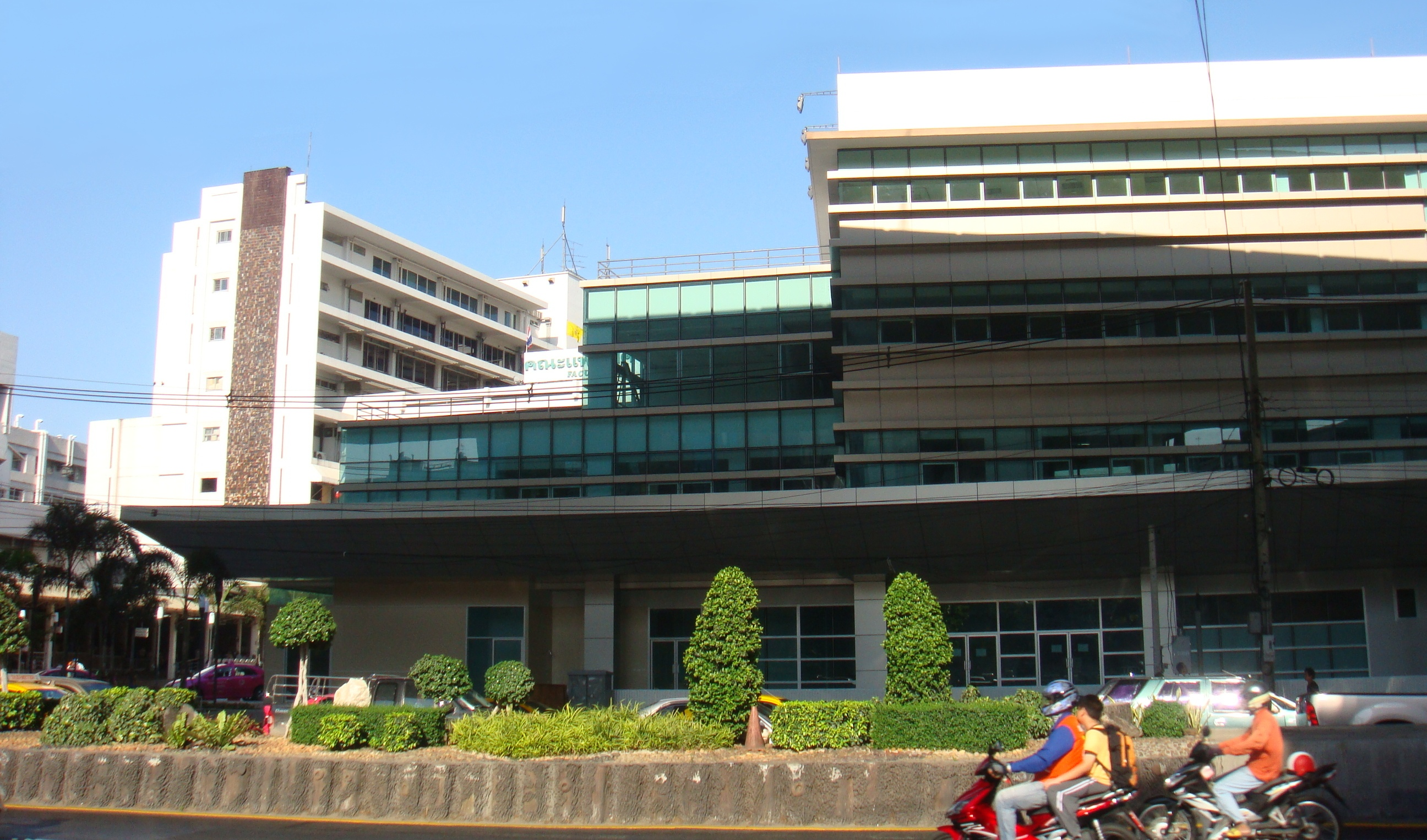

Geography
- Location: 270 Rama VI Road, Thung Phayathai Subdistrict, Ratchathewi District, Bangkok, Thailand
- Coordinates: 13°46′0″N 100°31′36″E

Organisation
- Type: Teaching, University
- Affiliated university: Faculty of Medicine Ramathibodi Hospital, Mahidol University

Services
- Standards: Tertiary Care
- Beds: 1,023

History
- Opened: 3 May 1969; 56 years ago

Links
- Website: rama.mahidol.ac.th

Ramathibodi Hospital (Thai: โรงพยาบาลรามาธิบดี) is a university hospital of the Faculty of Medicine Ramathibodi Hospital, Mahidol University. and is a hospital capable of super tertiary care. It is a teaching hospital for all undergraduate students of the Faculty of Medicine Ramathibodi Hospital.

== History ==
Following the Second National Economic and Social Development Plan (1964–1966), medical demands rose rapidly and the Thai government sought to increase the number of doctors and nurses in the country. In August 1964, the government cabinet approved the plan of setting up a new medical school which would be located around the Phaya Thai area, on the Thung Phaya Thai grounds owned by the Treasury Department and located opposite the Ministry of Industry. Furthermore, a new hospital called was also to be built on the site. On December 30, 1965, HM King Bhumibol Adulyadej graciously conferred upon the name of this new medical school "Ramathibodi" and laid the foundation stone for the faculty and hospital's buildings, as well as officially enrolling the first cohort of medical students at the Faculty of Science. Construction was started and the hospital opened on May 3, 1969 at the same time as the faculty. The hospital is generally regarded as one of the final referral centers for complicated and rare diseases from all hospitals in Thailand.

The Faculty of Medicine Ramathibodi Hospital, Mahidol University is one of the two medical schools within Mahidol University. The older sister is the Faculty of Medicine Siriraj Hospital, Mahidol University. The Logo of the Ramathibodi Hospital is the shape of ร, the first Thai letter of the Thai name of 'Ramathibodi (รามาธิบดี)'.

== Facilities ==
The hospital is located on Rama VI Road, adjacent to the Faculty of Science, Mahidol University and close to Chitralada Royal Villa. There are six main hospital buildings which serve at least 5,000 out-patient visits per day and in-patients with more than 1,000 beds for tertiary medical care

1. Building 1, the main building where the majority of inpatient wards, ICUs, operating rooms and offices for all departments as well as imaging and laboratory facilities and some outpatient clinics.
2. Building 3, also known as the "orthopedics" building, where the wards and operating rooms of the orthopedics and rehabilitation medicine are located.
3. Building 4, located at the front of the hospital, where the psychiatric, family medicine and communication science clinics are located, as well as a few short-stay wards.
4. Emergency and Trauma Center, located at the front of the hospital consisting of the emergency room and wards related to the emergency department and trauma.
5. Queen Sirikit Medical Center, hosts many medical centers for specialised treatment such as the Advanced Diagnostic Imaging and Imaging-guided Minimal Invasive Therapy Center (AIMC), Cardiovascular and Metabolic Center (CVMC) and the Queen Sirikit Medical Center (QSMC), serving as a center for advanced projects, e.g., bone marrow transplantation project. It also houses intensive care units and some inpatient wards and modern operating rooms, including those equipped with the da Vinci surgical system.
6. Somdech Phra Debaratana Building, located at the intersection corner of Ratchawithi Road and Rama VI Road and is the largest and newest building. The building is separated from the main hospital grounds by the National Cancer Center (NCI) and the Neurological Institute of Thailand, which are located between the buildings. It was opened by Princess Sirindhorn on August 14, 2011 and houses Somdech Phra Debaratana Medical Center (SDMC), which has 350 beds, 16 operating rooms, 14 intensive care units, and specialized services, such as the Stem Cell Transplantation Center, the Minimal Invasive Endoscopic Surgery Center, the Elderly Care Unit Center, the Child Development Center and the Complicated Diseases Services.

There is a shrine to Prince Abhakara Kiartivongse, Prince of Chumphon, located in the grounds. It is served by Ramathibodi Hospital Railway Halt, operated by the State Railway of Thailand.

== See also ==
- Health in Thailand
- Healthcare in Thailand
- Hospitals in Thailand
- List of hospitals in Thailand
- List of hospitals in Bangkok
- Samut Prakan radiation accident
