= Happy Land (Bangkok) =

Former amusement park in Bangkok, Thailand

Happy Land (Thai: แฮปปี้แลนด์, pronounced [hɛ́p.pîː lɛ̄ːn]) was an amusement park in Thailand. It was located in Khwaeng Khlong Chan, Bang Kapi District, Bangkok, on Nawamin Road (or Sukha Phiban 1 Road). It has been closed since 1977, and the area is now occupied by residential houses. Some of its rides were sold to Siam Park City.
