= Fa Mai =

2004 Thai TV series

- ฟ้าใหม่
- Genre: Historical; Drama; Romantic
- Based on: Fa Mai by Suporn Bunnark
- Screenplay by: Salaya Sukanivatt
- Directed by: Jaroon Thammasin
- Starring: Nattawut Sakidjai; Danuporn Punnakant; Atsadawut Luengsuntorn; Patcharapa Chaichua; Jiranan Manojam; Phudarith Prombandan; Chinmis Bunnag; Konggrapan Sengsuriya
- Opening theme: "ฟ้าใหม่" (Fa Mai) by Chitpong Treemas
- Ending theme: "ฟ้าใหม่" (Fa Mai - Slower song) by Chitpong Treemas
- Composer: Suddaen Sukkesorn
- Country of origin: Thailand
- Original language: Thai
- No. of episodes: 9 (original)

Production
- Producer: Pirat Sangvoributr
- Running time: 90 minutes per episode
- Production companies: DIDA Video Production; Samsearn; Jatingja Company

Original release
- Network: Ch7 HD
- Release: 8 June – 6 July 2004

Fa Mai (Thai: ฟ้าใหม่, RTGS: Fa Mai, pronounced [fâː màj]; lit "new horizon" (Note: Referring to new kingdom or new era.)) is a 2004 Thai television series adapted from Suporn Bunnark's novel of the same title. Discussing events in the late reign of King Borommakot. Until the establishment of the Rattanakosin city of King Buddha Yodfa Chulalok the Great through the life of Or-saen, the protagonist of the story. He is friend of Khun Kon Yai (King Phra Buddha Yodfa Chulalok the Great), Khun Kon Klang (King Taksin the Great) and Khun Kon Lek (Maha Sura Singhanat), whose authors were inspired by the history of Chao Phraya Maha Sena (Bunnag), the beginning of the Bunnag family. Khun Supon is a daughter-in-law of this family. directed by Jaroon Thammasin and starred Nattawut Sakidjai, Danuporn Punnakant, Atsadawut Luengsuntorn, Patcharapa Chaichua, Jiranan Manojam, Phudarith Prombandan, Chinmis Bunnag, Konggrapan Sengsuriya. It started airing on BBTV Channel 7 in Thailand on 9 June 2004.

== Summary ==
The end of the reign of Borommakot of Ayutthaya Kingdom. When Saen was 8 years old, he retired to Luang Pichit Borathet, the father of Saen. Take Saen to present himself as a servant of king, and he was bestowed as a chamberlain of Somdej Phra Maha Uparaja Chaofa Thammathibet.

he is close to chamberlain, 3 senior men. Khun Kon Yai and Khun Kon Lek He is a brother from a family of nobles and rich, long-standing aristocrats, goddess of Wat Dusit and has a home in the area of Wat Suwandaram. The other one, Khun Kon Klang, is a sworn friend of Khun Kon Yai and Khun Kon Lek. Khun Klang is of Chinese descent and can speak Chinese. Yuan and Malay. This senior magistrate, only Khun Yai is the chief minister of Front Palace. Khun Lek and Khun Klang are the royal servants of the Royal palace. Later, when Ayutthaya was Fallen These four chamberlains have made great contributions in salvaging and building a new city into a "new horizon" for all Thai people.

== Cast ==
=== Main cast ===
- Nattawut Sakidjai as Or-Saen
- Danuporn Punnakant as Chaofa Dok Madua
- Atsadawut Luengsuntorn as Chaofa Thammathibet Chaiyachet Suriyawong
- Patcharapa Chaichua as Renu-Nual
- Jiranan Manojam as Kara Bu-ning
- Thapakorn Ditsayanandana as Luang Pichit Borathet
- Phudarith Prombandan as Khun Kon Yai
- Chinmis Bunnag as Khun Kon Klang
- Konggrapan Sengsuriya as Khun Kon Lek
- Atima Thanaseniwat as Ploy-Waen
- Sattawat Dullayavijit as Chaofa Ekkathat
- Kajornsak Rattananitsai as King Maung Ywa
- Sombat Metanee as King Borommakot
- Bin Bunluerit as Muen Sri Sorrarakraj
- Ekapan Bunluerit as Phraya Rajmotri (Pin)
- Attachai Anantamek as Orkya Phra Phitsanulok (Rueang)
- Watcharakiet Boonpakdee as Phraya Phichai
- Adul Dulyarat as Saen's Grandfather
- Bussara Naruemit as Saen's Grandmother
- Virint Chei-Aroon as Glin Chant
- Nattarinee Kannasoot as Chao Chom Peng
- Wanyuda Saeng-U-dom as Chao Chom Man
- Suchuo Pongwilai as Maha Nawrahta
- Wanchai Paovibul as Phraya Rattana Thibet
- Piya Trakoonrat as Chamuen Wai Woranart
- Thanayong Wongtrakul as Prince Chit Sunthon
- Prab Yuttaphichai as Prince Sunthonthep
- Worapot Cha-em as Prince Sepphakdi
- Porjet Kaenphet as Phraya Phonlathep
- Pipatphon Komarathat as Ne Myo Thihapate
- Wajira Permsuriya as Riam
- Sakan Ramputra as King Maung Lauk
- Surajit Bunyanont as Luang Pipat Gosa
- Nittaya Panatuek as Aunt os Renu Nuan
- Damp Datsakorn as Tong-In
- Vatchara Sittikul as Som-Kleang
- Utsaneeyaporn Polcharoen as Princess Nim
- Praparat Rattanathada as Prik
- Kriseeh Kaewvimol as Phraya Decho
- Sura Murathanont as Phraya Thainam
- Janthana Siripol as Krab's wife
- Tassanee Seedasamutra as Phraya Chakri's wife
- Umphon Suansuk as Meun Thip Sena
- Chaiya Sudjaidee as General Suki
- Phak Phattaraphong as Phraya Aphai Raja
- Duangdao Jarujinda as Qween Aphainuchit
- Pirojna Sangwaributr as Phraya Tani Sri Sultan
- Thaksin Bunphongsa as King Alaungpaya
- Karawut Pinthong as Mahadlek Hoom-Plae
- Thannamas Kwanmas as Chaofa Sangwan
- Piyada Penjinda as Qween of Ekkathat (Princess Meng-Mao)
- Yodchai Meksuwan as Phra Sri Suriya Phaha
- Virint Chei-Aroon as Phithak Thephamat
- Govitha Watanakul as Phra Chieng-Ngern
- Chalermporn Phumphanwong as Luang Gosa

=== Recurring cast ===
- Chalong Pakdeevijit as Maha Thiha Thura
- Seri Wangnaitham as Or-Grab
- Pakorn Pornphisut as Narenthon, Prince Surenthra Phithak

== Production ==
Professor Dr. Suriya Rattanakul, the successor of Suporn Bunnag, gave an interview about the origin of this novel. The protagonist, Or-saen, was inspirated from the Bunnag family. There was a person named Sen. The character Renu Nuan was born from a woman who married Chao Khun Bunnag, named Chao Khun Nuan. She wrote 6 chapters of the novel and was published on May 19, 1967. It is a very popular novel. but still Did not write any more scripts. Until 1991 that during the summer semester, Professor Dr. Suriya found the outline of the rest of the poem. Therefore, it was published for the second time with the finished content. which received a very good response until it was made into a television drama in 2004. Based on the La Loubert archives It is an important document in the research and writing of the chapter with the historical evidence that has the most accepted content in the history. By telling stories from the reign of King Borommakot which was the most prosperous period in the late Ayutthaya period.

Sayom Sangvoributr has provided information that In the scene where the Buddha statue of Phra Si Sanphet had to be burned with gold A replica of the Si Sanphet Buddha statue has been built. by casting it out with wax and covering it with gold. in which the scene will be found while the Buddha image was burned gold has peeled into tears To convey the meaning of the loss during The 2nd Ayudhya fallen war

== Rerun ==
On October 6, 2017, after the death of King Rama IX, Channel 7, has brought this drama back to broadcast, to mourn the death of His Highness with some scenes cut off.
