= Pimolrat Pisolyabutr =

Thai actress

Pimolrat Pisolyabutra
- พิมลรัตน์ พิศลยบุตร
- Born: June 3, 1983 (age 42); Bangkok Thailand
- Other name: Kob (กบ)
- Occupation: Actress

Pimolrat Pisolyabutr (Thai: พิมลรัตน์ พิศลยบุตร) Born June 3, 1983 in Bangkok Thailand is a Thai actress. She is best known by her nickname Kob (กบ)

== Filmography ==
=== As actress ===
Year	Title	Role
2005	Seua khaap daap (The Tiger Blade)	Deungdao
