= Thephamat =

Mother of King Taksin of Thonburi Kingdom

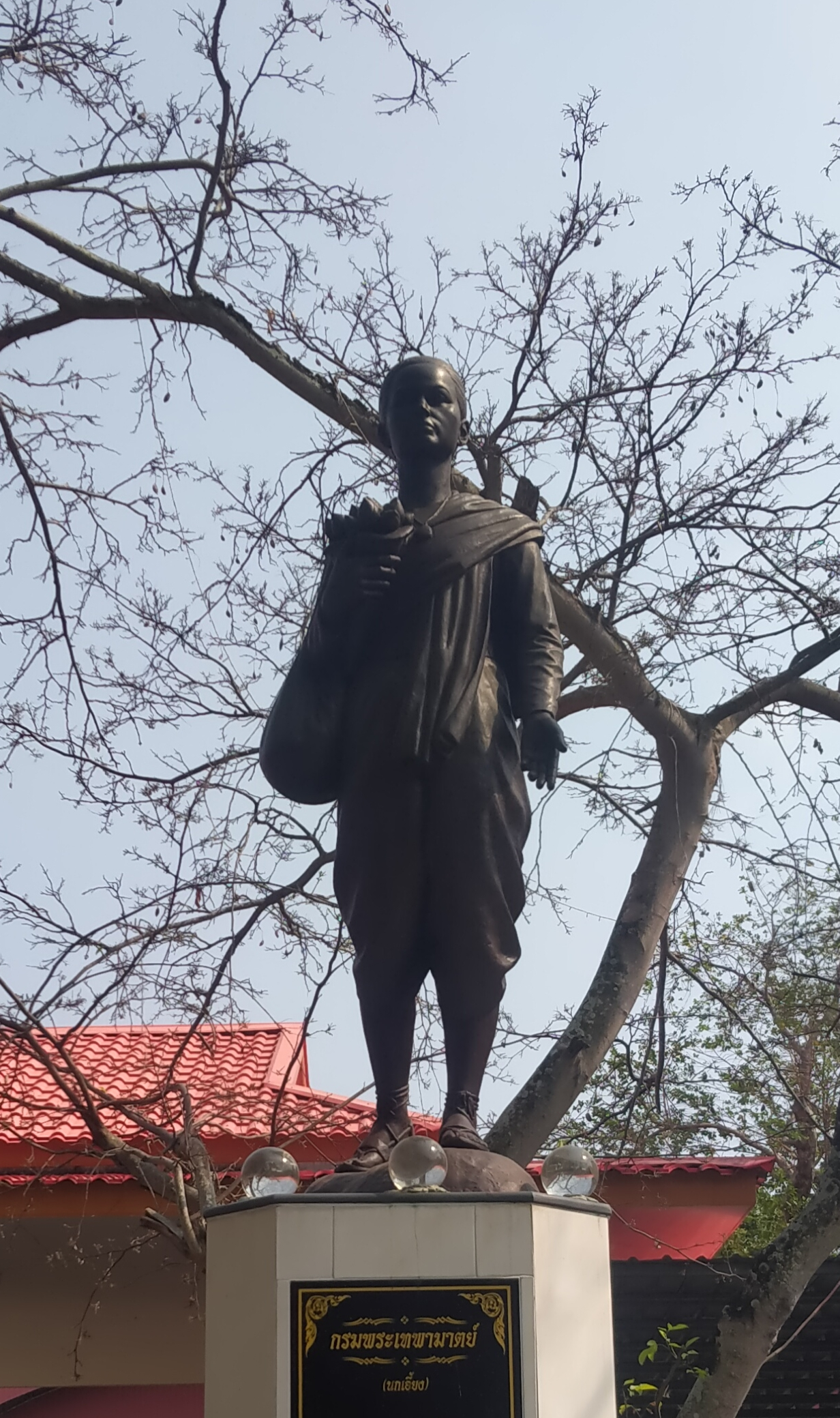
Thephamat

Krom Phra Thephamat (Thai: กรมพระเทพามาตย์, died 1774), also known as Iang (เอี้ยง) or Nok-iang (นกเอี้ยง), was a royal woman of the Thonburi dynasty, Siam. She was the mother of Taksin, the founder of Thonburi kingdom. She was of Mon-Thai descent.

== Ancestry ==
François Turpin stated that she was Chinese; if so, Taksin was a full-blooded Chinese. Kulap Tritsananon, a Thai journalist, also stated that her family name was Ngo (Chinese: 吳, Thai: โหงว).

However, official records of Thailand stated that she was a Thai noble woman, and married a Chinese merchant named Yong Saetae. Jean-Baptiste Pallegoix, also stated that she was a Thai.

Moreover, the recent studies show that Nok-iang's mother was a younger sister to Mon nobles; Phraya Phetburi (personal name: Roeang) and Phraya Ram Chaturong (personal name: Chuan). Roeang was appointed by the King Borommakot in 1757 as governor of Phetburi, then the Mon population center and naval base. Phraya Ram Chaturong (Chuan) served as chief of Siam's Mon community during the reign of King Ekkathat before the fall of Ayutthaya. Phraya Ram Chaturong (Chuan) was killed in action by Burmese forces in the fall of Ayutthaya while Phraya Phetburi (Roeang) fall in the course of King Taksin's southern campaign of 1769. Nok-iang's mother married a Thai man. Furthermore, Nok-iang's cousin, Phraya Nakhone In (personal name: Ma Khon), served as commander of Krom Dap Song Moe, one of Siam's several Mon military regiments too. Another cousin called Thong-Mon who was a daughter of Phraya Ram Chaturong (Chuan) later assigned as Thaw Songkadan (guardian of the royal treasury) by King Taksin in Taksin's Thonburi Grand Palace. Those facts prove that Nok-iang was a Mon-Thai descent, not a Chinese as previously assumed.

This conclusion is consistent with Taksin's childhood friendship with Thongduang (later Rama I) who was a descendant of Ayutthaya's Mon aristocratic family, and Taksin's association with his royalist Mon generals; Phraya Ramanwong and Phraya Phichai, and Taksin's most welcoming gesture on Mon settlement in his Thonburi capital.

== Birth of Taksin ==
She gave birth to Taksin the Great on 17 April 1734. Later, probably due to Thephamat's lineage with Mon noble family, Taksin was supposedly raised as nobility.

In 1769, she was awarded the feudal title of Somdet Krom Phra Thephamat by King Taksin. She died in 1774. She was cremated at Wat Bang Yi-roea Tai temple (in present-day Bang Yi-roea Mon), which was a cremation place for important personages of Mon ancestry or affiliation during the Thonburi period.
