= The Tiger Blade =

- The Thai theatrical poster.
- Directed by: Theeratorn Siriphunvaraporn
- Produced by: Jirun Ratthanaviriyachai
- Starring: Atsadawut Luengsuntorn
- Cinematography: Choochart Nantitanyatada
- Distributed by: Mono Film; EuropaCorp
- Release date: October 27, 2005 (Thailand)
- Running time: 91 minutes
- Country: Thailand
- Language: Thai

The Tiger Blade (Thai: เสือคาบดาบ or Seua khaap daap) is a 2005 Thai action film.

== Plot ==
A gang of criminals with supernatural powers, led by Mahesak, break a rebel Karen warlord Kaoyot out of prison, and plan to steal the national treasury of Thailand in order to fund Kaoyot's continuing fight. A secret police unit, led by Yosthana engages the criminals in various battles. Among the criminals they must face are the Five Bullets Bandit and the female warrior, G.I. Jenjila.

Though the police unit puts up a good fight, among them female officer Deungdao, in order to ultimately defeat the criminals, they need to use magic. So Yosthana obtains an old, magical sword, which is activated by the menstrual blood of a virgin.

== Cast ==
- Atsadawut Luengsuntorn as Yosthana
- Phimonrat Phisarayabud as Deungdao
- Pongpat Wachirabunjong as Kaoyot
- Sueangsuda Lawanprasertas G.I. Jenjila
- Amornrit Sriphung as Mahesak
- Chalad na Songkhla as Five Bullets Bandit
- Annan Bunnak as Red Beard

== Release ==
The Tiger Blade was released on October 27, 2005 in Thailand cinemas, where critical and box-office response was practically non-existent.

The film received more attention overseas. The Canada-based genre film website, Twitch, praised the film as "pure guilty pleasure" while acknowledging weaknesses that included an unnecessarily convoluted and complicated plot, subpar computer-generated imagery, and poorly framed and edited action sequences. "This is all true. But, damn it, what [The Tiger Blade] does well it does really well, and what it does well is have fun," Twitch's Todd Brown wrote.

The film was released on an all-region DVD in Thailand, with English subtitles, but that release is censored to blur out guns, smoking and alcohol consumption. Subsequent DVD releases in Canada, France (by Luc Besson's EuropaCorp), Japan and Hong Kong are uncensored. The movie has also been release on Blu-ray disc
