= Yong Saetae =

Chinese merchant

Yong Saetae (Thai: หยง แซ่แต้; Chinese: 鄭鏞, Teochew: Dên Iong; ?–?) was a Chinese merchant and the father of King Taksin the Great. The Vietnamese called him Trịnh Yển (鄭偃).

His birth name was Dên Dag (Chinese: 鄭達; pinyin: Zhèng Dá). Born in Chenghai County, Chaoshan, China. It was said that he was a broad-minded and unconventional man. His fellow countrymen did not like him, and called him Pai Gian Dag (痞囝達 or 歹子達, lit. "Dag, the ruffian" in Teochew). he came to Siam to do business, and became rich, and changed his name to Yong Saetae. Later, he became a tax-collector, and married a wealthy royal woman Nok-lang (later Princess Phithak Thephamat), who later gave birth to Taksin.
