= Atsadawut Luengsuntorn =

Thai actor

- อัษฎาวุธ เหลืองสุนทร
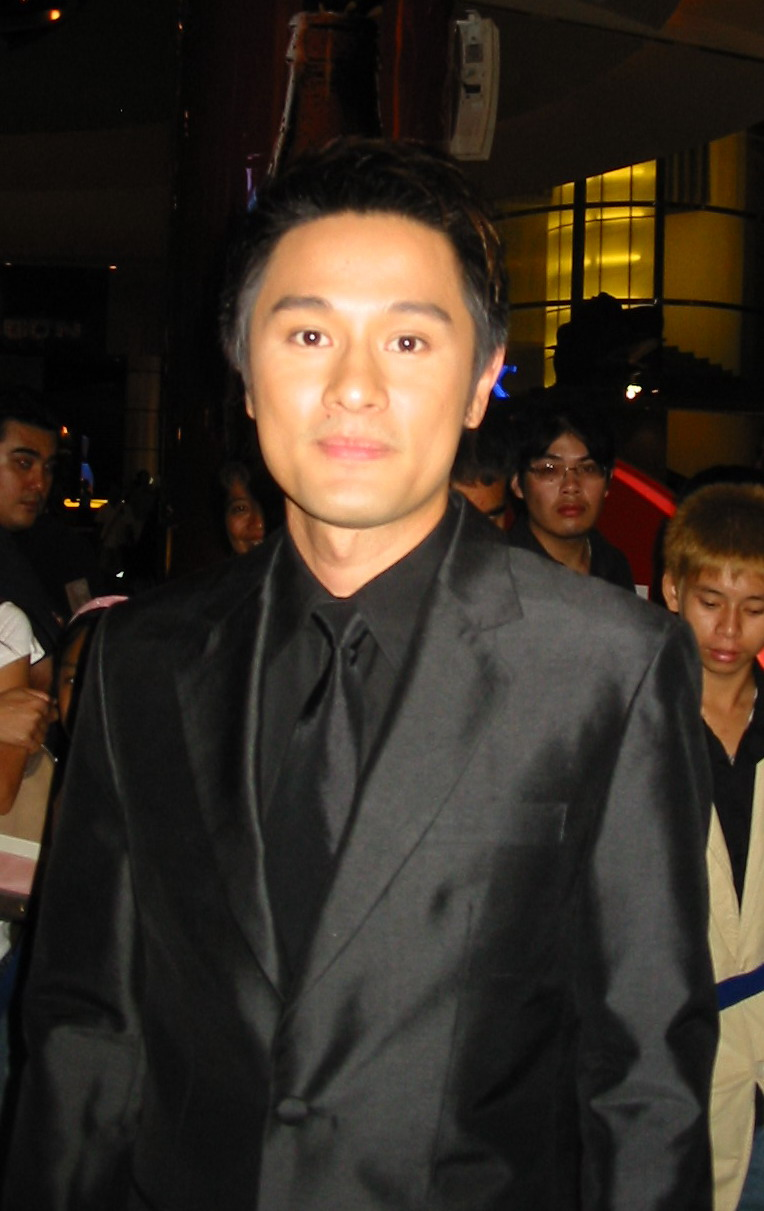
- Atsadawut at Star Entertainment Awards 2007
- Born: September 26, 1972; Phatthalung, Thailand
- Other name: Wut (วุธ)
- Occupations: Actor; TV drama director; model; radio presenter
- Years active: 1993–present
- Spouse: Panit Jianwibulyanont (m. 2009)
- Children: 1

Atsadawut Luengsuntorn (Thai: อัษฎาวุธ เหลืองสุนทร) born September 26, 1972. He is a Thai actor. In present, he has television drama producer.

== Biography ==
He was born on September 26, 1972, in the Phatthalung Province. He has Num Preaw in 1992 and then, he started a career in modelling. Then, in 1992, he played a coffee mate with Sonia Couling. He has played in the Thai television drama Bun lang Meck (Thai: บัลลังก์เมฆ) in 1993. Currently, he is a radio presenter at 89 Chill FM and television drama producer. He married with Panit Jianwibulyanont in 2009 and he has a daughter named Singha Luengsuntorn who is an artist under GMMTV label. (Thai: สิงห์ เหลืองสุนทร)

== Filmography ==
=== Film ===
- The Tiger Blade (2004) as Yosthana
- Madagascar (2005) voiced as Alex (Thai Dubbed)
- Madagascar: Escape 2 Africa (2007) voiced as Alex (Thai Dubbed)
- Speed Racer (2009) voiced as Racer X (Thai Dubbed)
- Madagascar 3: Uroupe's Most Wanted (2015) voiced as Alex (Thai Dubbed)

=== Television drama (as actor) ===
years	title	role	note
1993	Ban Lung Mek	Pakorn Nateepitak	
1994	Chao Nang	Chao Rak Fa	
1995	Ko Mon Bai Nun Tee Ter Fun Yam Nun	Tom	–
1995	Ploy Prao Seng		
1996	Mongkut Dok Som	Kongkiet Jenphanitsakul (Big Prince)	–
1996	Rattanakosin	Son	villain the first
1997	Tayat Pong Pang	Tinnat	hero the first
1998	E-sa-Ravi Chuang chot	Somsak	–
1998	Gammathep Len Gol	Doctor San	–
1999	Ga Gab Hong	Pongwat	–
1999	Puern Rang Bon Tang Rak		–
1999	Dej Mae Yai		
2000	Mae Krua Tua Yung	Vint Sethboriboon (Mr.Win)	–
2000	Matjuraj Jamlang	Camin	–
2000	Mae Nam	Song Glod	
2001	Mekha	Pawan	–
2001	Ateeta	Sirotma	–
2001	Pin Prai	Krissada	–
2002	La Sud Khob Fa	Jen Phob	–
2002	Meckhala	อนุเทพ	–
2003	Talad Rongje Likae Kwamrak	Singha	–
2003	Benja Keeta Kwamrak	Dr. Klui Piw	–
2003	Butsaba 3 Cha	Phupha	–
2003	Sanya Muea Sayanh	Suk Lak	–
2003	Hong Hun	Santi	–
2004	Fa Mai	Prince Thammathibet Chaiyachet Suriyawong (Chao Fa Kung)	–
2004	Nang Fa Dern Din	Touch	–
2005	Ribbin Kiao Gab Glong Gradat Daeng	Nimit	–
2005	Sao Noi Aoi Kwan	Nattorn	–
2005	Ban Roi Dokmai	Gobbun Chernissarachai	–
2005	Sing Motorsike Gab Yai Tua Saeb	Patthai	–
2006	Sai Rak Salawin	Phawin	–
2006	Yai Noo Lookpor	ค่อก	–
2007	Goh 1	Pran Goh	–
2007	Poo Pitak See Yaek 1–2	Cheewin	–
2007	Pood Payabat	Kasin	
2007	Rak Rai Prom Dan		
2008	Goh 2	Pran Goh	–
2008	Ter Keh Cheewit	Ruj	cameo
2008	Puen Niramit	Pranai	–
2009	Payak Yikae	Boonaek Amarintr	–
2009	Sapai Jaidej	Noppanai	–
2009	Goh 3	Pran Goh	–
2010	Mae Sri Prai	Prajet/ Intorn	–
2010	Moo 7 Dejsaratee	Bordin (din)	–
2011	Nang Sao Rak Dee	Pheem	–
2011	Weeraburut Tung Din Dam	Pandin	
2012	Pang Sanaeha	Millionaire Songkram / Denis Young	villain
2012	Tong Prakai Sad	Weerachai	
2012	Mon Rak Talad Sod	Duong	
2014	Khun Mae Chapoh Nar Khun Ya Chapoh Kij	Singsayam/ Ya Ob Jan	–
2015	Pleng Tawan	Nanthawat	

=== Television Drama (as producer) ===
Television Drama
years	title	cast	network
2554	Wiwah Har Hey	Pathit Pisitkul; Lalana Kongtoranin	Channel 7
2555	Goo Phai Huajai Weaw	Pathit Pisitkul; Poonyaporn Poonpipat	Channel 7
2556	Kun Mae Chapoh Na Kun Ya Chapoh Kij	Atsadawut Luengsuntorn pornpan Sittinavavit	Channel 7
2557	Rak Khun Tao Chang	Ket Tantap; Apa Pawilai	Channel 7
2557	Prai Payakorn	Tana Suttikamol; Praya Lundberg	Channel 7
2558	Pleng Tawan	Gantaphong Bamrungrak; Stephany Auerniq	Channel 7
2559	Nang Fa Puern Foon	Pormmin Siravanadon; Absornsiri Intarakoosin	Channel 7
2559	Seng Sud Tai	Pattarapon Dejpongvaranont; Ramida Teerapat	Channel 7
2559	Somtam Hamburger		True4U
2560	Leh Rak Ya Jai	Peerawat Kullananwat; Patsita Athi-Anantasak	Ch7 HD
2561	Kam See Tan Dorn	Tanawat Wattanaputi; Sirin Prediyanont	Ch3Thailand
2562	Gon Arun Ja Rung	Kamonchanok Kemayotin; Yuttabhichai Chanlekha	GMM 25
2562	Uthai Thevi	Poompathit Nittayarot; Warattaya Wongchayaporn	Ch3Thailand

=== TV Host ===
- Ban Noy Soy Gao aired on MCOT HD (Currently discontinued)
- Super Concert aired on Channel 3 with Paornrat Yodnen (Currently discontinued)
- Fancy Done aired on Channel 5 with Pornchita Na Songkla (Currently discontinued)
- School Bus aired on Channel 5 (At present, change the new MC)
- DJ.Chill FM 89 AtimeMedia (Currently discontinued)
- Wetee Thai aired on Channel 5 with Itsariya Saisanan (Currently discontinued)

=== Stage ===
- T.Y. family (1992)
- Inao-Choraka (1994)
- Ngoh Pa (1995)
- Amadius (1996)
- The Little Prince (1997)
- Dao Lao Nitan (1997)
- Phoo Ying Plastic (1998–2002)
- Mahajanaka (2007)

=== Music video ===
- Mai Mee Weaw – Itthi Palangkul (1992)
- Krai Kon Nan – Polpol X Labanoon
- Thorn Tua – Num Sek
- Roo Mai Tam Mai – Maleewan Jemina
