= François Henri Turpin =

French man of letters

François-Henri Turpin (1709–1799) was a French man of letters.

== Life ==
He was born at Caen. He was first a professor at the university of his native town, then went to seek his fortunes in Paris, where he made some stir in philosophical circles, and especially in that of the magnificent Helvetius; but he was only able to earn a livelihood with difficulty by putting his pen at the service of the booksellers. He translated, or rather adapted from the English, Edward W Montague's Histoire du gouvernement des anciennes républiques (1768), and wrote a continuation of Father Pierre Joseph d'Orléans, Histoire des revolutions d'Angleterre (1786).

His Histoire naturelle et civile du royaume de Siam (1771) chronicles the observations of a vicar-apostolic who had lived in Siam for many years. His chief work, La France illustre, ou Le Plutarque français, contains the biographies of generals, ministers, and eminent officers of the law (5 vols, 1777–1790), in which, however, as La Harpe said, he showed himself to be "ni Plutarque ni Français" ("neither Plutarch nor French"). He also wrote an Histoire des hommes publics tires du tiers etat (1789).
