= Thonburi Kingdom =

Kingdom in Southeast Asia (1767–1782)

Thonburi Kingdom อาณาจักรธนบุรี (Thai) Anachak Thonburi
- 1767–1782
- Trade flag

- Sphere of influence of the Thonburi Kingdom in 1780; early modern Southeast Asian political borders are subject to speculation
- Capital: Thonburi
- Common languages: Thai (official); Northern Thai; Southern Thai; Lao, Khmer; Shan, Malay; Various Chinese languages
- Religion: Majority: Buddhism; Minority: Hinduism, Christianity, Islam
- Government: Mandala kingdom
- Monarch
  - 1767–1782: Taksin
- Viceroy
  - –1782: Inthraphithak
- Historical era: Early modern era
  - Capture of Chonburi and Rayong: January 1767
  - Coronation of Taksin: 28 December 1767
  - Capture of Nakhon Si Thammarat: 21 September 1769
  - Capture of Phitsanulok: 8 August 1770
  - Capture of Chiang Mai: 14 January 1775
  - Fall of Phitsanulok: 15 March 1776
  - Recognition by the Qing dynasty: 1777–1782
  - Capture of Vientiane: March 1779
  - Deposition of Taksin: 1 April 1782
- Currency: Photduang
Preceded by
Ayutthaya Kingdom
Phimai
Phitsanulok
Sawangburi
Nakhon Si Thammarat
Succeeded by
Rattanakosin Kingdom
- Today part of: Thailand; Laos; Myanmar; Cambodia

The Thonburi Kingdom (Note: Thai: ธนบุรี, RTGS: Thonburi, IAST: Dhanapura, pronounced [tʰōn būrīː]) was a major Siamese kingdom which existed in Southeast Asia from 1767 to 1782, centred on the city of Thonburi, in Siam or present-day Thailand. The kingdom was founded by Taksin, who reunited Siam following the collapse of the Ayutthaya Kingdom, which saw the country separate into five warring regional states. The Thonburi Kingdom oversaw the rapid reunification and reestablishment of Siam as a preeminent military power within mainland Southeast Asia, overseeing the country's expansion to its greatest territorial extent up to that point in its history, incorporating Lan Na, the Laotian kingdoms (Luang Phrabang, Vientiane, Champasak), and Cambodia under the Siamese sphere of influence.

The Thonburi Kingdom saw the consolidation and continued growth of Chinese trade from Qing China, a continuation from the late Ayutthaya period (1688-1767), and the increased influence of the Chinese community in Siam, with Taksin and later monarchs sharing close connections and close family ties with the Sino-Siamese community.

The Thonburi Kingdom lasted for only 14 years, ending in 1782 when Taksin was deposed by a major Thonburi military commander, Chao Phraya Chakri, who subsequently founded the Rattanakosin Kingdom, the fourth and present ruling kingdom of Thailand.

== History ==
=== Taksin's reunification of Siam ===
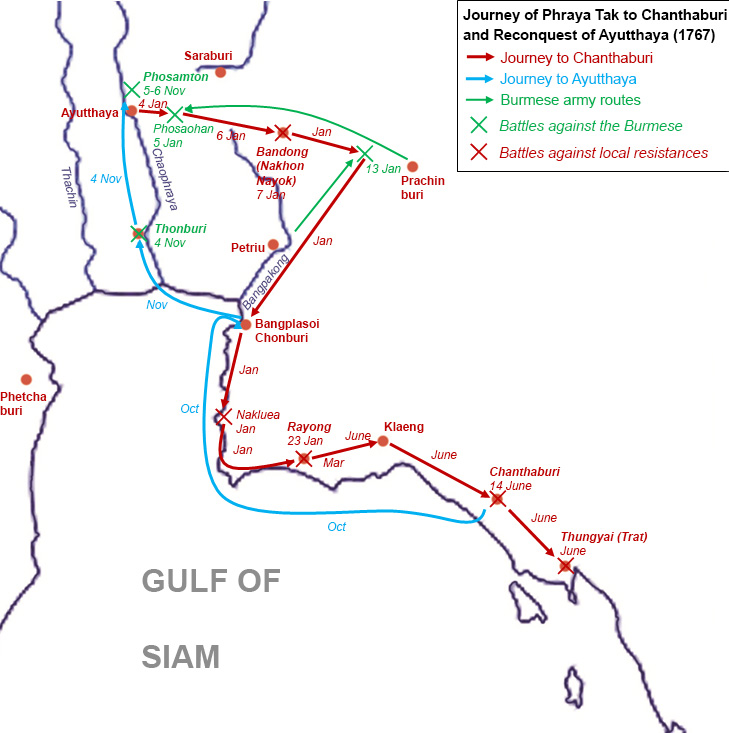
Journey of Phraya Tak from Ayutthaya to Chanthaburi and his return to reconquer Ayutthaya in 1767, according to traditional Thai historiography.

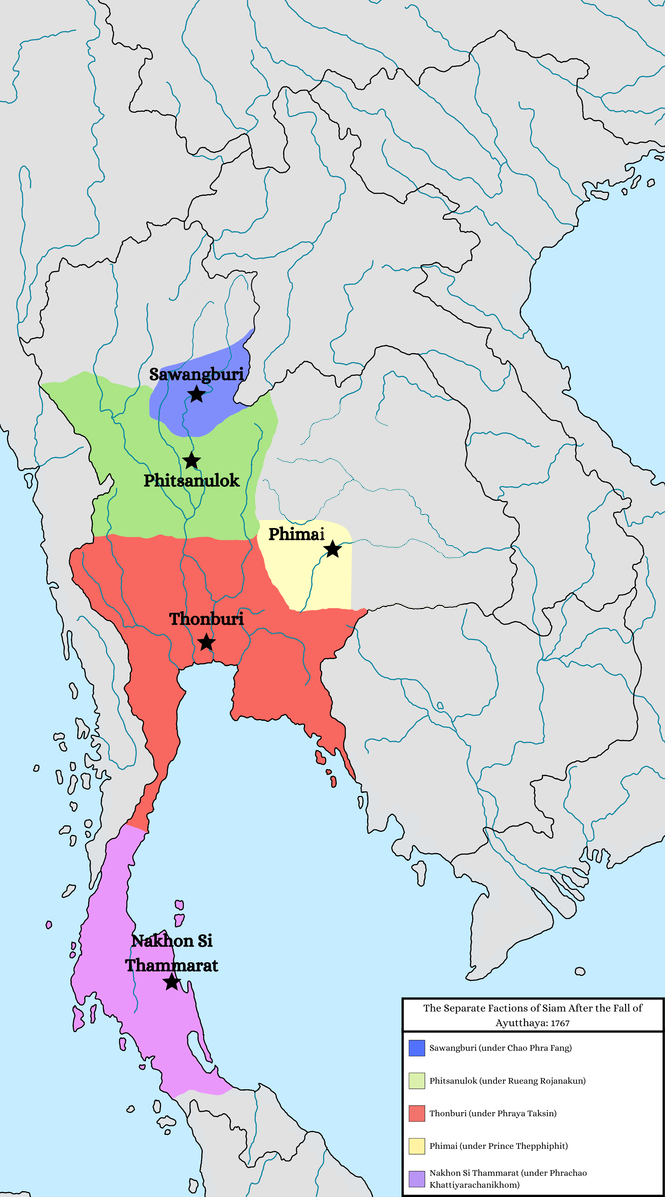
The five states that emerged following the dissolution of the Ayutthaya Kingdom in 1767.

Phraya Tak, personal name Sin, Zheng Zhao (鄭昭) or Zheng Xin (鄭信), was a nobleman of Teochew Chinese descent. By the time of Burmese Invasion of 1765-1767, Phraya Tak had been the governor of Tak and called to join the defense of Ayutthaya. In January 1767, about three months before the Fall of Ayutthaya, Phraya Tak gathered his own forces of 500 followers and broke through the Burmese encirclement to the east. After battling with Burmese scouting forces and some local resistances, Phraya Tak and his retinue settled in Rayong on the eastern Siamese coast. There, Phraya Tak competed with Pu Lan the Phraya Chanthaburi or the governor of Chanthaburi for domination over the eastern coastline. In the famous episode, Phraya Tak ordered all cooking pots in the supplies to be destroyed and then successfully took Chanthaburi in June 1767. Phraya Tak established his dominions of influence on the eastern coast stretching from Bang Plasoi (Chonburi) to Trat.

Ayutthaya fell in April 1767. Due to the intervening Sino-Burmese War, Burma was obliged to divert most of its forces from Ayutthaya to the Chinese front. The Burmese had left a garrison at Phosamton to the north of Ayutthaya under the command of the Mon Thugyi. The Burmese were in control only in Lower Central Siam as the rest of Siam fell into the hands of various warlord regimes that sprang up. In the northeast, Prince Kromma Muen Thepphiphit established himself in Phimai. To the north, Chaophraya Phitsanulok Rueang made his base in Phitsanulok, while the heterodox monk Chao Phra Fang founded a theocratic regime in Sawangkhaburi. To the south, Phra Palat Nu or Chao Nakhon became the leader of Nakhon Si Thammarat (Ligor) regime.

In October 1767, Phraya Tak left Chanthaburi and took his fleet of 5,000 men to the Chao Phraya. He took Thonburi and proceeded to attack the Burmese at Phosamton in November, defeating the Burmese commander Thugyi or Suki. Phraya Tak founded the new Siamese capital at Thonburi and enthroned himself as king there in December 1767. He is colloquially and posthumously known as King Taksin, combining his title Phraya Tak and his name Sin. For strategic reasons, Taksin decided to move the capital from Ayutthaya to Thonburi, making it easier for commerce. Six months after the Fall of Ayutthaya, Taksin managed to reconquer and establish his powers in Central Siam. A Burmese force from Tavoy arrived to attack the Chinese encampment of Bangkung in Samut Songkhram. King Taksin repelled the Burmese in the Battle of Bangkung in 1768.

King Taksin then went on his campaigns against other competing rival regimes to unify Siam. He first moved against Phitsanulok in the north in 1768 but was defeated at Koeichai with Taksin himself got shot at his leg. Thonburi went on to conquer the Phimai regime in the northeast in 1768 and the Nakhon Si Thammarat regime in October 1769. Prince Thepphiphit was executed but Nakhon Nu of Ligor was allowed to live in custody. In the north, Chao Phra Fang conquered and incorporated the Phitsanulok regime in 1768, becoming a formidable opponent of Taksin. In 1770, the forces of Chao Phra Fang penetrated south as far as Chainat. King Taksin, in retaliation, led the Thonburi armies to capture Phitsanulok in August 1770. Thonburi forces continued north to seize Sawangkhaburi. Chao Phra Fang escaped and disappeared from history. With the conquest of the last rival regime by 1770, Taksin's position as the ruler of Siam was assured and Siam was unified at last.

=== Invasion of Cambodia and Hà Tiên ===
In the eighteenth century, the port city of Hà Tiên, ruled by the Cantonese Mạc Thiên Tứ, arose to become the economic centre of the Gulf of Siam. After the fall of Ayutthaya, two Ayutthayan princes: Prince Chao Sisang and Prince Chao Chui, took refuge at Oudong the royal city of Cambodia and Hà Tiên, respectively. The Qing Chinese court at Beijing refused to recognize King Taksin as the ruler of Siam in Chinese tributary system because Mạc Thiên Tứ had told Beijing that the remaining descendants of the Ayutthayan dynasty were with him in Hà Tiên. In 1769, King Taksin urged the pro-Vietnamese King Ang Ton of Cambodia to send tributes to Siam. Ang Ton refused and Taksin sent armies to invade Cambodia in 1769 but did not meet with success.

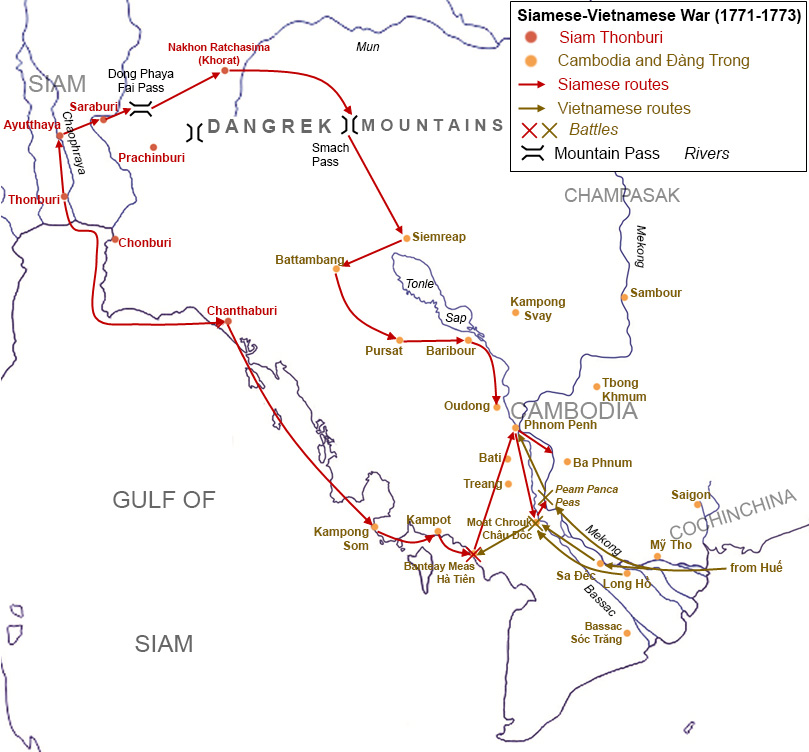
Siamese invasion of Cambodia and Hà Tiên in 1771 and Vietnamese counter-offensives in 1772.

In 1771, Taksin resumed his campaigns to invade Cambodia and Hà Tiên in order to find the Ayutthayan princes and to put the pro-Siamese Ang Non on the Cambodian throne. King Taksin ordered Phraya Yommaraj Thongduang (later King Rama I) to bring the army of 10,000 men to invade Cambodia by land, while King Taksin himself with Phraya Phiphit Chen Lian (陳聯, called Trần Liên in Vietnamese sources) as the admiral invaded Hà Tiên with the fleet of 15,000 men. Hà Tiên fell to Siamese invaders in November 1771. Phraya Yommaraj was also able to seize control of Oudong and Cambodia. Both Mạc Thiên Tứ and the Cambodian king Ang Ton fled to Cochinchina under the protection from the Nguyen Lord. Taksin appointed Chen Lian as the new governor of Hà Tiên with the title of Phraya Rachasetthi. The Siamese armies continued in search for Mạc Thiên Tứ and Ang Ton but were defeated by Vietnamese forces at Châu Đốc. Taksin put Ang Non in power in Cambodia with himself returning to Thonburi in December 1771, leaving Chen Lian in Hà Tiên and Phraya Yommaraj to be in charge in Cambodia.

Prince Chui was captured and brought to be executed at Thonburi, while Prince Sisang died in 1772. The Nguyen Lord Nguyễn Phúc Thuần organized the Vietnamese counter-offensives in order to restore Mạc Thiên Tứ and Ang Ton to their former positions. Chen Lian, the Siam-appointed governor of Hà Tiên, was defeated and left Hà Tiên for three days until he managed to raise a fleet to retake the city. The Vietnamese commander Nguyễn Cửu Đàm led the armies to seize control of Phnom Penh and Cambodia in July 1772, prompting Ang Non to move to Kampot. However, this Siamese-Vietnamese War coincided with the uprising of the Tây Sơn, which began in 1771, against the Nguyen Lord's regime. Instability at home made the Nguyen Lord order Mạc Thiên Tứ to make peace with Siam in 1773. Taksin then realized that the Siamese control over Cambodia and Hà Tiên was untenable. He ordered the withdrawal of Siamese troops from Cambodia and Hà Tiên in 1773 but not before 10,000 Cambodians were taken as captives to Siam.

Ang Ton resumed his rule in Cambodia. With the Vietnamese support dwindling due to the Tây Sơn uprising, however, Ang Ton decided to reconcile with his rival Ang Non and with Siam. Ang Ton abdicated in 1775 in favor of Ang Non, who became the new pro-Siamese King of Cambodia. With the Ayutthayan princes gone, the Qing court had improved attitudes towards Taksin.The Qing finally recognized Taksin as Wang (王) or King or the ruler of Siam in 1777 in the Chinese tributary system.

=== Conquest of Lanna ===
After the Burmese conquest of Lanna (modern Northern Thailand) in 1763, Lanna including Chiang Mai returned to the Burmese rule. Thado Mindin the Burmese governor of Chiang Mai oppressed the local Lanna nobles. King Taksin marched against the Burmese-held Chiang Mai in 1771 but failed to take the city. In Chiang Mai, Thado Mindin faced opposition from Phaya Chaban Boonma, the native Lanna noble who led the resistance against Burmese domination.

In 1772, King Hsinbyushin of the Burmese Konbaung dynasty realized that Siam had recovered and arose powerful under Thonburi regime. Hsinbyushin initiated a new campaign against Siam. He ordered troops to be gathered in Burmese Chiang Mai and the Mon town of Martaban in order to invade Siam from both the north and the west in two directions: a similar approach to the invasion of 1765-1767. In 1774, Binnya Sein, a nephew of Binnya Dala the last king of Hanthawaddy, led a failed Mon rebellion against Burma, resulting in the mass exodus of thousands of Mon people into Siam. Hsinbyushin appointed Maha Thiha Thura, the renowned general from the Sino-Burmese War, to be the supreme commander of the new campaigns and assigned Nemyo Thihapate, the Burmese general who had previously conquered Ayutthaya in 1767, to be in charge of Burmese forces in Lanna.

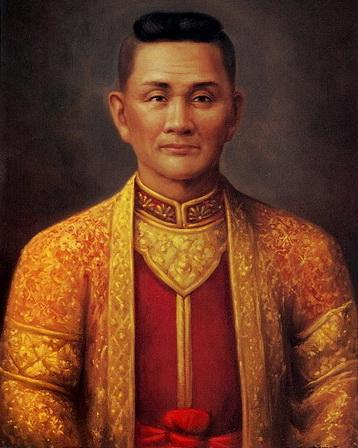
Kawila of Lampang, vassal lord of Lampang to Taksin and the first two Chakri monarchs, helped to repopulate Lan Na in the late 18th-early 19th centuries

The Burmese forces from Chiang Mai attacked the Northern Siamese border towns of Sawankhalok in 1771 and Phichai in 1772-1773. Taksin was then resolved to extinguish Burmese threat from the north once and for all by conducting an expedition to seize the Burmese-held Chiang Mai in December 1774. This expedition to the north coincided with the Mon refugee situation. Phaya Chaban of Chiang Mai, upon learning of the Siamese invasion, joined with Kawila of Lampang to overthrow the Burmese. Phaya Chaban, under the guise of navigation, ran to submit to Taksin. King Taksin marched to Tak where he received the Mon refugees. Taksin ordered Chaophraya Chakri to lead the vanguard to Lampang, where Kawila had earlier insurrected against the Burmese. Kawila led the way for the Siamese armies to Chiang Mai. The brothers Chaophraya Chakri and Surasi combined forces to successfully seize Chiang Mai in January 1775. Burmese leaders Thado Mindin and Nemyo Thihapate retreated to Chiang Saen where they reestablished Burmese administrative headquarter. This began the transfer of Lanna from Burmese rule to Siamese domination after 200 years of Lanna being under Burmese suzerainty, even though northern parts of Lanna including Chiang Saen would remain under Burmese rule for another thirty years until 1804.

Phaya Chaban was rewarded with the governorship of Chiang Mai whereas Kawila was made the governor of Lampang. In 1777, the Burmese attacked Chiang Mai in their bid to reclaim Lanna. Phaya Chaban decided to evacuate Chiang Mai in the face of Burmese invasion due to numerical inferiority of his forces. Chiang Mai was then abandoned and ceased to exist as a functional city for twenty years until it was restored in 1797. Lampang under Kawila stood as the main frontline citadel against subsequent Burmese incursions.

=== Burmese invasions ===
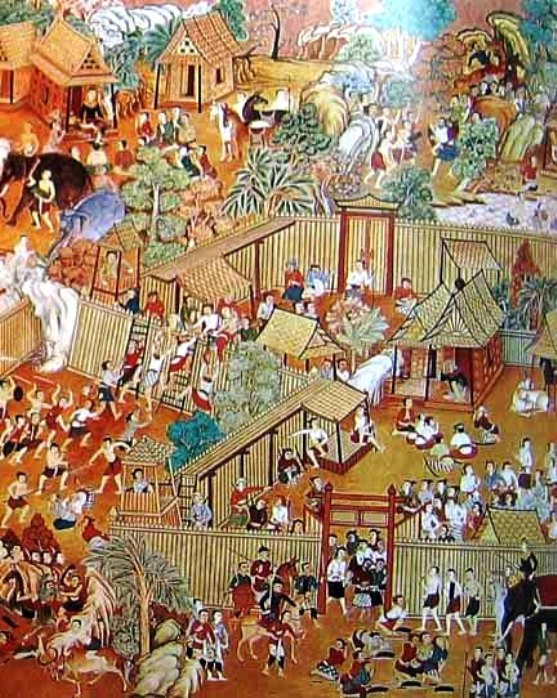
Depiction of Battle of Bangkaeo from the Thonburi Palace.

Plan of King Hsinbyushin to invade Siam from two directions was foiled by the Mon Rebellion and the Siamese capture of Chiang Mai. Maha Thiha Thura, who had taken commanding position in Martaban, sent his vanguard force under Satpagyon Bo to invade Western Siam through the Three Pagodas Pass in February 1775. Taksin was unprepared as most of his troops were in the north defending Chiang Mai. He recalled the northern Siamese troops down south to defend the west. Satpagyon Bo took Kanchanaburi and continued to Ratchaburi, where he encamped at Bangkaeo (modern Tambon Nangkaeo, Photharam district), hence the name Bangkaeo Campaign. King Taksin sent preliminary forces under his son and his nephew to deal with the Burmese at Ratchaburi. The princes led the Siamese forces to completely encircle Satpagyon Bo at Bangkaeo in order to starve the Burmese into surrender. Northern Siamese troops arrived in the battlefield of Bangkaeo, bringing the total number of Siamese to 20,000 men, greatly outnumbering the Burmese. After 47 days of being encircled, Satpagyon Bo capitulated in March 1775. The Siamese took about 2,000 Burmese captives from this battle.

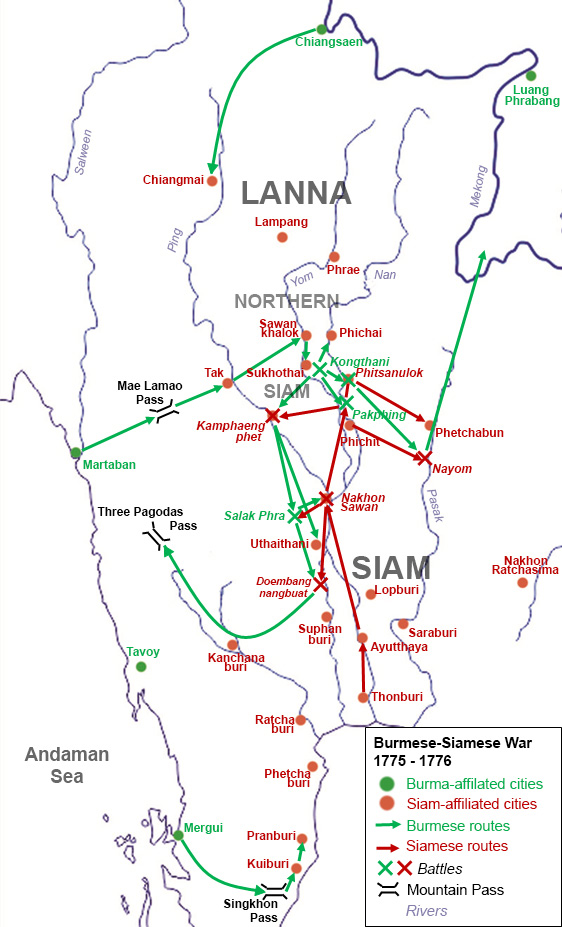
Maha Thiha Thura's invasion of Siam in 1775–1776 was the largest and most intense Burmese-Siamese War in the Thonburi Period, when the Burmese invaded Siam in three directions.

Six months after the Siamese victory at Bangkaeo, in September 1775, the Burmese from Chiang Saen attacked Chiang Mai again. The two Chaophrayas Chakri and Surasi led troops north to defend Chiang Mai. However, Maha Thiha Thura took this opportunity to personally lead the Burmese armies of 35,000 men through the Mae Lamao Pass to invade Hua Mueang Nuea or Northern Siam in October. Chakri and Surasi had to hurriedly return to defend Phitsanulok. Maha Thiha Thura laid siege on Phitsanulok, the administrative centre of Northern Siam. King Taksin led the royal armies from Thonburi to the north and stationed at Pakphing near Phitsanulok in efforts to relieve the siege of the city. Maha Thiha Thura managed to attack the Siamese supply line at Nakhon Sawan and Uthaithani. He also defeated King Taksin in the Battle of Pakphing in March 1776, compelling the Siamese king to retreat south to Phichit. Chaophrayas Chakri and Surasi then decided to abandon and evacuate Phitsanulok. Phitsanulok fell to the Burmese, was completely destroyed and burnt to the grounds.

Maha Thiha Thura was preparing to march onto Thonburi when he learned of the death of the Burmese King Hsinbyushin in 1776. Maha Thiha Thura was recalled, decided to abruptly abandon the campaign in Siam and quickly return to Burma in order to support his son-in-law Singu Min to the Burmese throne. The remaining Burmese regiments in Siam were thus left disorganized and uncontrolled. Siam nearly succumbed to the Burmese conquest for the second time after the fall of Ayutthaya in 1767. The untimely demise of Hsinbyushin saved Siam from such fate. King Taksin took this chance to pursue the retreating Burmese. The Burmese had all left Siam by August 1776 and the war came to the end.

=== Conquest of Laos ===
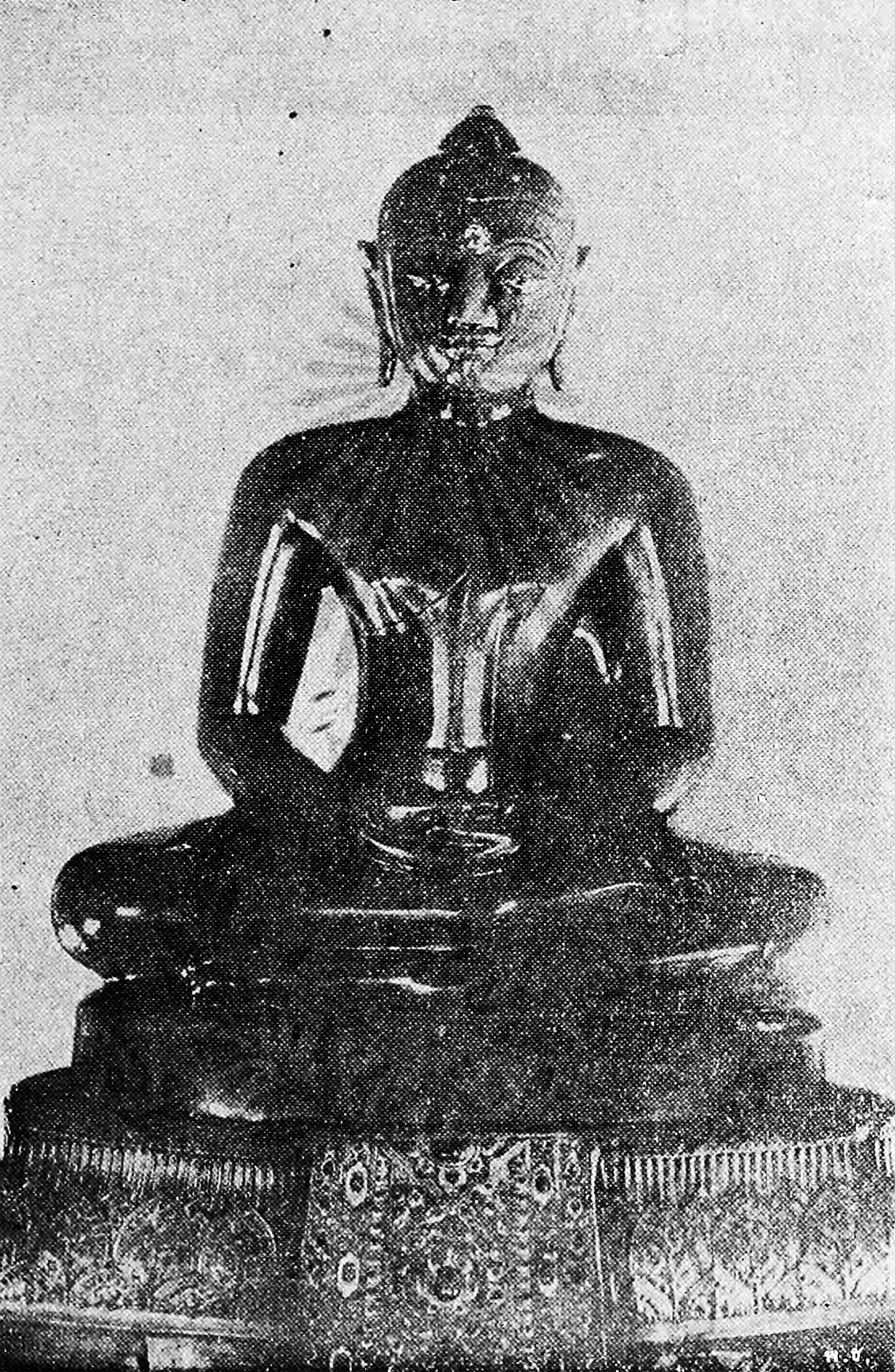
Photograph of the Emerald Buddha without its decoration, taken in 1932

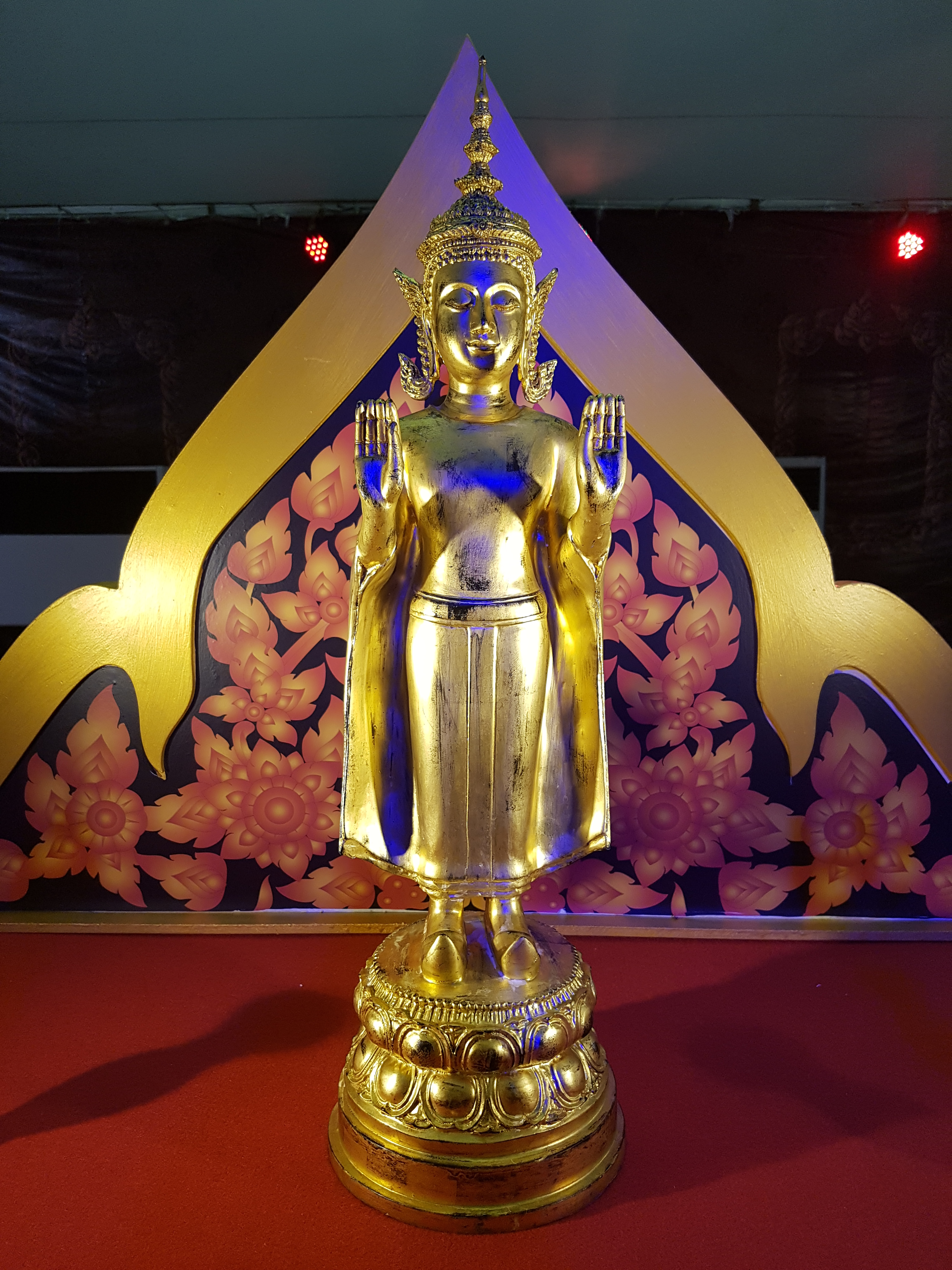
Replica of the Phra Bang Buddha

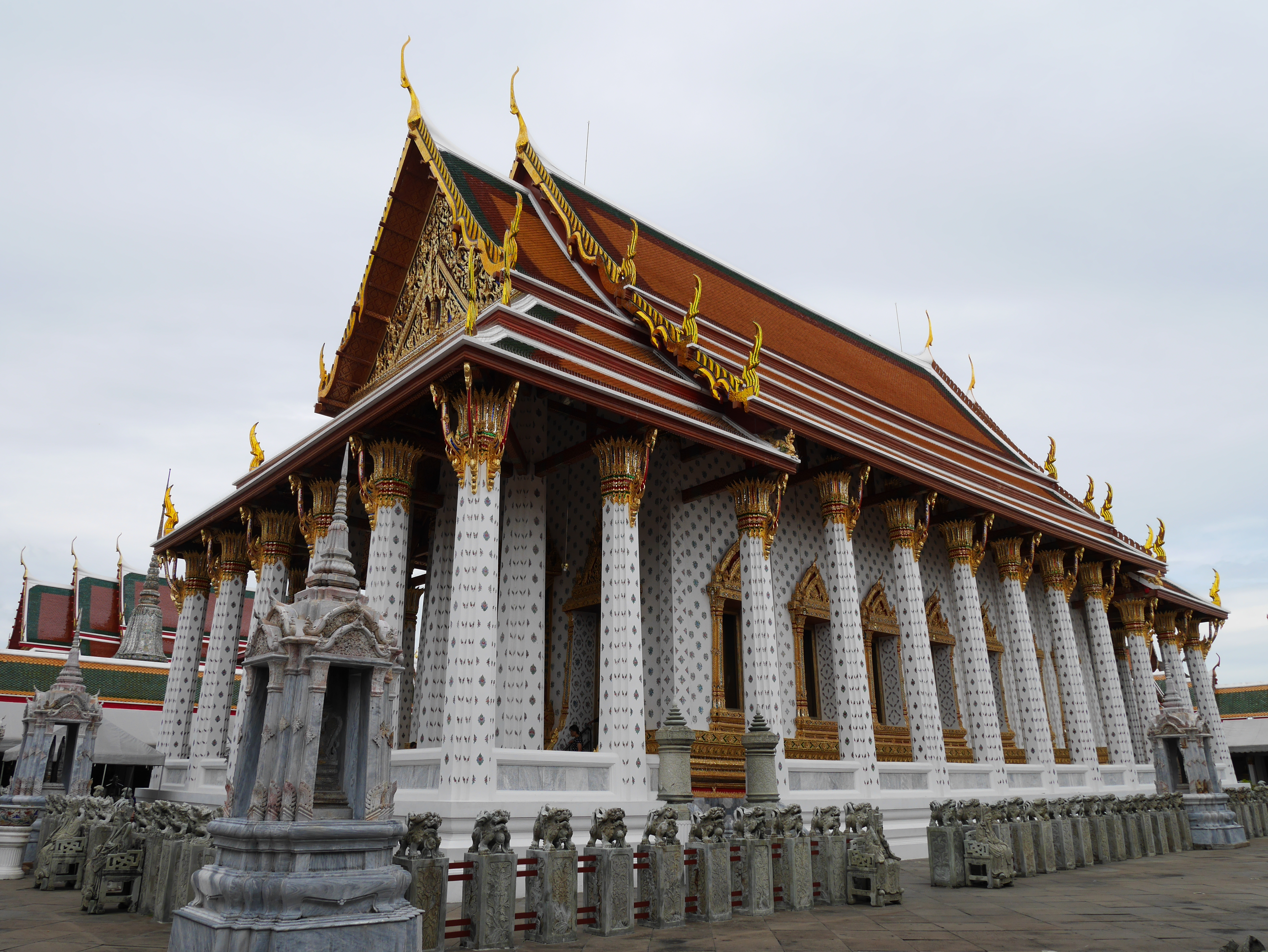
From 1779 to 1784, the Emerald Buddha was housed in one of the wihans of Wat Arun, Thonburi

In 1765, Lao kingdoms of Luang Phrabang and Vientiane became Burmese vassals. After the Siamese capture of Chiang Mai in 1775, the Burmese influence in Laos waned. King Ong Boun of Vientiane had been a Burmese ally, as he instigated the Burmese to invade his rival Luang Phrabang two times in 1765 and 1771. King Taksin had been suspicious about Ong Boun being in cooperation with Burma. In 1777, the governor of Nangrong rebelled against Thonburi with support from Champasak. King Taksin ordered Chaophraya Chakri to lead the Siamese armies to invade and retaliate against Champasak. After this expedition, Taksin rewarded Chakri with the rank and title of Somdet Chaophraya Maha Kasatsuk. The rank of Somdet Chaophraya was the highest possible a noble could attain with honors equal to a prince.

In 1778, Phra Vo, a Lao secessionist figure, sought protection under Siam against Ong Boun of Vientiane. However, Ong Boun managed to send troops to defeat and kill Phra Vo in the same year. This provoked Taksin who regarded Phra Vo as his subject. The death of Phra Vo at the hands of Vientiane served as the casus belli for Thonburi to initiate the subjugation of Lao kingdoms in 1778. He ordered Chaophraya Chakri to conduct the invasion of Laos. Chaophraya Chakri commanded his brother Chaophraya Surasi to go to Cambodia to raise troops there and invade Laos from another direction. Surasi led his Cambodian army to cross the Liphi waterfall and capture Champasak including the king Sayakumane who was taken to Thonburi. Chakri and Surasi then converged on Vientiane. King Surinyavong of Luang Phrabang, who had long been holding grudges against Ong Boun, joined the Siamese side and contributed forces. King Ong Boun assigned his son Nanthasen to lead the defense of Vientiane. Nanthasen managed to resist the Siamese for four months until the situation became critical. Ong Boun secretly escaped Vientiane, leaving his son Nanthasen to surrender and open the city gates to the Siamese in 1779.

Buddha images of Emerald Buddha and Phra Bang, the palladia of the Vientiane kingdom, were taken by the victorious Siamese to Thonburi to be placed at Wat Arun. Lao inhabitants of Vientiane, including members of royalty Nanthasen and the future king Anouvong, were deported to settle in Thonburi and various places in Central Siam. All three Lao kingdoms of Luang Phrabang, Vientiane and Champasak became the tributary kingdoms of Siam on this occasion.

=== Downfall of Thonburi regime ===
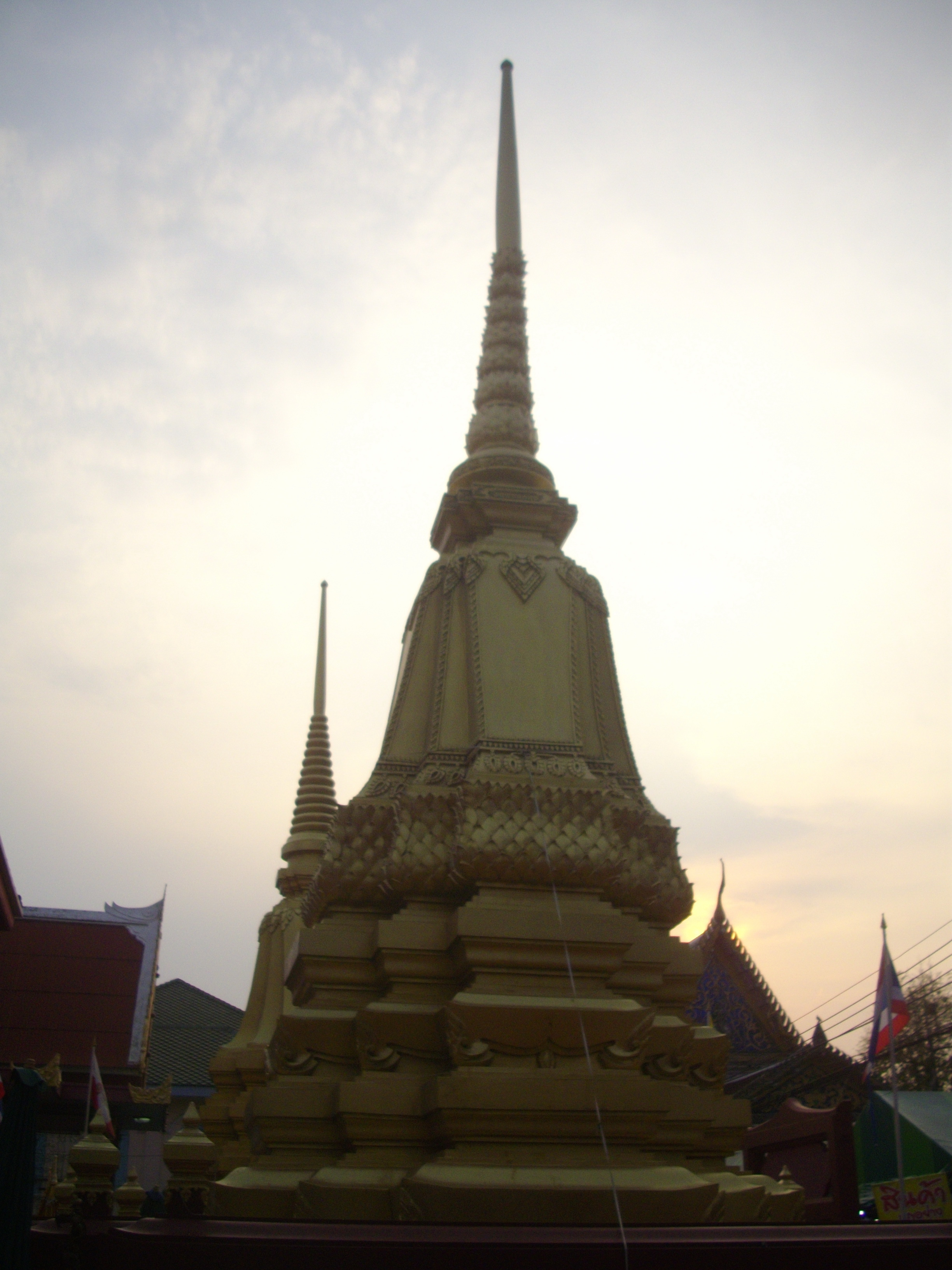
Stupa of Wat Intharam, Thonburi, which is said to contain the ashes of King Taksin

Taksin's ruling style differed from traditional Ayutthayan mystic kingship in the aspect that it was based on personal charisma and merits rather than exquisite grandeur. Initially, Taksin's energy in fighting the Burmese earned him loyalty but as situation progressed some began to notice noncomformity of his rule. He did not erect a great royal city with splendid palaces nor did he actively pursue the old Ayutthayan ways. High titles and commands belonged to Taksin's early followers who were not much of high aristocratic stratum. Taksin's defeat at the hands of the Burmese in 1776 affected him greatly. After 1776, Taksin ceased to personally lead armies in battlefields but instead relegated military commands to the brothers Chaophraya Chakri and Chaophraya Surasi so powers shifted away from him as he focused on religious pursuits. Chaophraya Chakri emerged as the most powerful courtier and came to represent old Ayutthayan elite.

King Taksin persecuted French missionaries in 1775 for their refusals to participate in a ceremony and ended up expelling them from Siam in 1779. A decade of strenuous warfare had taken toll on him. In late 1776, Taksin began to obsess with Buddhist Kammaṭṭhāna meditations. In 1777, Taksin declared before Sangha council that he had become a sotapanna or Buddhist saint and he believed that he could fly. In 1779, the pro-Siamese King Ang Non of Cambodia, an ally of Taksin, was murdered and the pro-Vietnamese Cambodian minister Chauvea Tolaha Mu took power. Taksin's relationship with his son Prince Inthraphithak deteriorated to the point that he banished his son from the palace. His paranoia and religious obsession worsened in mid-1780 when he commanded Buddhist monks to perform the wai to pay respect to him instead of other way round. Five hundred monks who refused to comply were flogged. Also in 1780, Taksin ordered massacre of some fifty Vietnamese people including Mạc Thiên Tứ and Nguyễn Phúc Xuân, who had earlier taken political refuge in Thonburi, for their alleged sedition. In May 1781, Taksin dispatched his first and only official tributary mission to China. In December 1781, King Taksin sent army of 20,000 men, led by Chaophrayas Chakri and Surasi, to fight the Vietnamese forces of Nguyễn Phúc Ánh to restore Siamese influence in Cambodia and to install his own son Inthraphithak as new King of Cambodia. He burnt a court lady alive, suspecting that she had stolen from his treasury and falsely punished around three hundred people, for their alleged smuggling of rice and salt, at the instigation of two corrupted officials. Chinese merchants had to renounce almost all commerce, some were even killed.

In March 1782, a rebellion broke out against Taksin in Ayutthaya due to conflicts over treasure digging rights. King Taksin sent Phraya San to quell the rebellion. However, Phraya San instead joined the rebels and returned to attack Thonburi. With most of his troops away in Cambodia, Taksin relied on Portuguese gunners to defend him, who would soon abandon the king. Taksin surrendered. Phraya San forced Taksin to abdicate and become a monk at Wat Arun with Phraya San taking control in Thonburi. Chaophraya Chakri in Cambodia, informed about the incidents, assigned his nephew Phra Suriya Aphai to lead armies from Nakhon Ratchasima to pacify Thonburi. Phraya San ordered Taksin's nephew Prince Anurak Songkhram to attack Phra Suriya Aphai at Bangkok Noi in the Battle of Bangkok Noi in April 1782. Phra Suriya Aphai was about to be overrun by Phraya San's forces when Siri Rochana, Lanna wife of Surasi, appealed to Binnya Sein the Mon leader to assault Prince Anurak Songkhram in the rear, allowing Phra Suriya Aphai to prevail with Phraya San's army retreated. Chaophraya Chakri, having brokered a truce with the Vietnamese, marched to return to Thonburi. He convened a judicial court to try Taksin and Phraya San of their wrongdoings. Taksin was executed for his "improper and unjust actions that caused great pain for the kingdom". Phraya San, his supporters and Thonburi loyalists, total number of 150 people, were also executed. Taksin's son Inthraphithak, Taksin's nephews Anurak Songkhram and Prince Ramphubet were executed but his other young children were spared and allowed to live. Chaophraya Chakri ascended the throne as King Rama I, founding the new and current-ruling Chakri dynasty of the Rattanakosin Kingdom in April 1782.

== Government ==
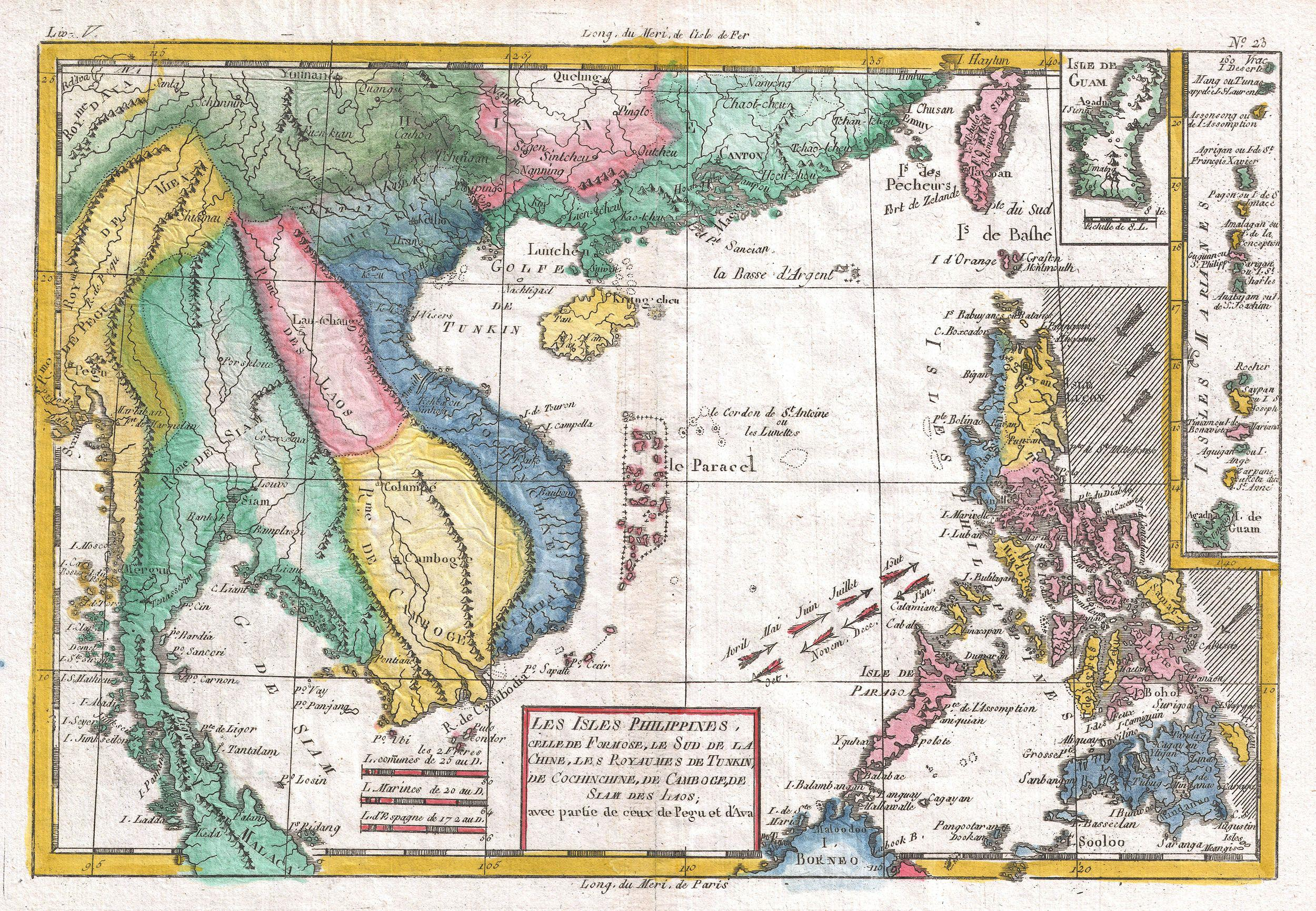
Cartographic map of Southeast Asia in 1780, by Rigobert Bonne and Guillaume Raynal, Siam (green) shown on the peninsula

Thonburi government organization was centred on a loose-knit organization of city-states, whose provincial lords were appointed through 'personal ties' to the king, similar to Ayutthaya and, later, Rattanakosin administrations. Thonburi inherited most of the government apparatus from the Late Ayutthaya. Two prime ministers; Samuha Nayok the prime minister and Samuha Kalahom the minister of military, led the central government. In the early years of Thonburi, Chaophraya Chakri Mud the Muslim of Persian descent hold the position of Samuha Nayok until his death in 1774. Chakri Mut was succeeded as prime minister by Chaophraya Chakri Thongduang who later became King Rama I. Below the prime minister were the four ministers of Chatusadom.

Like in Ayutthaya, the regional government was organized in the hierarchy of cities, in which smaller towns were under jurisdiction of larger cities. The provincial government was an association of local lords tied by personal ties to the king. The regional administrative centre of Northern Siam was Phitsanulok, while for Southern Siam was Nakhon Si Thammarat. After his conquest of Hua Mueang Nuea or Northern Siam in 1770, King Taksin installed his early followers who had distinguished themselves in battles as the governors of Northern Siamese cities. Governors of Sawankhalok, Nakhon Sawan and Sankhaburi were given exceptionally high rank of Chaophraya, while the central Chatusadom ministers were ranked lower as Phraya. Chaophraya Surasi Boonma was the governor of Phitsanulok during Thonburi times. Phitsanulok and other Northern Siamese towns were devastated by Maha Thiha Thura's invasion in 1775–1776.

After his conquest of the Ligor regime in 1769, Taksin made his nephew Prince Nara Suriyawong the ruler of Nakhon Si Thammarat. Prince Nara Suriyawong of Ligor died in 1776 and King Taksin made Chaophraya Nakhon Nu, the former leader of the Ligor regime, an autonomous ruler of Nakhon Si Thammarat. Ligor would enjoy autonomy until the end of Thonburi Period in 1782 when King Rama I curbed the power of the Ligor by demoting the ruler of Ligor to be the 'governor' instead.

With the exception of Bunma (later Chao Phraya Surisi and later Maha Sura Singhanat), a member of the old Ayutthaya artistocracy who had joined Taksin early on in his campaigns of reunification, and later Bunma's brother, Thongduang (later Chao Phraya Chakri and later King Rama I), high political positions and titles within the Thonburi Kingdom were mainly given to Taksin's early followers, instead of the already established Siamese nobility who survived after the fall of Ayutthaya, many of whom having supported Thepphiphit, the governor of Phitsanulok and an Ayutthaya aristocrat, during the Siamese civil war. In the Northern cities, centred on Sukhothai and Phitsanulok, Taksin installed early supporters of his who had distinguished themselves in battle, many of whom were allowed to establish their own local dynasties afterwards, but elsewhere, several noble families had kept their titles and positions within the new kingdom (Nakhon Si Thammarat, Lan Na), (the ruler of Nakhon Si Thammarat that Taksin defeated during the civil war was reinstated as its ruler) whose personal connections made them a formidable force within the Thonburi court.

=== Kingship ===
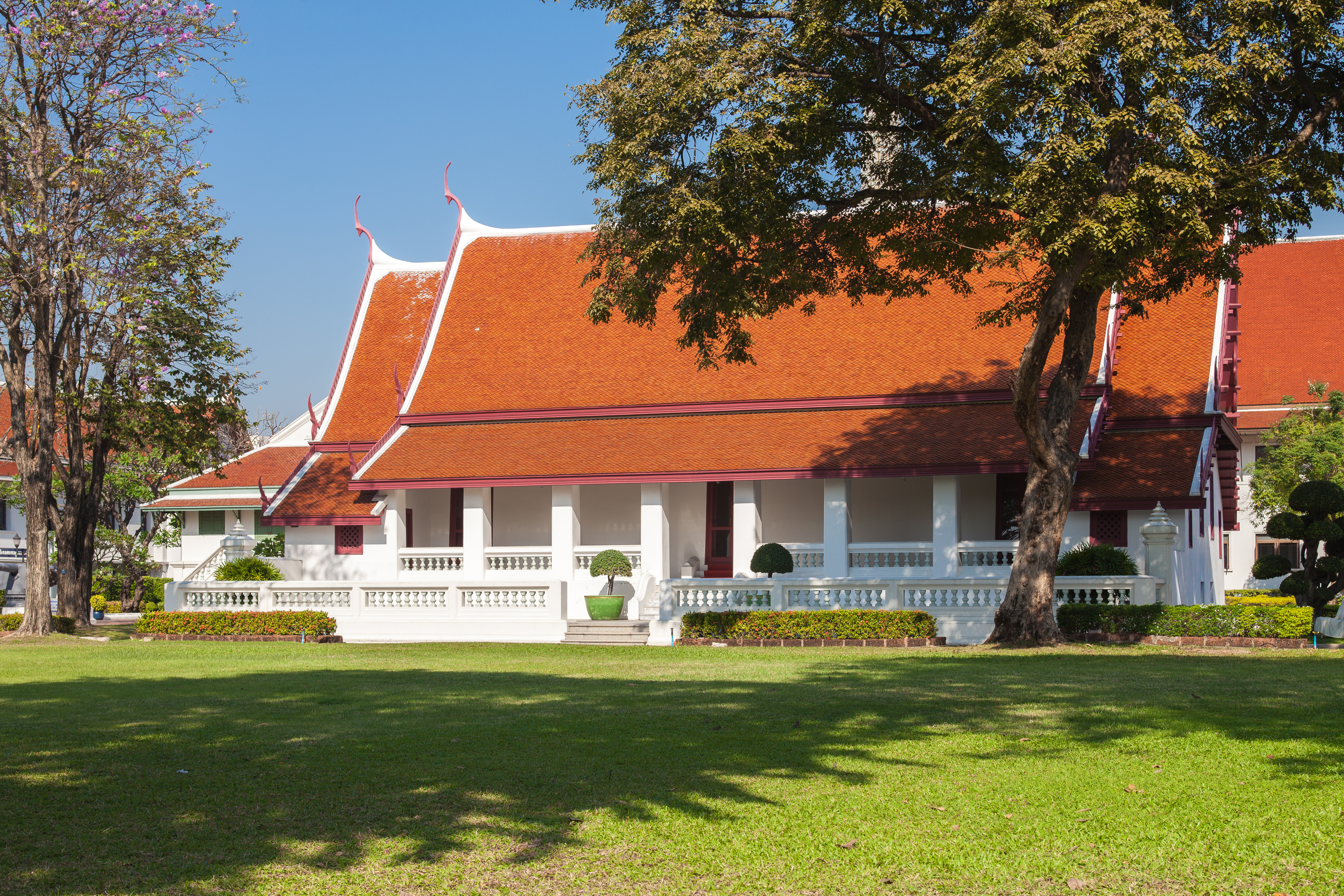
Phra Racha Wang Derm (Thonburi Palace), the former royal palace of Taksin, now used as the Royal Thai Navy's HQ, view from Phra Prang of Wat Arun, Thonburi, Bangkok.

The Thonburi period saw the return of 'personal kingship', a style of ruling that was used by Naresuan but was abandoned by Naresuan's successors after his death. Taksin, similar to Naresuan, personally led armies into battle and often revealed himself to the common folk by partaking in public activities and traditional festivities, thereby abandoning the shroud of mysticism as adopted by many Ayutthaya monarchs. Also similar to Naresuan, Taksin was known for being a cruel and authoritarian monarch. Taksin reigned rather plainly, doing little to emphasize his new capital as the spiritual successor to Ayutthaya and adopted an existing wat besides his palace, Wat Jaeng (also spelled Wat Chaeng, later Wat Arun), as the principal temple of his kingdom. Taksin largely emphasized the building of moats and defensive walls in Thonburi, all while only building a modest Chinese-style residence and adding a pavilion to house the Emerald Buddha and Phra Bang images at Wat Jaeng, recently taken in 1778 from the Lao states (Vientiane and Luang Prabang, respectively).

=== Territories ===
After the Fall of Ayutthaya in 1767, the Siamese mandala system was in disarray and its former tributary states faced political uncertainties. The Malay sultanates that used to pay bunga mas tributes to Ayutthaya initially nullified their tributary ties and refused any further allegiance. After the establishment of Thonburi and the momentous rebirth of Siam, the sultanates of Pattani, Terengganu and possibly Kedah sent tributes to Thonburi in 1769. Francis Light mentioned that Kedah had sent tributes to Siam but did not specify a year. Despite the bunga mas tributes, the degree of actual Siamese control over the Malay sultanates in the Thonburi Period was doubtful. King Taksin requested military and monetary obligations from Pattani, Kelantan and Terengganu to aid Siam against the Burmese invasion in 1776. However, the Malay sultans ignored this order and did not face any repercussions. In 1777, Nakhon Nu the ruler of Ligor proposed to King Taksin to send expedition to subjugate the Malay sultanates. King Taksin refused, however, stating that the defense of frontiers against Burmese incursions was more of priority. Siam only resumed real political control over the Northern Malay sultanates in 1786 in the Rattanakosin Period.

With the exception of the western Tenasserim Coast, the Thonburi Kingdom reconquered most of the land previously held under the Ayutthaya Kingdom and expanded Siam to its greatest territorial extent up to that point. During the Thonburi period, Siam acquired new Prathetsarats or tributary kingdoms. Thonburi took control of Lanna in 1775, ending the 200 years of Burmese vassalage, which became Northern Thailand today. Taksin appointed his supporters against the Burmese, Phaya Chaban and Kawila, as the governors of Chiang Mai and Lampang respectively in 1775. The princedom of Nan also came under the power of Thonburi in 1775. However, Burma pushed on an intensive campaign to reclaim lost Lanna territories, resulting in the abandonment of Chiang Mai in 1777 and Nan in 1775 due to Burmese threats. Only Lampang under Kawila stood as the forefront citadel against Burmese incursions.

After the capture of Vientiane in 1779, all of the three Lao kingdoms of Luang Phrabang, Vientiane and Champasak became tributary kingdoms under Siamese suzerainty. King Taksin appointed the Lao prince Nanthasen as the new King of Vientiane in 1781. Vassal (mandala) states of the Thonburi Kingdom at its height in 1782, to varying degrees of autonomy, included the Nakhon Si Thammarat Kingdom, the Northern Thai principalities of Chiang Mai, Lampang, Nan, Lamphun, and Phrae, and the Lao Kingdoms of Champasak, Luang Phrabang, and Vientiane.

== Economy ==
Historical prices of one Kwian (2m^{3}) of rice in Siam (See Thai units of measurement)
Year	Price
1758 (Ayutthaya)	12 Tamlueng (720 g of silver)
1769 (Thonburi)	2 Chang (2,400 g of silver)
1770 (Thonburi)	3 Chang (3,600 g of silver)
1775 (Thonburi)	10 Tamlueng (600 g of silver)
1785 (Rattanakosin)	1 Chang (1,200 g of silver)
1821 (Rattanakosin)	7 Tamlueng (420 g of silver)

In the Late Ayutthaya Period, Siam was a prominent rice exporter to Qing China. After the Fall of Ayutthaya in 1767, the Siamese economy collapsed. Rice production and economic activities ceased. Thonburi period was the time of economic crisis as people died from warfare and starvation and inflation was prevalent. Siam became a rice importer. In 1767, after his reconquest of Ayutthaya, King Taksin donated to over 1,000 desolate people. He also ordered an Ayutthayan bronze cannon to be broken down into pieces to buy rice and distribute to the starving populace, earning him a great popularity. The rice commodity price in Thonburi period was high, reaching apex in 1770 at the price of three Chang per one Kwian of rice. Thonburi court purchased imported rice and distribute it to ease the famine crisis. The port city-state of Hà Tiên was the major rice exporter into Siam before 1771.

Qing China and the Dutch were the main trading partners of Siam in the Late Ayutthaya Period. The Ayutthayan court relied on trade with China under the Chinese tributary system as a source of revenue. The Dutch had earlier abandoned their factory in Ayutthaya and left Siam in 1765 due to the Burmese invasion. The Thonburi court sent a letter to the Supreme Government of Dutch East Indies Company at Batavia in 1769 in efforts to resume the trade but the Dutch were not interested. King Taksin, himself a Teochew Chinese, sought imperial recognition from the Qing Beijing court. However, the Qing court under Emperor Qianlong refused to accept Taksin as the rightful ruler of Siam because Mạc Thiên Tứ the ruler of Hà Tiên had told Beijing that remaining descendants of the fallen Ayutthayan dynasty were with him in Hà Tiên. This urged Taksin to conduct an expedition in 1771 to destroy Hà Tiên and to capture the scions of former dynasty. Only then the Qing finally recognized Taksin as the King of Siam in the Chinese tributary system in 1777.

Even though Siam did not procure successful relation with China until 1777, trade in private sectors flourished. A Chinese document from 1776 suggested a rapid revival of Sino-Siamese trade after the Burmese war. King Taksin employed his own personal Chinese merchants to trade at Guangzhou to acquire wealth into the royal revenue. Prominent royal merchants of King Taksin included Phra Aphaiwanit Ong Mua-seng (王満盛, a grandson of Ong Heng-Chuan 王興全 the Hokkien Chinese Phrakhlang of the Late Ayutthaya) and Phra Phichaiwari Lin Ngou (林伍). J. G. Koenig, the Danish botanist who visited Siam in 1779, observed that Siam "was amply provided with all sorts of articles from China" and that King Taksin made fortunes by "buying the best goods imported at a very low price and selling them again to the merchants of the town at 100 percent interest".

During the early years of Thonburi, a Teochew Chinese Phraya Phiphit Chen Lian was the acting Phrakhlang or the Minister of Trade. Chen Lian was appointed as the governor of Hà Tiên in 1771 and was succeeded as Phrakhlang by another Chinese Phraya Phichai Aisawan Yang Jinzong (楊進宗).

Siamese economic conditions improved over time as trade and production resumed. After the devastation of Central Siam by the Burmese invasion of 1775–1776, however, Siam was again plunged into another economic downturn. King Taksin ordered his high-ranking ministers to supervise the rice production in the outskirts of Thonburi and had to postpone tributary mission to China. During the Burmese Invasion of Ayutthaya, the elites of Ayutthaya found no way to protect their wealth and belongings other than by simply burying them in the grounds. However, not all of them returned to claim their wealth as they either died or were deported to Burma. Surviving owners and other hunters rushed to dig for treasures in the grounds of the former royal city. This Ayutthaya treasure rush was so widespread and lucrative that the Thonburi court intervened to tax.

== Demography ==
Historical map of Thonburi on Chao Phraya River

Population of Siam decades before the Fall of Ayutthaya in 1767 was estimated to be around two million people, with 200,000 people in the royal city of Ayutthaya. It is also estimated that 30,000 inhabitants of the Ayutthaya city were deported to Burma. No direct records exist about the demographic change post-1767 but it is clear that a great number of Siamese people died in the Burmese invasion war and the overall Siamese population plummeted. Central Siam was the most affected region due to its position in the centre of warfare. Large number of people also escaped chaos by living in the jungles unreached by any government authorities. The general shortage of manpower put Siam into economic and military disadvantages. In 1782, the newfound city of Bangkok had a population of around 50,000 people, presumably what Thonburi city had at the end of the period.

Ineffective manpower control had been a problem since the Late Ayutthaya Period and was one of the factors that contributed to the Fall of Ayutthaya. In 1773, King Taksin introduced the Sak Lek Mai Mu or Conscription Tattooing, which had not been widely practiced before, to put stringent control over manpower. Able-bodied male Phrai commoners of eligible age were drafted and marked onto their wrists with small tattoos denoting their responsible departments – a form of universal conscription. Krom Suratsawadi or the Conscription Department would take the task of registering the recruits into Hangwow registers. This Sak Lek practice enabled more effective recruitment and made evasion harder. The Conscription Tattooing would continue into the Rattanakosin Period. The Phrai corvée obligations in Thonburi period was intensive due to lack of manpower. Unlike the Ayutthaya and Rattanakosin Periods when the Phrai served in alternating months and were allowed free time to return to their homes, the Phrai of Thonburi served government all year round.

Thonburi Kingdom also acquired its population through forced ethnic immigrations in the course of military subjugation of neighboring polities. Two major population influx events occurred in 1773 with 10,000 Cambodians and in 1779 with ten thousands of Lao people deported to resettle in Siam. These ethnic migrants were settled in various towns of Central Siam, where the manpower was in great demand. The Cambodians were settled in Thonburi and Ratchaburi, while the Lao were bound for Saraburi, Thonburi and Ratchaburi. People as far as the Tai Dam of Sipsong Chuthai were taken to settle in Phetchaburi. The Cambodian and the Lao people became the major labor force in the foundation of Bangkok in 1782. The failed Mon rebellion against Burma in 1774 propelled another Mon exodus into Siam, numbering thousands of people. King Taksin also encouraged immigration of his fellow Teochew Chinese people from Guangdong in his efforts to solve the manpower shortage problem.

Unlike Central Siam, the Hua Mueang Nuea or Northern Siam, the area comprising the former core territories of the Sukhothai kingdom in the Upper Chao Phraya Basin, was largely spared from the Burmese destruction in 1767. However, the Burmese invasion by general Maha Thiha Thura in 1775–1776 destroyed and devastated Northern Siam. Thai chronicles described available manpower in Northern Siamese cities before 1775 as 15,000 men in Phitsanulok, 7,000 men in Sawankhalok and 5,000 men in Sukhothai. A decade later, during the Nine Armies' War in 1786, Northern Siam was so depopulated that it cannot raise an army to defend itself against the Burmese invasion. In 1833, only 5,000 men from Phitsanulok, 500 men from Sawankhalok and 600 men from Sukhothai were drafted into the Siamese–Vietnamese War, showing significant drop in population.

== Religion ==
=== Theravada Buddhism ===
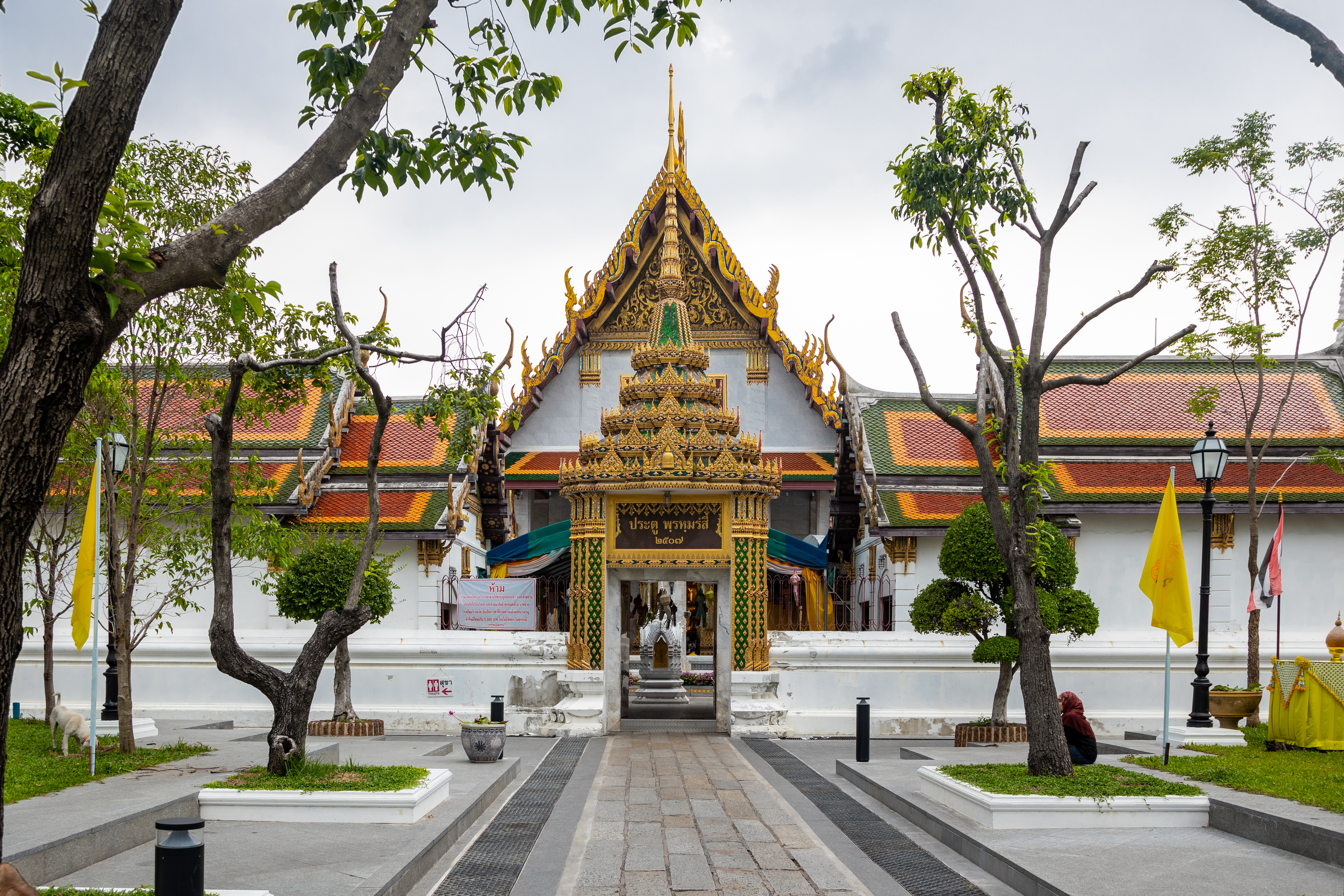
Wat Bangwayai temple, now Wat Rakhang in Bangkok Noi district, was the residence of Sangharaja Si who was the Sangharaja or Buddhist patriarch from 1770 to 1780 and again from 1782 to 1794.

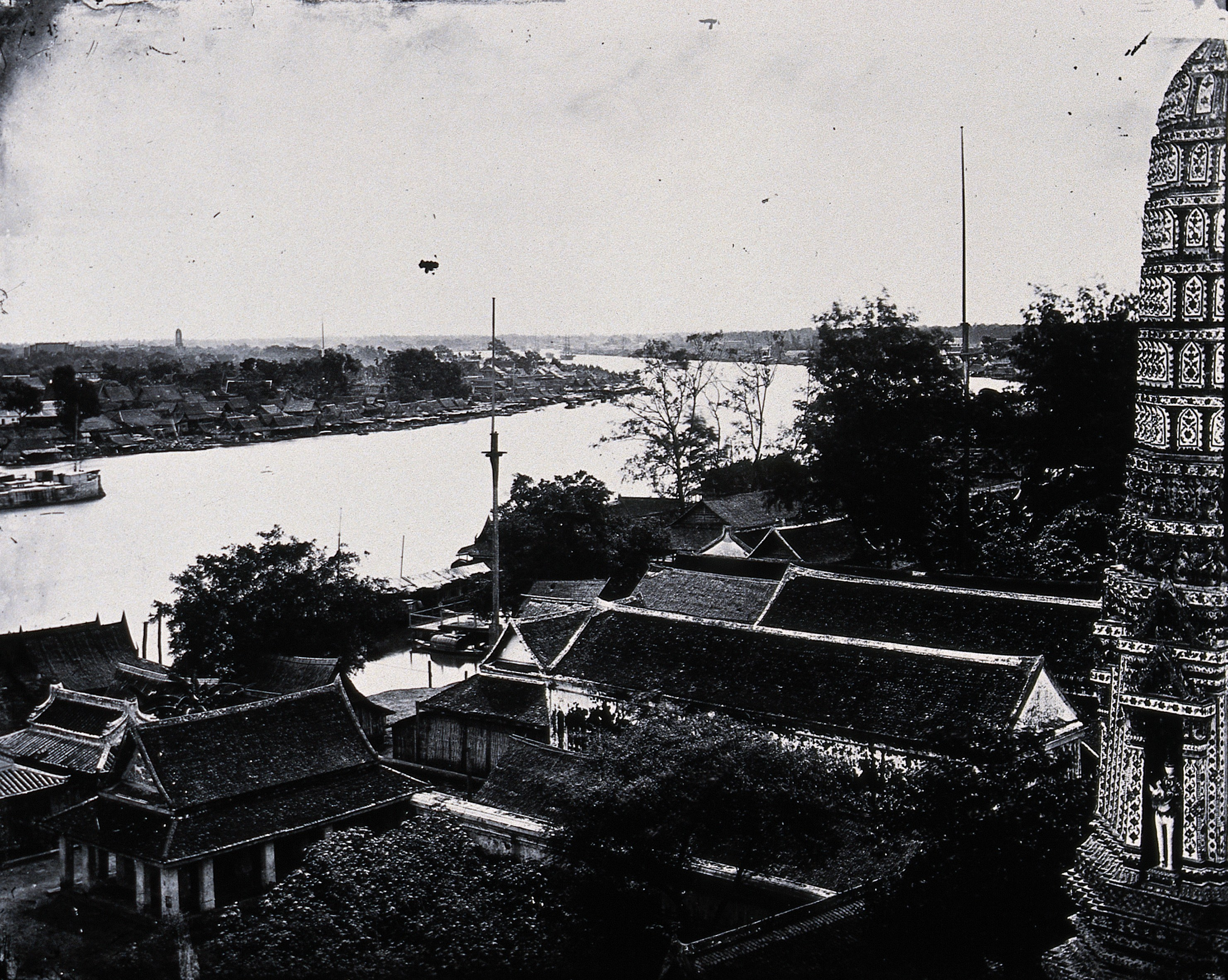
Photograph by John Thomson of the Chao Phraya River from Wat Arun, 1865

After the Fall of Ayutthaya, the Ayutthayan monastic order dissolved and Buddhist monks were left unsupported. King Taksin made efforts, in his reconstruction of Siam, to rehabilitate Theravada Buddhism. Taksin ordered his officials to search for remaining learned monks of knowledge to give them new robes and honor, inviting them to stay in Thonburi. In 1768, King Taksin had the monks assembled at Wat Bangwayai temple (modern Wat Rakhang), where Taksin appointed the new monastic hierarchy in order to restore Siamese ecclesiastic organization and also appointed the venerable monk Dee from Wat Pradu Songtham as the Sangharaja or the Buddhist hierophant of Thonburi in 1769. However, an accusation was filed against the Sangharaja that he had previously collaborated with Burmese occupiers to forcibly extract money from the populace at Phosamton. The Sangharaja Dee was put into a judiciary trial of walking into fire to prove his innocence, which he failed, was sacked from his Sangharaja position and defrocked.

When King Taksin took the city of Nakhon Si Thammarat (Ligor) in 1769, he gave money, rice and robes to the Ligorian monks. He also had Pāli Tripitaka manuscripts from Ligor transported to Thonburi in order to generate copies of Buddhist scriptures lost in wars. King Taksin appointed the Venerable Si of Wat Phanan Choeng, who had earlier taken refuge from Burmese invasion in Ligor, as the new Sangharaja in 1770 staying at Wat Bangwayai in Thonburi. While King Taksin treated Southern Siamese monks generously, he took a different approach on Northern Siamese monks. Taksin believed that Northern Siamese monks were the followers of the heterodox monk Chao Phra Fang, who claimed supernatural abilities and had been Taksin's rival warlord. After his conquest of Northern Siam in 1770, King Taksin ordered massive laicization of Northern Siamese monks. Those who wished to retain their monkhood should undergo the trial of diving into water to prove their sanctity. King Taksin presided over a grand ceremony to purify Northern Siamese Sangha, in which the monks were put to the trials. This perhaps was done to purge any remaining Chao Phra Fang's sympathizers. Then, King Taksin appointed Central Siamese monks from Thonburi to be abbots of various temples in Northern Siam.

King Taksin's ultimate goal was not only being king but also attaining Buddhahood, which mindfulness and meditations were the way to achieve. In late 1776, King Taksin began to actively pursue esoteric Borān Kammaṭṭhāna meditational practices. He seriously studied meditation methods with the monk Phra Wannarat Thongyu at Wat Hong Rattanaram. King Taksin even composed his own meditation manual in 1775. He sent monks to Ligor and Cambodia in search for Visuddhimagga treatise on meditation. In 1777, King Taksin declared that he had become a sotapanna the 'stream-enterer' who had entered the first of four-stage path to Buddhahood. In 1778, Taksin ordered the recompliation of Traiphum – Buddhist literature on cosmology. Upholding Buddhism had been considered royal duties but Taksin went beyond being Buddhist patron by taking the role of teacher and leader of the Sangha and personally practising the Kammaṭṭhāna. In 1780, King Taksin commanded that the monks should perform wai gesture to pay respect to him and lay prostrate before him. Taksin's new stance reversed the usual relationship between monk and king and caused schism in the Sangha between those who complied with the king's rhetoric and those who rejected. Sangharaja Si insisted that monks were always superior to laymen. The angered king stripped Venerable Si of his Sangharaja position and made the monk Chuen of Wat Hong, who supported Taksin's assertion, the new Sangharaja instead. Five hundred monks who refused to obey royal orders were beaten as punishment. Si and other monks were condemned to menial works in Wat Hong, serving the new patriarch. When Taksin fell from power in 1782, King Rama I restored Venerable Si to his position as Sangharaja, praising him for undeterred adherence to orthodoxy.

=== Christianity ===
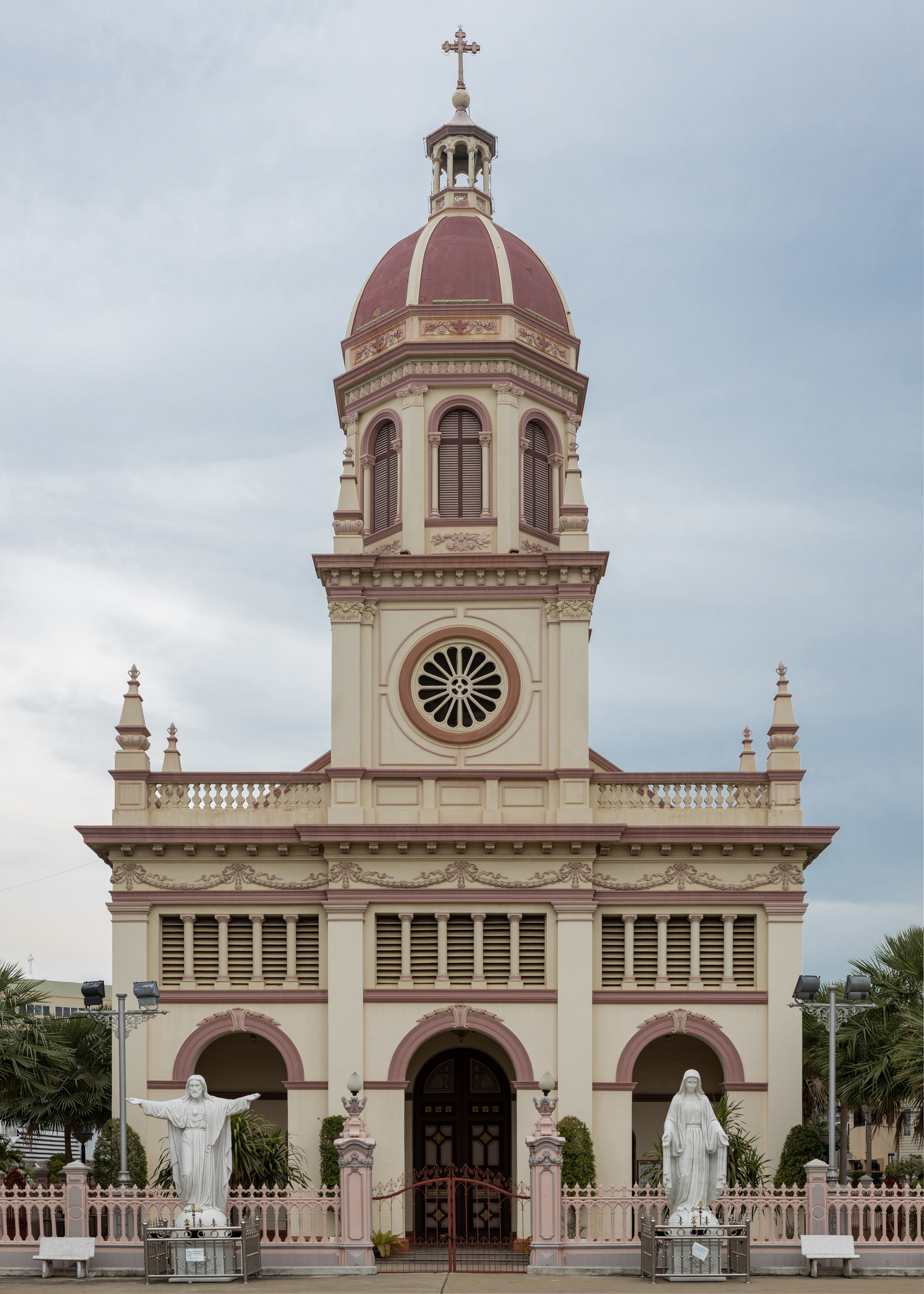
Santa Cruz Church, Bangkok, was founded in 1768 in the Kudi Chin district as the premier Portuguese Catholic parish and would remain the seat of the apostolic vicars of Siam until 1821. The current structure, its third version, was rebuilt in 1913 in Renaissance Revival style.

Pierre Brigot, the apostolic vicar of Siam in Ayutthaya, was captured along with other Christians by the Burmese during the Fall of Ayutthaya in 1767 and was deported to Rangoon in Burma. Brigot later went to Pondicherry in 1768, never to return to Siam again. Father Jacques Corre, a French priest, led the community of 400-500 Portuguese Christian survivors from Ayutthaya to resettle in the Kudi Chin district on the west bank of Chao Phraya. Olivier-Simon Le Bon the Bishop of Metellopolis, a French bishop, arrived in Thonburi in 1772 in efforts to re-establish Christian mission in Siam. In 1772, dissidents who refused to accept the authority of the French mission moved to the east bank and founded the Holy Rosary Church.

In 1774, King Taksin invited Buddhist monks, Christian priests and Muslims to join a religious debate about whether killing an animal is a sin. Christians and Muslims argued that killing animals was not sinful. Taksin was angered by this argument and issued an edict in October 1774 forbidding the conversion of native Siamese and Mon people to Christianity and Islam. The Siamese king became suspicious of the Christian missionaries. Taksin ordered Siamese Christian officials to undertake the Siamese lustral-water-drinking ritual to swear fealty to him. The missionaries found out that the Christians officials had to swear allegiance to the king in front of a Buddha image so they refused to allow those Siamese Christians to participate. King Taksin was even more enraged and ordered the imprisonment of Bishop Le Bon and two other French priests, namely Arnaud-Antoine Garnault and Joseph-Louis Coudé, in September 1775. They were put in cangues, interrogated and whipped with rattan blows. They were released one year later in September 1776 and Olivier-Simon Le Bon was appointed the new apostolic vicar of Siam shortly after. However, the situation for Christian missionaries were still deteriorating and they were eventually expelled from Siam in December 1779. Le Bon retired to Goa where he died in 1780. Joseph-Louis Coudé was made to succeed him as the apostolic vicar of Siam in 1782. Coudé went to Bangkok in 1783 where the new King Rama I pardoned Coudé and allowed the Siamese Christian officials to skip the drinking ceremony.

== Diplomacy ==
=== China ===
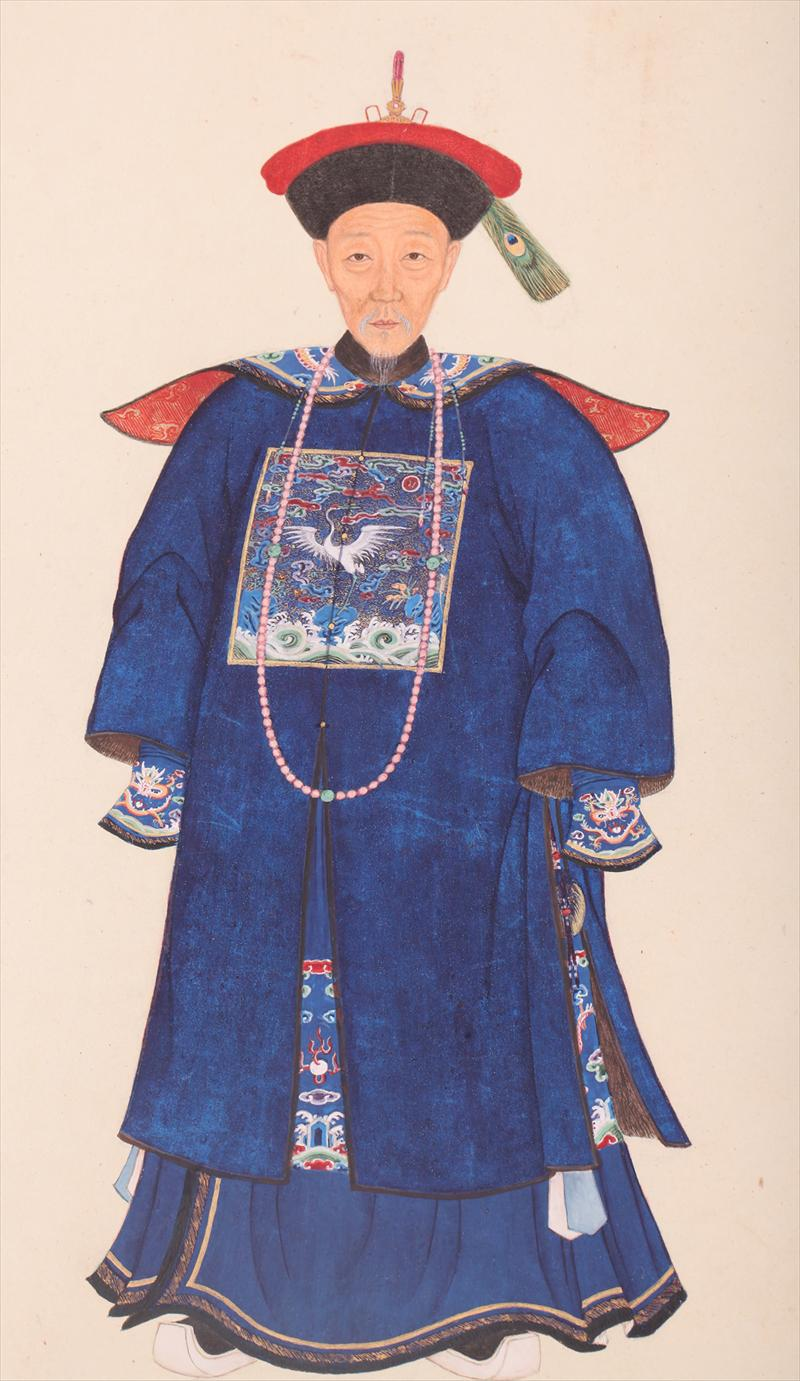
Li Shiyao (李侍堯) the Viceroy of Liangguang

In September 1767, Li Shiyao (李侍堯), the viceroy of Liangguang, dispatched Xu Quan (許全) to either Hà Tiên or Chanthaburi to investigate the situation in Siam after the Fall of Ayutthaya. As soon as he set up his new capital at Thonburi, King Taksin sent his Chinese merchant Chen Mei (陳美) as his delegate to go to Guangzhou, reaching the Chinese city in September 1768. Taksin, addressing himself as Gan En Zhi (甘恩敕), reported to the Chinese court that Ayutthaya had fallen to the Burmese invaders and asked for formal investiture from Chinese Emperor Qianlong as the 'King of Siam' – the recognition that would assist Taksin in his subjugation of rival lords. However, Mạc Thiên Tứ, the ruler of Hà Tiên, also sent a competing mission to Guangzhou in 1768. Mạc Thiên Tứ reported to the Chinese court that the two Ayutthayan princes; namely Zhao Cui (Chao Chui) and Zhao Shichang (Chao Sisang), were under his protection in Hà Tiên. Emperor Qianlong strongly rejected Taksin's proposal in his imperial decree, urging Taksin to promote the Ayutthayan princes to the throne instead and had Li Shiyao give the response to Chen Mei. Xu Quan was reported dead from illness in August 1768 and Li Shiyao had to send Zheng Rui (鄭瑞) as a replacement for Xu Quan in December 1768. Next year, in 1769, Zheng Rui met with Prince Chui at Hà Tiên. Prince Chui told Zheng Rui that he needed help from the Chinese Emperor.

The acting Phrakhlang, in the name of the Thonburi court, sent a letter to Supreme Government of the Dutch East India Company at Batavia in January 1769. The Siamese Phrakhlang told the Dutch that it was the Siamese king (Ekkathat) who had sent Phraya Tak to Chanthaburi. Thonburi requested for some thousands flintlock ammunitions from the Dutch and also urged Batavia to forward the letter to the Prince of Orange and Nassau in order to ask the prince to appoint a new Dutch residence in Siam to resume trade. However, the Dutch, who had earlier abandoned their factory in Ayutthaya in 1765 in the face of Burmese invasion, were not interested in returning to Siam. The Dutch Supreme Government in Batavia replied in May 1769 that re-establishment of Dutch factory in Siam required consent from the Prince of Orange and Nassau but the ammunitions were promised to be sent in the meantime via Chinese skippers. The Dutch flintlock muskets actually arrived in Thonburi in 1770. The Dutch would not reach any diplomatic agreements with Siam again until 1860.

As China and Burma had been engaging in the Sino–Burmese War, in August 1769, Li Shiyao sent a commander Cai Han (蔡漢) to bring orders to Mạc Thiên Tứ, instructing the ruler of Hà Tiên to capture the Burmese. However, Mạc Thiên Tứ instead suggested that the order should be transmitted to King Taksin. Cai Han sent the order to Taksin, urging him to pursue and capture the Burmese. The Qing court then realized that King Taksin was the actual ruler of Siam and began to adjust its diplomatic policy. King Taksin took advantage of Chinese enmity towards Burma by sending fifty Burmese captives, including a Burmese chief, to present at Guangzhou in his second mission in August 1771, addressing himself in the letter as Zheng Zhao. Qianlong proclaimed in November 1771 in favor of Taksin as he realized that the Siamese king could be a reliable ally against the Burmese. After his capture of Hà Tiên in November 1771, Taksin sent the Chinese farmers in Hà Tiên back to their homelands in China unharmed. By 1772, in respect to Hà Tiên, it was clear that Taksin gained victory over Mạc Thiên Tứ diplomatically.

The Qing court made an exception to allow Thonburi to purchase military materials from China, which were usually prohibited from export, to fight against the Burmese. King Taksin sent his Chinese merchants in 1774 and 1775 to purchase saltpeter and other military equipment in Guangzhou. As the tides turned in his favor, Taksin dispatched a mission to Yang Jingsu (楊景素) the new viceroy of Liangguang in July 1777, expressing that he wished to offer the traditional tributes to the Chinese Emperor in full protocol. Qianglong replied by ordering Yang Jingsu to keep the door open for Taksin's regime. On this occasion, the Qing court referred to Taksin as Wang or 'King' for the first time – the gesture of unofficial recognition of Taksin as King of Siam in the tributary system. However, Taksin showed little interest in this huge progress for he had already secured his power as the ruler of Siam and no longer needed the Chinese influence to consolidate his position.

Due to the devastating Burmese invasion of 1775–1776, King Taksin sent a letter asking to postpone the tributary mission in 1778. The first and only official Siamese tributary mission to China in the Thonburi Period was eventually dispatched in May 1781, headed by Phraya Sundhon Aphai. The rituals and protocol were observed in full for the first time after the Fall of Ayutthaya. In February 1782, the Siamese diplomatic mission reached Beijing but Phraya Sundhon Aphai fell ill and died. His funeral was arranged by the Qing court. Phraya Sundhon Aphai was replaced by his deputy Luang Phichai Saneha and set off to return to Thonburi in July 1782. The Qing court finally recognized Taksin as King of Siam and gave the red robes and the Qing royal stamp for Taksin's use as King. However, when the mission returned the regime had already changed as Taksin had been deposed. The new (Rattanakosin) court was officially recognized and invested title by the Qing in 1787 in the reign of King Rama I.

=== Britain and Denmark ===
In 1776, Francis Light the British merchant, in his private venture, procured 1,400 flintlocks from the Danish at Tranquebar and presented them to King Taksin along with other goods as gifts. King Taksin was eager to acquire more flintlock muskets so he had his Phrakhlang write a letter to the Danish. In the letter dated to December 1776, the Siamese Phrakhlang requested for a ten thousand of flintlock muskets from David Brown the Danish governor at Tranquebar, through Francis Light, in possible exchange for Siamese tin.

== Military ==
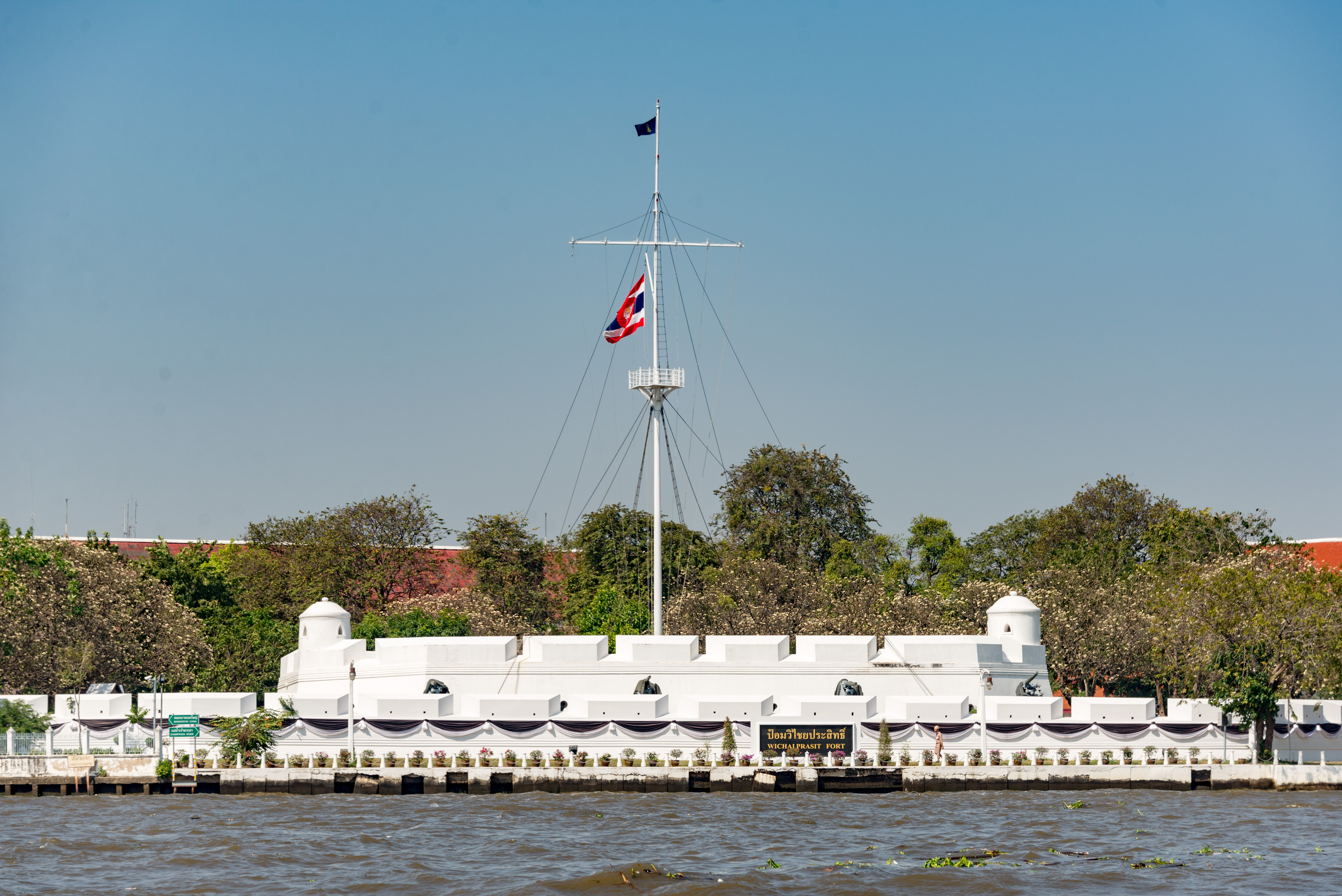
Wichai Prasat Fort, situated in the complex of Wang Derm Palace, now part of the Royal Thai Navy HQ, as it appears today

Much like Naresuan two centuries prior, Taksin often personally led his troops on campaign and into battle. Later on, Taksin would increasingly delegate his chief generals, Chao Phraya Chakri and Chao Phraya Surasi, on leading Thonburi military expeditions, such as the 1781 expedition to Cambodia, immediately prior to Taksin's deposition.

Following the Burmese–Siamese War (1775–1776), the military balance of power within the kingdom shifted as Taksin took away troops from his old followers in the Northern Cities, who had performed disappointingly in the previous war, and concentrated these forces to protect the capital at Thonburi, also similar to Naresuan, placing more military power within the hands of two powerful brother-generals from the traditional aristocracy, Chao Phraya Chakri and Chao Phraya Surasi, who later overthrew Taksin in an elite-backed coup in 1782.

== See also ==
- King Taksin the Great
- Coronation of the Thai monarch
- List of Thai monarchs
  - Family tree of Thai monarchs
- Thonburi province
- Thon Buri district

== Notes ==
— Royal house — Thonburi dynasty Founding year: 1767
Preceded by Ayutthaya Kingdom	Ruling dynasty of the Thonburi Kingdom; 1767–1782	Succeeded by Rattanakosin Kingdom (Chakri dynasty)
