= Bangkaeo Campaign =

Military conflict

- Part of the Burmese–Siamese wars
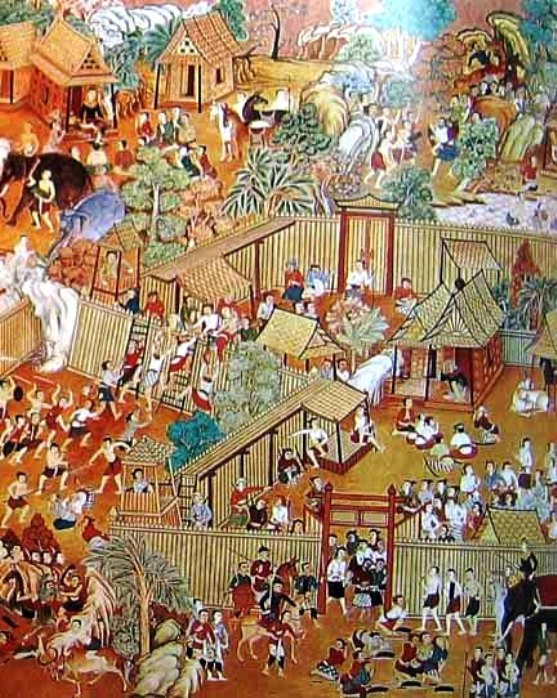
- Painting depicting the Battle of Bangkaeo from the Old Thonburi Palace
| Date | February – April 1775 |
| Location | Western Siam: Kanchanaburi, Ratchaburi |
| Result | Siamese victory |

Belligerents
| Konbaung dynasty (Burma) | Thonburi Kingdom (Siam) |

Commanders and leaders
| Hsinbyushin; Maha Thiha Thura; Minye Yannaung (surrendered); Satpagyon Bo (executed); Uttama Thinka Kyaw (executed); Nemyo Minhla Nawrata | Taksin; Prince Chui; Prince Rammalak; Chaophraya Chakri; Chaophraya Surasi; Chaophraya Nakhonsawan; Phraya Yommaraj Mat; Phraya Ramanwong Madawt |

Units involved
| Royal Burmese Army | Royal Siamese Army |

Strength
| 6,000 | 20,000 |

Bangkaeo Campaign or the Battle of Bangkaeo was a military conflict between Burma under the Konbaung dynasty and the Siamese Thonburi Kingdom under King Taksin in February–April 1775, in which Maha Thiha Thura, the Burmese commander, sent an expeditionary force to invade Western Siam through the Three Pagodas Pass. The Burmese stationed at Bangkaeo in modern Ratchaburi Province. King Taksin ordered the Siamese armies to completely encircle the Burmese at Bangkaeo, resulting in the starvation and defeat of the Burmese at Bangkaeo.

== Background ==
=== Mon Rebellion of 1774 ===
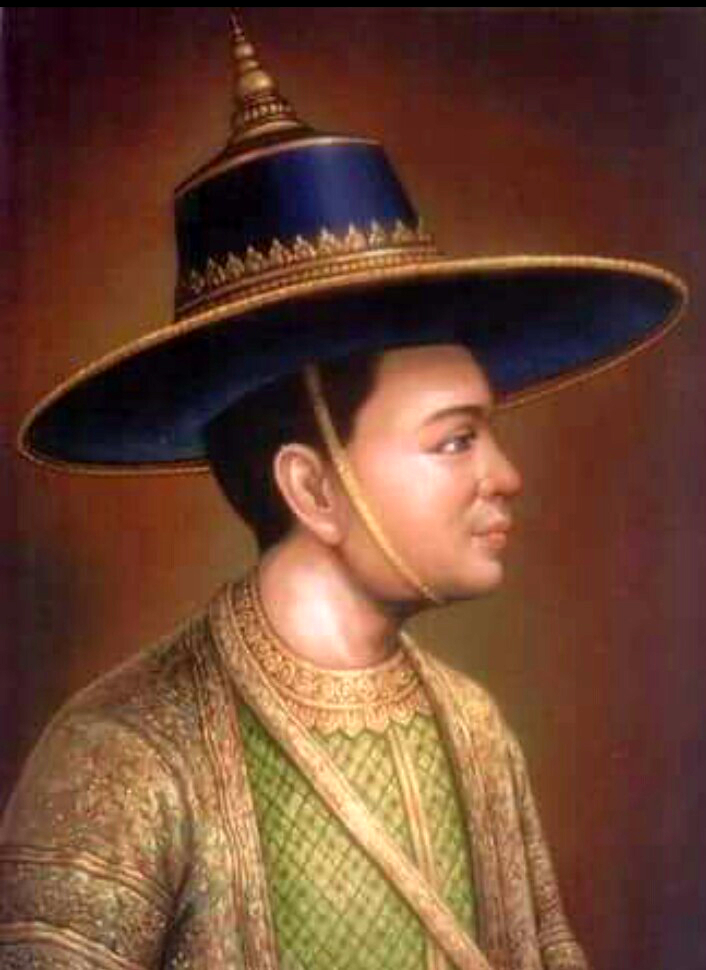
Binnya Sein (Mon: ဗညာစိင် Thai: พระยาเจ่ง; Phraya Jeng), led an attempted rebellion against Burma in 1774 and took residence in Siam. He later became Chaophraya Mahayotha the commander of Mon regiment for King Rama I.

In 1773, King Ong Bun of Vientiane, who was then a vassal of Burma, informed King Hsinbyushin of Burma that, despite the Fall of Ayutthaya and the destruction of Siamese Kingdom in 1767, Siam had recovered and regained momentum under the leadership of Phraya Tak or King Taksin. Hsinbyushin was then poised to curb Siamese growing power. Hsinbyushin appointed Mingyi Kamani Sanda as the new governor of Martaban and assigned him to organize the invasion of Western Siam.

Thai sources stated that, in 1774, Hsinbyushin sent additional troops of 5,000 Burmese men to Martaban and ordered Mingyi Kamani Sanda to conduct the invasion of Siam. Mingyi Kamani Sanda ordered the Mon forces of 2,000 men to go ahead as vanguard. Mon leaders, including Binnya Sein (nephew of Binnya Dala, the former Mon King of Hanthawaddy) and Talakleb, marched the Mon vanguard regiment into Western Siam. However, as the Mon leaders left Martaban for Siam, Mingyi Kamani Sanda forcibly extorted money from Mon families in Martaban to fund the campaigns. Mon leaders, upon learning of Burmese mistreatments of their families behind, decided to mutiny and rebel against the Burmese. Binnya Sein and Talakleb took Martaban from the Burmese. Mingyi Kamani Sanda fled to Yangon. Binnya Sein and his Mon army followed the Burmese governor to Yangon where they managed to take control half of the city but was repelled by Burmese relief forces. Binnya Sein, Talakleb and other Mon leaders took refuge in Siam in their defeat. This incident prompted the massive immigration of Mon people from Martaban into Siam through Mae Lamao and Three Pagoda Passes in their escape from persecutions by the Burmese.

King Hsinbyushin and his retinue travelled from Ava to Yangon in March 1774 to raise the height of the Shwedagon Pagoda. Hsinbyushin went to ask Binnya Dala, who had been a political prisoner in Yangon since 1757, that whether he was involved in this Mon rebellion. Binnya Dala not only admitted but also spoke bad words to the Burmese king. Hsinbyushin was angered and he ordered Binnya Dala, together with his younger brother Upayaza and his son Nga Ta, executed. In November 1774, Hsinbyushin ordered Maha Thiha Thura, the renown general from the Sino-Burmese War, to conduct the new invasion of Siam.

=== Siamese Expedition to Chiangmai ===
In December 1774, King Taksin of Thonburi led a Siamese expedition to capture the Burmese-held Chiangmai. Taksin and his armies reached Tak where he was informed about the incoming Mon refugees and their Burmese pursuers. Taksin met with the Mon refugee leader. Before leaving to the north, Taksin assigned a Siamese troop of 2,000 men to guard against possible Burmese incursion from the Mae Lamao Pass. The imminent Burmese incursion from the West in pursue of the Mons urged King Taksin to press on his campaigns in the north. The Burmese then arrived at Banna. King Taksin ordered his nephew Prince Rammalak to deal with the Burmese at Banna. The Siamese troops were able to halt the invading Burmese at Mae Lamao in January 1775. Also in January 1775, the Siamese were able to take Chiangmai and King Taksin hurried his armies down south to Tak, where he received the Mon refugees. A total number of 4,335 Mon refugees was recorded in Thai source. Taksin then arranged for all the Mon refugees to be transported to Thonburi.

=== Burmese preparations ===
King Hsinbyushin ordered Minye Zeyakyaw, the former custodian of the executed Binnya Dala, and his regiment to join the Siamese campaigns under Maha Thiha Thura at Martaban. When Maha Thiha Thura learned about Siamese military activities at Tak, he chose to send an expeditionary force to invade the unprepared Western Siam through the Three Pagodas Pass. He ordered Satpagyon Bo to bring the Burmese vanguard force to invade Western Siam. Two other Burmese generals Minye Zeyakyaw and Minye Yannaung were to contribute the forces of 1,000 men each to the campaign. However, Minye Zeyakyaw rejected the plan, saying that the force was too small to confront the large Siamese army at the difficult passage and the mission itself was suicidal. Maha Thiha Thura argued that the remoteness and geography of the mountain pass could not sustain enough food and provisions to feed a large army. Conflicts then arose between the two Burmese commanders. Minye Zeyakyaw then mutinied, freeing himself from the command of Maha Thiha Thura and grounding his troops immobile in Martaban.

Maha Thiha Thura then went on his campaigns with his general Satpagyon Bo to lead the task. Satpagyon Bo was chosen because of his experiences in conducting campaigns against Siam during the 1765-1767 invasion. Satpagyon Bo and his second-in-command Uttama Thinka Kyaw led the Burmese army of 3,000 men from Martaban to invade Western Siam in February 1775.

== Bangkaeo Campaign ==
=== Burmese Invasion of Western Siam ===
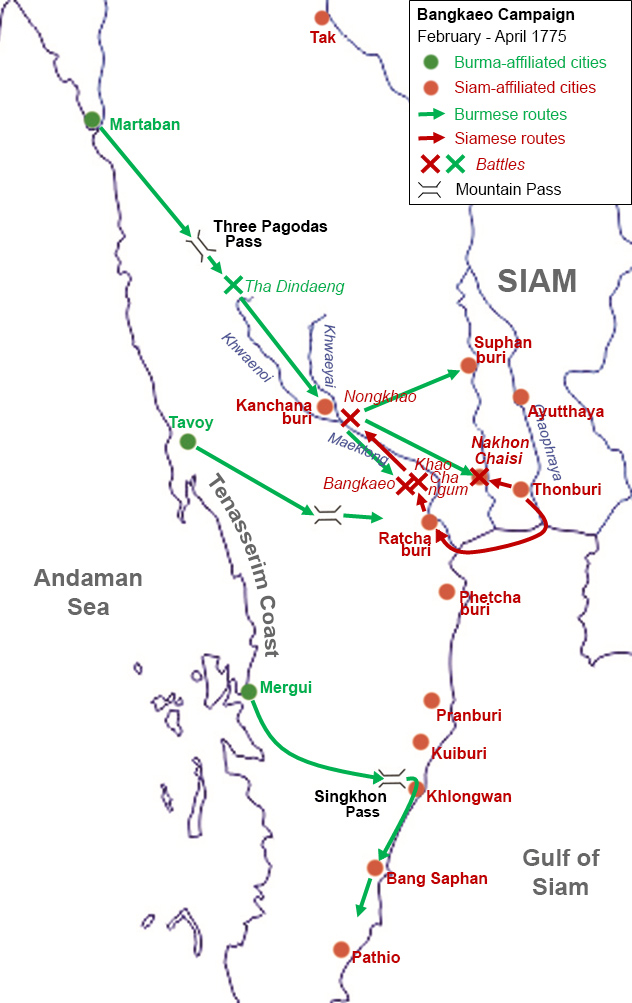
Bangkaeo Campaign: Burmese Invasion of Western Siam. Green represents Burmese routes. Red represents Siamese counter-offensives.

Satpagyon Bo and Uttama Thinka Kyaw led the Burmese forces through the Three Pagodas Pass in February 1775. Then, Maha Thiha Thura sent an additional force under Minye Yannaung from Martaban to join the campaign and to assume control over Satpagyon Bo, bringing the total number of the Burmese invading forces to 5,000 men. Phraya Yommaraj Mat was responsible for the defense of the western Three Pagodas Pass against prospective Burmese incursion. Satpagyon Bo defeated Phraya Yommaraj Mat at Tha Dindaeng. Yommaraj Mat retreated and informed King Taksin at Thonburi about the incoming Burmese invasion.

King Taksin was alarmed by the report as the majority of Siamese troops had been in the north after the Chiangmai campaign. He ordered his son Prince Chui and his nephew Prince Rammalak to lead the preliminary force of 3,000 men to fight the Burmese in the west. Taksin also ordered Chaophraya Chakri, who had been in Chiangmai to protect the city against possible Burmese attacks, to bring the northern troops down south to defend the west. King Taksin ordered that all returning northern armies should not visit their homes in Thonburi, on the pain of death, in order to hurry the forces to Ratchaburi. One minor official happened to visit his home and Taksin brought him to execute by using a sword to decapitate the offending official with his own hands.

As Siam had accumulated a great number of Mon refugees, Taksin established the Kong Mon (Thai: กองมอญ) or the Mon regiment to recruit the Mon refugee men to fight against the Burmese. He appointed a Mon nobleman named Madawt (Mon: မဍောတ် Thai: มะโดด) who used to be a mandarin in Ayutthaya court, as Phraya Ramanwong the commander of Kong Mon or the Mon regiment. Taksin also appointed Mon leaders Binnya Sein as Phraya Kiat and Talakleb as Phraya Ram - commanding positions in the Mon regiment.

Satpagyon Bo quickly took control of Kanchanaburi. The Burmese spread into Western Siam, penetrating as far as Nakhon Pathom, which was only about fifty kilometers to the west of the royal city of Thonburi. Taksin ordered his Chinese minister Phraya Phichai Aisawan (personal name Yang Jinzong), who was then the acting Phrakhlang, to lead the army of 1,000 men to repel the Burmese at Nakhon Pathom and Nakhon Chaisi.

=== Encirclement of the Burmese at Bangkaeo ===
Minye Yannaung stayed at Kanchanaburi as the supreme commander of the campaign with total 5,000 Burmese men. Minye Yannaung ordered Satpagyon Bo to bring the vanguard of 2,000 men downstream along the Mae Klong River to Ratchaburi. Satpagyon Bo and Uttama Thinka Kyaw encamped the Burmese army at Bangkaeo (in modern Nangkaeo, Photharam district), about twenty kilometers to the north of Ratchaburi town. Prince Chui ordered the Siamese armies to take position in Ratchaburi as follows;

- Prince Rammalak brought the Siamese troops of 1,000 men to encircle the Burmese at Bangkaeo on the eastern side.
- Luang Mahathep led the troops of 1,000 men to encircle the Burmese at Bangkaeo on the western side.
- Phraya Yommaraj Mat stationed at Nongkhao (modern Tambon Nongkhao, Tha Muang district), about ten kilometers to the west of Kanchanaburi town, in defensive position against Minye Yannaung at Kanchanaburi.

Prince Chui established the Siamese command headquarter at Khok Kratai, to the south of Bangkaeo. The encirclement of the Burmese at Bangkaeo began on February 13, 1775.

Before leaving for war, King Taksin assigned his other nephew Prince Boonchan to guard Thonburi in his absence. Taksin left Thonburi on February 26, 1775, with the royal fleet composing of 8,863 men and 277 small cannons. The royal fleet left Chao Phraya River and rested at Samut Sakhon before proceeding to Ratchaburi, where he took over his son's commanding position at Khok Kratai. Satpagyon Bo was overconfident in his experience in waging wars with the Siamese and allowed the Siamese to surround him. King Taksin then ordered the Siamese to completely encircle the Burmese camp at Bangkaeo in three layers without any loopholes with death penalty to any commanders who failed. Taksin ordered Phraya Ramanwong Madawt to bring his Mon regiment to station at Khao Cha-Ngum to halt possible Burmese relief forces from Kanchanaburi. Taksin was then informed that 1,000 Burmese men from Tavoy was coming through a mountain pass into Ratchaburi. He then assigned his son Prince Chui and his Chinese general Phraya Rachasetthi Chen Lian to take position in Ratchaburi town to guard against possible Burmese attacks from Tavoy.

Minye Yannaung at Kanchanaburi sent Nemyo Minhla Nawrata to lead an army of 1,000 men to attack Phraya Ramanwong Madawt at Khao Cha-Ngum, leading to the Battle of Khao Cha-Ngum. Phraya Ramanwong was defeated and suffered heavy losses. The Burmese were able to take position in Khao Cha-Ngum. At this stage, the Burmese troops were distributed across Western Siam as follows;

- Minye Yannaung the main commander with 3,000-strong men at Kanchanaburi
- Satpagyon Bo and Uttama Thinka Kyaw with 2,000 men at Bangkaeo, surrounded by the Siamese
- A Burmese contingent at Khao Cha-Ngum

=== Arrival of Northern armies ===
Northern armies eventually arrived at the battlefield of Ratchaburi in Late February 1775. Chaophraya Nakhon Sawan and his army arrived first and he was assigned by King Taksin to retake the position of Khao Cha-Ngum. This time Minye Yannaung from Kanchanaburi heavily attacked Phraya Yommaraj Mat at Nongkhao. The Burmese from Mergui crossed the Singkhon Pass to attack Khlongwan. The governor of Khlongwan requested aid from the king but King Taksin replied that the situation in Ratchaburi was critical and he was unable to provide any aids to Khlongwan. In the same time, a royal doctor arrived in Ratchaburi from Thonburi to proclaim before the king that his mother the Queen Mother Thephamat had fallen ill and died. The Burmese at Bangkaeo, surrounded tightly by Siamese forces, faced starvation and water deprivation. The Siamese gunners attacked the Burmese inside Bangkaeo, resulting in casualties.

Chaophraya Chakri and his army arrived at Ratchaburi in March 1775. King Taksin commanded Chaophraya Chakri to take position at Khao Phra. Taksin then had Mon officials to yell at the Burmese at Bangkaeo, urging them to surrender. Satpagyon Bo replied that he did not fear for his own life but he wished his subordinates to be spared. Satpagyon Bo requested to negotiate with Talakleb. King Taksin then sent Phraya Ram Talakleb, adorned with the honor of noble umbrella and a riding horse, to meet with Satpagyon Bo. However, the negotiation was not fruitful and Satpagyon Bo remained unmoved.

Chaophraya Surasi, the governor of Phtsanulok, also arrived at Ratchaburi. He was assigned to Khao Cha-Ngum. Siamese authorities in Kuiburi and Khlongwan reported that 400 Burmese men from Mergui attacked and burnt down the town of Bang Saphan in the south and the Burmese was heading towards Pathio. Taksin replied that, due to intense circumstances in Ratchaburi, the governors of the southern towns should rely on themselves. In Ratchaburi, Phraya Ramanwong Madawt discovered the Burmese supply line between Kanchanaburi and Khao Cha-Ngum and that the Burmese relied on local swamps for water. King Taksin then ordered Phraya Ramanwong to attack the Burmese supply line. Waves of northern Siamese armies arrived on the battle of Bangkaeo, bringing to total number of Siamese forces up to 20,000 men, greatly outnumbering the Burmese.

=== Negotiations for surrender ===
Satpagyon Bo then sent his second-in-command Uttama Thinka Kyaw, along with thirteen other Burmese commanders and Burmese ammunitions, to surrender to Prince Rammalak and to evaluate his own situation. Prince Rammalak then forwarded the Burmese surrendered generals to the king at Khok Kratai. However, Taksin would not trust the Burmese generals unless Satpagyon Bo, the main commander himself, gave in. Taksin ordered all the Burmese generals imprisoned. King Taksin sent Uttama Thinka Kyaw to persuade Satpagyon Bo. However, Satpagyon Bo persisted, saying that he preferred to die rather than to surrender. Siamese generals urged the king to attack and kill Satpagyon Bo right away. However, the king was resolved to be patient and continued sending strong messages.. Uttama Thinka Kyaw informed King Taksin that the Burmese general Maha Thiha Thura was planning a grand invasion of Siam. King Taksin was concerned by this information and held a meeting with his ministers. Taksin proposed to levy troops from the Southern Siamese cities of Chanthaburi, Chumphon, Nakhon Si Thammarat and Phatthalung in preparation for the upcoming war. Chaophraya Chakri told the king that those southern forces might not arrive on time and the king should rely on available northern troops. King Taksin then ordered those southern cities to contribute rice supplies to the campaigns instead.

In March 1775, King Taksin sent his message, through Uttama Thinka Kyaw, that if Satpagyon Bo continued resisting he would attack and kill the Burmese commander. After many negotiation maneuvers, Satpagyon Bo the Burmese commander at Bangkaeo, finally capitulated on March 31, 1775, after forty-seven days of being encircled. Taksin ordered the Mon officers to stay in Bangkaeo and conversed in Burmese language to deceive Minye Yannaung at Kanchanaburi that Bangkaeo still belonged to the Burmese.

In April 1775, Chaophraya Chakri initiated a surprise attack on Khao Cha-Ngum and was able to reclaim the position for the Siamese. The defeated Burmese from Khao Cha-Ngum retreated to Kanchanaburi where they were punished and executed by Minye Yannaung for their failures. Due to the deteriorating situation on the Burmese part, Minye Yannaung decided to give up Kanchanaburi and retreated his main armies back to Martaban in April 1775.

== Aftermath ==
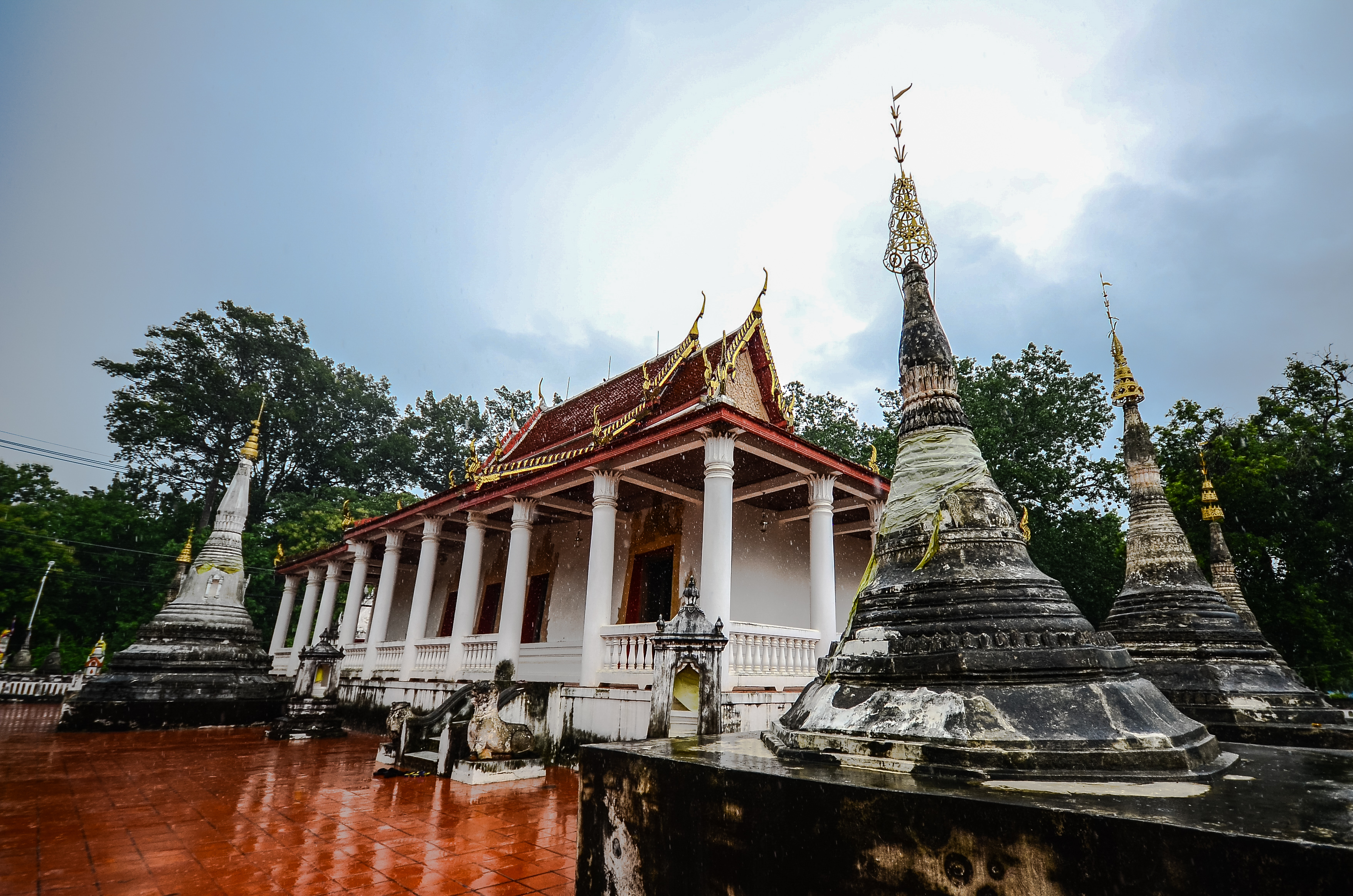
Mon immigrants in Ratchaburi later founded the Bhardaw (Mon: ဘာဒေါဝ်) or Peato Temple in Photharam district in the Early Rattanakosin Period. The temple was later named Wat Khongkharam.

King Taksin ordered Phraya Yommaraj Mat, the head of Nakhonban or Police Bureau, to round up all the Burmese surrendered personnel and brought them captives to be imprisoned in Thonburi. The Siamese took a great number of about 2,000 Burmese captives. Taksin and his retinue then proceeded by riverine royal barge to return to Thonburi.

King Taksin also rewarded the princes with Krom titles for their leaderships in the campaign;

- Prince Phra Ong Chao Chui, the king's son, became Kromma Khun Inthraphithak.
- Prince Chao Rammalak, the king's nephew, became Kromma Khun Anurak Songkhram.
- Prince Chao Boonchan, the king's nephew, became Kromma Khun Ramphubet.

Minye Yannaung returned to Martaban and reported the war results to his superior Maha Thiha Thira. Maha Thiha Thura then decided to put the blame on his mutinied commander Minye Zeyakyaw. Maha Thiha Thura reported to King Hsinbyushin at Ava that Minye Zeyakyaw had disobeyed his orders and withdrawn his troops to Martaban, resulting in the failure of Satpagyon Bo at Bangkaeo. He also told the king that Minye Zeyakyaw had seditious intentions by saying that the king had already died and to be succeeded by the Prince of Amyin. Hsinbyushin ordered Minye Zeyakyaw to immediately return to Ava with his contingent. Minye Zeyakyaw and his subordinates were arrested on his way to Ava by royal orders. Minye Zeyakyaw defended himself by telling the king that he had been abused and ill-treated by Maha Thiha Thura. The Burmese king argued that if that was the case, Minye Zeyakyaw should send a counter-report to explain rather than disobeying. Minye Zeyakyaw was stripped of his noble title, becoming a common man named Nga Hmon, and sent to Maha Thiha Thura to procure punishments according to his nemesis' wish. However, Maha Thiha Thura chose to spare Nga Hmon's life and allowed him to serve in his army.

=== Maha Thiha Thura's Invasion of Siam ===
Six months after the Bangkaeo Campaign, in October 1775, Maha Thiha Thura himself led the Burmese armies of 35,000 men to invade Northern Siam through the Mae Lamao Pass. In January 1776, King Taksin went to ask the Burmese surrendered commanders from Bangkaeo, including Satpagyon Bo and Uttama Thinka Kyaw, whether they would serve and march against the invading Burmese. Satpagyon Bo and Uttama Thinka Kyaw refused, saying that they were too ashamed to face their own former comrades. Taksin then realized that the captured Burmese generals from Bangkaeo were not loyal and not totally submitted to him. They might insurrect in Thonburi if the king left the city to engage with the Burmese in the north. King Taksin then had Satpagyon Bo and Uttama Thinka Kyaw, along with other former Burmese commanders, executed at Wat Suwannaram in Bangkok Noi.
