= Olivier-Simon Le Bon =

French Catholic bishop (1710–1780)

The Right Reverend Olivier-Simon Le Bon M. E. P.
- Vicar Apostolic of Siam
- Installed: 30 September 1776
- Term ended: 27 October 1780 (on death)
- Predecessor: Pierre Brigot
- Successor: Joseph-Louis Coudé

Orders
- Consecration: 28 December 1766 by Pope Clement XIII

Personal details
- Born: 17 March 1710 St Malo, France
- Died: 27 October 1780 (aged 70) Goa
- Denomination: Roman Catholic

Olivier-Simon Le Bon (17 March 1710 – 27 October 1780) was a French missionary of the Paris Foreign Missions Society and was Vicar Apostolic of Siam from 1776 to 1780.

== Biography ==
Le Bon was born on 17 March 1710 in St Malo, France. After joining the Paris Foreign Missions Society he was sent to Siam in 1745 and served for three years as a professor at the Collège Général seminary. In 1750, he went to Burma and then to Pondicherry before returning to Siam where he and Fr Brigot expanded the seminary, adding new buildings and changing the studies.

Le Bon went to Macau in 1754 as procurator of the Paris Foreign Missions Society in the territory, succeeding Fr Lucerne, and remained in the post for ten years. On 22 August 1764, he was appointed titular Bishop of Metellopolis and coadjutor in Siam. However, he could not be consecrated in Macau due to an absence of the bishops, and could not go to Siam to take up the office of coadjutor due to the Burmese–Siamese War (1765–1767), so he returned to France, and was consecrated in Rome on 28 December 1766 by Pope Clement XIII.

Le Bon left France in 1770 bound for Siam but was unable to enter due to the unstable political situation and went to reside in Macau. He remained there until 1772 when he went to Siam. Arriving in Bangkok, he found Roman Catholicism in disarray due to the war with Burma and was joined by two missionaries, Fr Coudé and Fr Garnault. In 1775, Le Bon, Fr Garnault and Fr Coudé refused to let Siamese Christian officials drink the sacred water at the Buddhist temple to swear fealty to King Taksin. Instead they made those Christian officials swear their oath of loyalty in the church, in the Siamese language, on the Gospels. Le Bon, Fr Coudé and Fr Garnault were arrested and imprisoned until the following year. After their release, Le Bon was appointed Apostolic Vicar of Siam on 30 September 1776, and remained in Siam until 1779 when he was imprisoned again and expelled from Siam. He settled in Goa where he died on 27 October 1780.
