= Inthraphithak =

Siamese prince of Thonburi dynasty

Inthraphithak; อินทรพิทักษ์

Viceroy of Thonburi
- Tenure: ? – 1782
- Appointer: Taksin
- Predecessor: Uthumphon (as Viceroy of Ayutthaya)
- Successor: Maha Sura Singhanat (as Viceroy of Rattanakosin)
- Died: 1782
- Dynasty: Thonburi
- Father: Taksin
- Mother: Batboricha

Chao Fa Krom Khun Inthra Phithak (Thai: เจ้าฟ้ากรมขุนอินทรพิทักษ์, ?–1782), born Chui (จุ้ย), was a prince of the Thonburi Kingdom.

He was the son of Taksin and his spouse, Princess Batboricha. He was appointed the Front Palace or Maha Uparaj, the title of the heir. He had military ability and was sent to Cambodia to fight against the Vietnamese by Taksin.

In 1780, the Cambodian regent Talaha (Mu) decided to switch allegiances to Vietnam. As a result, Taksin decided to annex Cambodia. A Thai army of 20,000 under Chao Phraya Chakri (later king Rama I) and Chao Phraya Surasi moved into Cambodia, to crown Inthraphithak the new king of Cambodia. A Vietnamese army of 3000 men led by Nguyễn Hữu Thoại and Hồ Văn Lân was also sent to help Talaha.

It was reported by Western missionaries that King Taksin became half-mad in his final years. He became more and more caprice, and imprisoned, tortured, and flogged his wife, his sons — even Inthraphithak, who was his heir-presumptive. Vietnamese sources reported that Taksin imprisoned Chakri and Surasi's families, which made them resentful. So Chakri and Surasi made friends with these two Vietnamese generals and the four generals swore to help each other when in need.

In 1782, Taksin was usurped and imprisoned by Phraya San. Having made sure the Vietnamese would not attack Siamese with this opportunity, Chakri quickly returned to Thonburi, put down the rebellion, and had Taksin executed.

After Taksin's execution, Inthraphithak travelled back to Siam, aiming to seize the throne. However, few people supported him. In the mid-way, many of his soldiers changed sides, and Inthraphithak had to surrender. He was captured by Surasi, and was sentenced to death in Thonburi.

Intharaphithak Road was built in his honor.

Direct descendants of Inthraphithak use two surnames, Indrayodhin (Inthrayothin) and Sinsuk.

Inthraphithak Thonburi dynasty Born: - Died: 1782
Regnal titles
Preceded by Phonphinit of Ayutthaya Kingdom	Viceroy of Thonburi ?–1782	Succeeded by Maha Sura Singhanat of Rattanakosin Kingdom
