= Joseph-Louis Coudé =

French Catholic bishop (1750-1785)

The Right Reverend Joseph-Louis Coudé M.E.P.
- Vicar Apostolic of Siam
- Installed: 15 January 1782
- Term ended: 8 January 1785 on death
- Predecessor: Olivier-Simon Le Bon
- Successor: Arnaud-Antoine Garnault

Orders
- Ordination: 17 December 1773, as priest
- Consecration: Died before consecration

Personal details
- Born: 4 October 1750 Auray, France
- Died: 8 January 1785 (aged 34) Junk Ceylon, Siam
- Denomination: Roman Catholic

Joseph-Louis Coudé M.E.P. (4 October 1750 – 8 January 1785) was a French Roman Catholic missionary and bishop who served as Vicar Apostolic of Siam from 1782 to 1785.

== Biography ==
Coudé was born on 4 October 1750 in Auray, France. He entered the Paris Foreign Missions Society missionary in 1772, and was ordained a priest in 1773.

Coudé was sent to undertake mission work in Siam in 1773. In 1775, he was imprisoned for several months with Bishop Olivier-Simon Le Bon and Fr Garnault on the orders of King Taksin, after Christian officers refused to drink holy water prepared by Buddhist monks. In 1779, they were expelled from Siam.

After leaving Siam, Coudé went to Pondicherry, where he remained until 1781, and then travelled to 'Port of Queda' at the mouth of the Kedah River, on the west coast of the Malay Peninsula, where he was joined by Garnault. Here there was a large settlement of Christians, mostly Portuguese who had fled the persecution of Christians in Siam and sought refuge in the town, who were without any priest or a place of worship. Accordingly, Coudé requested permission from the Rajah of Kedah to establish a church, and was granted the use of a large house for worship which he named 'St Michael's' church, where he proceeded to hold services in Portuguese and Siamese.

In 1782, whilst on a visit to Junk Ceylon (present day Phuket), Coudé found letters from the Pope and Papal Bulls, dated 20 January 1782, appointing him 'Bishop of Siam and Queda' and titular Bishop of Rhesaina. It was the first time that Keddah had officially been added to the Apostolic Vicariate of Siam.

After the death of Taksin, Coudé availed himself of the religious toleration of his successor, and took the opportunity to visit Bangkok where he arrived in June 1784. However, the Portuguese refused to recognise his powers although officially granted by Rome, and he decided to return to Kedah where he was due to be consecrated by Pigneau de Behaine, Bishop of Cochinchina, who was stopping in the town to perform the service on his way to France.

However, while returning overland from Bangkok to Kedah, Coudé contracted malaria and died in the church in Junk Ceylon on 15 January 1782, aged 34. He was buried at the church.
