= Binnya Sein =

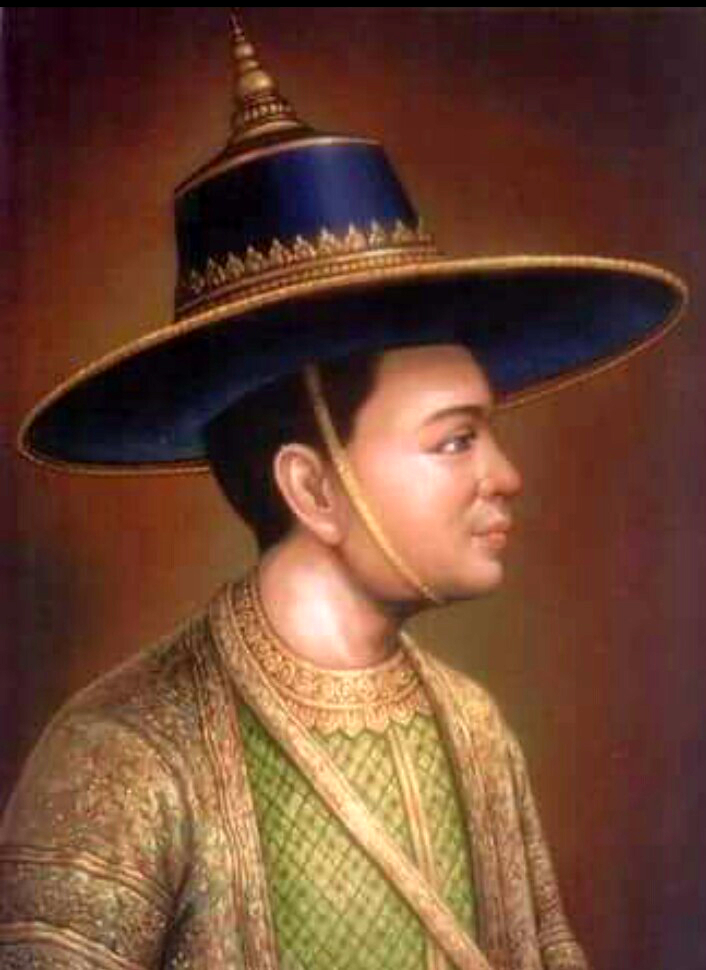
A painting representing Binnya Sein in Siamese noble uniform.

Binnya Sein (Mon: ဗညာစိင်), also known as Chao Phraya Mahayotha Narathibodi Si Phichai Narong (Thai: เจ้าพระยามหาโยธานราธิบดีศรีพิชัยณรงค์) and Cheng Gajaseni (เจ่ง คชเสนี, RTGS: Cheng Khachaseni) was a Mon lord who served under Hsinbyushin, Taksin, and Rama I. He was born in Mawlamyine in 1739 CE. After a failed rebellion against the Konbaung Dynasty in 1774, he immigrated to Thailand during the reign of King Taksin. He was the ancestor of the Kotchaseni family. He was the son of the ruler of Myawaddy, who was the younger brother of Phaya Thala, the last king of the Restored Hanthawaddy Kingdom.

== Under Burmese service ==
Binnya Sein used to serve as the governor of Chiang Rai and had a wife who was named Princess Somna. Later, she had children who bear the surname Na Lampang (ณ ลำปาง).

Binnya Sein had commanded a regiment of 3,000 Mon troops to participate in the Burmese invasion of Ayutthaya in 1765, where he joined forces with Mingyi Kamani Sanda and Maha Nawrahta at Bangsai and would participate in the Battle of Wat Sangkhawat.

Binnya Sein had commanded the Mon army to help the Burmese army attack the city of Luang Prabang in 1772, which he was later raised to be a governor of a small city.

== Under Siamese service ==
In 1774, King Hsinbyushin of Burma ordered Mingyi Kamani Sanda the governor of Martaban to organize armies to invade Siam from the west through the Three Pagodas Pass. Mingyi Kamani Sanda commanded the Mon regiment under Binnya Sein to lead the vanguard into Siam first. However, as the Mon leaders had left Martaban, Mingyi Kamani Sanda forcibly extorted[7] money from the Mon families of Martaban to raise money for the campaigns. Binnya Sein and other Mon leaders, upon learning of Burmese mistreatments of their families back in Martaban, rebelled against the Burmese and returned to take Martaban. Binnya Sein marched his Mon armies to take Yangon but was repelled by the Burmese. The Mon insurrection was defeated and Binnya Sein took refuge in Siam. This incident led to mass migration of Mon people from Martaban into Siam through the Mae Lamao and Three Pagodas Passes.

With Binnya Sein as the leader, he gathered forces to attack Martaban and other Mon cities, but was unsuccessful, so he immigrated to Thailand in 1775 with 3 other chiefs, known in Thai as Phraya U, Tala Kliang, and Tala Klep. King Taksin allowed the Mon refugees to build settlements in the area of Nonthaburi from Pak Kret to Sam Khok. Binnya Sein and his Mon soldiers played a part in every Thai campaign.

During the reign of King Rama I, Binnya Sein was appointed Phraya Mahayotha, commanding all Mon armies and accompanying him in every war. Later, in 1787, he was graciously promoted to Chao Phraya Mahayotha Narathibodi Si Phichai Narong, due to his great deeds when King Rama I went to conquer Thawai. Binnya Sein played a major role in the government of the country in the war between Thailand and Burma. The Burmese requested that Binnya Sein be returned to Burma as he was considered a Burmese citizen. The Thais refused the request.

== Other details ==
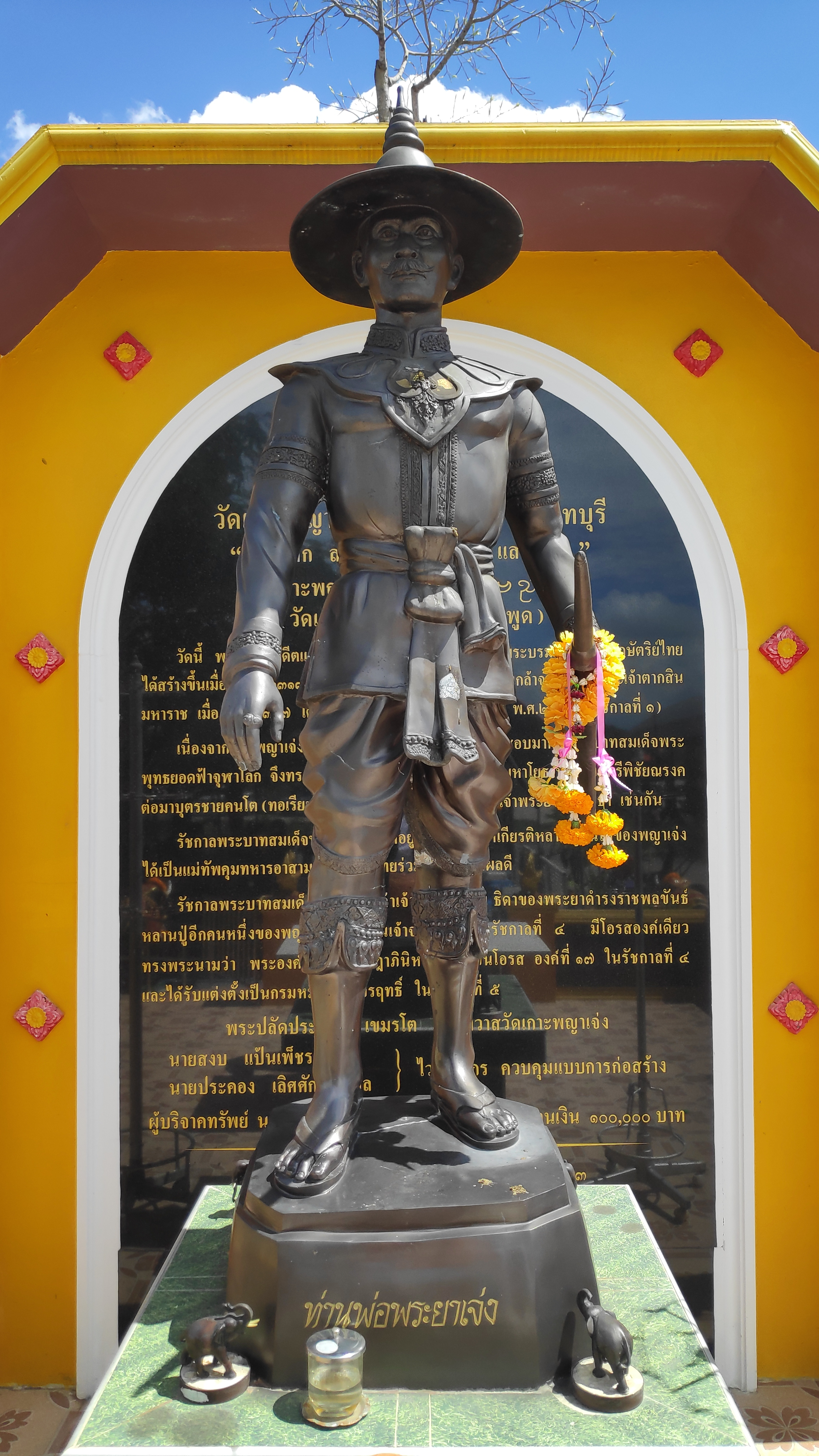
Statue of Binnya Sein at Wat Ko Phaya Cheng, Bang Phut Subdistrict, Pak Kret District, Nonthaburi Province.

In addition to his government service, Binnya Sein was also devoted to Buddhism. He built Wat Cheng Tha in Khlong Bang Talat Subdistrict and Wat Ko Phaya Cheng in Bang Phut Subdistrict, Pak Kret District, Nonthaburi Province.

== Personal life ==
Binnya Seinhad 5 children as follows:

เจ้าพระยามหาโยธา (ทอเรียะ หรือ ทองชื่น) เกิดที่เมืองมอญ ได้ตำแหน่งแทนบิดา ถือเป็นต้นสายสำคัญในสกุลคชเสน

- Chao Phraya Mahayotha Thoria (เจ้าพระยามหาโยธา) or Thongchuen (ทองชื่น) was born in Mawlamyine. He is the head of the Kochaseni bloodline
- Phraya Chomphu (พระยาชมภู) or Chao Phomphu (เจ้าชมภู) was born in Chiang Saen. His mother was named Princess Somna (เจ้าหญิงสมนา), so he was a prince according to Lanna tradition. He had descendants in the northern region, where Chao Chomphu was the great-grandfather of Chao Ratchabut Kaew (ของเจ้าราชบุตรแก้ว) of Muang Phuan.
- Phraya Nakhon Khuen Khan, Raman Ratchachat, Senabodi Si Sitthisongkhram (พระยานครเขื่อนขันธ์รามัญราชชาติเสนาบดีศรีสิทธิสงคราม), also known as Thoma (ทอมา) or Thongma (มา) (Thoma or Thongma) was the chief of Nakhon Khiankhan (นครเขื่อนขันธ์) in Phra Pradaeng, ruler of Nakhon Khuen Khan (formerly Phra Pradaeng Province)
- Phraya Ram (พระยาราม), nicknamed Wan (วัน) was born in the Thonburi period.
- His daughter was named Thapthim (ทับทิม)

The children of Binnya Sein Nakhon Khuen Khan for 9 consecutive years.

== Death ==
Binnya Sein died in 1822 during the reign of Rama II at the age of 83. His son, Chao Phraya Mahayot (Thoria), took over the position of ruler of the Mon people in Nakhon Khuen Khan after his death.
