= Arnaud-Antoine Garnault =

French Catholic bishop (1745-1810)

The Right Reverend Arnaud-Antoine Garnault M.E.P.
- Vicar Apostolic of Siam
- Installed: 10 March 1786
- Term ended: 4 March 1810
- Predecessor: Joseph-Louis Coudé
- Successor: Esprit-Marie-Joseph Florens

Orders
- Consecration: 15 April 1787 by Nicolas Champenois

Personal details
- Born: 1745 Toulouse
- Died: 4 March 1810 (aged 64–65) Chanthaburi
- Denomination: Roman Catholic

Arnaud-Antoine Garnault M.E.P. (1745 – 4 March 1810) was a French Roman Catholic missionary and bishop who served as Vicar Apostolic of Siam from 1786 to 1810.

== Biography ==
Arnaud-Antoine Garnault was born in 1745 in Toulouse. In 1769, he joined the Paris Foreign Missions Society, where he was ordained as a priest, and was sent to carry out mission work in Siam. After the fall of Ayutthaya in 1767, political upheaval placed the Mission and its converts in the kingdom in peril. In 1775, Garnault was imprisoned with Bishop Le Bon, Vicar Apostolic of Siam and father Coudé after several Christian officers refused to consume holy water prepared by Buddhist monks on the occasion of the taking of the oath of loyalty to the king.

In 1779, Garnault and many converts were expelled from Siam. He travelled to the Malay Peninsula with converts and they settled in Kuala Kedah. With the protection of the Sultan of Kedah, he built a church there, and many Siamese and Portuguese Christians fleeing from Phuket and Ligor arrived and settled in the town.

In 1786, when Penang came under British rule led by Francis Light of the East India Company, Garnault was invited to come to Penang, and he arrived from Kuala Kedah by boat with the first Christians on 7 April 1786. There, he built the first Christian church in Penang, the Church of the Assumption, and set up a small printing press. The following year, after his appointment as Vicar Apostolic of Siam and Titular Bishop of Metellopolis, he travelled to Pondicherry where he was consecrated as bishop. On his return to Penang, he was surprised to see a large house had been built for him by Light, in his absence, next to the church as a gift on his elevation to bishop.

While continuing to face opposition from the government in Siam, and due to the ongoing conflict in the kingdom between the Siamese and the Burmese, he faced difficulties in administering his vast diocese. He was reluctant to travel to Siam or to send missionaries to establish posts there, while his mission also suffered from a lack of funds and priests due to the French Revolution. However, in 1794, he went to Bangkok where he supervised the first printing of the Catechism. In 1810, he appointed Esprit-Marie-Joseph Florens as co-adjutor. He died on 4 March 1810 in Chanthaburi.
