= Taksin's reunification of Siam =

1767-71 conquest of the other four Thai states by the Thonburi Kingdom

- Part of Burmese-Siamese wars
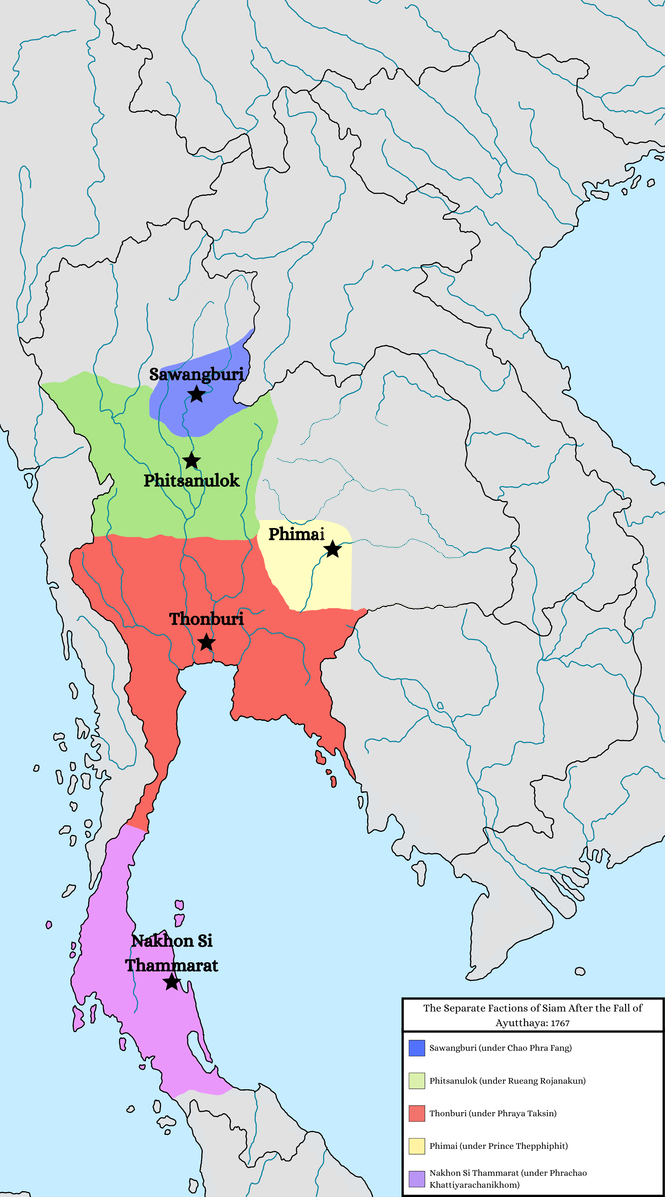
- Map of the five Siamese states (including their capital cities) that emerged following the dissolution of the Ayutthaya Kingdom in 1767
Date	1767–1770/71 (Note: Baker-Phongpaichit and Terwiel argues 1771 to be the year in which Taksin reunified Siam, while Wyatt argues for 1770.)
Location	Siam
Result	Thonburi victory
Territorial changes	Reunification of Siam under the Thonburi Kingdom.

Belligerents
Thonburi Kingdom	Phimai Kingdom; Phitsanulok Kingdom; Sawangkhaburi Kingdom; Nakhon Si Thammarat Kingdom; Principality of Banteay Mas; Konbaung Dynasty

Commanders and leaders
Taksin; Chaophraya Chakri; Chaophraya Surasri; Phraya Phichai; Phraya Chaban; Phraya Kawila; Phraya Vaiwongsa	Thepphiphit (executed); Chaophraya Phitsanulok †; Chao Fang (MIA); Chaophraya Nakhon (POW); Mạc Thiên Tứ; Maengki Manya (WIA); Thugyi †; Thong-in †

Strength
Unknown	Unknown

Casualties and losses
Unknown	Unknown

Following the Sack of Ayutthaya and the collapse of the Ayutthaya Kingdom (1351–1767) during the Burmese–Siamese War (1765–1767), a power vacuum left Siam divided into 5 autonomous cliques (self-proclaimed kingdoms)—Phimai, Phitsanulok, Sawangkhaburi, Nakhon Si Thammarat, and Thonburi. The Burmese invasion force, having returned to Burma off their successful sack of Ayutthaya and to defend its homeland against an imposing Chinese invasion of Ava, were too preoccupied to take advantage of the power vacuum in Siam.

The Thonburi kingdom, led by Taksin, prevailed, subjugating its rivals to successfully reunify Siam under the Thonburi Kingdom (1767–1782) by 1770/71.

To defend his flanks against a future Burmese invasion, Taksin later invaded Lan Na while Hsinbyushin sent small invasion forces to counter Taksin's military operations. Taksin, however, succeeded in driving back the small Burmese invasions and captured Lan Na in 1775, leading to the dying Hsinbyushin to send one last major military expedition to destroy Thonburi in 1775-76.

This second wave of Burmese-Siamese warfare would not end until the early 19th century, depopulating much of Siam while Taksin secured a militaristic Siamese successor state to the Ayutthaya Kingdom at the new Siamese capital of Thonburi (later known as Bangkok).

== Background ==
=== Origin of Taksin ===
Taksin was born in 1734 with the birth name Sin (Thai: สิน) or Zheng Xin (鄭新). His father, Zheng Yong (鄭鏞), was a Teochew Chinese merchant and tax collector who had earlier immigrated from Huafu (華富) village in Chenghai, Guangdong, to serve in Siam. His mother, Nok-iang (Thai: นกเอี้ยง), was of Siamese-Mon descent. The story of the early formative years of Taksin is mostly drawn from Miraculous Deeds of Ancestors (Thai: อภินิหารบรรพบุรุษ), a work that was officially published in 1930 and may be attributed to the Thai historian K.S.R. Kulap. According to this narrative, Taksin was adopted by a Siamese high-ranking minister and rose through the ranks of Ayutthayan bureaucracy. However, this work was possibly written more than a century after the described events and its historical verifiability is questionable, leading some modern scholars to consider this narrative ahistorical. Most of the sources composed in early Rattanakosin period described Taksin as being originally a simple Chinese caravan merchant who used his wealth to buy the position of governor of Tak from the Ayutthayan court. Nevertheless, Taksin was appointed governor of Tak in 1764, receiving the title of Phraya Tak. By 1765, Taksin was ordered by the Ayutthayan court to help defend the city against the Burmese invasion. Very little was known about Taksin before 1765 as few historical evidences survived.

=== Burmese Invasions of Ayutthaya ===
The Mon King Binnya Dala of Hanthawaddy Kingdom seized the Burmese royal city of Ava in 1752, toppling the centuries-old Burmese Toungoo dynasty. The power vacuum left Aung Zeiya, a local Burmese man of Moksobo village (modern Shwebo), to quickly rise powerful in his resistance against the Mon rule. Aung Zeiya declared himself King Alaungpaya of the newfound Konbaung dynasty in 1752. Alaungpaya consolidated his powers in Upper Burma and invaded Lower Burma, which had been under the rule of the Mon Hanthawaddy Kingdom. In 1757, Alaungpaya destroyed the Mon royal capital of Pegu and dissolved the Mon kingdom, unifying both upper and lower Burma under his rule.

After the death of Prince Thammathibet in 1756 in a political incident, King Borommakot of Ayutthaya decided to skip his second son Ekkathat in favor of his third son Uthumphon born to his principal queens to be appointed as the new heir, citing the incompetency of Ekkathat as the reason of his decision. Borommakot died in April 1758. Three other sons of Borommakot, known as Chao Sam Krom (Thai: เจ้าสามกรม, "the Three Princes"), who were born to Borommakot's secondary consorts, competed for the throne against Uthumphon in May 1758. Even though Uthumphon prevailed and the Three Princes were eventually killed, he sat for barely a month on the throne as he felt the pressure to relinquish the throne to his elder brother Ekkathat. Uthumphon abdicated in June 1758 and became a Buddhist monk, earning him the epithet Khun Luang Hawat (Thai: ขุนหลวงหาวัด, "the king who seeks the temple"). Ekkathat eventually ascended the throne as the last king of Ayutthaya. Prince Kromma Muen Thepphiphit (Thai: กรมหมื่นเทพพิพิธ), another son of Borommakot and a political ally of Uthumphon, came up with a conspiracy to overthrow Ekkathat and reinue Uthumphon. However, the seditious plot was leaked and Thepphiphit was exiled to Sri Lanka in 1758.

In January 1760, Burmese King Alaungpaya sent his vanguard army to conquer the Siamese-held cities of Mergui and Tenasserim. He then quickly led his armies to attack Ayutthaya in April 1760. The Ayutthaya Royal City had not been threatened so directly by external invaders since 1587. However, the annual flooding of Ayutthaya, along with Alaungpaya's illness, forced the Burmese to retreat. He died on his way back to Burma on that occasion. After involving in a political conflict in Sri Lanka, Thepphiphit was repatriated to Siam in 1762, arriving at the port city of Tenasserim. Ekkathat was surprised by the return of his half-brother and had him confined in Chanthaburi, on the eastern coast.

Burma conquered Lanna in 1763 and the Lao kingdoms of Luang Phrabang and Vientiane in 1765, securing all of the Siamese northern frontiers. In 1765, the new Burmese king, Hsinbyushin, launched a pincer-movement campaign against Siam by ordering his forces to invade from both the north and the west, with the goal of converging on Ayutthaya. The Siamese peripheral towns offered little to no resistance, as the royal court adopted a defensive strategy by concentrating its forces in Ayutthaya itself. By January 1766, the Burmese had once again reached the outskirts of Ayutthaya and laid siege to the city. In March 1766, Chaophraya Phrakhlang led Siamese forces in an attack against the Burmese general Nemyo Thihapate in the northern suburbs. However, Phrakhlang was defeated and forced to retreat. It was only due to the rear protection provided by Taksin that he was able to withdraw safely. Meanwhile, Thepphiphit, still confined in Chanthaburi, volunteered to lead a resistance against the Burmese and gathered his forces at Prachinburi. However, he was defeated—either by the Burmese or by forces sent by King Ekkathat, who distrusted his half-brother. The prince fled to Nakhon Ratchasima. In November 1766, Taksin and Phraya Phetchaburi Rueang led the Siamese riverine fleet to face the Burmese at Wat Sangkhawat in the southeastern outskirts of Ayutthaya near Wat Yai Chaimongkhon. The Siamese were defeated, and Phraya Phetchaburi Rueang was killed in battle. Taksin was later blamed for the loss of his comrade.

=== Prince Thepphiphit in Phimai ===
After his defeat at Prachinburi, Prince Thepphiphit went through the Chong Ruea Taek Pass to Nakhon Ratchasima (Khorat). He sent gifts to Phraya Nakhon Ratchasima, the governor of the city, seeking an alliance. However, Phraya Nakhon Ratchasima rejected the offer and threatened to arrest the prince. In response, Thepphiphit gathered a force of 450 men and secretly sent his son, Prince Prayong, disguised, into Khorat. On September 17, 1766, Prince Prayong's forces ambushed and assassinated Phraya Nakhon Ratchasima. Thepphiphit then seized control of the city. Luang Phaeng, the younger brother of the slain governor, fled to take refuge in Phimai with Phra Phimai, the governor of the city. Five days later, on September 22, Phra Phimai and Luang Phaeng brought forces to attack Khorat. Luang Phaeng successfully recaptured the city on September 26, avenging his brother's death. Thepphiphit's sons, including Prince Prayong, were executed. Luang Phaeng proposed executing Thepphiphit as well, but Phra Phimai intervened and took the prince with him back to Phimai.

It turned out that Phra Phimai was loyal to Thepphiphit. At Phimai, he declared Thepphiphit a king. From that point, Thepphiphit became known as Chao Phimai (Thai: เจ้าพิมาย). Phra Phimai was appointed Prime Minister with the title Chaophraya Suriyawong. His two sons were granted the noble titles Phraya Mahamontri and Phraya Worawongsa. Phra Phimai then devised a plan to kill Luang Phaeng. He paid a visit to Luang Phaeng in Khorat. Luang Phaeng trusted their friendship, so he did not suspect anything. While they were watching a traditional performance together, Phra Phimai rose up and killed Luang Phaeng with his sword. Phra Phimai then took control of Nakhon Ratchasima and left his son, Phraya Worawongsa, to govern the city. By late 1766, the Phimai kingdom, under the leadership of Prince Thepphiphit, had emerged with authority extending across the Khorat Plateau.

== List of kings during the interregnum of the five kingdoms after the fall (1767–1770) ==
=== Kingdom of Phitsanulok ===
Declared Independence from Ayutthaya
No.	Portrait	Regnal name	Personal name	Birth	Reign from	Reign until	Death	Notes, Life details, and Achievements
1		Chaophraya Surasi Bisanuvadhiraj เจ้าพระยาสุรสีห์พิษณุวาธิราช	Reuang เรือง	1719	1767	1768	1768	A soldier during the reign of Sanphet IX; A governor during the reign of Maha Thammarachathirat II; A governor during the reign of Maha Thammarachathirat III; A governor during the reign of Borommaracha III; Declared himself the King of Phitsanulok in 1767; Sent a letter to Great Qing for the approval as his status as King; Great Qing refused the approval as his status as King; Died due to smallpox a week after his coronation
2		Phra Indara'akon พระอินทรอากร	Chan จันทร์	unknown	1768	1768		Younger Brother of Surasi Bisanuvadhiraj; Executed by Chao Phra Fang
Annexed by Sawangkhaburi

=== Kingdom of Sawangkhaburi ===
Declared Independence from Ayutthaya
No.	Portrait	Regnal name	Personal name	Birth	Reign from	Reign until	Death	Notes, Life details, and Achievements
1		Chao Phra Fang เจ้าพระฝาง	Ruean เรือน	unknown	1767	1770	unknown	A monk; Declared himself a King in Sawangkhaburi, claiming supernatural powers in 1767 after finding a white elephant; He created a monk army; Establish a theorcratic regime; Conquered the Kingdom of Phitsanulok in 1770; Condemned by Sanphet X, then Chao Taksin, as a heretic monk, inciting a purge within the northern clergy; MIA after the fall of the Kingdom of Sawangkhaburi
Annexed by Thonburi

=== Kingdom of Nakhon Si Thammarat ===
Declared Independence from Ayutthaya
No.	Portrait	Regnal name	Personal name	Birth	Reign from	Reign until	Death	Notes, Life details, and Achievements
1		Phra Chao Khattiya Ratchanikhom พระเจ้าขัตติยราชนิคม	Phra Plat Nu พระปลัดหนู	unknown	1767	1769	unknown	An Ayutthayan noble; Became the King of Nakhon Si Thammarat in 1767; Taken as hostage to Thonburi in 1770; Reinstated King of Nakhon Si Thammarat in 1776; Downgraded to a Duchy in 1782
Incorporated as a Vassal Kingdom into Thonburi

=== Kingdom of Phimai ===
Declared Independence from Ayutthaya
No.	Portrait	Regnal name	Personal name	Birth	Reign from	Reign until	Death	Notes, Life details, and Achievements
1		Chao Thepphiphit เจ้าเทพพิพิธ	Phra Ong Chao Khaek พระองค์เจ้าแขก	1717	1767	1768		Son of Maha Thammarachathirat II; A prince of Ayutthaya; Declared as King and next monarch of Ayutthaya by the Earl of Phimai; Incited the Rebellion of Prince Thepphiphit of 1758 in the Kingdom of Ayutthaya; Exiled to Ceylon(Kingdom of Kandy) in 1758; Conspired against king Kirti Sri Rajasinha of Kandy to place the Siamese prince Thepphiphit on the Kandyan throne but failed; Return to fight in the 11th Ayutthaya-Burma(Konbaung) war of 1765-1767 but he failed; Became the King of Phimai in 1767; Executed by Sanphet X
Incorporated as a Duchy into Thonburi

== Taksin's journey to the east ==
=== Departure from Ayutthaya ===
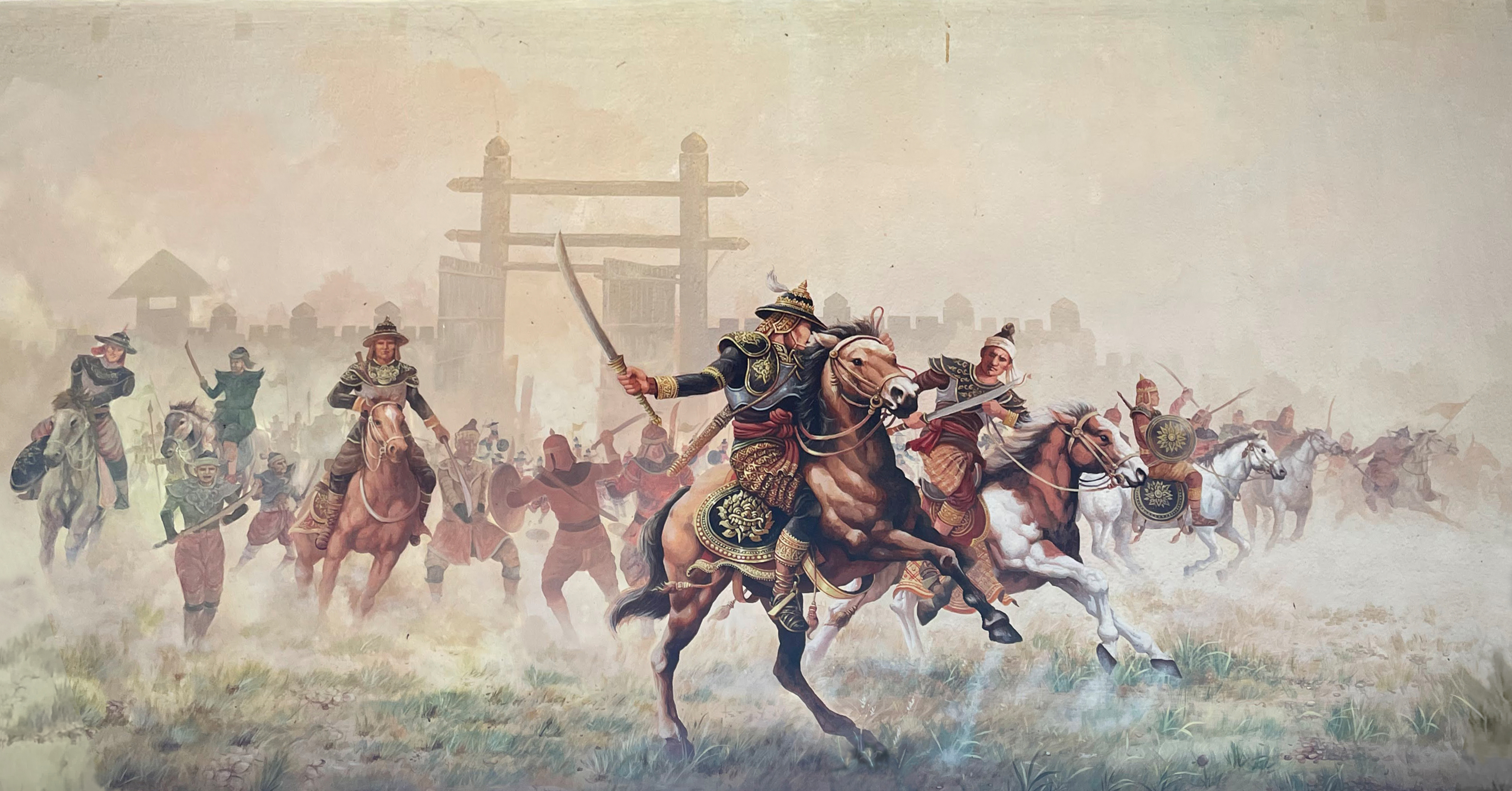
Taksin cavalry battle at Phran Nok. This mural is at The King Taksin the Great Shrine in Mueang Tak, Tak Province. Taksin holds a daab (dha) sword in his right hand and wears a metal breastplate, helmet and pauldrons.

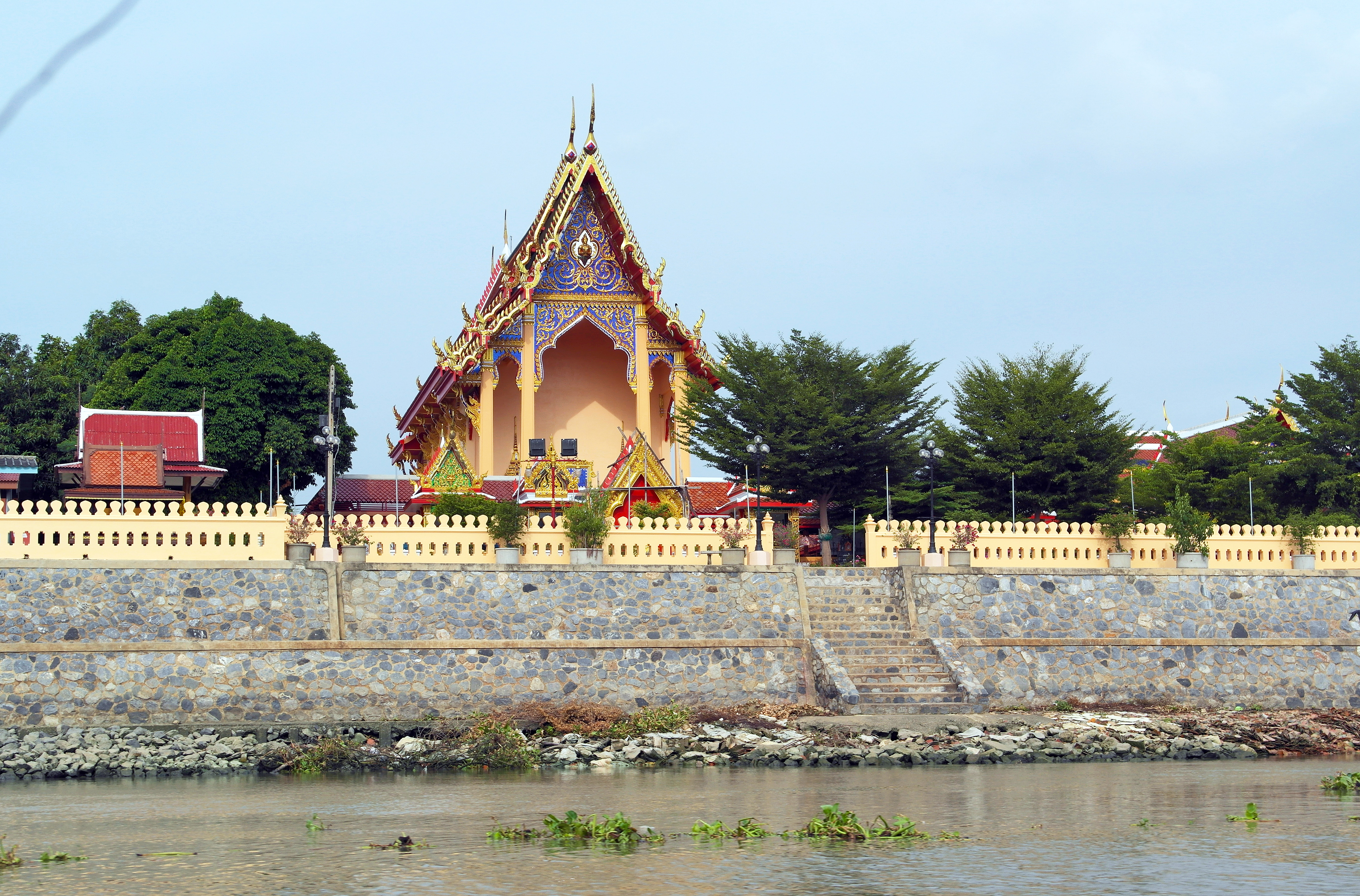
Wat Phichai Songkhram, located just to the east of the old Ayutthaya, was the site where Taksin gathered his followers in January 1767.

By January 1767, the situation for Ayutthaya's defenders had become dire, as food supply depleted and more people surrendered to the Burmese besiegers. An earlier incident highlighted this desperation—when Siamese gunpowder was running low, King Ekkathat ordered that every cannon shot had to be pre-permitted by the royal court. Taksin was tried for firing a cannon without permission. These events disheartened him. Realizing that Ayutthaya could not withstand the Burmese assault, Taksin began planning to break through the Burmese encirclement to seek a new position to the east. In the night of January 3, 1767, Taksin gathered about 500 Siamese-Chinese followers from Ayutthaya at Wat Phichai Songkhram, just outside the city's eastern wall. These original followers included:

- Phra Chiang-ngeon (Thai: พระเชียงเงิน), governor of the Chiang-ngeon near Tak
- Luang Phichairacha (Thai: หลวงพิชัยราชา) or Luang Phichai-asa (Thai: หลวงพิชัยอาสา), son of Phraya Phetchaburi Rueang
- Khun Phiphit Wathi (Thai: ขุนพิพิธวาที, personal name Chen Lian 陳聯), a Teochew Chinese
- Cambodian Prince Ang Non, who had taken refuge in Ayutthaya in 1758 due to political conflict

Apart from these, Thai chronicles also mentioned several other minor names that cannot be identified with any personalities in subsequent periods. Taksin's followers were mostly adventurous mid-ranking officials. That night, before midnight, Taksin led his followers in a successful breakout through the Burmese line to the east. By midnight, a great fire broke out in Ayutthaya, so illuminated that can be seen by Taksin. On January 4, the Burmese followed and caught up with him at Phosaohan, about twenty kilometers east of Ayutthaya. Taksin led his Chinese-Siamese forces in successfully repelling them—the first victory after his departure.

On January 5, a local leader, Khun Chamnan Phraison (Thai: ขุนชำนาญไพรสณฑ์), gave six elephants to Taksin and guided him to Ban Dong (modern Nakhon Nayok). There, Taksin encountered local resistance, as the leaders refused to submit. The inhabitants had formed an autonomous encampment with around 1,000 men. On January 6, Taksin led his smaller force in an attack on Ban Dong, defeating the defenders, who surrendered afterward.

Taksin continued his journey through Nakhon Nayok, reaching Prachinburi on January 10. Phra Chiang-ngeon, moving too slowly, was left behind. Taksin punished him with caning for disobedience. A large Burmese army advanced from Paknam Cholo on the Bangpakong River toward Prachinburi. Taksin prepared to defend by positioning his cannons. On January 10, the Burmese reached Taksin at Prachinburi, leading to the Battle of Prachinburi. Taksin ordered all cannons to fire at once—three full rounds—before the Burmese were finally dispersed.

Following this victory, Taksin moved downstream along the Bang Pakong River to the Gulf of Siam. He reach Bang Plasoi (Chonburi) on January 19, defeated local resistance at Pattaya, and continued along the eastern coastline through Jomtien and Sattahip. He arrived in Rayong on January 25.

=== Taksin in Rayong ===
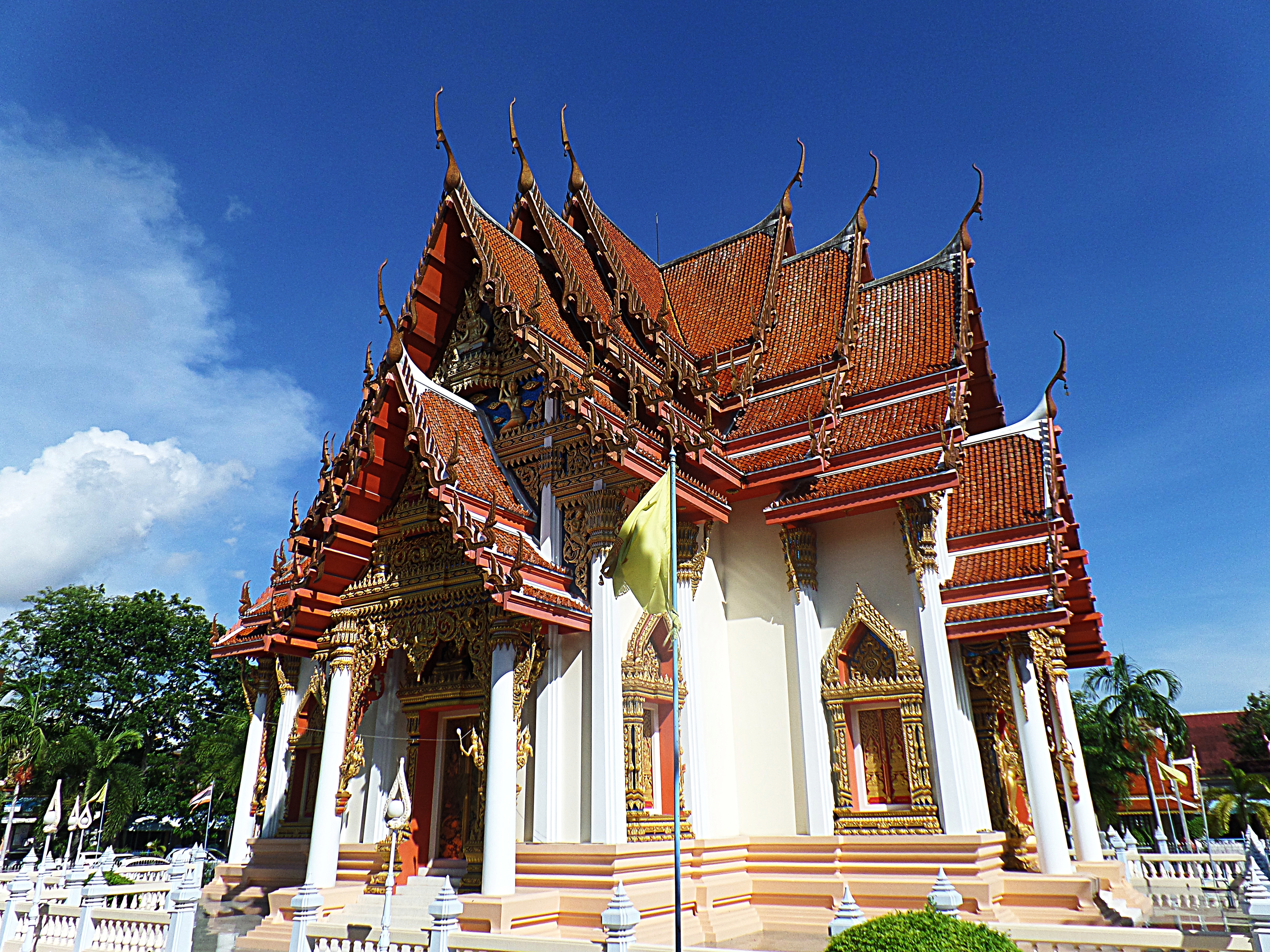
Wat Lum Mahachai Chumphon in modern Tambon Tha Pradu, Mueang Rayong district, was the temple where Taksin made his military camp and had sheltered for five months from January to June 1767.

In late January 1767, Taksin and his retinue reached the outskirts of Rayong, where the governor of Rayong came to meet with him in search of an alliance. On January 21, Taksin settled at Wat Lum Mahachai Chumphon in the city, where he appointed his subordinate Phra Chiang-ngeon as Phra Thainam, commander of the royal mercenary forces. He also promoted his followers, elevating their ranks from Khun to Luang. Taksin had begun appointing his own royal officials even before becoming king.

However, on January 23, two men in Rayong warned Taksin that the alliance was a trap. The Rayong officials Khun Ram and Muen Song were secretly gathering 1,500 troops outside the city to launch an attack that very night. Realizing the deception, Taksin arrested the governor of Rayong and prepared for battle.

- Luang Chamnan Phraison and Phra Chiang-ngoen commanded the Siamese regiments
- Luang Phiphit Chen Lien and Luang Phichairacha commanded the Chinese regiments

That night, Khun Ram and Muen Song led their forces into Rayong, attempting to cross a bridge into the city. Taksin's forces launched a counterattack at the bridge, massacring the attackers, many of whom were driven into the water. Khun Ram and Muen Song fled and regrouped at Klaeng, east of Rayong.

In February 1767, after his victory in Rayong, Taksin announced his plan to subjugate Chanthaburi to bring the entire eastern Siamese coastline under his control. He first pursued diplomacy, sending a delegate to demand submission from Phraya Chanthaburi. At the time, Chao Khrua Lan (Thai: เจ้าขรัวหลาน) served as governor of Chanthaburi. His name was recorded in Chinese sources as Pu Lan (普蘭). Phraya Chanthaburi pretended to comply and promised to visit Taksin in Rayong. After waiting ten days without response, Taksin realized that Chanthaburi would resist. Meanwhile, Khun Ram and Muen Song continued their attacks from Klaeng in late March 1767. Taksin launched a counteroffensive and defeated them again. This time, they fled to Chanthaburi and sought protection under Phraya Chanthaburi.

Taksin also sought military aid from Banteay Mas, which had been ruled by the Cantonese Mạc Thiên Tứ. He sent Phraya Phichairacha to deliver a "royal letter" to Mạc Thiên Tứ, reaching Banteay Mas on March 28, 1767—marking their first official contact. In the letter, Taksin flatteringly referred to himself as Mạc Thiên Tứ's adopted son. Phraya Phichairacha returned to Rayong a month later on April 27.

In April 1767, a local man in Chonburi named Thongyoo Noklek (Thai: นายทองอยู่นกเล็ก) declared himself a pirate leader and began plundering merchant ships. Taksin sailed his fleet from Rayong to defeat him. Thongyoo Noklek eventually surrendered and pledged allegiance to Taksin, who then appointed him as Phraya Anuratburi, governor of Chonburi, and ordered him to cease his piracy. By the time Ayutthaya fell in April 1767, Taksin had established dominion over the entire eastern coast from Chonburi to Rayong.

=== Fall of Ayutthaya ===
After enduring a fourteen-month siege, the city of Ayutthaya fell to Burmese forces on April 7, 1767. The Burmese looted and burned the city, effectively destroying it and bringing an end to Ayutthaya’s 417-year status as the capital of the Siamese kingdom. King Ekkathat, the last ruler of Ayutthaya, died shortly after the fall—either from starvation or from a random gunshot during the chaos. He was later buried at the royal cremation grounds. Roughly 30,000 residents of Ayutthaya, including the former king Uthumphon, members of the royal family, and noble elites, were taken to Burma as captives. After their victory, the Burmese were obliged to withdraw most of its forces from Ayutthaya to the upcoming Sino-Burmese War and did not have time to enforce their occupation on Siam. The Burmese forces left Ayutthaya in June 1767, leaving two garrisons at Phosamton (Thai: โพธิ์สามต้น), north of Ayutthaya, under the Mon commander Thugyi or Suki (Thai: สุกี้พระนายกอง)), and another at Thonburi, led by a Siamese man named Thong-in. Some members of Ayutthayan royal dynasty and nobility, who were unsuitable for long journey, were also left at Phosamton.

=== Rise of regional rulers ===
The fall of Ayutthaya and the subsequent Burmese withdrawal created a massive power vacuum across Siam. Without a central authority, the kingdom descended into a state of anarchy. The countryside was in turmoil as little authority existed. Numerous warlords and local leaders declared themselves sovereigns. Notable warlord kingdoms and self-proclaimed rulers that emerged after Ayutthaya’s fall included:

- Prince Thepphiphit, who had established the Phimai kingdom at Phimai in late 1766 in the northeast. Among the various claimants to power, Prince Thepphiphit was the only one who asserted legitimacy through lineage to the fallen Ayutthayan Ban Phlu Luang dynasty. Appointing ministers as if he were the legitimate monarch
- Chaophraya Phitsanulok (Rueang), the governor of Phitsanulok, declared himself King of Northern Siam. Phitsanulok, being a key administrative center, became his power base.
- Chao Phra Fang, a local Buddhist monk, established a theocratic regime at Sawangkhaburi near the northern frontiers, declared himself King in Sawangkhaburi. His government included fellow monks who governed alongside him, all dressed in red robes.
- In the south, Phra Palat Nu, the acting governor of Nakhon Si Thammarat (Ligor), declared himself Chao Nakhon, King of Southern Siam. His predecessor, Phraya Ratchasuphawadi, had been imprisoned during Ayutthaya’s final days, leaving Phra Palat Nu to take control after the city’s fall.
- Taksin, who had established his base in Rayong, also declared himself a sovereign ruler.

=== Conquest of Chanthaburi ===
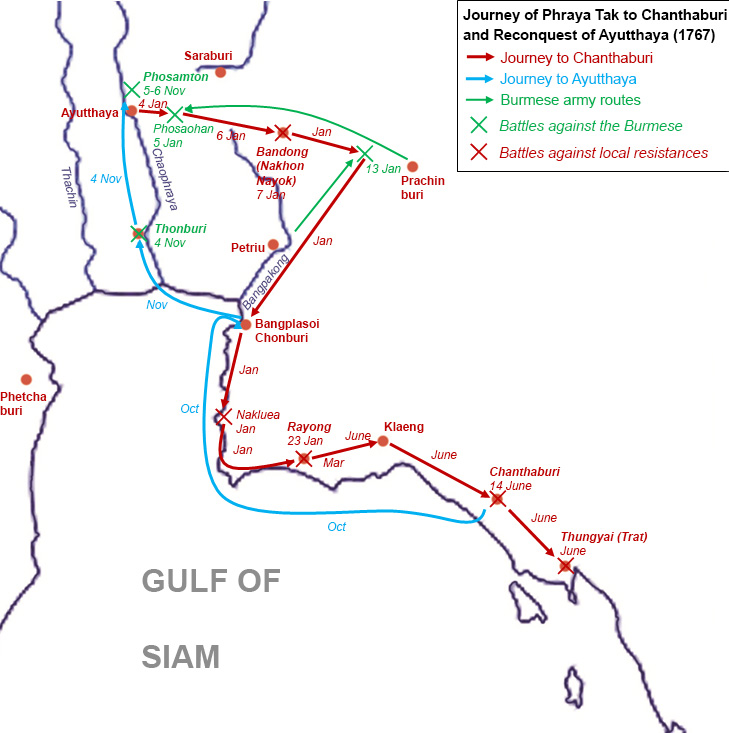
Journey of Taksin from Ayutthaya to Chanthaburi and his return to reconquer Ayutthaya in 1767, according to traditional Thai historiography.

In the late Ayutthaya period, Teochew Chinese immigrants had settled in the eastern coastal port cities of Siam, especially in Chonburi and Chanthaburi. Chanthaburi had become a major Chinese entrepôt. Phraya Chanthaburi had been cooperating with Khun Ram and Muen Song, both enemies of Taksin. In April 1767, Phraya Chanthaburi sent four Buddhist monks to Rayong to invite Taksin to Chanthaburi. Though Taksin knew it was a trap, he decided to go—but not alone. He took two months to prepare his army for the conquest of Chanthaburi. This campaign was a turning point in his career, marking his rise from a local to a regional leader. Taksin and his retinue left Rayong in June 1767, travelling overland to Chanthaburi. Phraya Chanthaburi sent his delegates to intercept him, attempting to lure him into crossing the Chanthaburi River, where an ambush was waiting. Taksin ordered his troops to avoid that path and instead took position at Tha Chang, on the northern outskirts of Chanthaburi.

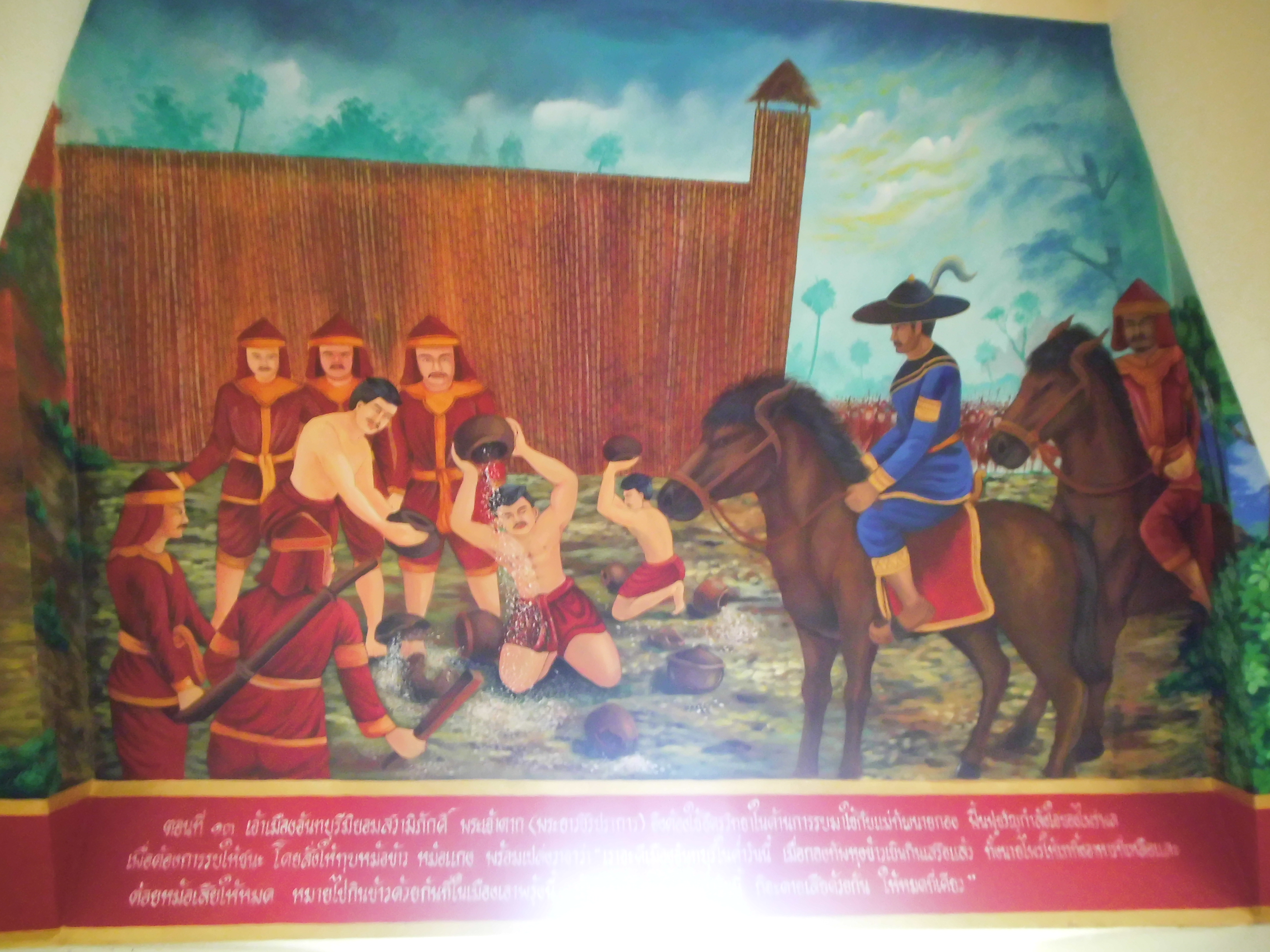
King Taksin ordered his forces to consume all remaining food and destroy their cooking pots before attacking the city of Chanthaburi (murals in Wat Tham Suea, Kanchanaburi Province).

Taksin stayed at Wat Kaew where he encamped and established military defenses. Meanwhile, Phraya Chanthaburi stationed defenses along the city walls. Chanthaburi sent a delegate to invite Taksin into the city, but he refused and insisted that Phraya Chanthaburi come to Wat Kaew. He also demanded that Khun Ram and Muen Song be surrendered. On the evening of June 15, 1767, Taksin ordered his forces to consume all remaining food and destroy their cooking pots, pressing that the victory must be accomplished before the next meal. This was done to create a strong urge to successfully take Chanthaburi as, if they failed to do, they would die either in fighting or from starvation. According to a popular version of oral history, he said, "We are going to attack Chanthaburi tonight. Destroy all the food and utensils we have, for we will have our food in Chanthaburi tomorrow morning."

That night, Taksin launched an assault on Chanthaburi. The city responded with heavy gunfire. A bullet narrowly missed Taksin as he rode an elephant. The elephant mahout commanded the elephant to retreat for safety but Taksin threatened to execute the mahout for disobedience and instead used his knife to puncture his elephant, causing it a great pain as it ran amok to destroy the city gate. Chanthaburi fell to Taksin that same night. Phraya Chanthaburi and his family fled and sought refuge in Banteay Mas.

=== Conquest of Trat ===
After capturing Chanthaburi, Taksin and his forces continued overland to Trat, the easternmost Siamese port city on the eastern coast. There, he encountered a group of Teochew Chinese merchant-pirates anchored at the port who refused to submit to his authority. Taksin ordered his troops to launch an attack on the pirates. The fighting occurred for half a day until Taksin eventually prevailed. Many of the Chinese pirates were killed in the battle. Chiam (Thai: จีนเจียม) the leader of the pirates submitted to Taksin. De Fels proposed that Chiam was the same person as Chen Tai (陳太, called Trần Thái in Vietnamese), the Teochew Chinese pirate who had earlier attacked Hà Tiên but was defeated by the forces of Mạc Thiên Tứ. With the conquest of Trat, Taksin put the whole eastern Siamese coastline stretching from Chonburi to Trat under his control.

== Reconquest of Ayutthaya ==
Taksin spent three months assembling his navy at a shipyard dock in Ban Samet Ngam, Chanthaburi. In October 1767, at the end of the monsoon season, He and his retinue, numbering to 5,000 men, which was ten times larger than his original forces of 500 men when he left Ayutthaya earlier the same year, left Chanthaburi for Chao Phraya River. When he reached Chonburi, Taksin discovered that Thongyoo Noklek, whom he had appointed the governor of Chonburi, was still engaging in pirate activities. He then had Thongyoo Noklek arrested and executed by drowning.

=== Battle of Phosamton ===
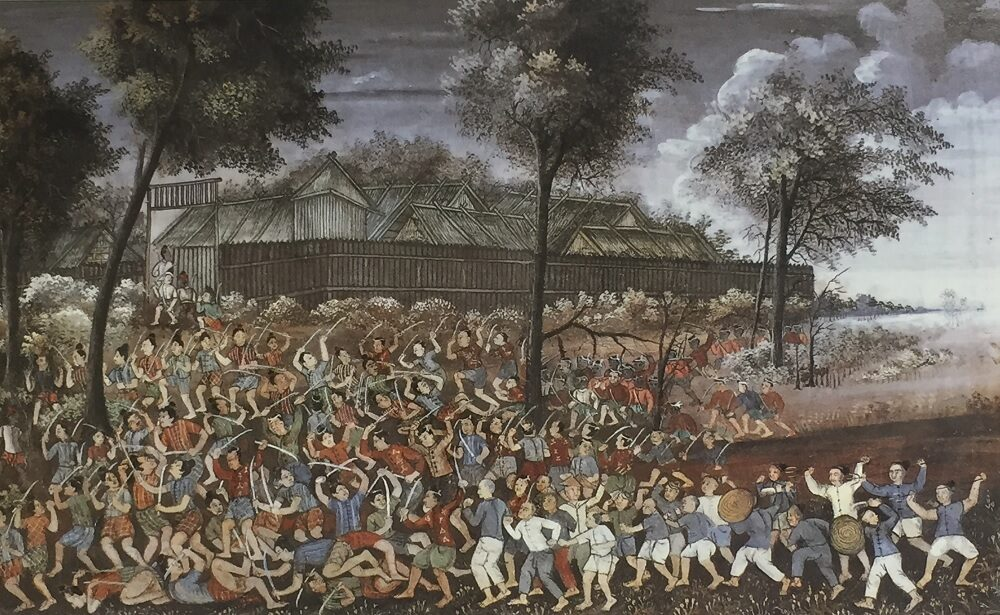
Battle of Phosamton in November 1767.

Taksin reached the Paknam Samut Prakarn and proceeded to Thonburi, then a small port city just 20 kilometers from the Gulf of Thailand and directly across the Chao Phraya River from present-day Bangkok, On November 4, he faced Thong-in, the Siamese commander of the Burmese garrison at Thonburi. The ensuing Battle of Thonburi ended in Taksin's victory and the death of Thong-in. He then advanced north to attack the remaining Burmese garrison at Phosamton.

Suki (also known as Thugyi), a Mon commander of the Burmese forces at Phosamton, took defensive positions as Taksin approached. Taksin and his riparian navy sailed upstream the Chao Phraya and eventually reached Phosamton the next day on November 5, leading to the Battle of Phosamton. Suki encamped his defense on both sides of a canal. Taksin's armies managed to capture the east side of the Phosamton encampment, with Suki himself persisting on the west side. Taksin ordered the assault on the western Phosamton, with Khun Phiphit Wathi and Luang Phichairacha commanding the Chinese regiment as vanguard. In the morning of November 6, the Chinese regiment attacked Suki. Suki persisted until noon when he was defeated and killed in battle. Few hundred Burmese guarding the garrison were massacred. The Burmese garrison of Phosamton fell to Taksin on November 6, 1767, within seven months after the Fall of Ayutthaya. Taksin managed to seize the Burmese Phosamton camp within two days and his victory at Phosamton was symbolic of liberation of Siam from Burmese occupation.

With the capture of two Burmese garrisons at Thonburi and Phosamton in November 1767, Taksin effectively ended the Burmese occupation of Lower Central Siam and assumed control over the region. Taksin stayed at the house of the deceased Suki, where he received submission from Phraya Thibetbodi the most senior of the remaining Ayutthaya nobles in Phosamton. Taksin found the surviving members of the former royal dynasty and the nobility at Phosamton to be in a deplorable state. Two princesses had already died from illness and poor living conditions. Taksin then ordered the body of the former king Ekkathat to be exhumed and given an abbreviated proper royal cremation ceremonies. He rode an elephant to take a look on the city of Ayutthaya. He found the former Siamese royal city to be in ruins, with human corpses and bones scattering around. Taksin initially intended to restore Ayutthaya as the capital city of Siam. However, according to Thai chronicles, that night, he slept at the Ayutthayan royal palace. He dreamt that the former kings of Ayutthaya dismissed him and urged him to leave Ayutthaya. Taksin then decided that Ayutthaya was too ruinous to be restored in a short period of time as he needed a defendable fortress against possible Burmese repercussions. Realizing that Ayutthaya would be difficult to defend against the Burmese, Taksin made the Thonburi port-city near the Chao Phraya delta his base and capital with close proximity to the sea.

=== Enthronement of King Taksin ===
Taksin initially intended to reestablish Ayutthaya as his capital. For strategic reasons, however, Taksin decided not to make his base at Ayutthaya. One of the reason for his decision was the vast destruction inflicted on the former royal city of Ayutthaya itself. Taksin founded Thonburi as his new capital, only twenty kilometers from the Gulf of Siam, to be a suitable port for commerce. There had been a fort (modern Wichaiprasit fort) built by the French at Thonburi in the seventeenth century. Taksin constructed the Thonburi Palace to be his residence just at the fort. Taksin performed the coronation ceremony on December 28, 1767 at the Thonburi Palace. His regnal name was Boromaraja IV but he was known posthumously and popularly as King Taksin—combining his former title Phraya Tak and the birth name Sin. However, the new capital of Thonburi was left bare until 1771 when the king ordered the city moat to be dug and the city wall was erected from the coral tree timber.

=== Battle of Bangkung ===
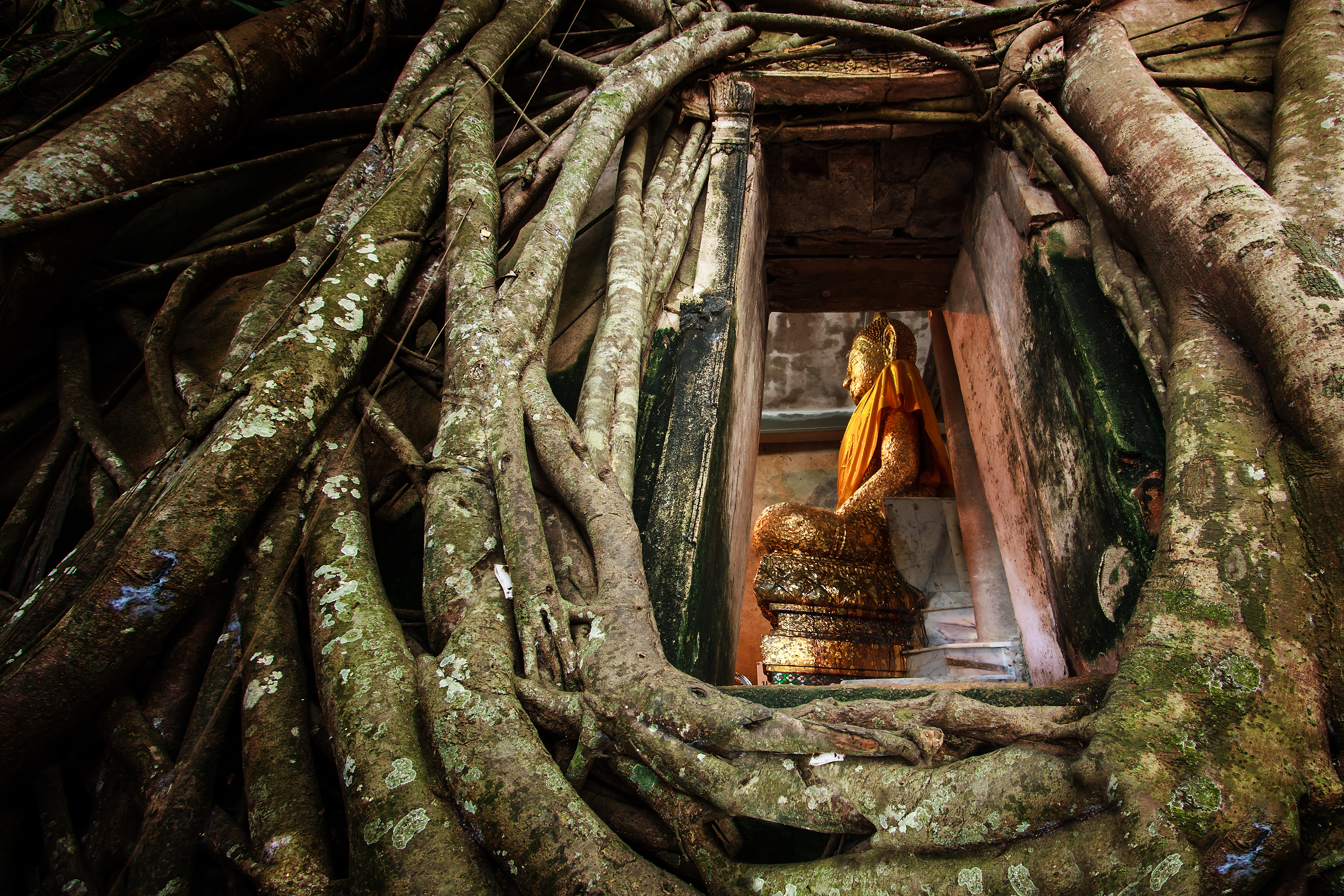
Wat Bang Kung or the Bangkung temple in modern Tambon Bang Kung, Bang Khonthi district, Samut Songkhram province, was the site of the Battle of Bangkung in 1768. The Ubosoth is covered in thick banyan tree vines.

As the Burmese had largely evacuated Siam and had been preoccupied with the Sino-Burmese War, according to Thai chronicles, King Hsinbyushin of Burma ordered the Burmese governor of Tavoy with the name of Maengki Manya (Thai: แมงกี้มารหญ้า) to lead a scouting force through the Three Pagodas Pass into Siam to investigate the situation in 1768. Maengki Manya led the forces of 2,000 Tavoyan men into Siam, marching through Kanchanaburi and reached Bang Kung (Thai: บางกุ้ง) on the Mae Klong River in Samut Songkhram, which had been a Chinese community town, to the west of Thonburi. King Taksin was incognizant about this Burmese advance and was informed only when the Burmese had already attacked the Chinese inhabitants of Bang Kung. The local Chinese took up the defense for themselves at Wat Bang Kung but the Maengki Manya pressed on heavily. King Taksin assigned Phra Mahamontri Boonma as his vanguard with himself leading the Siamese troops to repel the Burmese at Bang Kung, going by sea with twenty vessels. The situation for the Chinese defenders of Bang Kung was critical but King Taksin managed to arrive on time and defeat the Burmese in the Battle of Bangkung in 1768. Maengki Manya the governor of Tavoy was defeated and retreated. The Battle of Bangkung was the first victory of King Taksin over the Burmese after his enthronement as king.

== Reunification of Siam ==
Taksin's campaigns of reunification, 1767-70/71

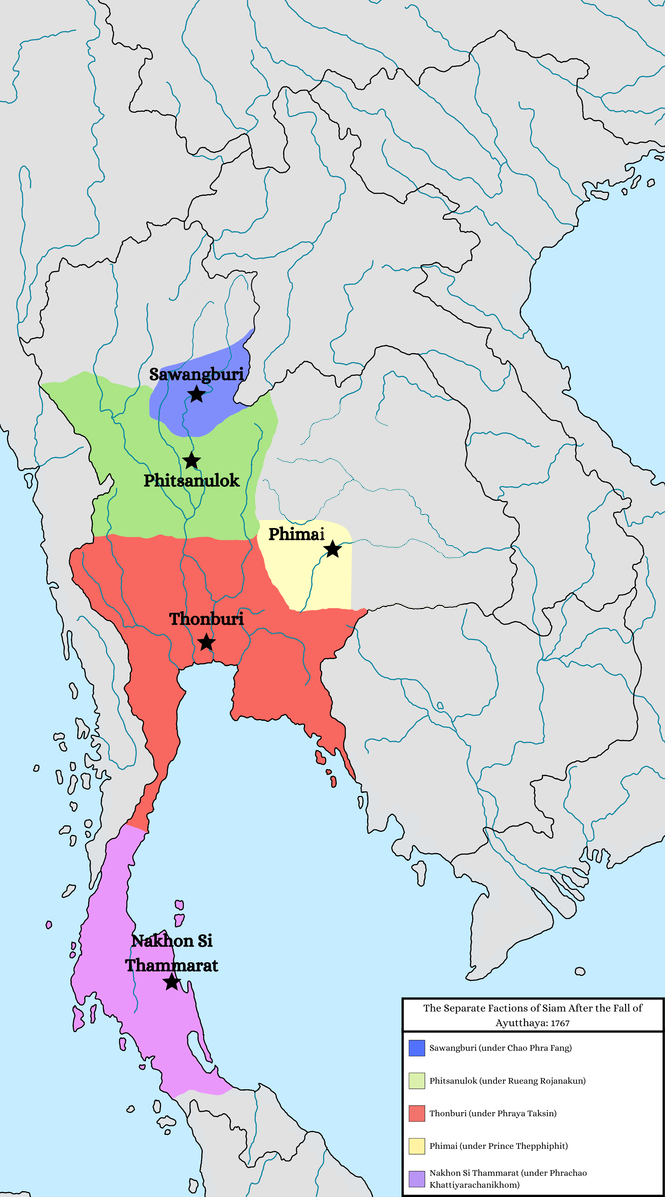
The independent Siamese states following the Fall of Ayutthaya, 1767

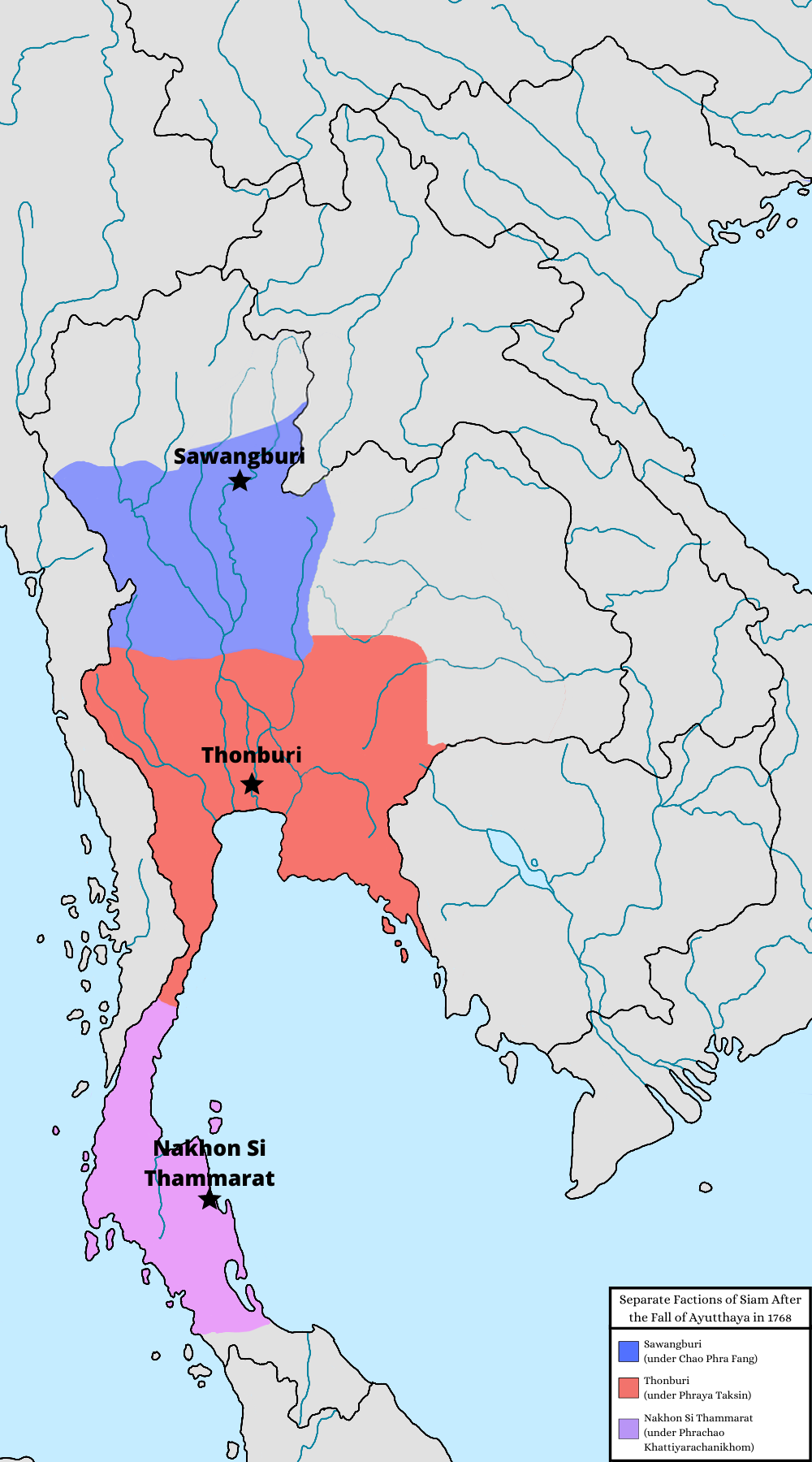
Following Taksin's conquest of Khorat and Chao Phra Fang's conquest of Phitsanulok, 1768

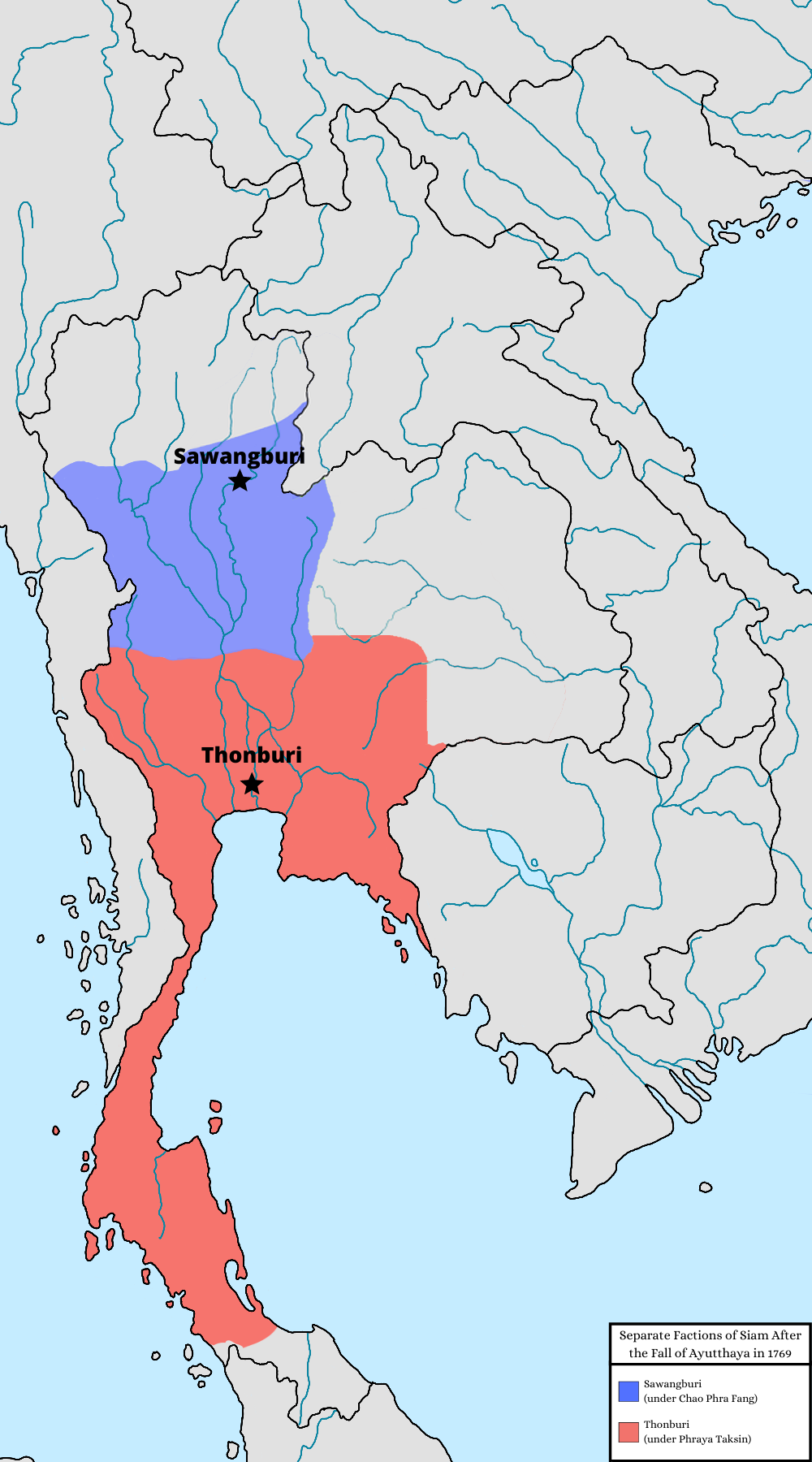
Following Taksin's conquest of Nakhon Si Thammarat, 1769

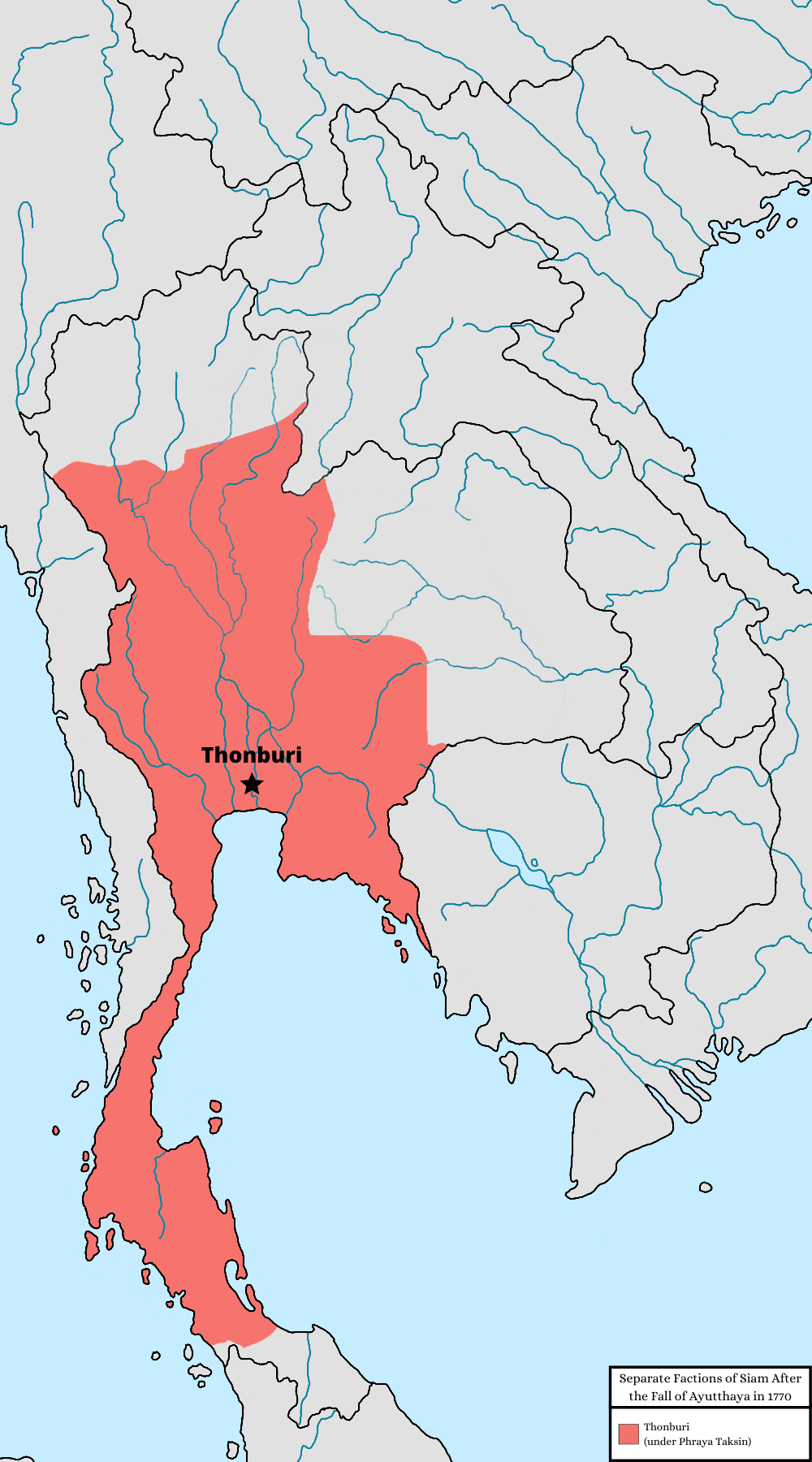
Following Taksin's conquest of Phitsanulok and Sawangkhaburi, 1770

=== Battle of Koeichai ===
After taking control of Lower Central Siam, King Taksin of Thonburi then began his campaigns to subjugate the rival warlord cliques and to unify Siam. He first moved against the Phitsanulok kingdom to the north, whose leader was Chaophraya Phitsanulok Rueang the governor of Phitsanulok before the Fall of Ayutthaya. Many noblemen of the former Ayutthayan elite class had fled to take refuge in regional centers including Phitsanulok, Nakhon Si Thammarat and Phimai, which had become the seats of rival kingdoms. In 1768, King Taksin marched his combined Chinese-Siamese armies north to attack Phitsanulok, reaching Koeichai in modern Nakhon Sawan province. Chaophraya Phitsanulok sent his commander Luang Kosa Yang (Thai: หลวงโกษายัง) down south to face Taksin at Koeichai, leading to the Battle of Koeichai in 1768. King Taksin and the Thonburi armies were defeated with the king himself got shot at his left leg. Taksin and his armies then retreated south to Thonburi.

After his victory at Koeichai, Chaophraya Phitsanulok Rueang declared himself king in Phitsanulok and underwent a coronation ceremony. Chaophraya Phitsanulok also appointed Phra Aksorn Sunthon (Thai: พระอักษรสุนทรศาสตร์ personal name Thongdi, father of the future King Rama I) as his Samuha Nayok or Prime Minister. However, Chaophraya Phitsanulok Rueang died shortly after from a coughing fit or tuberculosis. He was succeeded by his younger brother Phra In-akorn (Thai: พระอินทรอากร) as the leader of the Phitsanulok kingdom. Phra Aksorn Sunthon also fell ill and died in 1768. Phra In-akorn was proved not to be as competent as his elder brother. Chao Phra Fang, the monk-leader of the theocratic regime of Sawangkhaburi, marched to lay siege on Phitsanulok. Phra In-akorn managed to hold the city for three months until when Chao Phra Fang attacked and successfully seized Phitsanulok in 1768 or 1770. Phra In-akorn was executed and Phitsanulok was incorporated into Sawangkhaburi. The inhabitants and ammunitions of Phitsanulok were transported to Sawangkhaburi. However, the old nobles who had supported Chaophraya Phitsanulok Rueang gave Chao Phra Fang no supports. Those who were dissatisfied with the rule of Chao Phra Fang migrated south to Thonburi.

=== Subjugation of the Phimai kingdom ===
After his defeat and injury from Koeichai, in 1768, King Taksin recovered and initiated his new campaign to subjugate the Phimai kingdom to the northeast on the Khorat plateau, which was ruled by the Ayutthayan prince Kromma Muen Thepphiphit who was a son of King Borommakot. Prince Thepphiphit had been a major political figure as he, alone among the five regional contenders, laid claim to the fallen Ayutthayan dynasty and had attracted a large number of followers. Prince Thepphiphit's right hand was Phra Phimai, who served as the Prime Minister, and Phra Phimai's son Phraya Worawongsa governed the city of Nakhon Ratchasima or Khorat. Mongya, a Burmese commander defeated at Phosamton previously in 1767, fled to seek protection under Prince Thepphiphit at Phimai. Taksin declared that he would send armies to pursue and punish Mongya. King Taksin assigned his two commanders Phra Ratchawarin Thongduang (King Rama I) and Phra Mahamontri Boonma (Prince Sura Singhanat) as vanguard with the king himself leading the forces to subjugate the Phimai kingdom in 1768.

Prince Thepphiphit, upon being informed about the invasion from Thonburi, assigned his own forces to guard the Khorat city;

- Phraya Worawongsa would guard the Khorat town at Dan Khun Thot pass to the west of the city.
- Phra Phimai, his son Phraya Mahamontri and Mongya the Burmese commander would station at Choho to the north of Khorat city.

King Taksin led his Thonburi armies, crossing the Dong Phaya Fai pass to attack Nakhon Ratchasima. He sent the vanguard under Phra Ratchawarin and Phra Mahamontri to attack Phraya Worawongsa at Dan Khun Thot. King Taksin attacked the Phimai forces at Choho. The Thonburi forces eventually prevailed in both Choho and Dan Khun Thot. Phra Phimai, his son Phraya Mahamontri and Mongya were all captured and executed, while Phraya Worawongsa managed to flee to Siemreap in Cambodia. King Taksin commanded Phra Ratchawarin and Phra Mahamontri to pursue Phraya Worawongsa to Cambodia. However, they were unable to find Worawongsa. King Taksin was then able to take control of Nakhon Ratchasima.

Prince Thepphiphit at Phimai, upon learning of the defeats and deaths of his minister-generals, fled towards Laos. However, a minor Khorat official named Khun Chana (Thai: ขุนชนะ, personal name Boonkhong) managed to personally arrest Prince Thepphiphit and his family and brought them to Taksin. Taksin was rejoiced and rewarded Khun Chana by appointing him as Phraya Kamhaeng Songkhram the new governor of Nakhon Ratchasima under Thonburi. After his victory, King Taksin brought Prince Thepphiphit and his family to Thonburi. In an audience, Thepphiphit was summoned before Taksin. Prince Thepphiphit, taking the pride of an Ayutthayan prince, refused to kowtow before King Taksin. Prince Thepphiphit was then executed by being crushed to death with sandalwood club by the orders of King Taksin in 1768. The prince's daughter, Princess Ubol, became a consort of King Taksin. Phra Ratchawarin and Phra Mahamontri were promoted to Phraya Aphai Ronnarit and Phraya Anuchit Racha the commander of the right and left royal guard regiments, respectively.

=== Conquest of Southern Siam ===
After the Fall of Ayutthaya, Phra Palat Nu the deputy governor of Nakhon Si Thammarat (Ligor) who had been in charge of the city declared himself a ruler. His power extended over the whole Southern Siam. Phra Palat Nu became known as Chaophraya Nakhon Nu the ruler of Ligor. Nakhon Nu appointed his nephew-in-law Chan, who was a son of Chaophraya Chamnan Borrirak, as his Uparat or heir. The Malay sultanates that used to send bunga mas tributes to Ayutthaya nullified their tributary ties with Siam. In 1769, King Taksin of Thonburi initiated a new campaign to subjugate the Southern Siamese kingdom of Nakhon Nu. Taksin assigned Chaophraya Chakri Mud the Muslim Prime Minister to lead the Thonburi armies of 5,000 men down south to conquer Southern Siam. Other commanders included Phraya Yommaraj, Phraya Siphiphat and Phraya Phetchaburi. The Thonburi troops marched from Phetchaburi to Pathio. The Southern Siamese inhabitants of Pathio and Chumphon fled into the jungles in the face of Thonburi invasion. The local authorities offered no resistance. As the Thonburi forces approached Chaiya, the deputy governor of Chaiya submitted to Chakri Mud. King Taksin then made the deputy governor the new governor of Chaiya.

==== Battle of Thamak ====
Chaophraya Nakhon Nu, upon learning of the Thonburi invasion, assembled his Ligorian forces at Tha Mak (around modern Sichon District) to the north of the Nakhon Si Thammarat city. Chaophraya Chakri Mud led the Thonburi forces to cross the Tapi River and met the Ligorian forces at Thamak, leading to the Battle of Thamak in 1769. The Ligorian forces prevailed. Phraya Siphiphat and Phraya Phetchaburi were killed in battle. Khun Laksamana, a son of Chakri Mud, was captured by the Ligorians. Chakri Mud was then compelled to retreat his armies back to Chaiya. Phraya Yommaraj sent a report to King Taksin at Thonburi, accusing Chaophraya Chakri Mud of incompetency and sedition.

==== Conquest of Nakhon Si Thammarat ====
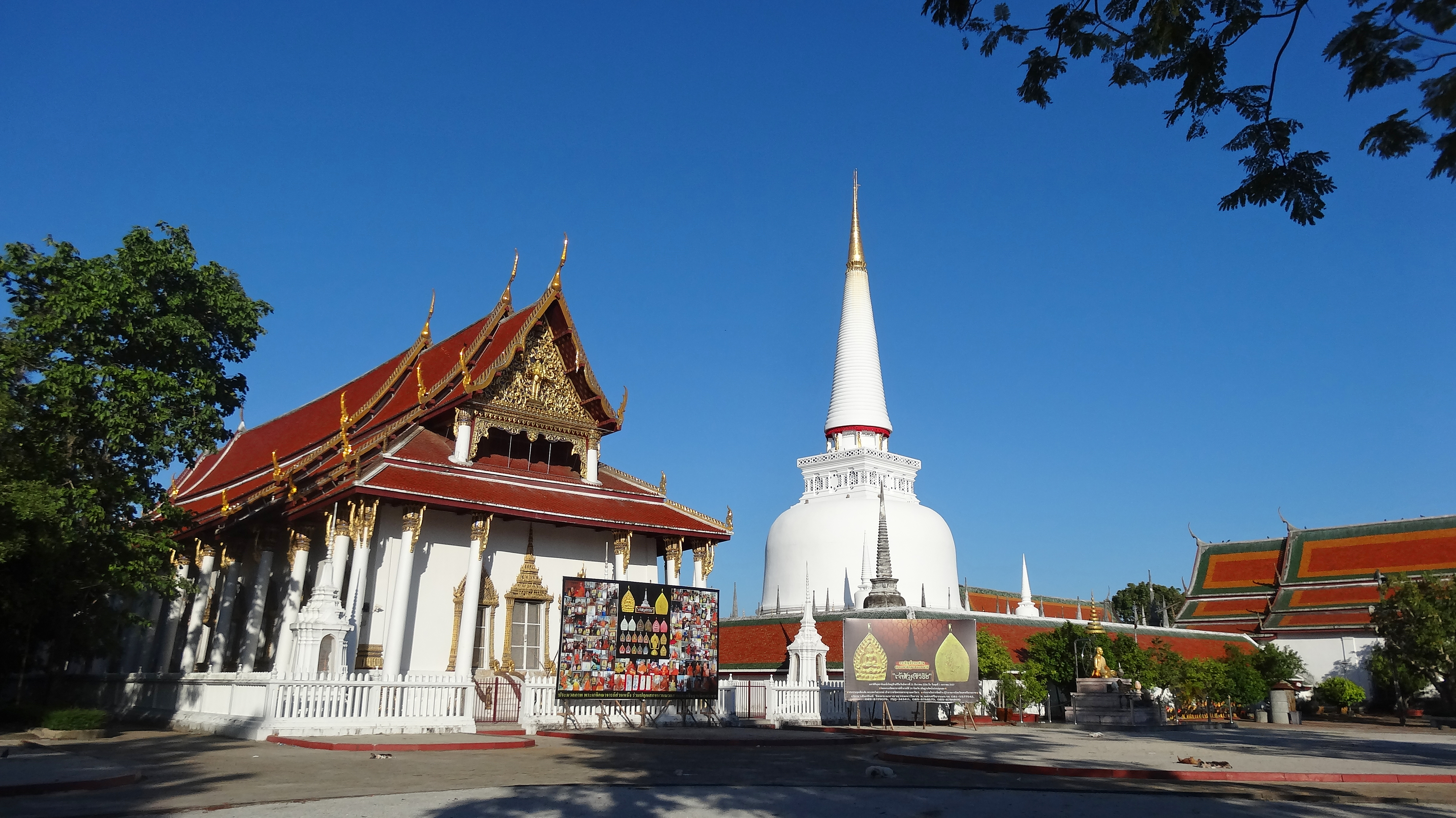
After his conquest of Nakhon Si Thammarat in September 1769, King Taksin held a three-day celebration event at the Wat Phra Mahathat temple in December 1769.

King Taksin realized that the campaign would be unsuccessful without his direct royal leadership. Taksin assembled his royal navy fleet of 10,000 men and 10,000 oarsmen. From Thonburi, Taksin sailed his royal fleet out of Paknam down south in August 1769. On August 20, the royal fleet met a very strong monsoon. According to Thai chronicles, King Taksin performed a ritual to appease the local seaborne spirits and the storm miraculously abated. Taksin disembarked at Chaiya and commanded Phraya Phichairacha to join with Chaophraya Chakri Mud to take Nakhon Si Thammarat as vanguard. Taksin then proceeded from Chaiya to Ligor, crossing the Tapi river.

The Ligorian forces had been taking position at Thamak. Phraya Yommaraj led the Thonburi forces to successfully defeat the Ligorians at Thamak. King Taksin and his royal fleet reached Nakhon Si Thammarat on September 21. Taksin led the attacks on the Ligor city. Chaophraya Nakhon Nu assigned his nephew-in-law and heir Chan to take the defensive position at Tha Pho in the northern outskirts. However, Chan was defeated by the royal forces of King Taksin. Chaophraya Nakhon Nu the ruler of Ligor then hurriedly took his family, including his daughters and his son-in-law Prince Phat, to flee to Songkhla. King Taksin took the city of Nakhon Si Thammarat on September 21, 1769. Chan the heir and followers of Nakhon Nu were captured by the Thonburi forces.

==== Pursuit of Chaophraya Nakhon Nu ====
At Songkhla, Luang Songkhla Vithien the governor of Songkhla took Nakhon Nu and his family to flee further to Pattani. Nakhon Nu was joined in refuge by the governors of Songkhla and Phatthalung (The governor of Phatthalung was Phra Phimol or Pia Pimon – the husband of Lady Chan). King Taksin embarked on the campaign to pursue and capture Chaophraya Nakhon Nu. Taksin commanded Phraya Phichairacha to lead the Thonburi armies and Chakri Mud to lead the navy to pursue Nakhon Nu to Songkhla. King Taksin and the royal fleet left Nakhon Si Thammarat on October 6 for Songkhla. Phichairacha and Chakri Mud were informed that Nakhon Nu had already taken refuge in Pattani so they sent a letter to the Sultan of Pattani, urging the sultan to surrender Nakhon Nu and his family. Sultan Muhammad of Pattani was in no position to protect the fugitives and decided to turn the governors of Ligor, Songkhla and Phatthalung over to the Siamese to avoid attack. Nakhon Nu and his family were then captured and sent to Taksin at Songkhla. King Taksin took his political captives back to Nakhon Si Thammarat on November 10, 1769.

King Taksin generously distributed cash and food to the local population of Nakhon Si Thammarat and gave money, rice and robes to the Buddhist monks. In December 1769, Taksin held a three-day celebration event at Wat Phra Mahathat in Ligor. Thonburi officials proposed to execute Chaophraya Nakhon Nu but King Taksin said otherwise. Taksin stated that Nakhon Nu, like Taksin himself, emerged as a leader out of the necessities and inevitability of the situation, in which anarchy prevailed, and should be credited with the defense of southern Siamese frontiers. King Taksin spared the life of Chaophraya Nakhon Nu but took him and his family back to Thonburi to be in custody in March 1770. Taksin appointed his own nephew Prince Chao Nara Suriyawong (Thai: เจ้านราสุริยวงศ์) to be the new governor of Nakhon Si Thammarat under the Thonburi kingdom.

==== Aftermath ====
Chaophraya Nakhon Nu spent seven years of exile in Thonburi. His daughter Lady Chim became a consort of King Taksin and bore him sons. Nakhon Nu and his household were initially placed under house arrest inside the Thonburi city wall. After two years, Nakhon Nu was allowed to establish his own residential compounds at Ban Kruay. Consort Chim was later made Queen Krom Boricha Phakdi Si Sudarak (Thai: กรมบริจาภักดีศรีสุดารักษ์). When Prince Nara Suriyawong of Ligor died in 1776, King Taksin decided to reinstate Nakhon Nu as the governor of Ligor. The king also granted a special status to Nakhon Nu as the 'King of Nakhon Si Thammarat' with the regnal title Phra Chao Khattiya Ratchanikhom (Thai: พระเจ้าขัตติยราชนิคม). Nakhon Nu would remain an autonomous ruler in Ligor until the end of Thonburi Kingdom in 1782.

=== Conquest of Northern Siam ===
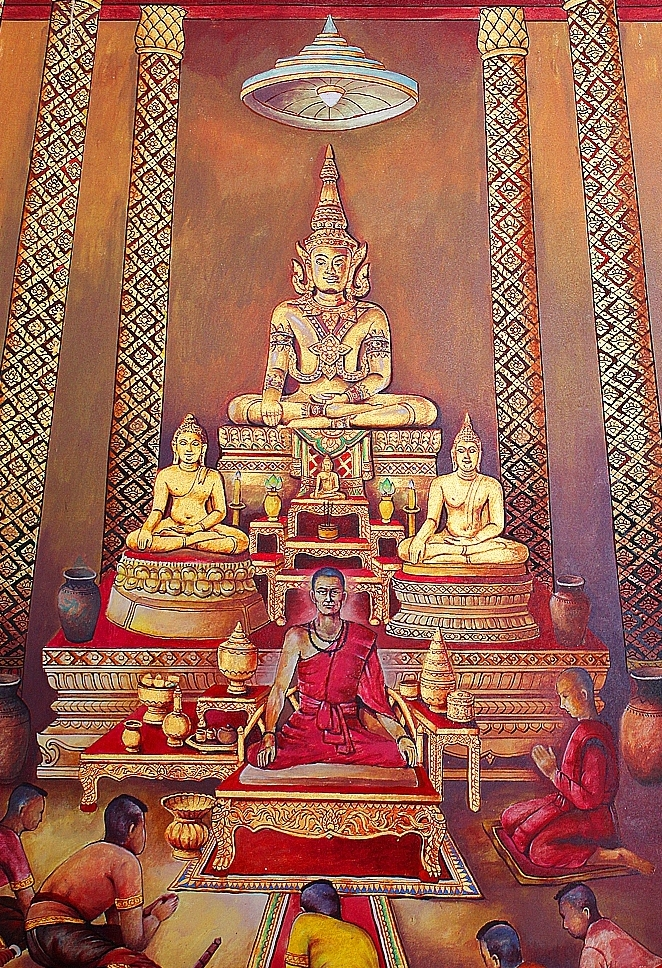
An artwork depicting Chao Phra Fang seating inside of the Wat Phra Fang temple.

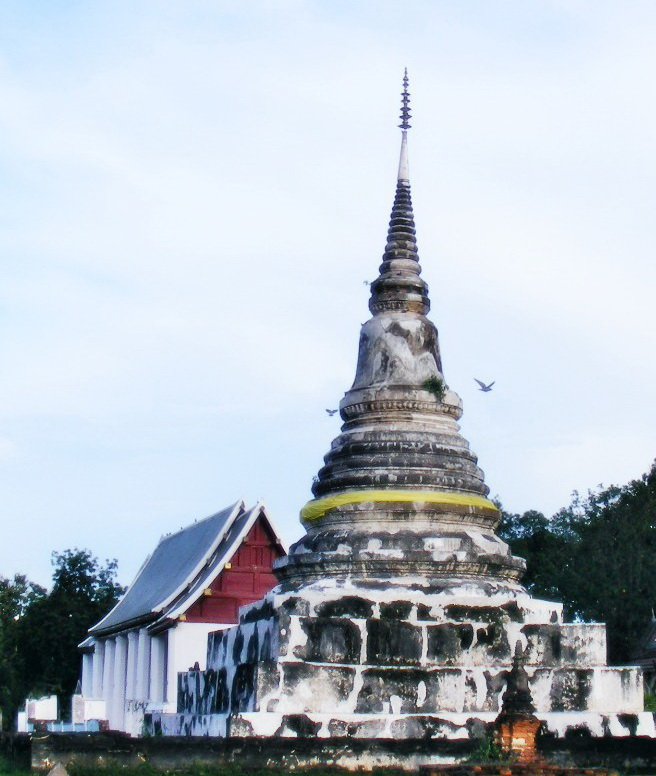
Wat Phra Fang Sawangkhaburi Muninat temple (Thai: วัดพระฝางสวางคบุรีมุนีนาถ), the Sawangkhaburi kingdom headquarter, in modern Tambon Pha Chuk, Uttaradit province.

==== Origin of Chao Phra Fang ====
Chao Phra Fang (Thai: เจ้าพระฝาง) was originally a Northern Siamese named Ruean (Thai: เรือน). He travelled to Ayutthaya to study Buddhist Pāli canon and was later appointed as an abbot or patriarch of the Wat Phra Fang temple in the town of Fang (now called Sawangkhaburi in modern Tambon Pha Chuk, Uttaradit) in the northernmost Siamese frontiers. After the Fall of Ayutthaya in 1767, the monk Ruean found a white elephant, which was the auspicious symbol of kingship. Ruean then declared himself a ruler in Sawangkhaburi, claiming supernatural powers. He was known epithetically as Chao Phra Fang or 'the Lord of Fang'. Chao Phra Fang appointed his fellow red-robe-clad monks to be his military commanders. Chao Phra Fang led his forces to lay siege and seize Phitsanulok, incorporating the whole Hua Mueang Neua (Thai: หัวเมืองเหนือ) or Northern Siamese territories into his theocratic regime. His dominions stretched from Sawangkhaburi in the north to Nakhon Sawan to the south, becoming a formidable opponent of King Taksin by 1770. King Taksin repeatedly condemned Chao Phra Fang as a heterodox monk as Chao Phra Fang had violated the Buddhist Vinaya by engaging in worldly affairs and warfare.

==== Conquest of Phitsanulok ====
In May 1770, Chao Phra Fang sent his forces south to pillage the towns of Uthaithai and Chainat for food and resources. The enraged King Taksin was then poised to subjugate and finish the Sawangkhaburi kingdom once and for all. On July 11, 1770, King Taksin assembled his troops of 10,000 men to attack Phitsanulok in the north;

- Chaophraya Phichairacha (Thai: เจ้าพระยาพิชัยราชา) would lead the forces of 5,000 men to attack Phitsanulok, taking the western route.
- As Phraya Yommaraj had died, Taksin appointed Phraya Anuchitracha Boonma to be the new Phraya Yommaraj. King Taksin assigned Phraya Yommaraj Boonma to lead the forces of 5,000 men to attack Phitsanulok, taking the eastern route.

King Taksin also raised his own royal army of 12,000 men to invade Phitsanulok. Phraya Phiphit the acting Phrakhlang, in the name of Thonburi court, had earlier requested the purchase of Western flintlock firearms from the Supreme Government of the Dutch East Indies at Batavia in January 1769. In July 1770, the 2,200 flintlock muskets arrived in Thonburi from Batavia and Terengganu. King Taksin left Thonburi to the north with his royal forces on July 21, 1770. The king marched through Nakhon Sawan and reached Pakphing, an important strategic position locating south of the Phitsanulok city, on August 18, outpacing his vanguard troops who had not yet arrived.

Chao Phra Fang sent Luang Kosa Yang, who had earlier served Chaophraya Phitsanulok Rueang and had previously defeated King Taksin in the Battle of Koeichai in 1768, to defend Phitsanulok. King Taksin sent his royal forces to quickly take Phitsanulok on August 8, 1770, defeating his former nemesis Luang Kosa Yang who fled and disappeared. King Taksin entered Phitsanulok the next day on August 19, worshipping Phra Phuttha Chinnasi and Phra Phuttha Chinnaraj Buddha images at Wat Phra Si Rattana Mahathat in Phitsanulok. Phraya Yommaraj Boonma arrived in Phitsanulok nine days later and Chaophraya Phichairacha another two days later. Taksin then ordered his two vanguard commanders to proceed to Sawangkhaburi. The water level in the Nan River was low and difficult for the riverine fleet to get through. King Taksin then said that the water level would soon rise. The waters rose three days later, miraculously.

==== Conquest of Sawangkhaburi ====
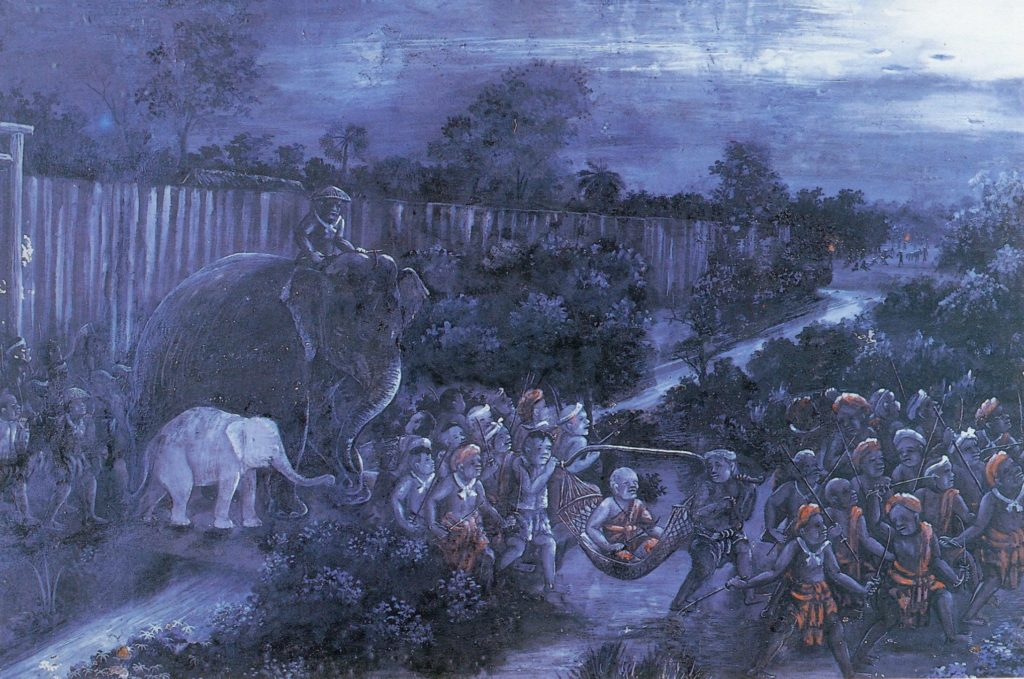
Chao Phra Fang fled from Sawangkhaburi in late night with a white elephant and its mother. This illustration was painted by Luang Suwannasit (Sai) according to the royal decree of king Chulalongkorn in 1887.

In August 1770, the two vanguard commanders; Chaophraya Phichairacha and Phraya Yommaraj Boonma proceeded to attack Sawangkhaburi. The town of Fang Sawangkhaburi itself was a small wooden fort without a proper city wall. The Thonburi forces laid siege on the town. During the siege, an elephant under the care of Chao Phra Fang gave birth to a young white elephant cub. White elephant was the symbol of the sacred kingship. Chao Phra Fang was shocked as this might be an omen suggesting that the kingship belonged to Taksin. King Taksin, upon learning about the white elephant, was also determined to possess the elephant. Thonburi besiegers easily took Sawangkhaburi. Chao Phra Fang fled into hiding along with the young white elephant.

King Taksin and the royal riparian fleet left Phitsanulok on August 13, sailing north to Sawangkhaburi. Three days later, on August 16, 1770, King Taksin was informed that Sawangkhaburi had fallen to the Thonburi forces and Chao Phra Fang had escaped. Taksin encamped his armies at Khung Taphao. Minor officials managed to catch the young white elephant and brought it to the king on August 19. On August 30, Taksin marched eastward to the Nam Muet canal in efforts to pursue Chao Phra Fang but instead met with Northern Siamese people who had fled into the forests during the warfare. King Taksin encouraged the dispersed people to return to their homes with the king himself returning to Khung Taphao. Taksin then ordered a large-scale search for Chao Phra Fang but was not successful. The Thonburi forces captured the monks who had been military commanders under Chao Phra Fang. King Taksin had them defrocked and deported to Thonburi to be imprisoned.

==== Purge of Northern Siamese Sangha ====
On September 25, 1770, King Taksin at Sawangkhaburi declared that all of the Northern Siamese Sangha monks of the Hua Mueang Nuea or Northern Siam were followers of the heretical Chao Phra Fang and, therefore, corrupted. Taksin then ordered the massive laicization of the whole Northern Siamese Sangha. Those who wished to retain their monkhood should undergo a traditional judicial trial. Monks were put to dive into the water in a specific time to prove their innocence as their own sanctity would help them accomplish the task. Those monks who managed to dive long enough were allowed to retain their monkhood, while those who failed were defrocked, whipped and tattooed. King Taksin presided over a grand ceremony to purify the Northern Siamese Sangha, in which sacrifices were made and white clothes were raised to form the holy compounds for the monks to perform their miraculous trials. These events served to purge Northern Siam of any remaining Chao Phra Fang's sympathizers. The robes of the defrocked monks were burnt to get the dye to paint the chedi of Wat Phra Fang Sawangkhaburi temple.

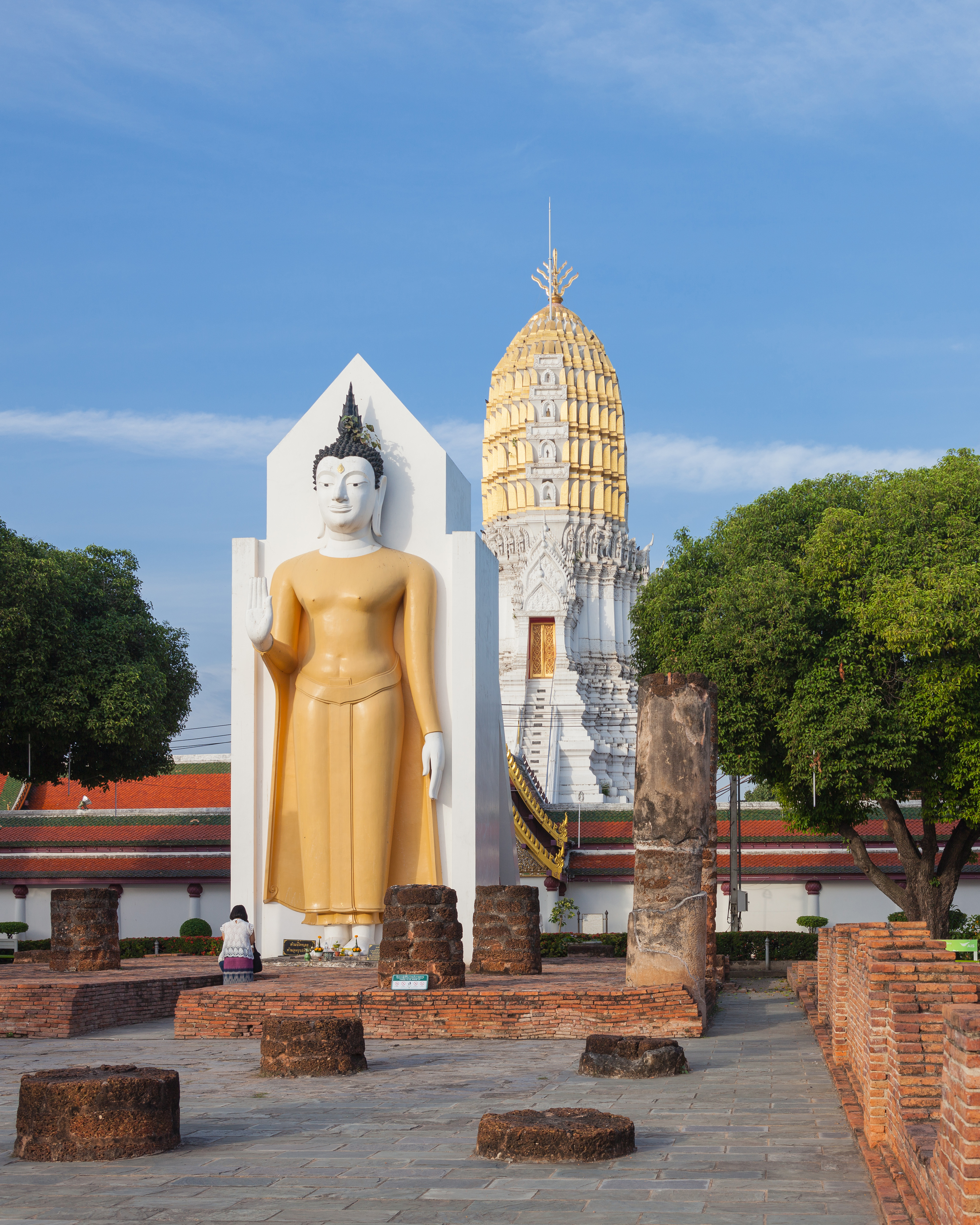
After his conquest of Phitsanulok and Northern Siam, King Taksin held a three-day commemoration event at the Wat Phra Si Rattana Mahathat temple in Phitsanulok in October 1770.

After the purge of Northern Siamese monks, King Taksin appointed fifty Central Siamese monks from Thonburi to be the abbots of various head temples in Northern Siam in Sawangkhaburi, Phichai, Phitsanulok, Sukhothai and Thung Yang. King Taksin held a three-day celebration event at Wat Phra Fang Sawangkhaburi temple on October 14. On October 21, 1770, Taksin returned to Phitsanulok and held another celebration event at Wat Phra Si Rattana Mahathat.

==== Aftermath ====
As King Taksin took control of Hua Mueang Nuea or Northern Siam, the region became the frontline battlefield between Siam and the Burmese invading from the north and the west. In October 1770, Taksin appointed his ablest and most trusted military commanders to be the governors of Northern Siamese cities;

- Chaophraya Phichairacha was made Chaophraya Sawankhalok (Thai: เจ้าพระยาสวรรคโลก) the governor of Sawankhalok town.
- Phraya Yommaraj Boonma became Chaophraya Surasi Phitsanuwathiraj (Thai: เจ้าพระยาสุรสีห์พิษณุวาธิราช) the governor of Phitsanulok.
- Phra Chiang-ngoen became Phraya Sukhothai the governor of the Sukhothai town.
- Thongdee was made Phraya Phichai the governor of Phichai town.
- Phraya Anurakphuthon (Thai: พระยาอนุรักษ์ภูธร) was made Chaophraya Nakhon Sawan (Thai: เจ้าพระยานครสวรรค์) the governor of Nakhon Sawan.

Chao Phra Fang was never found and simply disappeared from history. Prince Damrong suggested that Chao Phra Fang might take refuge with the Burmese in Lanna to the north and might have instigated the Burmese to subsequently attack the Northern Siamese border towns of Sawankhalok in 1771 and Phichai in 1772–1773.

== Invasion of Hà Tiên ==
The last of Taksin's rivals, the Cantonese merchant ruler of Hà Tiên (Banteay Mas), Mạc Thiên Tứ, threatened Taksin's newfound hegemony over Siam by repeatedly attempting to destabilize the new Thonburi Kingdom while Taksin was away from his capital. In a final response, in 1771, Taksin launched a retaliatory land and naval assault on Hà Tiên, which resulted in Mo Thien Tu's flight from the island, ending the last serious threat to Taksin's conquests.

== Conclusion ==
Thonburi's domain after the reunification (1780)

With King Taksin's attack on the port of Hà Tiên in 1771, putting its Cantonese merchant-prince to flight, King Taksin had effectively quelled the last of his rivals over his dominance of a reunified Siam. Taksin managed to occupy almost all of the traditional Ayutthayan territories (with the exception of the Tenasserim Coast) and temporarily captured Hà Tiên, indicating Taksin's future ambitions of expanding outside Ayutthaya's sphere of influence. After the Fall of Ayutthaya in 1767, Siam ran the risk of permanent fragmentation into different Thai states. Among the regional leaders, only Taksin made his visionary intention clear that Siam should be unified under his rulership. Efforts by King Taksin to expel the Burmese, subjugate the rival regimes and to unify the kingdom made sure that Siam would remain cohesive as a political and cultural entity. In response to the calamity of 1767, a new Siam emerged with confidence in its ability to lead the region. The successes enabled the Siamese sphere of influence to expand even further afield, within a decade or so.

Burma and China finally agreed to a truce in December 1769 and the Sino-Burmese War was reluctantly put to the end. It took a while for the Burmese King Hsinbyushin to realize in 1772 that Siam had recovered and emerged under the new Thonburi regime as the Burmese king initiated his new campaigns to subjugate Siam. However, Siam proved to be more prepared in the face of Burmese invasions than it used to be previously. This eventually culminated in the Burmese–Siamese War (1775–1776), a war that could have destroyed Siam, according to historian Nidhi Eoseewong, and devastated the Northern Cities and Lan Na, depopulating the two regions until well into the 19th century.

== See also ==
- King Taksin the Great
- Thonburi Kingdom
