= Chaophraya Nakhon (Nu) =

Thai politician

Chao Phraya Nakhon Si Thammarat Nu
- เจ้าพระยานครศรีธรรมราช (หนู)

Ruler of Nakhon Si Thammarat (1st tenure)
- In office 1767–1769
- Preceded by: Phraya Ratchasuphawadi
- Succeeded by: Prince Nara Suriyawong

Ruler of Nakhon Si Thammarat (2nd tenure)
- In office 1776–1784
- Monarchs: Taksin; Rama I
- Preceded by: Prince Nara Suriyawong
- Succeeded by: Chaophraya Nakhon Phat

Personal details
- Born: Ayutthaya, Siam
- Died: Bangkok, Siam
- Spouse: Lady Thongnio
- Children: Queen Boricha Phakdi Si Sudarak

Phra Chao Khattiya Ratchanikhom (Thai: พระเจ้าขัตติยราชนิคม), or Chaophraya Nakhon Si Thammarat (Thai: เจ้าพระยานครศรีธรรมราช), personal name Nu (Thai: หนู), was the leader of the Nakhon Si Thammarat (Ligor) regime of Southern Siam after the Fall of Ayutthaya in 1767 until his subjugation by King Taksin in 1769. Also known as Chao Nakhon (Thai: เจ้านคร) or Phra Palat Nu (Thai: พระปลัดหนู), he became an autonomous ruler of Nakhon Si Thammarat again from 1777 to 1784 under the Thonburi kingdom.

== Biography ==
Chaophraya Nakhon Nu was formerly an aristocrat in the royal Siamese capital city of Ayutthaya. He had been holding the title of Luangsit Naiwen (Thai: หลวงสิทธิ์นายเวร) as one of the king's royal pages. Around 1759, King Ekkathat of Ayutthaya appointed Phraya Ratchasuphawadi as the governor of Nakhon Si Thammarat and also named Luangsit Naiwen as the vice-governor with the title of Phra Palat. Luangsit Naiwen Nu then moved from Ayutthaya to the south to assume his responsibility in Ligor. Nu married Lady Thongnio, a daughter of a local Chinese merchant in Ligor, and had daughters with her.

During the Burmese Invasion of Ayutthaya in 1765, Phraya Ratchasuphawadi the governor of Ligor was commanded by the royal court to bring troops to defend Ayutthaya against the Burmese, leaving his deputy Phra Palat Nu in charge of the Ligor city. However, Phraya Ratchasuphawadi failed in his duties and ended up being imprisoned in Ayutthaya.

Ayutthaya fell to the Burmese in April 1767, ending the Ayutthaya kingdom. Without central authority, Siam descended into chaos and anarchy. Many local lords declared themselves sovereigns and rulers. Phra Palat Nu, who had been in charge of Nakhon Si Thammarat, which was the Mueang Ek or administrative center of Southern Siam, declared himself an independent lord. He was known colloquially as Chao Nakhon or the 'Lord of Nakhon (Si Thammarat)'. Chao Nakhon Nu asserted his power over the whole Southern Siam. He made his nephew-in-law Chan, who was a son of Chaophraya Chamnan Borrirak, his Uparat or heir. Nakhon Nu also appointed his relative Vithien as Luang Songkhla or the governor of Songkhla and Phra Phimol (husband of Lady Chan) as the governor of Phatthalung.

=== Subjugation by King Taksin ===
In 1769, King Taksin of Thonburi initiated his campaign to subjugate the Southern Siamese regime of Ligor as a part of his reunification of Siam. He sent his commander Chaophraya Chakri Mut to lead the Thonburi armies down south to attack Ligor. Nakhon Nu sent Ligorian forces to face the Thonburi forces at Thamak (around modern Sichon District to the north of Nakhon Si Thammarat), leading to the Battle of Thamak in 1769. The Ligorian forces prevailed. Chaophraya Chakri Mut and his Thonburi armies were defeated and retreated back to Chaiya.

After his initial defeat, King Taksin decided to personally command the armies. Taksin led the royal Thonburi fleet down south with 10,000 men in August 1769. The royal forces defeated the Ligorians at Thamak and proceeded to lay siege on Nakhon Si Thammarat. Chao Nakhon Nu assigned his heir Chan to defend the city. It is said that King Taksin sent his agent to secretly meet with Chan, urging him to defect and switch side. The battle occurred at Tha Pho in the northern outskirts of Ligor, in which Chan was defeated and captured. Nakhon Si Thammarat fell to King Taksin on September 21, 1769. Nakhon Nu took his family, including his daughters and his son-in-law Prince Phat, to seek refuge at Songkhla.

King Taksin ordered Chaophraya Chakri Mut and Chaophraya Phichairacha to pursue Nakhon Nu. Nakhon Nu, along with Luang Songkhla Vithien and Phra Phimol of Phatthalung, fled to Pattani under the protection of Sultan Muhammad of Pattani. The pursuing Thonburi forces urged the sultan to surrender the three governors. Sultan Muhammad was in no position to protect these fugitives and decided to hand over them to Taksin. Nakhon Nu and his family were captured and brought back to King Taksin at Ligor. Officials proposed to execute Nakhon Nu but Taksin chose to spare his life, citing that Nakhon Nu, like Taksin himself, became the leader out of necessities and should be credited with the defense of Southern Siamese frontiers. King Taksin made his own nephew Prince Nara Suriyawong the new ruler of Ligor. Nakhon Nu and his family were taken to Thonburi in March 1770.

=== Exile in Thonburi ===
Chaophraya Nakhon Nu spent seven years of exile in Thonburi. His daughter Chim became a consort of King Taksin and bore him sons. Nakhon Nu and his family were initially placed under house arrest inside the Thonburi city wall. After two years, Nakhon Nu was allowed to establish his own residential compounds at Ban Kruay.

=== Ruler of Nakhon Si Thammarat ===
In 1776, Prince Nara Suriyawong of Ligor died. King Taksin elevated Consort Chim, Nakhon Nu's daughter, to the position and title of Queen Krom Boricha Phakdi Si Sudarak (Thai: กรมบริจาภักดีศรีสุดารักษ์). Lady Prang, another daughter of Nakhon Nu, also soon became a consort of the king. Taksin decreed on October 1, 1776 to reinstate Nakhon Nu as an autonomous tributary ruler of Nakhon Si Thammarat with the regnal name of Phra Chao Khattiya Ratchanikhom (Thai: พระเจ้าขัตติยราชนิคม). His wife Lady Thongnio also became the Queen of Ligor. Nakhon Nu made his son-in-law Prince Phat as his Uparat or heir this time. Nakhon Nu, as the 'King of Nakhon Si Thammarat', wielded a great autonomous power, was allowed to maintain his own 'court' and even Chatusadom ministers. In 1777, Nakhon Nu proposed to King Taksin to conduct a campaign to subjugate the Northern Malay Sultanates. Taksin refused, however, saying that the defense of borders from Burmese incursions was more important.

Nakhon Nu maintained male court dancers, which would later evolve to become the Menora dance of modern Southern Thailand. In 1780, King Taksin acquired the Emerald Buddha from Vientiane. Taksin ordered Nakhon Nu to bring his traditional male dancer troupe from Nakhon Si Thammarat to perform at Thonburi in the celebration of Emerald Buddha in competition with Taksin's female court performers.

The Thonburi kingdom ended in 1782 and was replaced by the new regime of Rattanakosin kingdom. The new king Rama I found the autonomous power of Ligorian ruler to be excessive so he curbed the power of Ligor by demoting the position of the ruler of Ligor to be a 'governor' as it had used to be. Chaophraya Nakhon Nu did not cooperate with the new Bangkok government in the Sak Lek or conscription of Southern Siamese people. King Rama I also repeatedly summoned Nakhon Nu to Bangkok to ensure loyalty but Nakhon Nu defied and refused to go. Uparat Phat, Nakhon Nu's heir, filed a case against Nakhon Nu to Bangkok, accusing his father-in-law of incompetency and disorientation. Nakhon Nu was finally sacked from his position as the governor of Ligor in 1784 and was taken to custody in Bangkok. King Rama I made Uparat Phat Chaophraya Nakhon the new governor of Nakhon Si Thammarat.

Nakhon Nu presumably lived last years of his life in custody in his residence in Ban Kruay in Bangkok. Nakhon Nu and his wife Thongnio died at Bangkok in unspecified years. Their ashes were brought by Nakhon Phat to Nakhon Si Thammarat to be interred at Wat Chang.

== Family and Issue ==
Chaophraya Nakhon Nu married Lady Thongnio, daughter of a local Chinese merchant in Nakhon Si Thammarat named Chin Pat (Thai: จีนปาด). They had daughters;

- Lady Nuan, became the wife of Prince Phat. She died in 1776 before her husband became Chaophraya Nakhon Phat the governor of Nakhon Si Thammarat in 1784. Her children included;
  - Consort Nuiyai (Thai: เจ้าจอมมารดานุ้ยใหญ่), a royal consort to King Rama I. She bore Prince Arunnothai in 1785. Prince Arunnothai later became Prince Maha Sakdi Phonlasep. Consort Nuiyai died in 1827.
- Lady Chim, became a consort of King Taksin and bore him children. In 1777, Consort Chim was elevated to the rank of queen with title Krom Boricha Phakdi Si Sudarak. Her children with King Taksin included;
  - Prince Chaofa Thatphong (Thai: เจ้าฟ้าทัศพงษ์), later given a demoted title of Phra Phongnarin (Thai: พระพงษ์นรินทร์). He became a royal physician to King Rama II, had children and descendants.
  - Prince Chaofa Thatphai (Thai: เจ้าฟ้าทัศไภย), later given a demoted title of Phra In-aphai (Thai: พระอินทร์อภัย). Like his brother, he became a royal physician to King Rama II but was put to death in 1815 due to his alleged romantic relationship with one of the king's consorts. He has daughter, Noi, who became a royal consort to King Mongkut and bore two princes.
  - Phra Narenthraracha (Thai: พระนเรนทรราชา); he had children and descendants.
  - Princess Panchapapi, became the consort of Prince Kromma Khun Itsaranurak, son of an elder sister of King Rama I. She had children.
- Lady Prang; she followed her sister Lady Chim to live in the court of Thonburi and soon became a consort of King Taksin. She was pregnant with the king in 1776. However, the king had promised to give away Consort Prang to be the new wife of Uparat Phat, whose wife Lady Nuan was Prang's own sister and had just died. Consort Prang became the new ceremonial wife of Uparat Phat and bore the king's son, Noi, at Ligor in August 1776. Noi later became Chaophraya Nakhon Noi the governor of Ligor from 1811 to 1838.

Chaophraya Nakhon (Nu) House of Nu Born: ? Died: ?
Regnal titles
New title	King of Nakhon Si Thammarat; 1767–1769	Succeeded by Nara Suriyawong
Preceded by Nara Suriyawong	King of Nakhon Si Thammarat; 1776–1782	Title dissolved
Political offices
Preceded by Ratchasuphawadi	Governor of Nakhon Si Thammarat; Acting; 1765–1767	Vacant Title next held by Himself
Vacant Title last held by Himself	Governor of Nakhon Si Thammarat; 1782–1784	Succeeded by Phat
