= Chaophraya Chakri (Mud) =

- เจ้าพระยาจักรี (หมุด)

Samuhanayok (Chief minister) of Ayutthaya Kingdom
- In office 1767–1774
- Monarch: Taksin
- Preceded by: Chaophraya Phrakhlang
- Succeeded by: Chaophraya Chakri Thongduang

Personal details
- Born: 1727
- Died: 1774 (aged 46–47)
- Children: Phraya Yommaraj Mat; Phraya Ratchawangsan Wang
- Parents: Khun Laksamana Boonyang (father); Lady Dao (mother)

Chaophraya Chakri (Thai: เจ้าพระยาจักรี), personal name Mahmud, Mud or Mood (Thai: หมุด, RTGS: Mut; 1727–1774), was the Samuha Nayok or the Prime Minister of Siam serving during the early years of Thonburi Period under King Taksin. He was of a Muslim Persian-Malay descent and a descendant of Sultan Suleiman of Singora. He was colloquially known as Chaophraya Chakri Khaek (Thai: เจ้าพระยาจักรีแขก), or "the Muslim Prime Minister".

== Ancestry ==
The Sultanate of Singora, based on the fort of Khao Daeng across the water from modern Songkhla city, was founded by Datuk Mogul around the early seventeenth century. Datuk Mogul was said to be of the Persian descent and hailed from central Java. The Sultan of Singora owed traditional tributes of bunga mas to the Siamese kingdom of Ayutthaya. Datuk Mogul died in 1620 and was succeeded by his son Suleiman. In 1642, Sultan Suleiman of Singora declared independence from Siam. Sultan Suleiman had three sons; Mustafa, Hussein and Hassan. Sultan Suleiman died in 1668, to be succeeded by his eldest son Mustafa. However, King Narai of Ayutthaya sent armies to subjugate and conquer the Singora sultanate by 1685. Sultan Mustafa, his brothers Hussein, Hassan and their family were captured and deported to Ayutthaya, where they became officials in the Siamese bureaucracy. Mustafa became the governor of Chaiya, Hussein the governor of Phatthalung and Hassan became Phraya Ratchabangsan the commander of the Krom Asa Cham (Thai: กรมอาสาจาม) or the Cham-Malay naval mercenary regiment. Hassan had a son named Boonyang, who became Khun Laksamana serving in Siam.

== Biography ==
=== Early life ===
Khun Laksamana Boonyang married Lady Dao and bore a son named Mahmud or Mud in 1727. Mud was, therefore, a great-grandson of Sultan Suleiman of Singora. As a member of the Siamese nobility class, Mud joined the court of Ayutthaya as a royal page. In the reign of King Ekkathat, the last King of Ayutthaya, Mud was a royal page with the title Luang Sak Naiwen (Thai: หลวงศักดิ์นายเวร). In 1765, King Ekkathat sent Mud on an official inspection trip to Chanthaburi. However, the Burmese then invaded and laid siege on Ayutthaya, preventing Mud from returning to the royal city. Mud got stranded at Chanthaburi as Ayutthaya fell to the Burmese in April 1767 and Pu Lan (普蘭), the Chinese Phraya Chanthaburi the governor of Chanthaburi, declared himself an overlord. Phraya Chanthaburi Pu Lan came into competition with Phraya Tak, who was based in Rayong. In June 1767, Phraya Tak marched his armies from Rayong to successfully attack and conquer Chanthaburi. Mud, who had been staying in Chanthaburi, submitted to Phraya Tak and joined his retinue. After his coronation in 1767, King Taksin made Mud the Samuha Nayok or the Prime Minister of Siam with the title of Chaophraya Chakri.

=== Southern Siam ===
Due to his Persian-Malay descent and his familial connection to the Krom Asa Cham, Chaophraya Chakri Mud was tasked with responsibility for the naval warfare. In 1769, King Taksin commanded Chaophraya Chakri Mud to launch a naval campaign, with 5,000 men, to subjugate the Southern Siamese regime of Chaophraya Nakhon Nu, which was based on Nakhon Si Thammarat (Ligor). This expedition ended in failure, however, as Chakri Mud was defeated in the Battle of Thamak and his son Khun Laksamana was captured by the Ligorian forces. King Taksin of Thonburi, soon after, had to personally conduct the campaigns so that he managed to conquer Southern Siam. After the Thonburi forces had taken Ligor in September 1769, Chaophraya Nakhon Nu the ruler of Ligor fled to Songkhla. King Taksin ordered Chaophraya Chakri Mud to lead a naval force to pursue Nakhon Nu. Chakri Mud learnt that Nakhon Nu had fled to Pattani so he wrote a letter to Sultan Muhammad of Pattani, urging the sultan to turn over Nakhon Nu. Sultan Muhammad of Pattani, avoiding Siamese attacks, decided to hand over Nakhon Nu to Chakri Mud.

=== Chiang Mai ===
In March 1771, King Taksin led a riverine fleet to the north in efforts to attack the Burmese-held Chiang Mai. Taksin soon realized that he had to disembark his boats at Phichai in order to continue by land to Chiang Mai. The king ordered Chaophraya Chakri Mud to take care of all the boats at Phichai when he was away in Chiang Mai. This campaign was not successful, however.

=== Siamese–Vietnamese War ===
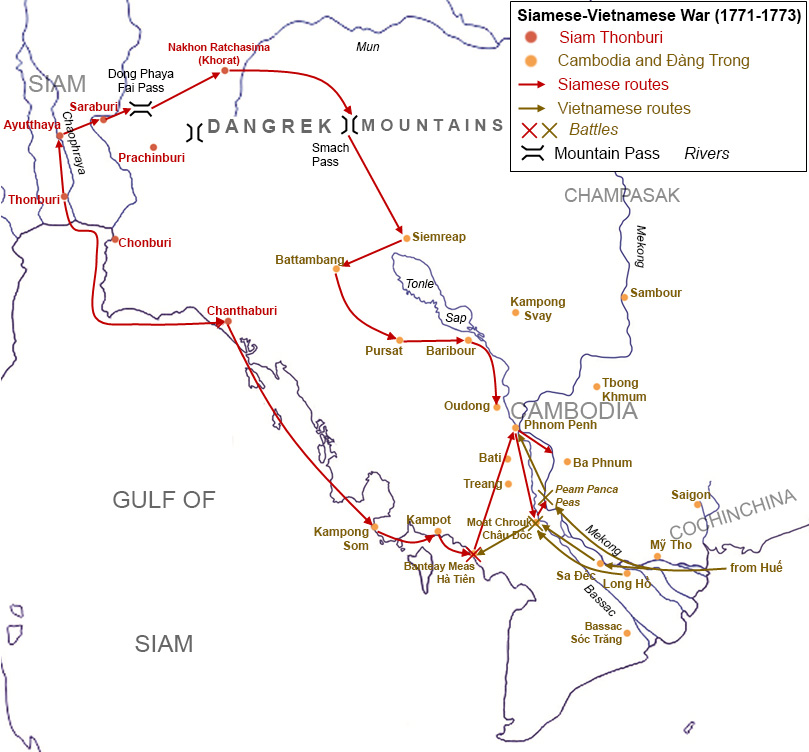
Chaophraya Chakri Mud partook in King Taksin's invasion of Hà Tiên in November 1771. Chakri Mud led Siamese riparian fleet further into Cochinchina but was defeated by Tống Phước Hiệp at Châu Đốc.

In November 1771, Chaophraya Chakri Mud joined his lord King Taksin in the naval expedition against the port city-state of Hà Tiên, ruled by the Cantonese ruler Mạc Thiên Tứ, to the east. Chaophraya Chakri had his own naval regiment composing of 649 men. Chaophraya Chakri Mud, together with Phraya Phiphit Chen Lian and Phraya Phichai Aisawan Yang Jinzong, led the naval attacks on Hà Tiên. After seizing Hà Tiên, King Taksin and Chaophraya Chakri Mud pursued the Cambodian King Ang Ton and Mạc Thiên Tứ into Cambodia and Cochinchina. Chakri Mud met a local Cambodian resistance force near Ba Phnum and defeated them. In December 1771, Chaophraya Chakri Mud proceeded his riverine fleet along the Bassac River towards Châu Đốc. However, he was defeated by the Vietnamese governor of Long Hồ Tống Phước Hiệp at Châu Đốc, losing his Siamese men and ships.

As the war reached stalemate, King Taksin ordered Chaophraya Chakri Mud the guard the Bassac front against Vietnamese counter-offensives. The king himself returned to Thonburi in December 1771. In July 1772, the Nguyen Lord Nguyễn Phúc Thuần sent Vietnamese forces to reclaim Cambodia and to expel the Siamese. The Vietnamese commander Nguyễn Cửu Đàm and the Cambodian commander Oknha Yumreach Tol, with the forces of 10,000 men, attacked Chaophraya Chakri at Peam Panca Peas (in modern Prey Veng). Chaophraya Chakri Mud was defeated, leading the Vietnamese to resume control over Cambodia. As King Taksin found out that Siamese holdings in Cambodia were untenable, he decided to order the general retreat of Siamese forces from Cambodia in 1773.

=== Death ===
Chaophraya Chakri Mud presumably died in 1774. He was succeeded as the Samuha Nayok or Siamese Prime Minister by Chaophraya Chakri Thongduang who later became King Rama I. The Kubur grave of Chaophraya Chakri Mud is present at Tonson Mosque in Bangkok.

== Family ==
Chaophraya Chakri (Mud) had three recorded sons;

- Mat (Thai: หมัด); became Phraya Yommaraj the Minister of Nakhonban or Police Bureau in 1774. Phraya Yommaraj Mat served King Taksin in many wars including the Bangkaeo Campaign and Burmese Invasion of Siam in 1775–1776. Phraya Yommaraj Mat was executed in 1779 by the orders of the king Taksin
- Wang (Thai: หวัง); the governor of Chonburi during the reigns of King Taksin and King Rama I. He was the one who brought Nguyễn Phúc Ánh to Bangkok in 1783. Wang later became Phraya Ratchawangsan the commander of the Krom Asa Cham or the Cham-Malay mercenary regiment. Wang had a daughter named Peng. Peng married Phraya Nonthaburi and bore daughter, Riam. Riam became a royal consort of King Rama II and bore sons including Prince Chetsadabodin who later became King Rama III. Chaophraya Chakri (Mud) was, therefore, a maternal great-grandfather of King Rama III through his son Phraya Ratchawangsan Wang.
- Khun Laksamana, who was captured by the Ligorian forces of Nakhon Si Thammarat in 1769.

== Ancestors ==
Ancestors of Chaophraya Chakri (Mud)

8. Sultan Sulaiman Shah of Singora
4. Tengku Hasan of Singora
2. Bunyang, Khun Laksamana
1. Mud, Chaophraya Chakri
3. Dao
