= Wat Bang Kung =

Buddhist temple in Samut Songkhram, Thailand

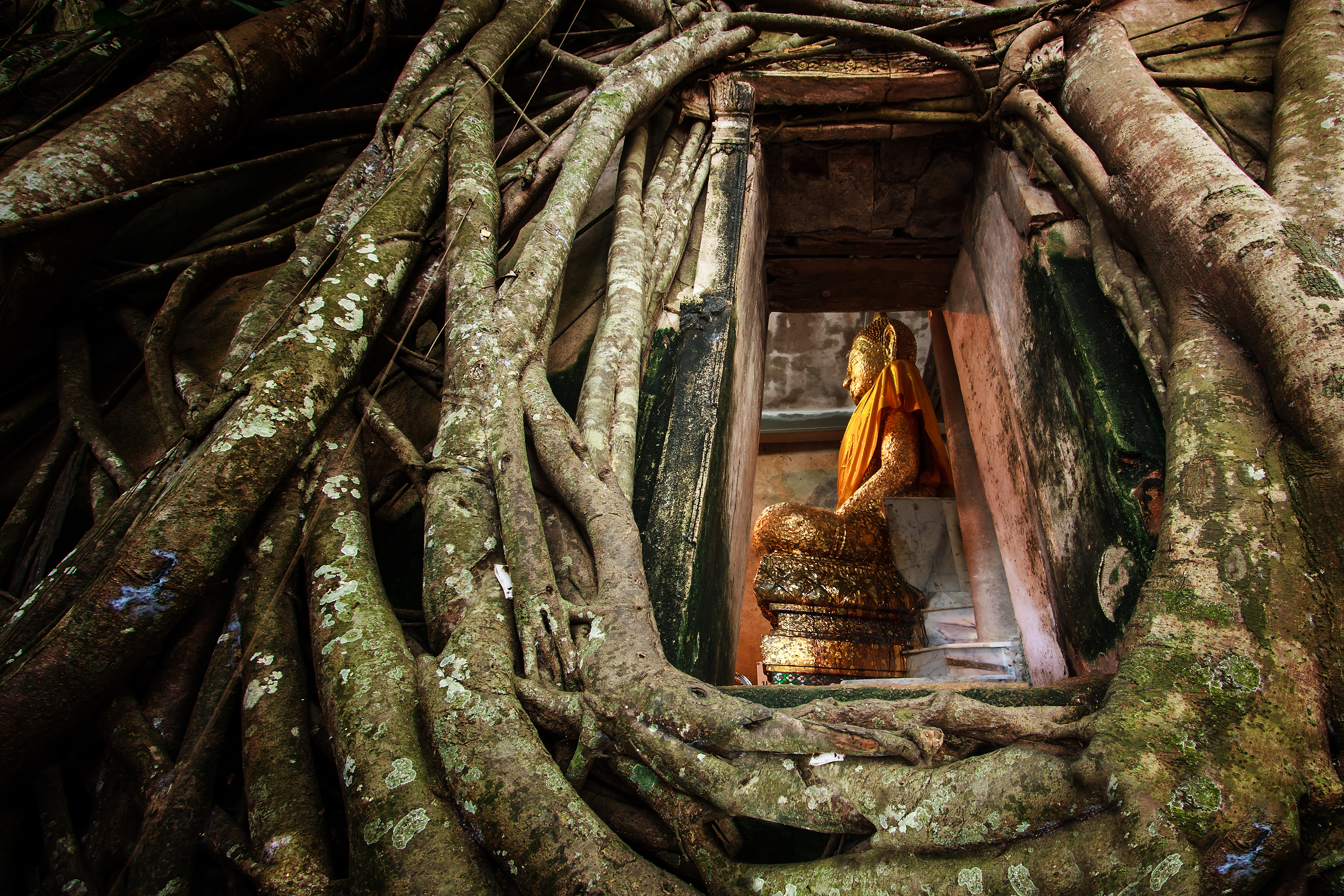

Religion
- Affiliation: Buddhism
- Status: Active

Location
- Location: Bang Kung Sub-district; Bang Khonthi District, Samut Songkhram province
- Interactive map of Wat Bang Kung
- Coordinates: 13°26′46.168″N 99°56′27.82″E

Architecture
- Style: Ayutthaya

Wat Bang Kung (Thai: วัดบางกุ้ง) is an ancient temple in Samut Songkhram, Thailand, built during the Ayutthaya period. It was the site of the Battle of Bang Kung, between the Konbaung dynasty and the Thonburi Kingdom.

== History ==
In 1765, Burmese troops attacked the Ayutthaya Kingdom. Ekkathat, king of Ayutthaya, commanded the navy and built a wall around Wat Bang Kung as an encampment for his soldiers. The Burmese troops, moving along the Mae Klong river, overran the camp, which was eventually abandoned.

In 1767, Taksin, king of Thonburi, restored the country's independence and commanded Chinese settlers from Rayong, Chonburi, Ratchaburi, and Kanchanaburi to form a guard and protect the camp, which was subsequently called Bang Kung Chinese Camp.

In 1768, Burmese troops, led by the king of Ava, ordered his army and navy to besiege the camp again. Defended by Chinese troops, it was nearly lost once more, until Taksin and Maha Sura Singhanat joined the battle and defeated the Burmese.

== Architecture ==
The temple is covered with various roots, which help support the ubosot. Inside, there is a statue of Buddha and a mural depicting the story of his life. The Fine Arts Department registered Wat Bang Kung as a national archaeological site on 18 December 1996.

== Gallery ==
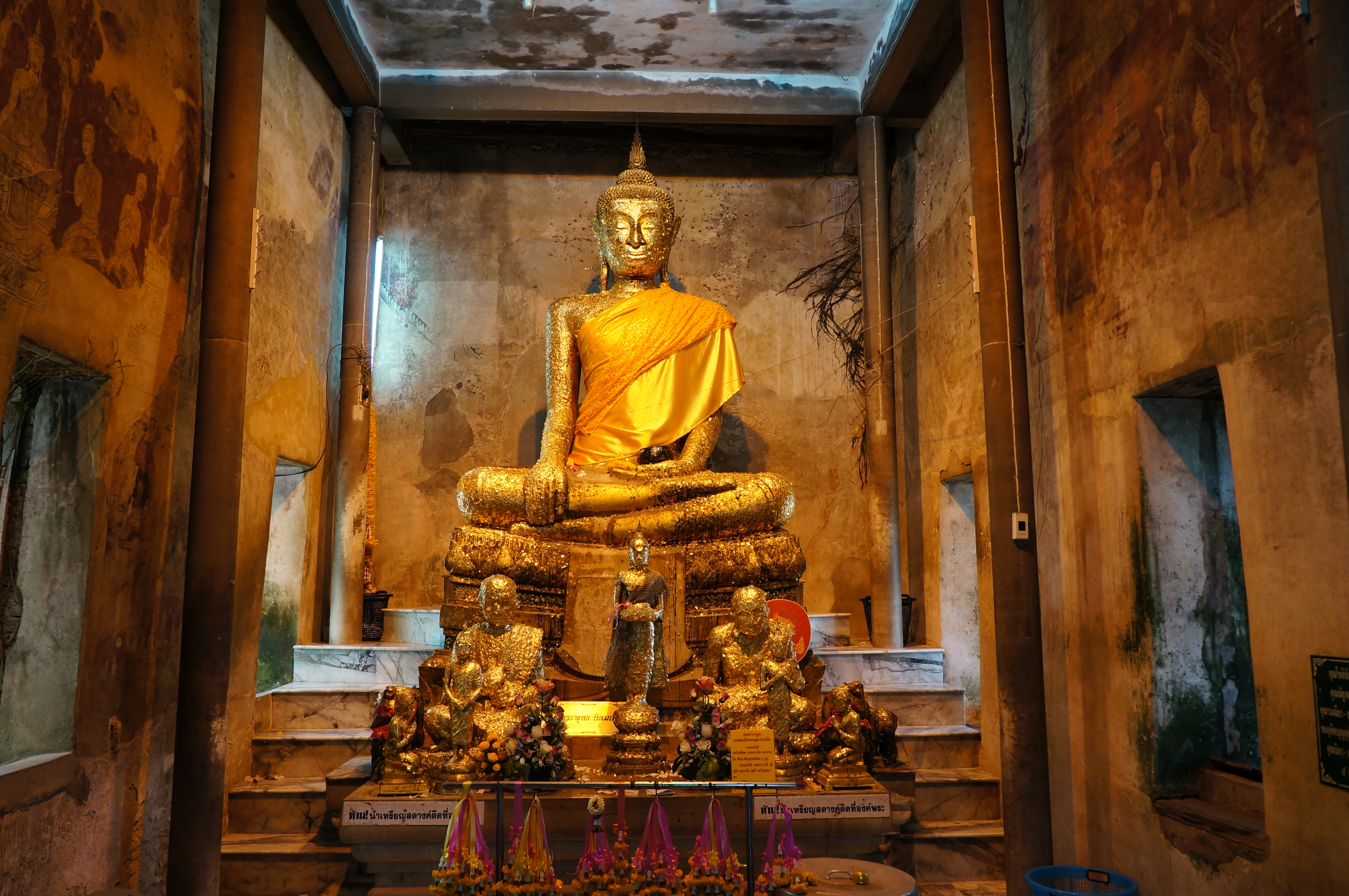
Buddha inside the ubosot

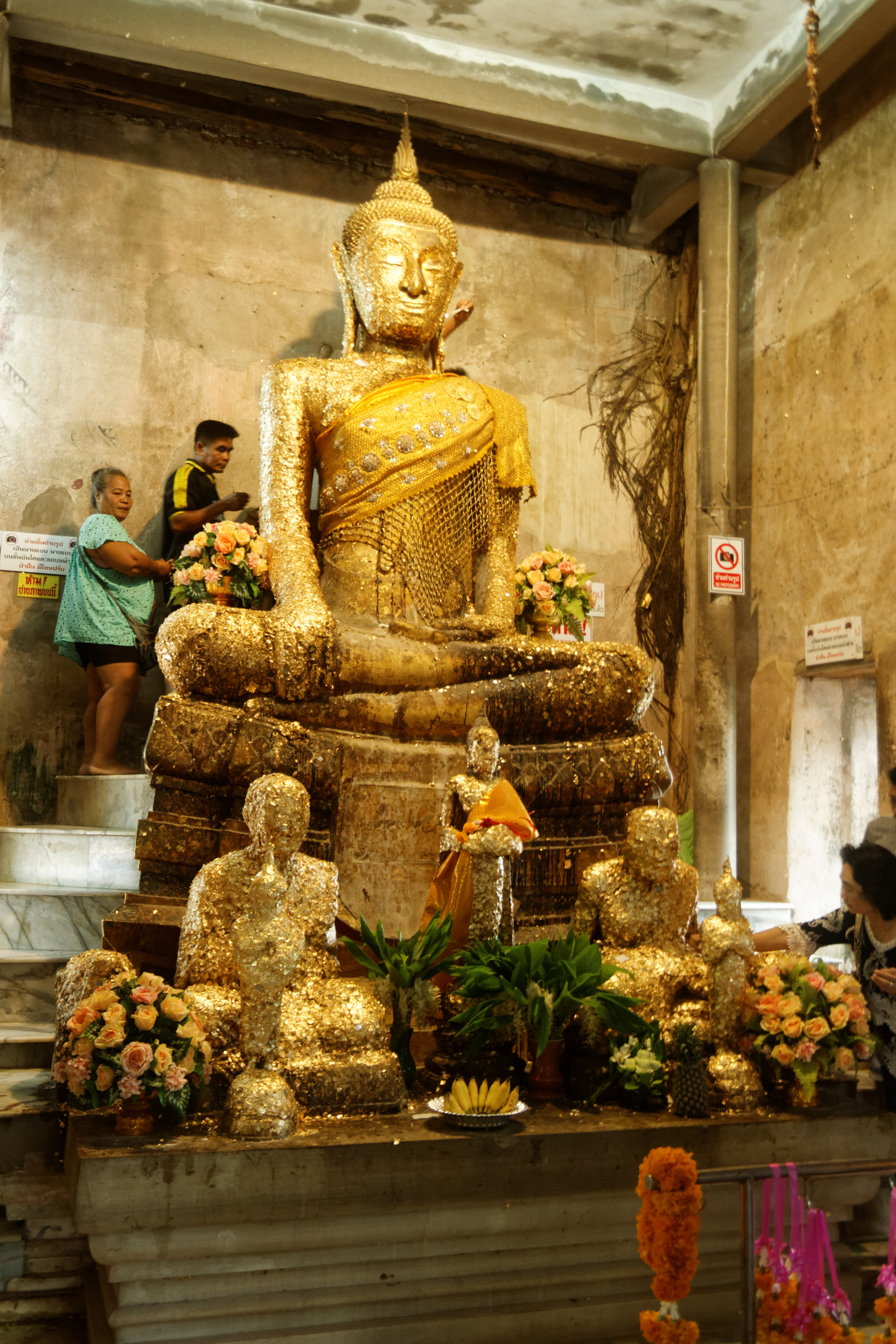

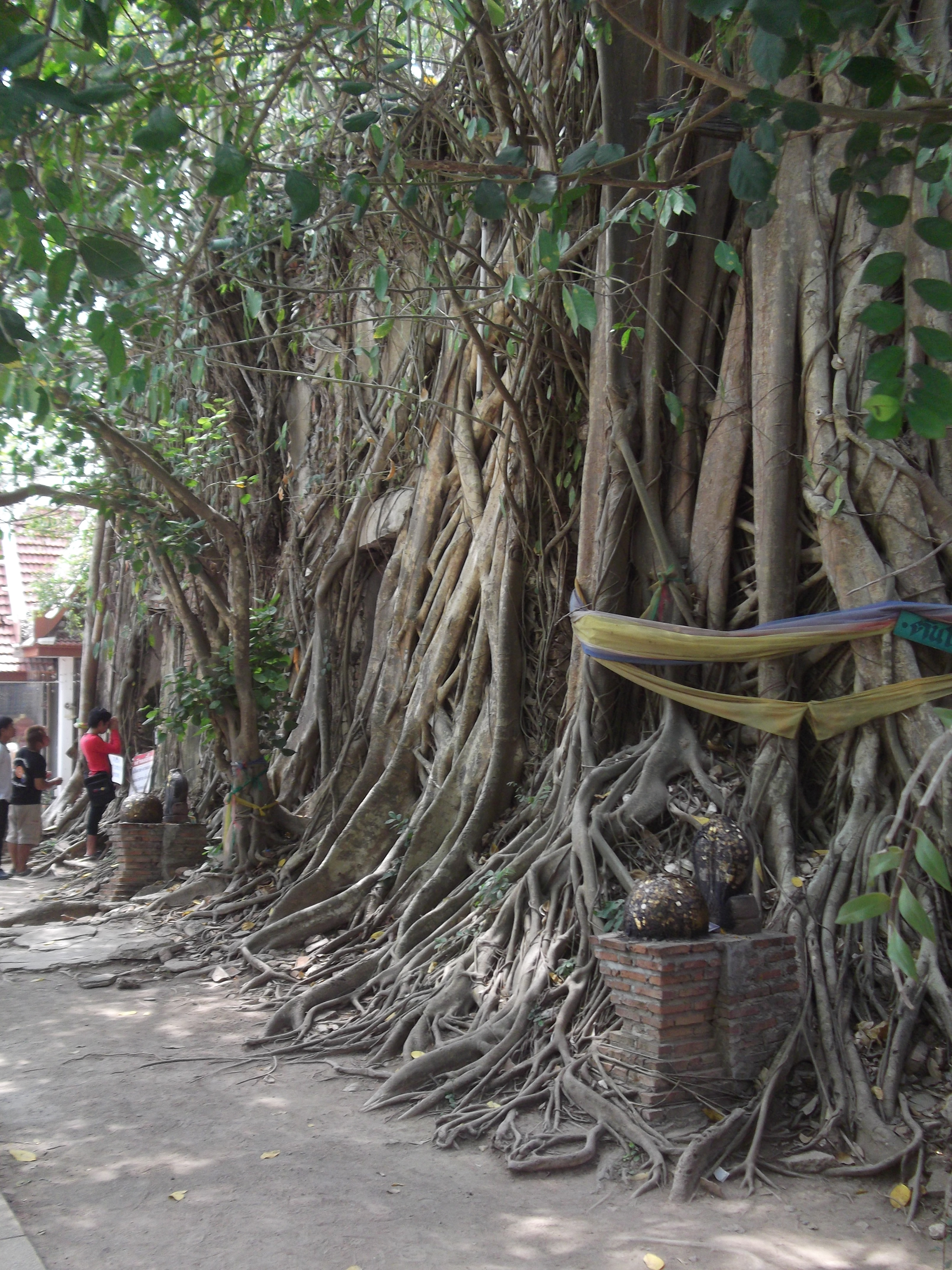
Roots encircling the ubosot

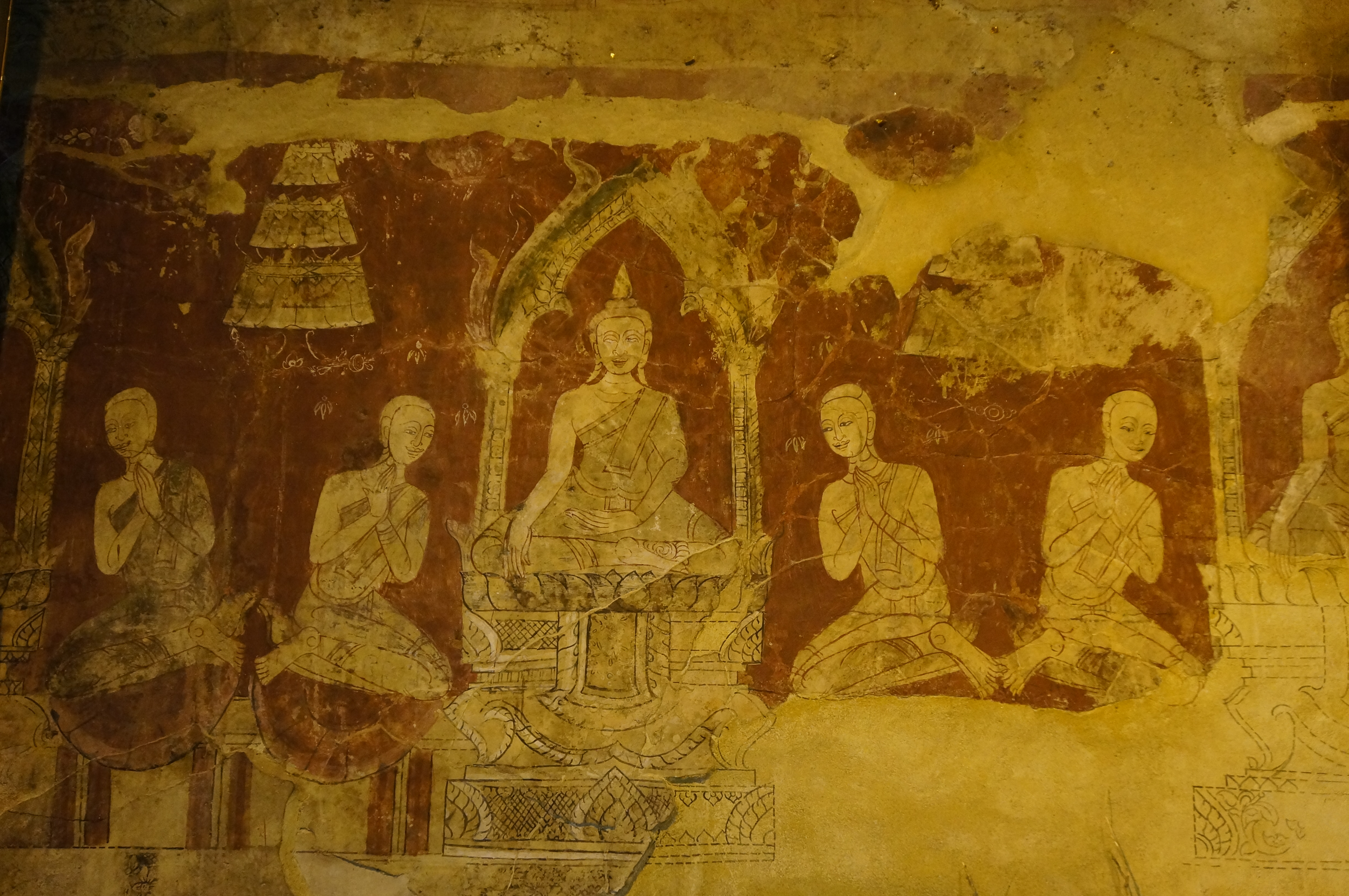
Mural inside the ubosot
