= Nguyễn Cửu Đàm =

Vietnamese general

Nguyễn Cửu Đàm (阮久潭, ? – 1777) was a Vietnamese general under the Nguyễn lords. He built the defensive wall around Saigon in 1772 to protect the newly acquired southern territories against the Siamese army.

Nguyễn also built the Kênh Ruột Ngựa (Sino-Vietnamese: Mã Trường Giang) "Horse Entrails Canal."
