= Ne Myo Thihapate =

18th-century Burmese general

- နေမျိုး သီဟပတေ့
- Born: Mu Valley, Kingdom of Myanmar
- Military career
- Allegiance: Konbaung Dynasty
- Branch: Royal Burmese Army
- Service years: 1752–1776
- Rank: General
- Conflicts: Konbaung–Hanthawaddy War (1752–1757); Burmese conquest of Luang Prabang (1765); Burmese–Siamese War (1765–1767); Burmese–Siamese War (1775–1776)
- Awards: Styled as Ne Myo Thihapate / Ne Myo Thenapati (1776).
- Other work: Minister at the Hluttaw (1776–1782?)

Ne Myo Thiha-pa-te (Burmese: နေမျိုး သီဟပတေ့; pronounced [nè mjó θìha̰pətḛ], IAST: Nemyoh Sīhapati), also spelled Nemyo Thiha-badey and Nemiao Sihabodi (Thai: เนเมียวสีหบดี), was a Burmese general in the Royal Burmese Army of the Konbaung Dynasty. He is best known for his role in the fall of the Ayutthaya Kingdom in April 1767, alongside General Maha Nawrahta.

== Career ==
=== Early military career ===
The general began his military career as one of the sixty eight elite commanders chosen by King Alaungpaya in 1752. He became one of the "most distinguished soldiers" during Alaungpaya's reunification campaigns (1752–1757).

=== Laos and Siam (1765–1767) ===
In 1764, King Hsinbyushin decided to renew the war against Siam. The king selected Thihapate and Maha Nawrahta as joint commanders to lead another invasion. Thihapate was to lead the northern invasion route from Chiang Mai while Maha Nawrahta was to lead the southern route from Martaban (Mottama). In early 1765, Thihapate with a 20,000-strong force began his operations by starting with the Lao states. The Kingdom of Vientiane agreed to become a Burmese vassal without a fight. Luang Prabang resisted but Thihapate's forces easily captured the city in March 1765, giving the Burmese complete control of Siam's entire northern border.

Thihapate then invaded Siam via the Chao Phraya valley, down towards Ayutthaya. His forces reached the outskirts of Ayutthaya on 20 January 1766, joining up with Maha Nawrahta's forces. The Burmese then began what turned out to be a 14-month siege. Around March 1767, Maha Nawrahta died of illness, and Ne Myo Thihapate became the commander-of-chief of the entire operations. His forces breached the city's defenses on 7 April 1767, and sacked the entire city.

The Burmese gains did not last long as Hsinbyushin ordered most of the Burmese troops in late 1767 to return in the face of the Chinese invasion that threatened Ava. The Siamese resistance retook their lost territories in 1768 and 1769.

=== Command at Chiang Mai (1773) ===
In early 1773, Ne Myo Thihapate was posted with a sizable army at Chiang Mai. King Hsinbyushin had wanted to renew the war with Siam but he was hamstrung by the Chinese threat up north. The Sino-Burmese war had ended with an uneasy truce in December 1769. The Chinese kept a heavy military lineup at the border in an attempt to wage another war. While at Chiang Mai, Thihapate became embroiled in the local politics. The new Burmese governor of Lan Na, Thado Mindin, mistreated many local chiefs. Ne Myo Thihapate actually sided with the chiefs. Hsinbyushin ultimately decided against opening a major front. Ne Myo Thihapate was recalled.

=== Siam (1775–1776) ===
Three of the chiefs defected to the Siamese, and came back with Siamese help to drive out the Burmese governor there in January 1775. In response, Hsinbyushin, who had long been in a state of illness that would eventually take his life, now ordered an invasion. Thihapate again was given the northern command, under the overall commander of Gen. Maha Thiha Thura. In October 1775, Thihapate led his army based in Chiang Saen down to Chiang Mai. His army captured Chiang Mai but faced tough resistance from the Siamese forces. He evacuated from Chiang Mai back to Chiang Saen when Maha Thiha Thura ordered a pullout of the invasion after Hsinbyushin's death in June 1776. The Burmese would lose control of Lan Na. However, because of his good performance in the war, he was honored with a new upgraded title Ne Myo Thenapati, and given the office of Wungyi (minister) by King Singu.
