= Siege of Ayutthaya =

1766–1767 Burmese–Siamese War siege

Siege of Ayutthaya (1766–1767)
- Part of Burmese–Siamese War (1765–1767)
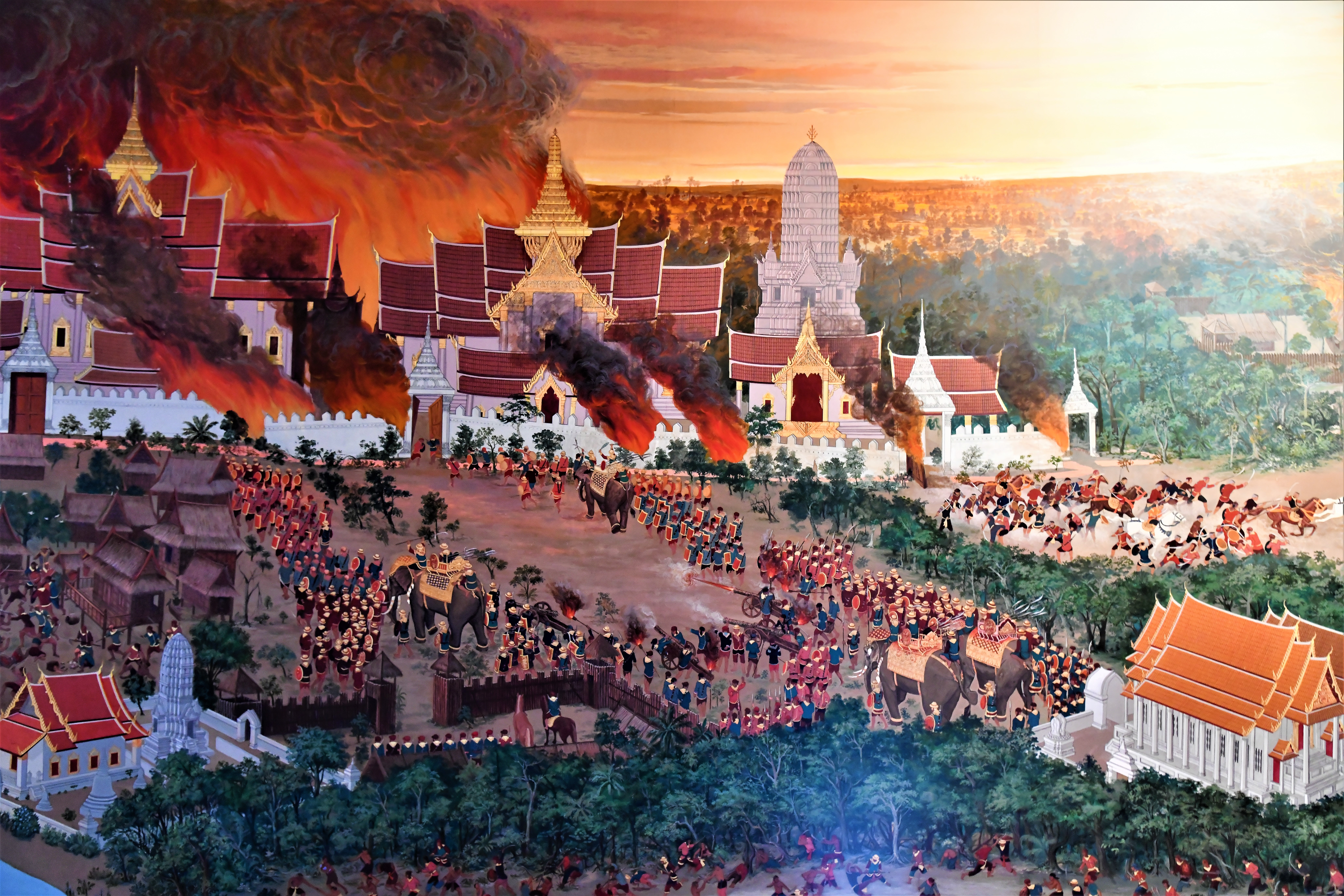
- Modern depiction of the Fall of Ayutthaya in April 1767 at the National Memorial
Date	January/February 1766 – 7 April 1767
Location	Kingdom of Ayutthaya, Ayutthaya city
Result	Burmese victory
Territorial changes	Ayutthaya conquered and occupied by the Burmese until November 1767; Fall of the Ayutthaya Kingdom; Remaining unoccupied Siamese territories descend into civil war

Belligerents
Konbaung dynasty (Burma)	Ayutthaya Kingdom (Siam)

Commanders and leaders
(Konbaung dynasty) Hsinbyushin (Konbaung dynasty) Maha Nawrahta # (Konbaung dynasty) Ne Myo Thihapate (Konbaung dynasty) Nemyo Gonnarat (Konbaung dynasty) Mingyi Kamani Sanda (Konbaung dynasty) Mingyi Zeyathu (Konbaung dynasty) Satpagyon Bo (Konbaung dynasty) Thado Mindin	Ekkathat †; Chaophraya Phrakhlang (POW); Phraya Yommaraj (POW); Phraya Phollathep (POW); Phraya Phetchaburi Rueang †; Phraya Tak

Units involved
(Konbaung dynasty) Royal Burmese Army	Royal Siamese Army; Royal Siamese Navy

Strength
40,000+	Around 20,000

Casualties and losses
unknown	up to 20,000+ killed 30,000 deported
- 200,000 Ayutthayan civilians killed and displaced by Burmese army

The siege of Ayutthaya in 1766–1767, also known as the Fall of Ayutthaya and Sack of Ayutthaya, was a part of the Burmese–Siamese War (1765–1767), in which King Hsinbyushin of the Burmese Konbaung dynasty sent his generals Maha Nawrahta and Ne Myo Thihapate to conquer the Siamese Kingdom of Ayutthaya. After conquering and subjugating Siamese peripheral cities, the two Burmese invading columns converged onto and reached the royal city of Ayutthaya in January 1766. Unable to halt Burmese advances at the frontiers, the Siamese were obliged to take defensive positions in the fortified city of Ayutthaya.

By February 1766, the Burmese laid siege to Ayutthaya and approached the city walls of Ayutthaya city in September. Ayutthaya employed traditional defense strategies by relying on the supposed impregnability of its walls and the incoming of floods during the rainy season. The Burmese, however, circumvented these strategies by persisting to stay during the rainy season and by employing the tactics of destroying the bases of the city wall of Ayutthaya. After fourteen months of enduring the siege, the centuries-old royal Siamese capital of Ayutthaya fell to the Burmese on 7 April 1767 and was completely destroyed, signifying the end of the Ayutthaya kingdom and paving the way for subsequent events in Thai history.

== Background ==
=== Burmese conquest of Siamese peripheral cities ===
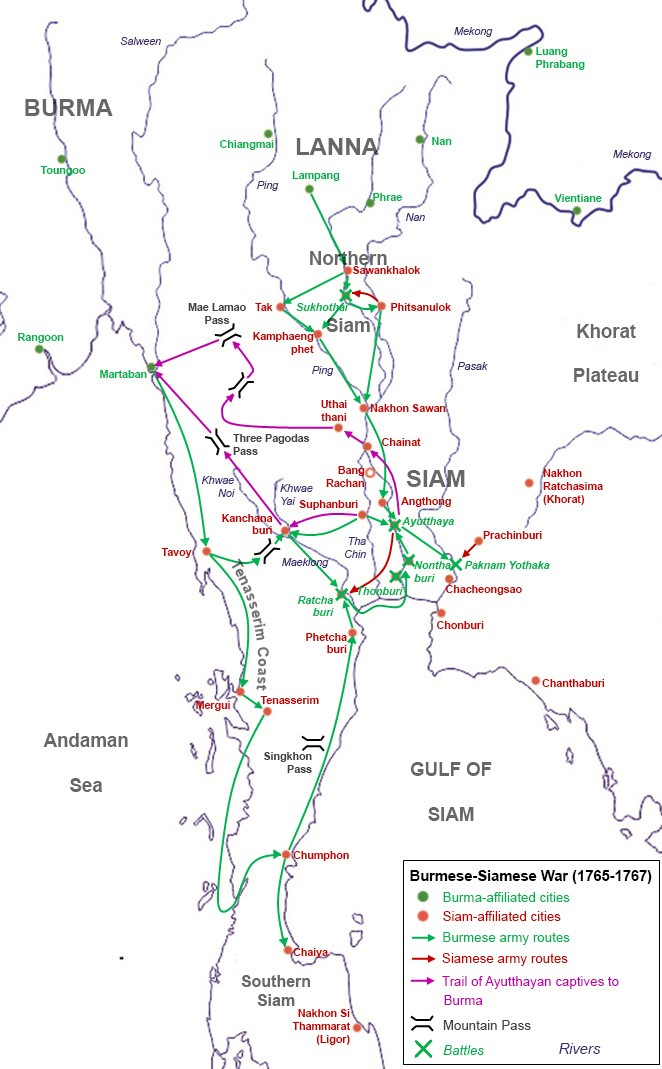
Burmese conquest of Siamese peripheral cities on the approach to Ayutthaya in 1765-1766; Green represents the Burmese army routes.

During the Burmese invasion of Siam in 1765, King Hsinbyushin had sent his armies into Siam in pincer movement attacks to converge on Ayutthaya through two routes;

- A Tavoy column under Maha Nawrahta with 20,000 men, leaving Ava in December 1764 and stationing at Tavoy on the Tenasserim coast. The Tavoy column attacked and conquered the Siamese-held Mergui and Tenasserim in January 1765. In early 1765, a vanguard portion of the Tavoy column invaded Western Siam and conquered most of the cities including Ratchaburi, Suphanburi, Phetchaburi, Kanchanaburi, Kuiburi, Pranburi and Chumphon. King Ekkathat sent Siamese royal forces in an attempt to halt the Burmese at the Western frontiers but they failed and were defeated. Western Siamese people either took refuge in the forests or went into the service of the Burmese military. Regiments of Western Siamese war captives were raised to join Burmese service under the command of Mingyi Kamani Sanda. Maha Nawrahta marched his main armies from Tavoy crossing the Myitta Pass in November 1765 to station in Kanchanaburi. Maha Nawrahta then sent his forces to conquer Thonburi and Nonthaburi at the lower reaches of Chao Phraya River – the gateways of Ayutthaya to the sea. In the Battle of Nonthaburi in December 1765, a fierce battle ensued as the British merchant William Powney, in his assistance of Siam, inflicted heavy cannon fires on the Burmese at Nonthaburi. The Burmese at Nonthaburi retreated but when Siamese forces entered Nonthaburi unsuspectingly, the Burmese, in turn, ambushed and routed the attackers. After the Burmese victory at Nonthaburi, from Kanchanaburi, Maha Nawrahta divided his armies into two routes;
  - Maha Nawrahta himself would march his land armies to approach Ayutthaya in the west.
  - Mingyi Kamani Sanda, the naval commander, would sail his riparian fleet upstream the Chao Phraya River to approach Ayutthaya from the south.
- Hsinbyushin sent Ne Myo Thihapate, whose mother was a Lao-Lanna woman according to Thai chronicles, to lead Burmese armies of 20,000 men to subjugate the rebellious Lanna in February 1764. Nemyo Thihapate pacified the Lanna rebels against Burma and continued to attack and conquer the Lao Kingdom of Luang Phrabang in early 1765. The subjugation of Lanna and Laos added a large number of manpower to Burmese ranks and resources to the Burmese granary. This became the Lanna Chiang Mai regiment under the command of Nemyo Thihapate. Combined with new Lanna-Lao recruits, Nemyo Thihapate possessed up to 43,000 men in his armies. Ne Myo Thihapate left Lanna to descend on Northern Siam in mid-1765. The Northern Siamese cities of Phitsanulok, Sukhothai, Sawankhalok, Kamphaeng Phet, Tak, Nakhon Sawan and Ang Thong all fell to Burmese conquests in succession. Regiments of surrendered Northern Siamese people were raised to join the Burmese ranks.

=== Battle of the outskirts ===
The Burmese approached Ayutthaya from three directions;

- Maha Nawrahta and his Burmese Tavoy contingent approached Ayutthaya from the west through Suphanburi, stationing at Siguk (modern Bang Ban, Ayutthaya) around ten kilometers to the west of Ayutthaya.
- Nemyo Thihapate and his Burmese-Lanna armies approached Ayutthaya from the north, stationing at Paknam Prasop (modern Bang Pahan) about seven kilometers to the north of Ayutthaya.
- Mingyi Kamani Sanda and his Burmese fleet sailed upstream on the Chao Phraya to approach Ayutthaya from the south, settling in Bangsai (modern Bang Pa-in) to the south of Ayutthaya.

King Ekkathat sent Siamese armies to the north and the west in attempts to prevent the Burmese from taking position in the outskirts of Ayutthaya. Maha Nawrahta met with the Siamese commander Phraya Phollathep at Siguk in early 1766, leading to the Battle of Siguk. Maha Nawrahta ultimately prevailed and the Siamese retreated. At the northern front, Ekkathat sent Chaophraya Phrakhlang, the Siamese Prime Minister, to lead an army of 10,000 men to halt Nemyo Thihapate. In January 1766, Nemyo Thihapate met Phrakhlang at about two and a quarter miles to the northwest of Paknam Prasop, where Thihapate inflicted a humiliating defeat on the Siamese under Phrakhlang. Nemyo Thihapate reached the outskirts of Ayutthaya on 20 January 1766 (5th waxing of Tabodwe 1127 ME). In late January 1766, Ekkathat sent another army under Phraya Phetchaburi Rueang and Phraya Tak (future King Taksin) to dislodge Maha Nawrahta at Siguk. Maha Nawrahta sent his commanders Nemyo Gonnarat and Mingyi Zeyathu to meet the Siamese at Wat Phukhaothong temple, which was built by the Burmese king Bayinnaung two centuries earlier, to the northwest of Ayutthaya, leading to the Battle of Wat Phukhaothong. The Burmese were nearly routed but managed to catch up and turn the tide of the battle. The Siamese were again defeated and retreated into the fortified city of Ayutthaya.

== Siamese preparations ==
=== Siamese defensive strategy ===
Manpower control inefficiencies crippled the Siamese defense capabilities. Effective manpower mobilization and strong military leadership of the times of King Naresuan in the late sixteenth century were not used. Peripheral governors had been deprived of their military prowess thus they were prone to rebellions. When the Burmese invaded again in 1765, King Ekkathat sent Siamese forces to halt the Burmese advances at the frontiers but to no avail, they were all defeated. Siamese commanders were inexperienced and lacking in strategies compared to their war-hardened Burmese counterparts. Ayutthaya did not care to hold outlying cities against the Burmese. The Siamese court recruited and called forces from the peripheral cities, including their governors, to defend Ayutthaya city. This left the periphery even less defended as western and northern Siamese towns fell prey to Burmese conquests in rapid succession.

With the Burmese victories at Paknam Prasop and Wat Phukhaothong in January 1766, they were able to set foot on the Ayutthayan outskirts to lay siege to the Siamese royal city by February. Defeated many times, Siam had no choice but to resort to traditional defensive strategies. Siam evacuated all people from the suburbs into the city, shut the city gates tight and put up defenses. This strategy relied on the supposed impregnability of Ayutthaya's city walls and the arrival of the Siamese wet season.

=== Ayutthaya City Walls ===
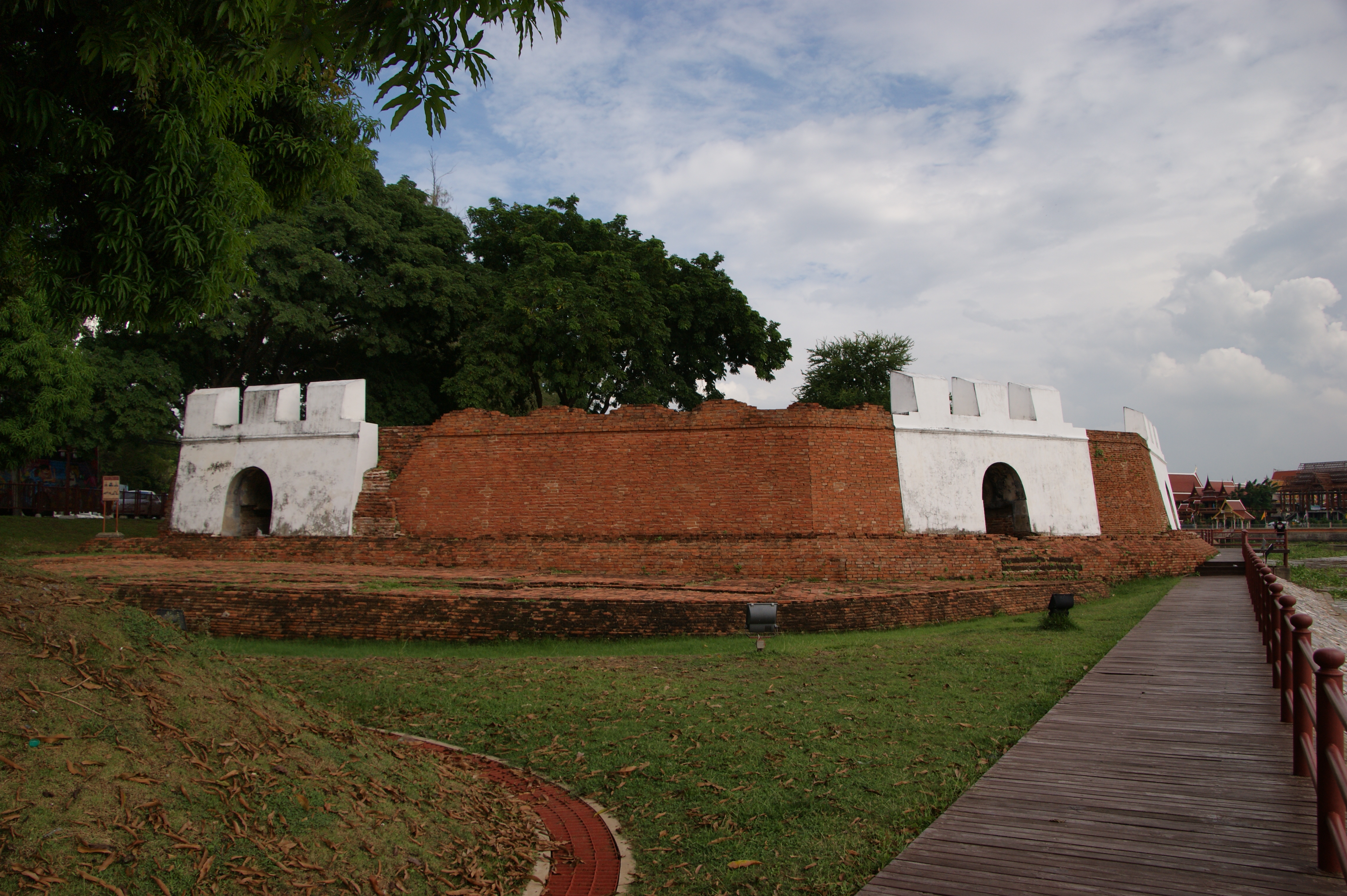
Pomphet Fort, built in 1550, had been the largest and most important fortress on the southern side of Ayutthaya. The current hexagonal design is attributed to French architect La Mare in 1685. Large parts of Pomphet fort were dismantled in 1782 for the construction of Bangkok.

The Ayutthaya city is situated on an island at the confluence of three rivers – namely Chao Phraya, Lopburi and Pasak, surrounded by the waters serving as a natural city moat. The first wall erected at the foundation of Ayutthaya in 1350 was a simple earthen wall. With the inception of the Burmese–Siamese wars, King Maha Chakkraphat built new walls from brick and stones to replace the old earthen wall in 1550. Maha Chakkraphat also constructed two main forts of Pomphet and Satkop. King Maha Thammaracha expanded the city walls to fully reach the eastern riverbanks in 1580. The Ayutthayan city walls had stood against Burmese attacks in 1564, 1569, 1587, 1760 and two Cambodian attacks in 1570 and 1578. The walls then stood for two centuries with limited usage and several renovations. Western engineers contributed to a more sturdy, reinforced style of the wall. After 1586, no invaders had reached Ayutthaya city for nearly two hundred years until 1760.

The Ayutthaya city walls stood three wa and two sok (seven meters) in height with two wa (about four meters) in thickness. It had up to sixty regular city gates with about twenty large tunnel gates that allowed large groups of people or domesticated animals to pass. It also had water gates that facilitated transport by boat. The gates were decorated with flared crosspieces at the top similar to the Giant Swing in modern Bangkok and were designed to impress rather than to keep enemies out. There were sixteen surrounding forts embedded into the walls. The three most important fortresses of Ayutthaya located at strategic centers were;

- Pomphet Fort or Diamond Fort, located at the confluence of Chao Phraya and Pasak rivers at the southeastern corner of Ayutthaya city, constructed in 1550, was the most important defense fort on the southern side of Ayutthaya city wall. It was the point where all foreign ships, according to Siamese law, were unloaded and inspected. All ships passing into Ayutthaya city had to go through this point.
- Mahachai Fort, located at the junction of the Lopburi and Pasak rivers at the northeastern corner, constructed in 1580, protected against invaders coming from the east.
- Satkop Fort, located at the interception of Chao Phraya and Lopburi rivers at the northwestern corner, protected against invaders from the west.

=== Siamese armory ===
Ayutthaya had plenty of firearms and cannons. Siam had learned the production of matchlock firearms and bronze cannons from the Portuguese in the sixteenth century. Siam had domestic furnaces for cannon casting and became a renowned manufacturer of cannons. Two cannons gifted by King Narai to King Louis XIV of France in 1686 ended up being used by French revolutionaries during the storming of Bastille in 1789. However, both Burma and Siam were unable to produce their own flintlock muskets – a new technology that had to be exclusively imported from the Europeans. Siam used their wealth to acquire several thousand muskets and artillery guns. The Siamese government purchased a large number of Western-produced, cast-iron, larger-caliber cannons known in Thai as "Bariam" (from Malay Meriam). Individual cannons were religiously worshipped by the Siamese for they believed supernatural protector spirits resided in those cannons. Siam also utilized small-caliber breechloader cannons that were employed in hundreds on the battlefield and could also be mounted on elephants or ships.

Even though Ayutthaya possessed a large number of firearms, during the Burmese invasion of 1765–1767, they were not utilized to their full potential. A long hiatus from warfare meant few Siamese were skilled in effectively operating these firearms. Thai chronicles reveal that Siamese cannoneers mishandled their own cannons, missing the targets. Some cannons were left out of maintenance and became non-functional during wartime. Meanwhile, the Burmese put emphasis on marksmanship training to inflict the greatest damage to their enemies. In 1759, King Alaungpaya issued a royal decree instructing his musketeers on how to properly use flintlock firearms. It is estimated that sixty percent of Burmese military personnel operated flintlock muskets.

=== Wet rainy season ===
In pre-modern times, Burmese–Siamese wars were conducted in the dry season between January and August of each year. The rainy season arrived in May and the waters began to rise in September, when downflowing water from northern regions combined in the central river plain. The island with the city of Ayutthaya itself was situated on high grounds and not susceptible to the seasonal floods. However, the outlying areas of Ayutthaya became inundated and turned into a vast sea of flood water during the wet season. The water level peaked in November. Any invaders were obliged to leave Ayutthaya at the advent of the flood season as high water levels would cripple any battle. Military personnel would could not camp in flood zones and provisions would be damaged. Flooded swamps also bore diseases.

None of the earlier Burmese invaders had remained during the notorious Siamese flood season. Even the great Burmese king Bayinnaung abandoned his conquest of Ayutthaya at the arrival of the wet season in 1569. King Ekkathat reasoned that the Burmese would eventually retreat at the end of dry season. However, the Burmese had other plans and did not intend to leave. King Hsinbyushin had planned his campaign to conquer Siam to possibly span many years, and was not deterred by the rainy season.

== Siege ==
=== Early Siege (February–September 1766) ===
In February 1766, the Burmese invading armies laid siege to Ayutthaya with the two grand commanders Maha Nawrahta and Nemyo Thihapate encamping to the west and the north of Ayutthaya, respectively;

- Maha Nawrahta, with his Burmese Tavoy column of more than 20,000 men and his subordinate commanders including Nemyo Gonnarat, Mingyi Zeyathu and Mingyi Kamani Sanda, stationed at Siguk about ten kilometers to the west of Ayutthaya.
- Nemyo Thihapate, with his Burmese-Lanna column of 20,000 men, headquartered at Paknam Prasop about seven kilometers to the north of Ayutthaya.

The Siamese inside of Ayutthaya, however, fared quite well during this initial stage of the siege. Food supply was plentiful inside the city, as a French missionary observed that "the provisions of the capital were not yet exhausted, the beggars alone suffered from hunger and some died of it". Life went on as usual inside the Ayutthaya citadel. The Burmese blockade of Ayutthaya was strong on the western and northern sides of Ayutthaya, but was less effective on the eastern side, since it would later be shown that Ayutthaya was still able to communicate with the outskirts through the eastern perimeters. No major battles occurred in Ayutthaya during this period.

==== Burmese encirclement (September 1766) ====
In September 1766, the Burmese forces, along with grand commanders Maha Nawrahta and Nemyo Thihapate, approached the Ayutthaya city walls to encircle the city;

- Western Front: Maha Nawrahta moved from Siguk to the Wat Phukhaothong temple, whose pagoda was built by the Burmese king Bayinnaung two centuries earlier, with his vanguard at Wat Thakarong temple just 500 meters from the Ayutthayan walls.
- Northern Front: Nemyo Thihapate moved from Paknam Prasop down to Phosamton, about five kilometers north of Ayutthaya. Phosamton was a site of the Mon refugee community. The Burmese enslaved the local Mon population in Phosamton, took their food supply and marshaled them into the Burmese armies.

Burmese armies reached the Ayutthayan city walls on 14 September 1766. Ayutthaya sent forces to attack the Burmese at Wat Thakarong to prevent them from encamping but was again defeated. The Burmese had come within range of Siamese cannons. Thus the Siamese made an attempt to fire cannons from the Siamese Satkop fort in the northwestern corner of the city at the Burmese riverine fleet at Wat Thakarong to the west. Siamese cannon shots scored a direct hit, killing several men on two Burmese boats but the cannon itself broke and became unusable.

By September 1766, the Siamese defenders realized the Burmese would not leave. The Burmese commanders proposed to Maha Nawrahta to move to high grounds. However, Maha Nawrahta stated that Ayutthaya was then like a fish caught in the net. Abandoning the siege would allow Ayutthaya to seek supplies and reinforcements that would delay the Burmese conquest of Ayutthaya. Maha Nawrahta then ordered that;

- Any remaining food supplies and bullocks in the vicinity of Ayutthaya to be seized
- Rice to be cultivated in the paddy fields in Ayutthaya suburbs to produce food
- Horses and elephants to be moved to high grounds where they would feed on grass
- Shelters and supply sheds to be built at shallow, less-inundated areas
- Boats for transportation, some were painted red or gilded, to be constructed

==== Battle of Wat Sangkhawat (November 1766) ====
In November 1766, the flood waters surrounding Ayutthaya were at their peak. Both the Burmese and the Siamese could only travel by boats. King Ekkathat sent his two commanders Phraya Phetchaburi Rueang and Phraya Tak to take position at Wat Yai Chaimongkhon temple to the southeast off the city walls with ten thousands of men. The Burmese fleet from Bangsai to the south of Ayutthaya approached the city walls. Phraya Phetchaburi and Phraya Tak sailed their fleet to meet the Burmese fleet near Wat Sangkhawat temple about two kilometers to the southeast of the wall, leading to the Battle of Wat Sangkhawat in November 1766. A fierce battle ensued as both the Burmese and the Siamese jumped onto each other's boats to engage in hand-to-hand combat. Phraya Phetchaburi approached the Burmese at the vanguard but he was soon surrounded by twenty Burmese boats. The Burmese threw a gunpower keg at Phraya Phetchaburi's boat. The explosion killed many Siamese men but Phraya Phetchaburi survived. A Burmese gunman named Nga San Tun rowed his boat to capture Phraya Phetchaburi. Phraya Phetchaburi jumped onto Nga San Tun's boat, preparing to slash the Burmese gunmen with his sword. Nga San Tun took quick action by hitting Phraya Phetchaburi with a ramrod. Thai chronicles stated that Phraya Phetchaburi was brought down dead by a musket shot but Burmese chronicles said otherwise that Phraya Phetchaburi, known as Bra Than, was captured alive. With their leader supposedly dead, the Siamese panicked and retreated. Phraya Tak, however, was idle for most of the battle and did not engage to rescue his comrade Phraya Phetchaburi.

The Burmese prevailed and captured ten thousands of Siamese captives. General Maha Nawrahta generously provided the Siamese captives with food and shelter and encouraged those Siamese who had fled into hiding in the jungles to peacefully return. Thai sources, however, portrayed that the Burmese violently pursued Siamese war refugees to capture them. Surrendered Siamese men were made to swear loyalty to Burma and enter Burmese military service, adding even more men to the Burmese ranks. After his defeat, Phraya Tak chose not to return to the Ayutthaya citadel and instead stationed his troops at the Wat Phichaisongkhram temple on the eastern wall across the city moat.

==== Battle of Phosamton (November 1766) ====
Nemyo Thihapate had taken his position at Phosamton to the north of Ayutthaya. Phosamton was a site of the Mon refugee community in Siam. During this Burmese invasion, the local Mon population were recruited into the service of the Burmese. A number of Mon refugees in Siam collaborated with the Burmese invaders as the Mons served as translators between the Burmese and the Siamese. In November 1766, ten days after the Siamese defeat at Wat Sangkhawat, King Ekkathat sent another force to attack Nemyo Thihapate to the north. Upon learning of the Siamese advance, Nemyo Thihapate arranged his defensive positions. Two regiments with 5,000 men each were placed on both banks of the Lopburi river at Uyin village (believed to be Phosamton), waiting to ambush. Nemyo Thihapate sent another 10,000 men to lure the Siamese fleet into his trap.

The Siamese fleet, with ten thousands of men, left Ayutthaya and proceeded to the north, meeting with the Burmese decoy fleet at Phaniat only a kilometer to the north of Ayutthaya where the elephant khedda stood. The Burmese vanguard then feigned retreat, luring the Siamese into Phosamton. Unaware of the ambush plan, the Siamese fleet sailed directly into the Burmese trap. The Siamese fleet was annihilated by the ambush of Burmese forces from both river banks at the set up point with the Burmese capturing a large number of Siamese men.

By November 1766, after the two devastating defeats at Wat Sangkhawat and Phosamton, according to Burmese chronicles, both the Siamese court and populace trembled in fear and anxiety as they realized their situation had become dire. The Siamese decided to permanently shut the Ayutthaya city gates by completely sealing the gates with bricks, the only way to pass through was to climb across the wall using ropes.

=== Another Siamese attempt to repel the Burmese (December 1766) ===
In December 1766, when the floodwaters on the Ayutthayan outskirts began to recede, Ayutthaya made another attempt to dislodge the Burmese in the west and the north by sending two armies, each with ten thousands of men;

- Phraya Tak was sent to attack Maha Nawrahta's contingent at Wat Thakarong to the northwest of Ayutthaya.
- Phraya Phra Narit was sent to attack Nemyo Thihapate at Phosamton.

Both Maha Nawrahta and Nemyo Thihapate mustered their forces of 12,000 men, 120 elephants and 1,200 horses to deal with the Siamese offensives. The Burmese eventually prevailed as before. At any rate, the Siamese attempts to break the siege were unsuccessful.

By December 1766, Siamese manpower had been depleted and Ayutthaya could only send some thousands of men into the battlefield. Ayutthaya also began to enlist foreigners to fight the Burmese. King Ekkathat put out another Siamese attempt to repel the Burmese by placing a regiment of 2,000 men at Wat Chaiwatthanaram temple to the southwest of Ayutthaya and 2,000 Chinese men under the leadership of Luang Aphaiphiphat the Chinese headman at Khlong Suan Phlu to the southeast of Ayutthaya. Aphaiphiphat barricaded his Chinese contingent at the abandoned Dutch trade factory, as the Dutch had earlier abandoned their factory in the face of the Burmese invasion in October 1765, leaving behind a large quantity of trade cargo.

According to Thai chronicles, Mangchai the Lanna ruler of Phrae, who was leading his Lanna Phrae regiment under the command of Nemyo Thihapate, mutinied against the Burmese and left the battlefield with his men eastward to the Wat Phra Phutthabat temple in Saraburi. Mangchai sent a letter via Phraya Yommaraj, the Siamese commander, saying that he did not want to serve Burma anymore. The Burmese chased after the Lanna defectors to Saraburi, meeting them at Wat Phra Phutthabat and a battle ensued.

==== Departure of Phraya Tak ====
Phraya Tak was a Siamese nobleman of Teochew Chinese immigrant background with the personal name Zheng Xin (鄭新). By the end of 1766, the situation had become desperate for the Siamese. The Siamese had depleted their food and manpower as resistance against the Burmese invaders became increasingly futile. A large number of desperate Ayutthayan people surrendered to the besieging Burmese, who promised them fair treatment. According to popular belief, Phraya Tak was put on judicial trial for his unauthorized cannon fire. Phraya Tak was also blamed for the fall of his fellow commander Phraya Phetchaburi in the battle of Wat Sangkhawat in November 1766. These events disheartened Phraya Tak, who became convinced that the fall of Ayutthaya was inevitable. After his defeat at Wat Sangkhawat, Phraya Tak did not return to the Ayutthaya citadel but rather stationed his troops at Wat Phichaisongkhram temple to the east of Ayutthaya.

Burmese actions on the eastern facet of Ayutthaya were less intensive than other sides. At the end of 1766, Phraya Tak gathered his Chinese-Siamese followers of 500 men at Wat Phichaisongkhram temple. On 4 January 1767, Phraya Tak and his followers broke through the relatively less-manned Burmese encirclement to the east to seek out a new position in Eastern Siam. On that same night, a great fire broke out inside the Ayutthaya citadel, burning about 10,000 houses.

=== Escalation (January 1767) ===
During the Burmese invasion of Siam in 1765–1767, Burma also faced incoming war from another front – Qing China (see the Sino-Burmese War). In 1765, the Burmese forces from the Shan State of Kengtung invaded Tai Lue Sipsongpanna, which had been under Chinese suzerainty. Liu Zao (劉藻), the viceroy of Yungui, committed the Qing Green Banner Army to attack Kengtung in 1765, which was repelled by the Burmese commander Nemyo Sithu. The disgraced viceroy Liu Zao committed suicide. Yang Yingju (楊應琚), the new viceroy of Yungui, initiated a new war with Burma. Yang Yingju attacked and occupied Kengtung in May 1766. Yang Yingju sent Chinese armies through the Tiebi Pass (鐵壁) in October 1766 to directly attack the Burmese heartlands in the Irrawaddy valley. The Chinese invaders attacked and occupied the Shan state of Bhamo but Balamindin took defensive position in his stockade at Kaungton to the south of Bhamo. The Chinese suffered from tropical climate and malaria disease. Balamindin held the Chinese out until December 1766 when the Burmese general Nemyo Sithu expelled the Chinese from Bhamo. The Chinese retreated and were followed by the Burmese into their territory.

Burma then faced war on two fronts; China and Siam. The Burmese court began to consider finishing the Siamese war in order to shift military activity to the Chinese front. King Hsinbyushin gave orders in January 1767 urging the Burmese commanders to finish the conquest of Siam. Maha Nawrahta then stated that Ayutthaya, in spite of many defeats, still persisted, so efforts should be escalated in order to finish the conquest of Ayutthaya. Maha Nawrahta also proposed the tactics of digging an underground tunnel into Ayutthaya, taking the model from the Theravadin Mahosadha Jataka, in which Mahosadha had dug a tunnel into the city of Pancala to take the family members of Culani, the king of Pancala, including his beautiful daughter Pancala Candi, hostage. Nemyo Thihapate moved from Phosamton to Phaniat, where the elephant khedda stood, just at the northern wall of Ayutthaya. Nemyo Thihapate burnt down the Siamese Kotcha Pravet royal palace at Phaniat and constructed a tower there. The Burmese dismantled bricks from many Siamese temples in the Ayutthaya suburbs to construct twenty-seven battle towers surrounding Ayutthaya with the height of seven taung (approximately three meters, see Myanmar units of measurement) and the circumferences ranging from 150 tas to 300 tas. The Burmese towers allowed them to lift cannons to fire into Ayutthaya, inflicting damage on the city.

==== Battle of Khlong Suan Phlu (February 1767) ====
The Siamese court had enlisted the local Chinese and Portuguese to defend the city. The Portuguese community at Ban Portuket, about 1.5 kilometer downstream to the south of Ayutthaya, had been left isolated since November 1766 when the Burmese closed in. On 13 November 1766, the Burmese attacked Saint Joseph Church but were repelled by Catholic defenders. "They sabred a crowd of Burmese who had attempted to storm the college."

By February 1767, the Chinese stockade at Khlong Suan Phlu and the Portuguese camps at Ban Portuket were the main Siamese defense line to the south. The Chinese at Khlong Suan Phlu sailed their junk fleet against the Burmese towers to the south along the Chao Phraya River, coming between the towers of Mingyi Zeyathu and Nanda Udein Kyawdin, leading to the Battle of Khlong Suan Phlu. However, the Burmese had laid an iron chain across the river to prevent their passage. Chinese–Siamese war-junks were halted by the iron chains and those large ships crowded at the point. The two Burmese commanders then poured cannon fire from their towers onto the stuck Chinese–Siamese fleet, destroying and annihilating it. Burmese forces from nearby towers arrived to finish the battle. Many Chinese and Siamese were killed and drowned in this battle.

=== Negotiation and Death of Maha Nawrahta ===
The situation inside of the Ayutthaya citadel was at the worst. Starving people died or left. Robbery and chaos dominated the once-prosperous Siamese royal capital. In February 1767, the Siamese took out an old cannon named Dvaravati, which was believed to be spiritual guardian of the Ayutthaya city, to be employed at the front to fire at Nemyo Thihapate's position to the north. However, the Dvaravati cannon failed miserably and did not function, partly due to lack of experience of Siamese cannoneers. The first shot fell short of the city moat, not reaching the target. The second shot went too far, missing the target. Ayutthaya defenders then interpreted this as an omen suggesting that the guardian spirits of Ayutthaya did not even comply in the defense of the city, while Burmese cannons, stationed on high battle towers, effectively inflicted fire on Ayutthaya, destroying buildings and killing people. King Ekkathat and the Siamese court then resolved to sue for peace. Phraya Kalahom, the Minister of Military, was sent out to meet Maha Nawrahta on the western outskirts. Burmese chronicles stated that Siam offered to send tributes but was denied by the Burmese leading commanders who demanded total and unconditional surrender. The Burmese–Siamese peace negotiation attempt apparently failed.

Five days after the negotiation, Maha Nawrahta the supreme commander of the Burmese Tavoy column died from illness. Maha Nawrahta was believed to be cremated and his remains were interred at the Wat Siguk temple to the west of Ayutthaya. According to Thai chronicles, the Burmese commanders of the Tavoy column initially voted to elect Mingyi Kamani Sanda as their new commander but Nemyo Thihapate exerted his command over Maha Nawrahta's armies. Thihapate reported the death of Maha Nawrahta to the Burmese king Hsinbyushin at Ava and asked to assume the commands of all the besieging Burmese armies in Ayutthaya. Hsinbyushin, however, appointed Minye Minhla Uzana, the governor of Martaban, to replace Maha Nawrahta instead. This new regiment left Ava on 18 February 1767 (5th waning of Tabodwe 1128 ME). It took a considerable time for Minye Minhla Uzana to lead his armies to Ayutthaya so Nemyo Thihapate became the de facto supreme commander of all the Burmese in Ayutthaya. According to Prince Damrong, the death of Maha Nawrahta was detrimental to the Siamese as it allowed the Burmese forces to be united under the single command of Nemyo Thihapate.

=== Final Battles (March 1767) ===
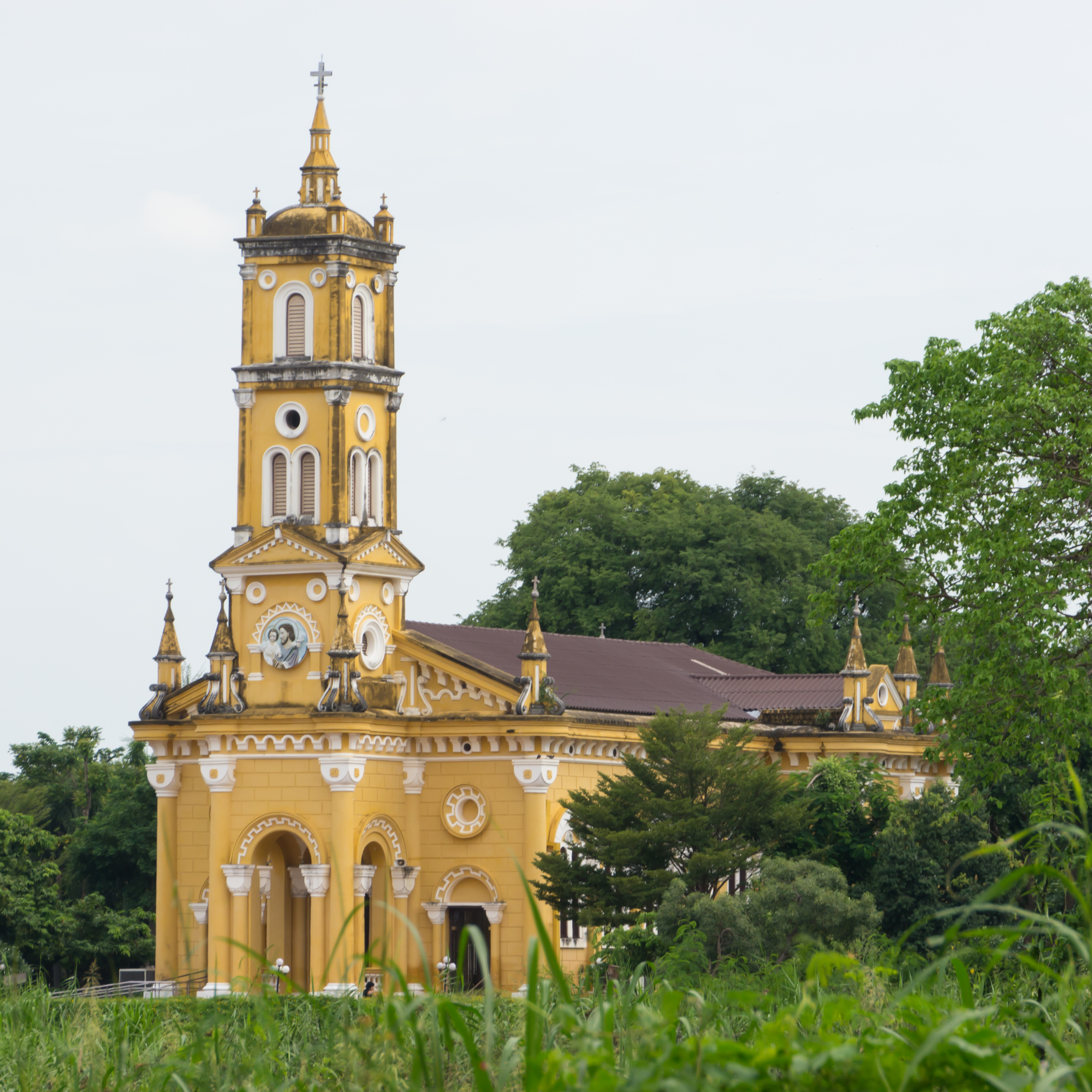
The Saint Joseph Church on the southern side of Ayutthaya, founded in 1662 by French missionaries, was destroyed by the Burmese in March 1767. It was rebuilt in 1831 and transformed into modern Neo-Romanesque architecture in 1883.

By March 1766, there were four main Siamese defense points on the southern front;

- The Siamese regiment at Wat Chai Watthanaram temple to the southwest of Ayutthaya
- The Catholic encampment at Saint Joseph Church on the southern moat, under leadership of Pierre Brigot, the French bishop
- The Portuguese resistance at Ban Portuket, the Portuguese community to the southeast of Ayutthaya
- The Chinese encampment at Khlong Suan Phlu the Teochew Chinese community to the southeast of Ayutthaya, including the abandoned Dutch trade factory

Satpagyon Bo the Burmese commander led his 500 men to attack the Siamese at Wat Chai Watthanaram, who fell after nine days of resistance. Another Burmese commander Uttama Thinka Kyaw led his 500 men to attack the Chinese camps at the old Dutch factory. Both the Chinese and the Portuguese shared their manpower along the defense line and combined their forces to resist the Burmese but to no avail. After resisting for about a month, the Chinese camps fell in mid-March 1767. The Portuguese camp of Ban Portuket also fell on March 21. The Burmese held Catholic priests as hostages, demanding the surrender of Pierre Brigot, the apostolic vicar at Saint Joseph seminary, promising not to destroy Christian churches. Brigot gave himself in to the Burmese, who did not keep their promises and burnt down the churches of Saint Dominic, San Paolo and Saint Joseph on 23 March 1767. The last Siamese defense line on the southern front eventually collapsed.

In late March 1767, Nemyo Thihapate chose the northeastern corner of Ayutthaya at Huaraw as where he would dig the tunnel to penetrate into Ayutthaya. Thihapate ordered the construction of three forts at Huaraw, each with the circumference of 800 tas and the height of ten taung (about 4.5 meters). Each of the Burmese commanders; Satpagyon Bo, Thitsein Bo and Thado Mindin, each with 2,000 men, was assigned to each fort. The three forts were to supervise and to guard the tunnel digging into Ayutthaya. The Burmese dug five tunnels to reach the underlying root of Ayutthaya walls. Chameun Si Sorrarak (called Bra Mundari in Burmese chronicles), who was a brother of Ekkathat's favorite concubine, volunteered to take out the Burmese. The Siamese forces of ten thousand men descended onto the three Burmese forts in packed lines. The Battle of Huaraw was intense as Siamese soldiers stepped on the dead bodies of their comrades to climb their portable ladders into the forts. A large number of Siamese managed to enter the forts, which nearly capitulated to the Siamese. However, Burmese reinforcements arrived in time just to repel the Siamese. 800 Siamese men died in this battle, while another 200 were captured and Chameun Si Sorrarak himself died while returning to the Ayutthaya citadel.

== Fall ==
Thai chronicles described supernatural events before the eventual Fall of Ayutthaya in April 1767 including Buddha statues crying and splitting. The Burmese put wood logs into the tunnel to set fire to the base of the northeastern section of the Ayutthayan wall at Huaraw. On 7 April 1767, at around 3 pm, the Burmese began to set fire at the roots of the wall. At 8 pm, the burnt wall at Huaraw collapsed. Nemyo Thihapate simultaneously had his regiments breach into the Ayutthaya citadel. The Burmese put their ladders onto the Siamese walls on every side. The Burmese entered Ayutthaya citadel through the tunnels and ladders. The remaining Siamese forces of 10,000 men inside of the citadel, under the command of Chaophraya Phrakhlang and Phraya Kalahom, continued to resist in their last stand. The Burmese employed scorched earth tactics in the fallen Ayutthaya city. The Burmese conquerors indiscriminately slaughtered Ayutthaya citizens, plundered for wealth and burnt down all buildings including palaces and temples. The resultant fire ravaged Ayutthaya. Burmese and Thai chronicles gave different accounts on the death of Ekkathat, the last king of Ayutthaya;

- Burmese chronicles state that Ekkathat fled from his palace to the western city gate but was killed by a random gunshot there during the commotion.
- Thai chronicles stated that Ekkathat fled from Ayutthaya city to Wat Sangkhawat on the southern side of the city wall where he died from starvation a week later.

== Aftermath ==
The dead body of Ekkathat was identified by his brother, the monk Uthumphon, who was taken captive by the Burmese. He was hastily buried by the Burmese in a lot at the front of the Mongkhol Bophit temple which is now in burning ruins. The Burmese captured Siamese royal members including Ekkathat's siblings, children and other relatives, as well as Siamese nobility including high-ranking ministers Chaophraya Phrakhlang the Prime Minister, Phraya Yommaraj and Phraya Phollathep. A total of 2,000 Siamese elite people were captured and deported. Siamese wealth including precious gems and metals, elephants, horses, Buddhist scriptures and academic treatises were also taken by the conquerors. The Phra Si Sanphet Buddha image, which stood about sixteen meters tall, was cast in 1500 AD and had been the palladium of the Ayutthaya kingdom for centuries, was destroyed and molten down by the Burmese. The 30,000 remaining Ayutthayan survivors were forcibly relocated to the Burmese capital in Ava. The Burmese also found a huge number of unused firearms including 10,000 flintlock guns, 3,550 small cannons, two large cannons and 50,000 cannon shells. It was then decided that, due to large number of the firearms, the Burmese would only take those with fine qualities and destroy the rest. The Siamese firearms and cannons that were not taken were either put to explosion or dumped into the waters.

Ayutthaya, being one of the largest cities in the world with a population of around a million inhabitants prior to the siege, was looted, burnt and reduced to the ground into ashes and cinder by the conquering Burmese, joined with the corpses of roughly its entire population and garrison. The Burmese have thoroughly sacked the city and looted it of what it's worth, to the point that even none of its grandest palaces survived the destruction, including its ancient Grand Palace which is home to 33 kings of five dynasties and the Sanphet Prasat which was used to welcome foreign envoys and state visitors. With the city completely destroyed, it was therefore unsuitable for the victorious Burmese to set up a large garrison there owing to the total lack of shelter resultant of its destruction. The Burmese thus only left a small garrison in the city, with the rest of their forces either holding onto conquered territory or, in the case of their Shan and Lao contingents, were even demobilized out of confidence over their recent success and victory.

The fall of Ayutthaya in the 7th of April 1767, after a harrowing 14-month siege, led to the fall of the 417-year-old Ayutthaya Kingdom. With the Burmese armies holding the smoldering ruins of Ayutthaya and vast swathes of Siam, the rest of Siam descended into anarchy and civil war as local leaders, with the absence of central authority that came about with the kingdom's fall, declared themselves sovereigns. One of such leaders is Phraya Tak who with a small retinue earlier left the city and broke through the Burmese blockade to eventually set up his own base at Rayong and eventually Chanthaburi after defeating local warlords. Phraya Tak eventually gathered his forces and eventually retook the ruins of Ayutthaya by November 1767 after defeating the Burmese forces and garrisons in and around the ruined city. It took seven months for the Burmese to hold the conquered city until the Siamese liberated it. Phraya Tak eventually crowned himself as king afterwards, becoming King Taksin, but he decided against making Ayutthaya the capital again, owing to its immense destruction and the lack of resources to rebuild it, eventually deciding to relocate the Siamese royal capital at Thonburi to the south which has access to the sea. But while Ayutthaya eventually came back into Siamese possession seven months after it fell to the enemy, it never again regained its grandeur nor recovered as a major city.

== See also ==
- Burmese–Siamese War of 1765–1767
- Burmese-Siamese Wars
- Sino-Burmese War
- Taksin's reunification of Siam
