= Burmese–Siamese War (1775–1776) =

War between the Konbaung dynasty of Burma and Thonburi Kingdom of Siam

- Part of the Burmese–Siamese wars
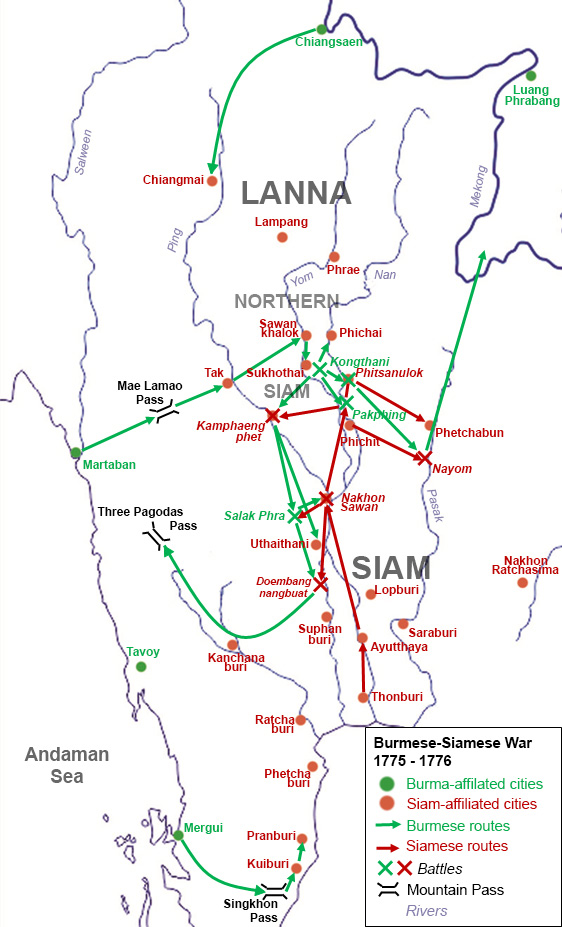
- Map of Maha Thiha Thura's Invasion of Siam in 1775 – 1776. Green represents Burmese army routes. Red represents Siamese army routes.
Date	October 1775 – August 1776
Location	Hua Mueang Nuea or Northern Siam, Central Siam and Lan Na
Result	Siamese victory; depopulation of Northern Cities and destruction of Phitsanulok

Belligerents
Konbaung dynasty (Burma)	Thonburi Kingdom (Siam)

Commanders and leaders
Hsinbyushin # Maha Thiha Thura; Minye Yannaung; Pakan Bo; Pyanchi Yegaung Kyaw; Kyaw Kathu	Taksin; Prince Anurak Songkhram; Chaophraya Chakri; Chaophraya Surasi; Chaophraya Nakhon Sawan; Phraya Yommaraj Mat

Units involved
Royal Burmese Army	Royal Siamese Army

Strength
Main force: 35,000; Diversionary force: 15,000; Total: 50,000	About 20,000

Casualties and losses
Unknown	Unknown

The Burmese–Siamese War (1775–1776) or Maha Thiha Thura's Invasion of Siam or Athi Wungyi's War (Thai: สงครามอะแซหวุ่นกี้) was a major military conflict between the Konbaung dynasty of Burma (now Myanmar) and the Thonburi Kingdom of Siam (now Thailand).

After the Mon Rebellion of 1774 and the successful Siamese capture of Burmese-held Chiang Mai in 1775, King Hsinbyushin assigned Maha Thiha Thura the general of Sino-Burmese War to conduct a large-scale invasion of Northern Siam in late 1775 in order to curb the rising Siamese power under King Taksin of Thonburi. As the Burmese forces outnumbered the Siamese, the three-month siege of Phitsanulok was the main battle of the war. Defenders of Phitsanulok, led by Chaophraya Chakri and Chaophraya Surasi, resisted the Burmese. The war reached stalemate until Maha Thiha Thura decided to disrupt the Siamese supply line, leading to the Fall of Phitsanulok in March 1776. The Burmese gained upper hand but the untimely demise of King Hsinbyushin ruined the Burmese operations as the new Burmese king ordered the withdrawal of all troops back to Ava. The premature exit of Maha Thiha Thura from war in 1776 left the remaining Burmese troops in Siam to retreat in disarray. King Taksin then took this opportunity to send his generals to harass the retreating Burmese. The Burmese forces had completely left Siam by September 1776 and the war was over.

The Maha Thiha Thira's Invasion of Siam in 1775–1776 was the largest Burmese-Siamese war in the Thonburi Period. The war (and subsequent wars) entirely wrecked and depopulated large sections of Siam for decades to come, some regions would not be entirely repopulated until the late 19th century.

== Background ==
=== Reunification of Siam ===
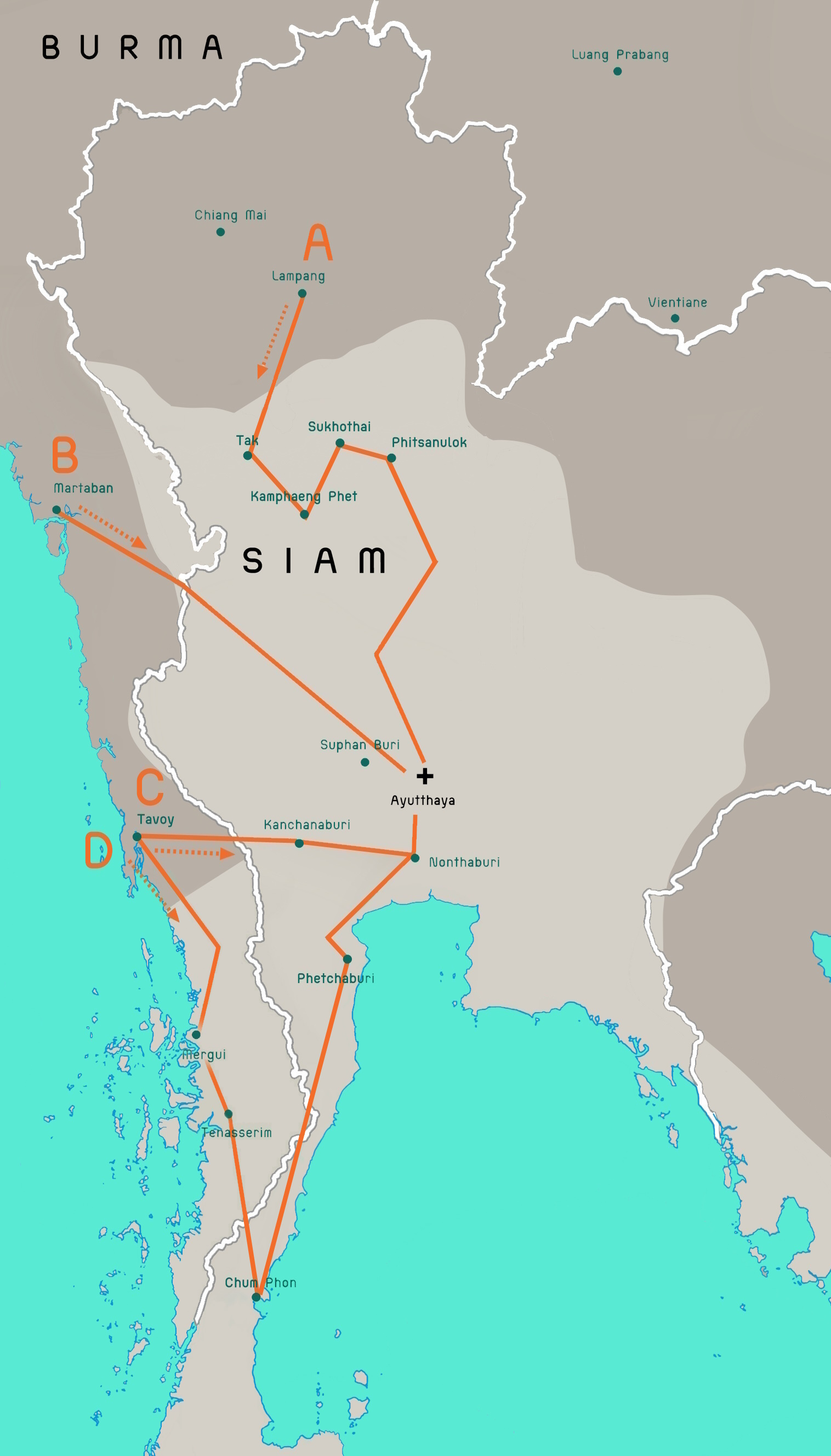
Map showing Burmese invasion routes to Ayutthaya in 1765-1766; Tavoy column under Maha Nawrahta from the west and Burmese-Lanna column under Nemyo Thihapate from the north.

After the fall of the Burmese Toungoo dynasty at the hands of the Mons of the Restored Hanthawaddy Kingdom in 1752, the new Burmese Konbaung dynasty emerged powerful. King Hsinbyushin of Burma was determined to accomplish the unfinished campaign of his father Alaungpaya to conquer Siam. He sent Nemyo Thihapate to pacify Lanna in 1764 and to proceed to conquer Ayutthaya and also sent another general Maha Nawrahta to lead Burmese troops from Tavoy to attack Ayutthaya, imposing two-pronged pincer attack onto Ayutthaya. Burmese Tavoy column under Maha Nawrahta and the Burmese-Lanna column under Nemyo Thihapate converged on Ayutthaya in January 1766. Ayutthaya under Siamese king Ekkathat sent out forces in attempts to repel and dislodge Burmese besiegers at Ayutthayan outskirts but all failed. Phraya Tak, the governor of Tak of Teochew Chinese descent, with personal name Zheng Xin (鄭信) or Zheng Zhao (鄭昭), who had been called to defend Ayutthaya, was among the Siamese commanders. Phraya Tak and his comrade Phraya Phetchaburi Rueang the governor of Phetchaburi fought the Burmese regiment of Maha Nawrahta at Wat Phukahothong temple to the northwest of Ayutthaya citadel but were eventually outmaneuvered and defeated. Situation for Ayutthaya defenders became dire and worsened as the Burmese unexpectedly persisted in the rainy season, depleting Ayutthaya of manpower and resources. With his comrade Phraya Phetchaburi dying in battle in November 1766 and ineffective leadership under Siamese king Ekkathat, Phraya Tak became desperate and decided to leave Ayutthaya. In January 1767, about three months before the eventual fall of Ayutthaya, Phraya Tak gathered 500 Chinese–Siamese followers to break through Burmese encirclement to the east. Phraya Tak fought through Burmese forces and local Siamese resistances all the way from Ayutthaya down to Eastern Siam, encamping at Rayong in late January 1767.

It was in Rayong that Phraya Tak learned about the fall of Ayutthaya in April 1767. In June 1767, Phraya Tak moved to attack and conquer the rival regime of Chanthaburi. Phraya Tak spent about four months at Chanthaburi on Siamese Eastern coast gathering his army and building his ships. In October 1767, Phraya Tak set sail with his forces of 5,000 men from Chanthaburi to reconquer Ayutthaya. After the fall of Ayutthaya in April 1767, the Burmese conquerors under Nemyo Thihapate left Ayutthaya two months later in June because the ongoing Sino-Burmese War prompted Burma to divert most of its occupying forces in Ayutthaya to the Chinese front. Nemyo Thihapate left only a handful of men under Thugyi the Mon headman at Phosamton (modern Bang Pahan district) to the north of Ayutthaya to occupy Lower Central Siam but the rest of Siam was divided under many regional regimes. Phraya Tak, with his forces, prevailed over Thugyi in the Battle of Phosamton in November 1767 and reconquered Ayutthaya from the Burmese occupiers, seven months after the fall of Ayutthaya. Phraya Tak found that the royal city of Ayutthaya, the royal capital of Siam for four centuries, was in the state of ruins and could not be a tenable fortress against the prospective Burmese retaliation. In strategic move, Phraya Tak established his new Siamese capital at Thonburi to the south of Ayutthaya. Phraya Tak officially enthroned himself on 28 December 1767 as King Taksin, reestablishing Siam and founding the Thonburi kingdom.

Following the Sack of Ayutthaya in 1767, a power vacuum emerged in Siam, which was filled by the establishment of five separate Siamese regimes—Phimai, Phitsanulok, Sawangburi, Nakhon Si Thammarat, and Thonburi. The Siamese state of Thonburi, led by Taksin, formerly the governor of Tak Province in Siam, would ultimately prevail out of the four, subjugating its four rival states and reunifying Siam by 1771. The Burmese, meanwhile, were preoccupied in having to contend with four major Qing invasions of Burma in 1765–69, thereby delaying an effective response to the new Siamese king. Taksin, from his capital of Thonburi, repelled a Burmese incursion in the Battle of Bangkung in 1768.

=== Sino–Burmese War ===
Conflicts between Konbaung Burma and China under the Qing dynasty over the sovereignty over the frontier Tai-Shan polities including Hsenwi, Kengtung and Sipsongpanna led to the Sino-Burmese War. In retaliation for Burmese attack on Sipsongpanna, Liu Zhao (劉藻) the viceroy of Yungui led Chinese forces to attack Burmese-held Kengtung in 1765 but was repelled. Liu Zhao committed suicide in guilt and he was replaced by another viceroy Yang Yingju (楊應琚), who, from his base at Yongchang, sent Qing armies to directly invade Burma in October 1766 but faced tough resistance from the Burmese stockade of Kaungton, unable to proceed further. Qing invasions came in the same time when the Burmese forces were besieging Ayutthaya. Burma then had to conduct war on two fronts simultaneously; the Siamese and the Chinese fronts. Another Qing army attacked Theinni but was outflanked from the rear by Maha Thiha Thura from Sipsongpanna. As tropical malaria ravaged, Qing Chinese forces ended up being repelled and besieged in their own town of Longchuan. Covering up his defeats, Yang Yingju sent false reports to Emperor Qianlong but his lies were eventually exposed and Yang Yingju was called to Beijing to be forced to commit suicide as punishment.

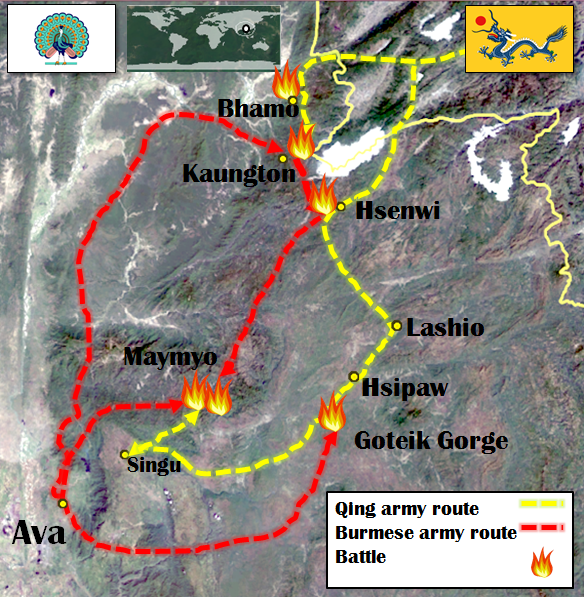
Chinese invasion routes during the third invasion of Burma in 1767-68; Mingrui with majority of the Qing forces invaded through Theinni, while his colleague E'erjing'er invaded Bhamo.

Chinese invasions prompted Burmese king Hsinbyushin to call the Burmese contingents from Siam to the Chinese front. Suffering from humiliating defeats, Emperor Qianlong was determined to conquer Burma to uphold dignity. The emperor blamed Han Chinese Green Standard regiment for failures and began to employ Manchu bannermen in the Burmese campaign. Qianlong sent a Manchu general Mingrui (明瑞) as the new Yungui viceroy and leader of the campaign. Mingrui, with mixed Han-Manchu forces of 25,000 men, invaded Burma in November 1767, seizing Theinni and defeating the Burmese in the Battle of Goteik Gorge – the first major Qing victory (Meanwhile, Phraya Tak expelled the Burmese occupation forces from Ayutthaya in November 1767). Mingrui and his forces reached Singu, just thirty miles north of the Burmese royal capital of Ava but another Qing army intended to converge on Ava could not get through the formidable Kaungton fortress. It was during this time that the Burmese tactic of attacking and disrupting communication supply line came into play, becoming staple and crucial strategy for future Burmese successes. Maha Thiha Thura, with Burmese forces of 20,000 men, retook Theinni to sever the Qing supply line and to block the exit of the Qing army, entrapping the Qing forces starved inside of Burma. Mingrui and the Qing forces decided to retreat but suffered deadly defeats at the hands of the Burmese in the Battle of Maymyo and at Mongyu in March 1768, where many Qing commanders were killed. Mingrui himself cut his Manchu queue sending to the emperor as apology and hanged himself on a tree in suicide.

Not giving up, Qianlong appointed his brother-in-law and chief state councilor Fuheng (傅恆) to be the new leader of the Burmese campaign in April 1768. Fuheng devised a new strategy. He preferred the route down along the Irrawaddy River to directly attack Ava. In October 1769, having total of 40,000 men, Fuheng sent some Qing forces to seize control of Shan States of Mongkawng and Mongyang, gaining access to the Irrawaddy, constructing his fleet and establishing the Chinese fortress at Shwenyaungbin. Fuheng, however, was too slow as Hsinbyushin quickly sent the Burmese fleet of 12,000 men under Nemyo Sithu to destroy the newly-constructed Qing fleet at Mogaung and sent massive Burmese army of 52,000 men under Maha Thiha Thura to successfully take the Chinese Shwenyaungbin fortress. A Burmese regiment was specifically assigned to disrupt Chinese supply line. Eventually, the malaria overwhelmed the Chinese forces with many Qing commanders dying or falling ill. Fuheng himself was incapacitated by the illness and relegated his duty to his deputy Agui (阿桂). Agui preferred peace and opened negotiation with Maha Thiha Thura. Without approval from the Burmese king, Maha Thiha Thura reached an agreement with Agui on 22 December 1769 in the Treaty of Kaungton, with the Qing promising to recognize Burmese sovereignty over the disputed Shan princedoms in exchange for Burma sending elusive amicable 'tributary' missions to Beijing. (In the same time, King Taksin was conquering the Southern Siamese regional regime of Chao Nakhon Nu in late 1769.) Fuheng died from illness shortly after.

The Treaty of Kaungton practically ended the Sino–Burmese War but Burmese king Hsinbyushin, enraged, did not accept this agreement. Facing the wrath of his overlord, Maha Thiha Thura led the Burmese forces to attack Manipur in early 1770 to appease the Burmese king. As Burma did not actually send those said missions to China, Emperor Qianlong ordered the shutdown of the Sino–Burmese borders, disrupting the trade at the expense of local Chinese and Shan merchants. Burma and China remained technically at war for two decades until 1788 when, through manipulation of the Shans who wanted the Sino–Burmese trade to resume, King Bodawpaya of Burma sent a diplomatic mission to Beijing. Qianlong finally consented to Burmese sovereignty over the disputed Shan States and lifted the trade embargo at the border.

=== Resumption of Burmese–Siamese conflicts ===
Despite the Fall of Ayutthaya and the total destruction of the Siamese Kingdom in 1767, the Siamese had recovered and consolidated under the leadership of Phraya Tak or King Taksin. After peace was officially concluded between Konbaung Burma and Qing China, the Burmese king was eager to subjugate the newly rising rival Siamese power. Hsinbyushin ordered Nemyo Thihapate to gather troops at Lanna Chiang Mai and appointed Mingyi Kamani Sanda as the new governor of Martaban to organize forces to invade Siam in 1772. Hsinbyushin intended to inflict the pincer attack on Siam both from the north and from the west, in similar manner to the Burmese invasion of 1765–67.

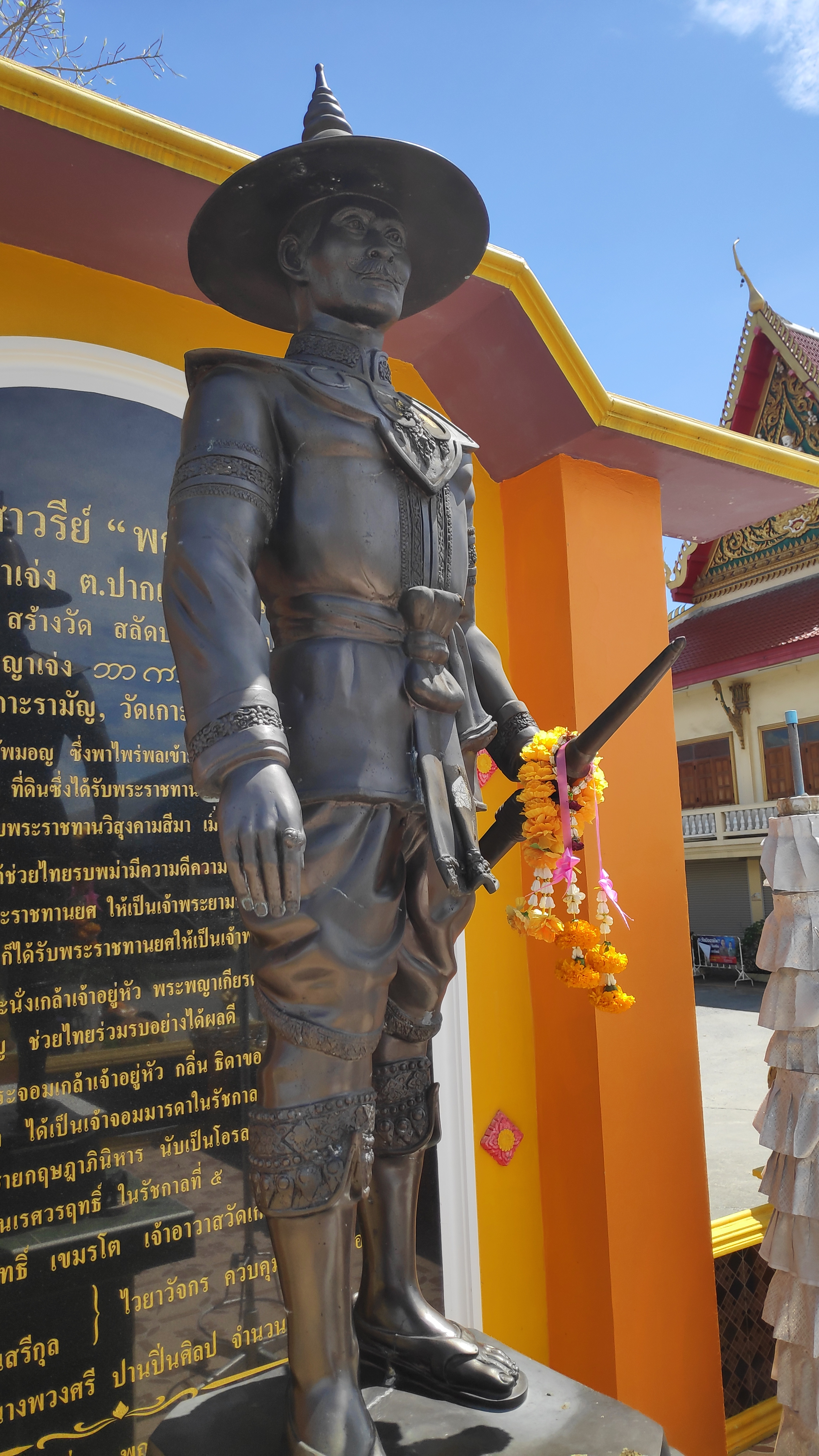
Binnya Sein (Mon: ဗညာစိင် Thai: พระยาเจ่ง), led an attempted rebellion against Burma in 1774 and took residence in Siam. He later became Chaophraya Mahayotha the commander of Mon regiment for King Rama I.

At this time, the Burmese military command had broken down. Dissension was rampant. Field commanders increasingly acted like warlords and behaved with arrogance towards the people, and began to ignore even the king's orders which created rebellions by their otherwise loyal leaders. In 1774, Mingyi Kamani Sanda the governor of Martaban ordered the Mon regiment under the command of Mon leaders including Binnya Sein (a nephew of Binnya Dala, the former king of Hanthawaddy Kingdom), to lead the vanguard army to invade Siam through the Three Pagodas Pass. Once the Mon leaders had left Martaban, however, Mingyi Kamani Sanda forcibly extorted money and wealth from the Mon families and inhabitants of Martaban to fund the campaigns. News reached Binnya Sein and other Mon leaders about the Burmese mistreatments in their absences. The Mon leaders were then enraged that, despite their contributions to the Burmese cause, their fellows and families behind were unjustly abused. Binnya Sein and other Mon leaders mutinied and marched back to seize Martaban. Mingyi Kamani Sanda fled and took refuge at Yangon. The Mon forces continued marching and managed to temporarily take control of Yangon but were eventually repelled by the Burmese rescue armies. Defeated, Binnya Sein took safety shelter in Siam. Great number of Mon people from Martaban also went on the mass exodus into Siam through the Mae Lamao Pass and the Three Pagodas Pass to escape the punishing hands of their Burmese overseers. In 1774, King Hsinbyushin assigned Wungyi Maha Thiha Thura, the renown general from the Sino-Burmese War, called Athi Wungyi (Thai: อะแซหวุ่นกี้) in Thai sources, to lead the Burmese troops of 35,000 men to Martaban to capture the Mons and to invade Siam.

In late 1774, Taksin led an expedition to capture the Burmese-held Chiang Mai. Taksin rested his royal armies at Tak where he was informed about the incoming Mon refugees and the Burmese pursuers. Taksin stationed some of his troops at Tak in order to welcome the Mons and to guard against possible Burmese incursions before marching himself to the north. The incoming Burmese invaders from the West in pursue of the Mons urged King Taksin to press on his campaigns in Chiang Mai. The Siamese were able to take Chiang Mai in January 1775 and Taksin hurried his troops down south to capitalize the Mon refugee crisis.

=== Bangkaeo Campaign (1775) ===
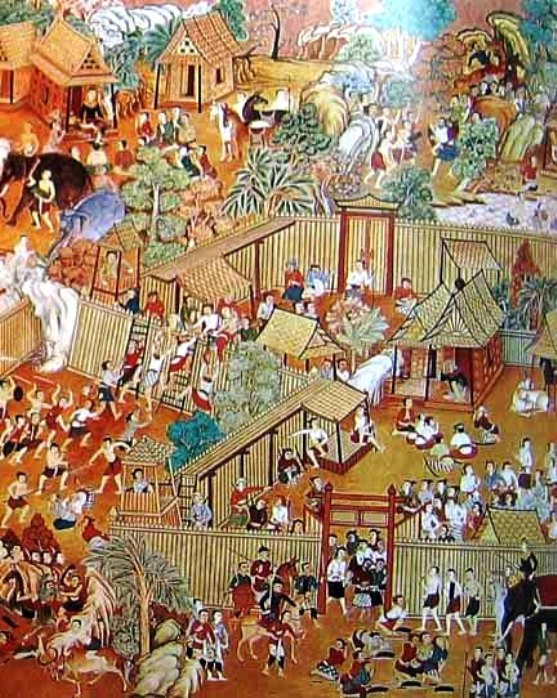
Depiction of the Battle of Bangkaeo from the Old Thonburi Palace.

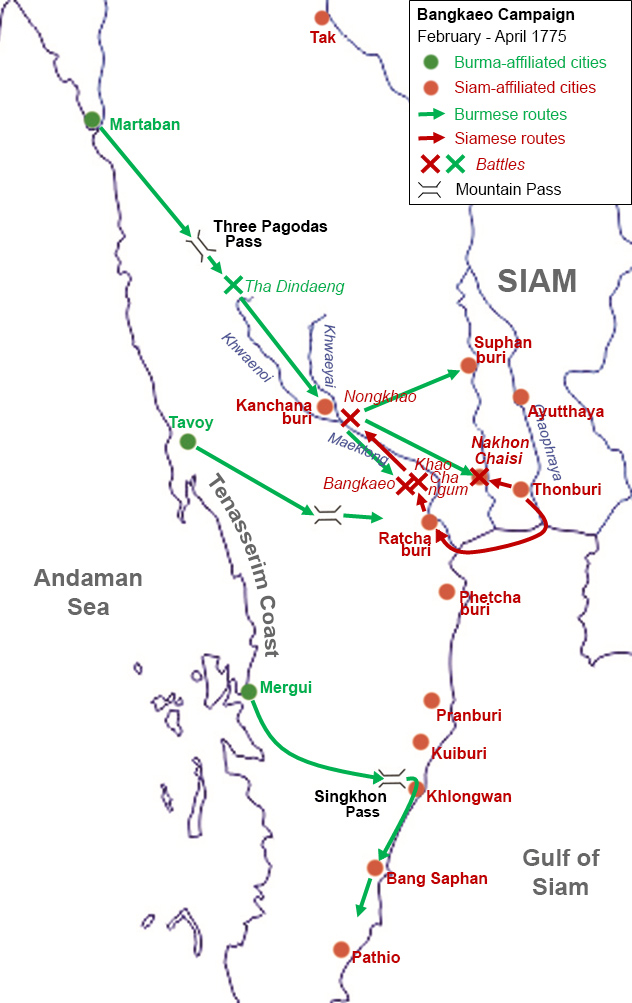
The Burmese invaded Western Siam in February 1775, encamping at Bangkaeo in modern Ratchaburi. Siam sent forces to encircle the Burmese, who surrendered a month later, in the Bangkaeo Campaign.

Maha Thiha Thira ordered Minye Yannaung and Satpagyon Bo, a Burmese general with experiences in waging war with the Siamese during the 1765–1767 invasion, to lead the Burmese troops of 8,000 men into Siam through the Three Pagodas Pass in February 1775. Minye Yannaung took Kanchanaburi where he encamped the main armies and sent Satpagyon Bo downstream to Bangkaeo, Ratchaburi. King Taksin sent his son Prince Chui and his nephew Prince Rammalak to lead the preliminary troops to deal with the invading Burmese at Ratchaburi as the majority of the Siamese troops were in the north. Prince Chui and Prince Rammalak ordered their forces to encircle Satpagyon Bo at Bangkaeo. Satpagyon Bo was over-confident in his expertise with Siamese troops as he allowed the Siamese to completely surround him. King Taksin left Thonburi with the main royal army to Ratchaburi. Taksin ordered the Burmese at Bangkaeo to be totally encircled and isolated in order to starve them into surrender.

Remaining northern armies, led by Chaophraya Chakri and Chaophraya Surasi, eventually arrived at the battlefield of Bangkaeo, bringing the number of Siamese troops up to 20,000 men. After about one and a half month of isolation with minimal food and water, Satpagyon Bo and the Burmese at Bangkaeo surrendered and submitted to King Taksin on March 31, 1775. Minye Yannaung retreated back to Martaban in April. The Siamese took a great number of about 2,000 of Burmese as captives to Thonburi. The surrendered Burmese generals revealed to Taksin that the general Maha Thiha Thura was planning a great campaign to invade Siam. King Taksin then took the initiatives to prepare for the defenses against the prospective Burmese invasion. The king proposed to levy more troops from the southern cities of Chanthaburi, Chumphon, Nakhon Si Thammarat and Phatthalung. Chaophraya Chakri told the king that those southern forces might not arrive on time to fight the Burmese and the king should rely on the available northern troops. King Taksin then ordered those southern cities to contribute rice supplies to the campaigns instead.

King Taksin also awarded his son and his nephew with titles for their leaderships in the Bangkaeo campaign. Prince Chui became Kromma Khun Inthraphithak and Prince Rammalak became Kromma Khun Anurak Songkhram.

=== Burmese preparations ===
The strategy of King Hsinbyushin to invade Siam from two directions and converge was foiled by the Siamese capture of Chiang Mai and the Mon Rebellion at Martaban. The retreated Minye Yannaung reported Maha Thiha Thura about the Burmese' crushing defeat at Bangkaeo. Maha Thiha Thura applied the strategy of King Bayinnaung of the sixteenth century against Siam by securing Northern Siamese cities of the Upper Chao Phraya Valley (called Hua Mueang Nuea Thai: หัวเมืองเหนือ in Thai, including Phitsanulok, Sukhothai, Sawankhalok, Kamphaengphet, etc.) and using it as the base for military operations in Lower Siam. Phitsanulok had been the Mueang Ek or political administrative center of Northern Siam since the Ayutthaya Period with Chaophraya Surasi Boonma as the governor since 1770.

King Hsinbyushin travelled from his court at Ava to Yangon in March 1774 and had been there to raise the height of the Shwedagon Pagoda to 327 feet. Maha Thiha Thura sent a letter to the Burmese king at Yangon, proposing his plan to invade Northern Siam through the Mae Lamao Pass at Tak, citing that Northern Siam had been 'plentiful'. Hsinbyushin consented and ordered Maha Thiha Thura to lay waste on the towns of Upper Chao Phraya as planned.

Maha Thiha Thura ordered Nemyo Thihapate and Thado Mindin, who had been defeated by the Siamese earlier that year and expelled from Chiang Mai to regroup at Chiang Saen, to retake Chiang Mai in that rainy season and to bring food supplies from the north to the campaign of Maha Thiha Thura. Nemyo Thihapate and Thado Mindin took off from Chiang Saen to invade Chiang Mai in September 1775. Phraya Vichienprakarn (formerly Phaya Chaban) the governor of Chiang Mai informed the Thonburi court about the Burmese invasion. King Taksin then assigned the two Chaophrayas Chakri and Surasi to bring the northern regiments to defend Chiang Mai.

Once the northern Siamese troops had left for Chiang Mai, Maha Thiha Thura marched his massive army of 35,000 men from Martaban through the Mae Lamao Pass into Northern Siam in October 1775. His subordinate generals included his own younger brother and other generals including Minye Yannaung, Pakan Bo, Pyanchi Yegaung Kyaw and Kyaw Kathu.

However, none of the Burmese commanders were enthusiastic about the invasion. The king was dying, and the palace of full of rumors and intrigues. Maha Thiha Thura himself was more worried about the succession affairs as the heir-apparent Singu was his son-in-law. Maha Thiha Thura had faced many difficulties in raising an invasion force, and had to wait until the end of rainy season in 1775 to start the invasion.

== Burmese offensives (October 1775 – March 1776) ==
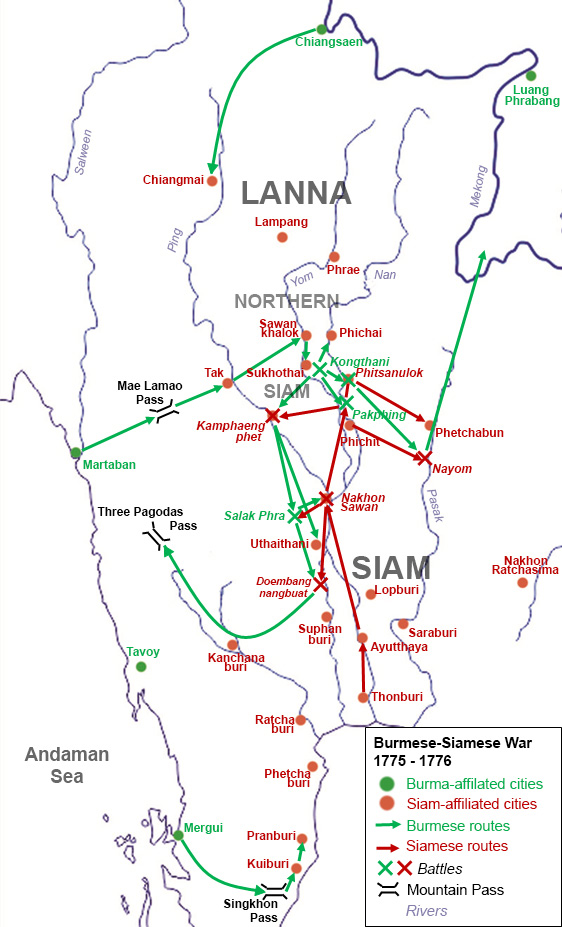
Map of Maha Thiha Thura's Invasion of Siam in 1775 – 1776. Green represents Burmese army routes. Red represents Siamese army routes.

=== Siege of Phitsanulok ===
Nemyo Thihapate and Thado Mindin, with a combined force of 15,000 men, marched Burmese forces from Chiang Saen to attack Chiang Mai. When the two Chaophrayas arrived at Chiang Mai to reinforce, Nemyo Thihapate and Thado Mindin retreated from Chiang Mai. The Burmese invasion of Chiang Mai served as a decoy to attract the Siamese attention to Chiang Mai while Maha Thiha Thira was marching into Northern Siam. Northern Siam was left less defended when the Burmese general entered from Mae Lamao Pass. The governors of Tak and Kamphaengphet, due to their inferior manpower, decided to abandon their cities and took their inhabitants to seek shelter in the forests. Maha Thiha Thura quickly took Sawankhalok and Sukhothai in October 1775. Chakri and Surasi at Chiang Mai, upon learning of the Burmese invasion at their back, marched their armies to return to Sukhothai with great haste. Maha Thiha Thura rested his armies at Kongthani, about twenty kilometers to the east of Sukhothai, to gather food and resources. Chakri decided to return to Phitsanulok to set up defenses while his younger brother Surasi intended to face the Burmese. Surasi and Phraya Sukhothai the governor of Sukhothai faced the Burmese in the Battle of Kongthani in October 1775. The Burmese prevailed and Surasi retreated to Phitsanulok.

Maha Thiha Thura stayed at Kongthani for two months to gather resources while Chaophrayas Chakri and Surasi established the defenses at Phitsanulok. Maha Thiha Thura left 5,000 men of his forces at Kongthani as rearguard and marched the main armies of 30,000 men to lay siege on Phitsanulok in December 1775. Maha Thiha Thura also sent some of his forces to attack Phichai. Chaophrayas Chakri and Surasi personally led the Siamese forces to assault on Burmese lines to break the encirclement many times but did not succeed. The Burmese vanguard was particularly armed with flintlock muskets.

=== Taksin at Pakphing ===
King Taksin learned about the Burmese invasion in January 1776. He went to ask Satpagyon Bo, the Burmese captive general, that whether he would serve and march against the invading Burmese. Satpagyon Bo denied, saying that he was too ashamed to face his own former comrades. Taksin then realized that the loyalty and submission of the captured Burmese generals from the Bangkaeo campaign were not genuine. They might insurrect if the royal capital of Thonburi was left thinly-defended. King Taksin then had Satpagyon Bo, together with other Burmese captured generals and the remaining followers of Chao Phra Fang executed to ensure the security of Thonburi. King Taksin ordered his nephew Prince Anurak Songkhram to go south and station at Phetchaburi against possible Burmese incursions from the Singkhon Pass.

On January 16, 1776, King Taksin left Thonburi with his royal riverine fleet of 12,270 men to the north. He assigned his Chinese general Chen Lian to station the Chinese regiment at Nakhon Sawan to guard the royal supply line from Thonburi. Taksin reached Pakphing on January 27, about twenty kilometers to the south of Phitsanulok. Pakphing was a strategic position as it was at the mouth of Phing canal that connected Yom River of Sukhothai and Nan River of Phitsanulok – an important line of communications between the two cities. King Taksin established a twenty-kilometer defense line from Pakphing to the besieging Burmese at Phitsanulok on the east bank of Nan river, while the Burmese occupied mainly on the west bank. As soon as the Siamese had established their defense line, the Burmese from the west bank crossed the Nan river to attack the Siamese camps on the east bank several times. The Burmese outnumbered the Siamese forces, with 30,000 men strong on the Burmese side while Siam had 20,000 men. Chaophraya Nakhon Sawan at Wat Chan took charge of penetrating the Burmese siege from the south to relieve Phitsanulok. The two Chaophrayas attacked the Burmese from inside of Phitsanulok while Nakhon Sawan attacked from outside in cooperation but did not succeed.

King Taksin decided to outflank the Burmese on the west bank by diverting the forces of Chaophraya Nakhon Sawan to attack the Burmese from the rear. Nakhon Sawan attempted in many maneuvers to outflank the Burmese on the west bank but failed.

=== Disruption of Siamese supply line ===
The war then reached an uneasy stalemate. While the Burmese stood strong in their besieging of Phitsanulok, they were unable to take the city with ease. The Siamese focused on their breaking of Burmese siege and attacking the Burmese from the rear but without fruitful results. Maha Thiha Thira broke this stalemate by ordering his rearguard at Kongthani to march south to attack Siamese supply line at Nakhon Sawan. Phraya Sukhothai noticed the Burmese movements and reported to King Taksin on February 10. Taksin then realized that the Burmese might try to disrupt his supply lines and sent Binnya Sein to bring the Mon regiment to Kamphaegphet to see that whether the Burmese from Kongthani came in that direction. Binnya Sein met the Burmese at Kamphaengphet and engaged, leading to the Battle of Kamphaengphet on February 16, 1776. Even though Binnya Sein prevailed, the Burmese were able to encamped at Kamphaengphet and went on to attack and burn down Uthaithani. King Taksin shifted more forces from the Nan river defense line at Pakphing to guard the supply lines at Nakhon Sawan and Pho Prathap Chang.

King Taksin faced the dilemma of conducting war on two fronts: both at Phitsanulok and at Uthaithani. Also, on February 16, reported came from the south that the Burmese forces from Mergui had gone through the Singkhon pass to successfully burn down Kuiburi and Pranburi. Prince Anurak Songkhram guarded against the Burmese at Phetchaburi.

=== Battle of Pakphing ===
Both the Burmese and the Siamese suffered from food supply shortages. The promised supply from Chiang Saen did not come to the Burmese. The Burmese were still able to gather food from the wild while the Siamese were restricted to the supplies in Phitsanulok and from Thonburi. As of March 1776, King Taksin decided to adopt more defensive, less offensive strategy. On February 18, Taksin summoned Chaophrayas Chakri and Surasi to meet him. Chakri had been ill and only Surasi visited the king. Taksin told Surasi that he was planning to move the royal base to Nakhon Sawan to protect the supply line and to wait for Maha Thiha Thura to run out of his resources.

As King Taksin had shifted his forces from the defense line to the west bank of Nan river and to guard the supply line, he unintentionally spread his forces thin. Maha Thiha Thura took this opportunity. On February 29, the Burmese surprisingly assaulted from the west bank to successfully gain a foothold at Wat Phrik, the first Burmese holding on the east bank. The loss at Wat Phrik was a major setback for the Siamese as the Burmese managed to break the defense line. King Taksin was greatly alarmed by this incident that he ordered nearly all survivors from Wat Phrik executed. Next day, on March 1, Chaophraya Nakhon Sawan urged the Siamese king to withdraw all Siamese troops from west bank to the east to deal with the Burmese at Wat Phrik as the Siamese defense line itself on the east bank risked being outflanked by the Burmese.

The defensive forces in Phitsanulok began to run out of food. King Taksin ordered the royal food supply from Pakphing, guarded by a royal force, to be delivered to Phitsanulok. However, the Burmese general Pakan Bo made sure the Siamese could not connect to send supplies. Pakan Bo attacked Siamese food cargoes and the Siamese were unable to relieve Phitsanulok with food supplies. The situation in Phitsanulok became deteriorated for the Siamese.

Maha Thiha Thura eventually marched to face King Taksin himself at Pakphing in late February 1776, leading to the Battle of Pakphing. The Siamese royal forces was outmaneuvered by the Burmese. King Taksin then decided to retreat from Pakphing down south to Phichit on March 14, 1776. The whole defense line on the east bank of Nan river collapsed and retreated along with the king to Phichit.

=== Fall of Phitsanulok ===
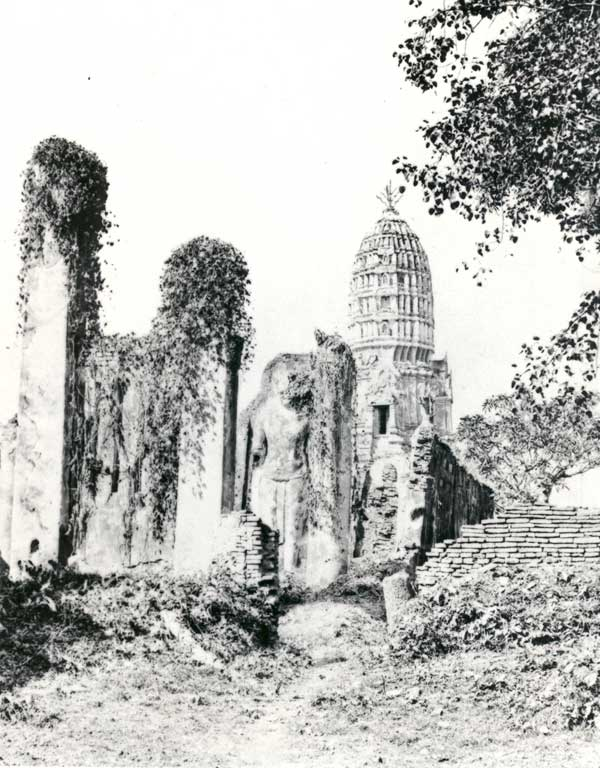
Phitsanulok, the administrative center of Northern Siam, was completely destroyed by the Burmese in March 1776. All buildings and temples were burnt down with the exception of Wat Phra Mahathat (shown here in the photo).

As the Siamese at Pakphing were defeated and retreated to Phichit, Phitsanulok was left isolated. Maha Thiha Thura was free to concentrate his forces on Phitsanulok as he was required to finish the war before his resources ran out. The Siamese in Phitsanulok were in a very dire condition as their food provisions depleted. Chakri and Surasi were unable to hold the city of Phitsanulok any longer. Upon learning that King Taksin had moved to Phichit, the two Chaophrayas decided to plan for the evacuation of Phitsanulok. King Taksin had earlier granted the permission to abandon Phitsanulok in case of inevitability. Chakri and Surasi withdrew all Siamese troops from outside Phitsanulok into the city and the Burmese attacked the city wall. The two Chaophrayas collected the inhabitants of Phitsanulok and led the vanguard troops with the inhabitants, who were all armed including women, in the middle to stage an all-out attack on the Burmese on the east side of Phitsanulok to break free. The Burmese resisted strongly but eventually gave way for the Siamese. On March 15, 1776, Chaophrayas Chakri and Surasi managed to break free from the Burmese at Phisanulok and regrouped at Banmung and Chomphu to the east of Phitsanulok. The inhabitants of Phitsanulok either fled to Phetchabun, Phichit, took refuge in the forests or captured by the Burmese.

Maha Thiha Thura eventually took Phitsanulok. Phitsanulok, which had been the political center of Northern Siam since the fifteenth century, was utterly and completely destroyed on this occasion. The Burmese set the city ablaze as shining as daylight. All buildings, palaces and temples in Phitsanulok were burnt down and destroyed with only Wat Phra Mahathat left standing. The Burmese gathered Siamese valuables and people from Phitsanulok to be sent to Burma.

== Burmese retreat and Siamese counter-offensives (May- September 1776) ==
=== Death of King Hsinbyushin ===
After the Fall of Phitsanulok in March 1776, Maha Thiha Thura and the Burmese occupied Northern Siam. After their victory, the Burmese faced a food supply shortage. Maha Thiha Thura commanded his generals to attack and take other cities in order to find more provisions in preparations to continue his campaign to attack Thonburi. He ordered Pakan Bo to attack Kamphaengphet and Pyanchi Yegaung Kyaw to attack Phetchabun.

King Hsinbyushin of Burma died on 10 June 1776. His son Prince Singusa succeeded him as King Singu Min. The new Burmese king recalled the Burmese generals Nemyo Thihapate from Chiang Saen and Maha Thiha Thira in Siam back to Ava. News of the Burmese succession reached Maha Thiha Thura in Siam. Maha Thira Thira then recalled his subordinate generals but they had ventured far into Siamese territories. In haste, Maha Thiha Thura decided to leave his generals and forces in Siam and immediately left for Ava, taking Northern Siamese captives and valuables with him to Burma. The remaining Burmese forces in Siam was then left disorganized and uncontrolled.

=== Burmese retreat and Siamese pursuits ===
Chaophraya Chakri and Chaophraya Surasi, who had earlier broke free from the Burmese at Phitsanulok, regrouped at Banmung and Chomphu and proceeded further to Phetchabun, where they gathered resources and rested. Chakri and Surasi then led the remaining Siamese defenders down south to Saraburi and marched north to pursue the retreating Burmese at Sukhothai.

King Taksin and Phraya Yommaraj Mat (son of Chaophraya Chakri Mud) stationed at Phichit, where they received the Northern Siamese refugees from Phitsanulok. News of Burmese disorganized retreat reached King Taksin and he ordered his generals to pursue the retreating Burmese. He commanded Chaophraya Nakhon Sawan and Phraya Yommaraj Mat to march against the Burmese at Kamphaeng Phet and Phraya Pollathep to Phetchabun. Pakan Bo the Burmese general was at Kamphaeng Phet with 2,000 men. The Burmese regiment was divided into two subdivisions, with 1,000 men returning westward to Burma and another 1,000 men went south and attacked Uthaithani again, intending to go through the Three Pagodas Pass. King Taksin moved from Phichit to Nakhon Sawan in May 1776 and eventually returned to Thonburi on May 31, 1776.

Phraya Yommaraj Mat reached Kamphaeng Phet and found out that the Burmese had already evacuated and moved south. Yommaraj Mat then marched south to pursue the Burmese. He met the 1,000-men Burmese division at Salak Phra near Uthaithani and engaged in the Battle of Salak Phra in June 1776. The Burmese resisted standing strong and Yommaraj Mat was compelled to retreat. Another Burmese party under Pakan Bo attacked Nakhon Sawan. King Taksin ordered his nephews Prince Anurak Songkhram and Prince Ramphubet to lead the vanguard to rescue Nakhon Sawan. King Taksin himself marched north from Thonburi on July 27, 1776. Princes Anurak Songkhram and Ramphubet engaged with Pakan Bo in the Battle of Nakhon Sawan in August 1776. The two Siamese princes prevailed and Pakan Bo retreated west towards Kamphaeng Phet. King Taksin reached Nakhon Sawan and, by himself, pursued Pakan Bo to Kamphaeng Phet, Tak and as far as the Mae Lamao Pass.

Phraya Phollathep met Pyanchi Yegaung Kyaw at Nayom near Phetchabun, leading to the Battle of Nayom in August 1776. Pyanchi Yegaung Kyaw was defeated and retreated with the remaining Burmese north towards Luang Phrabang, which had been a Burmese tributary kingdom. Pyanchi Yegaung Kyaw marched through Luang Phrabang and Chiang Saen to eventually return to Burma.

As Maha Thiha Thura returned to Burma, the remaining Burmese forces in Siam ran free to pillage Siamese countryside for about five months and the war resorted to guerilla warfare. After series of Burmese disorganized retreats and Siamese spreading pursuits, the Burmese had all left Siam by August 1776 and King Taksin ordered all troops to return to Thonburi on August 24, 1776.

== Aftermath ==
The Maha Thiha Thira's Invasion of Siam in 1775–1776 was the largest and most intensive Burmese-Siamese war in the Thonburi Period. Even though the Siamese achieved the tactical victory due to the death of the Burmese king Hsinbyushin prompting the Burmese armies to return and ended the war, the Burmese were successful in their goal to lay waste and damage the Northern Siamese cities, most notably Phitsanulok, pillaging and capturing about 2,000 Northern Siamese back to Burma. The Burmese was then considered to accomplish the strategic victory.

If Hsinbyushin had not died during the war, it would be possible that Maha Thiha Thura would conduct full-scale offensives on the city of Thonburi and Siam might fall to the Burmese again. Siam was on the verge of being destroyed by the Burmese for the second time after the Fall of Ayutthaya in 1767. The death of King Hsinbyushin saved Siam from such fate. Thonburi court remained vigilant as they speculated other Burmese invasions in subsequent years and King Taksin prepared by ordering the Siamese war refugees and provisions to be gathered into Thonburi. After this war, Taksin adopted more defensive strategy by reinforcing Thonburi itself as the main stronghold against the Burmese as the Siamese were proven unable to defeat the outnumbering Burmese in open fields. Fortunately, Burmese invasions did not come as the Burmese court was embroiled in its own succession disputes. This could also be interpreted as a Siamese strategic victory and a Burmese tactical victory. While Maha Thiha Thura was able to defeat multiple Siamese armies, the Siamese resistance was great enough to halt the Burmese army from retaking Siam.

The Burmese invasion of 1775–1776 devastated the cities and towns of Mueang Nuea or Northern Siam, which were mostly spared from destruction during the invasion of 1765–67 which caused the final destruction of Ayutthaya. Before 1776, Thai chronicles recorded the available forces in the Northern cities as 15,000 men in Phitsanulok, 5,000 men in Sukhothai and 7,000 men in Sawankhalok. Nine years later in 1785, during the Nine Armies' War, these three Northern cities were so thinly-populated that they were unable to raise adequate manpower to fight the invading Burmese from the north and were evacuated. Mueang Nuea remained depopulated through the early nineteenth century into the Rattanakosin Period. In 1833, during the Siamese-Vietnamese War, only 5,000 men from Phitsanulok, 600 men from Sukhothai and 500 men from Sawankhalok were drafted into war, showing significant drop in population.

=== Postwar history ===
Alaungpaya, founder of the Burmese Konbaung dynasty, ordered that all of his sons should reign. Therefore, the succession should go in agnatic seniority among brothers. However, at the demise of Hsinbyushin in 1776, his son Singu Min ascended the throne instead of his younger brother the Prince of Amyin. Singu Min's consort was a daughter of Maha Thiha Thura himself. Upon hearing the news of the death of Hsinbyushin, Maha Thiha Thura, despite being in the middle of warfare, rushed back to Ava to secure the succession of his son-in-law. However, Singu Min then turned against his father-in-law. Singu Min deposed his queen who was the daughter of Maha Thiha Thura. Maha Thiha Thura was also demoted from his Wungyi rank. The new Burmese king exiled his former queen and her father Maha Thiha Thura to Sagaing.

In 1777, Singu Min had his uncle the Prince of Amyin executed for sedition and exiled his three other uncles Princes Badon Min, Pakan Min and Pindale Min, who were the surviving sons of Alaungpaya, to various places outside Ava. In 1782, Singu Min, along with his royal retinue, embarked on a journey to visit the Thihadaw Pagoda outside of Ava. Prince Phaungkaza Maung Maung, the son of King Naungdawgyi, took this opportunity to stage a coup and seize the throne with the absence of Singu Min. The new king Maung Maung pardoned his three uncles and allowed them to return to Ava. Maung Maung also pardoned other mandarins including Maha Thiha Thura who was restored to his Wungyi rank. Meanwhile, Singu Min was poised to march north to request aid from Qing dynasty. However, his men and retinue deserted the former Burmese king with small number of loyal servants remaining. Singu Min then decided to return to Ava to gamble with his own fate.

The new young Burmese king Maung Maung managed to take the throne but was not powerful enough to retain it. The three royal uncles, led by Prince Badon Min, decided to claim their power. After only a mere week on the throne, Maung Maung was defeated by his uncle Badon Min and executed. Badon Min took the Burmese throne as King Bodawpaya in 1782. Three days after the coup, the former king Singu Min returned to Ava and he too was executed.

Taksin was deposed and executed in a coup by one of his closest generals, Chao Phraya Chakri, in 1782, who ascended to the throne as King Rama I of the Chakri dynasty. Singu Min's successor, King Bodawpaya, sensing Siam's present state of vulnerability, decided to take advantage and launch what would become the last major Burmese invasion of Siam in 1785–86.

== See also ==
- Burmese–Siamese wars
- Burma–Thailand relations
- Taksin the Great
- Thonburi Kingdom
- Konbaung dynasty
