= Singu Min =

King of Burma

Singu Min စဉ့်ကူးမင်း
- King of Konbaung, Prince of Singu, Singu King

King of Burma
- Reign: 10 June 1776 – 6 February 1782
- Coronation: 23 December 1776
- Predecessor: Hsinbyushin
- Successor: Phaungka
- Born: Min Ye Hla; 10 May 1756; Ava (Inwa)
- Died: 14 February 1782 (aged 25); Ava
- Consort: Shin Min; 13 queens in total
- Issue: 6 sons, 6 daughters
Regnal name
- Mahādhammarājadhirāja မဟာဓမ္မရာဇာဓိရာဇာ
- House: Konbaung
- Father: Hsinbyushin
- Mother: Me Hla
- Religion: Theravada Buddhism

Singu Min (Burmese: စဉ့်ကူးမင်း, pronounced [sɪ̰ɰ̃ɡú mɪ́ɰ̃]; 10 May 1756 – 14 February 1782) was the fourth king of the Konbaung dynasty of Myanmar.

The King, who came to power amid controversy, largely put an end to his father Hsinbyushin's policy of territorial expansion, which had severely depleted the kingdom's manpower and resources. He stopped his father's latest war against Siam at his accession, effectively ceding Lan Na to the Siamese. Likewise, he took no action when the Laotian states stopped paying tribute in 1778. The only campaigns were in Manipur, where the Burmese army was forced to put down four rebellions during his reign.

The king is best remembered for the 22,952-kilogram (50,600 lb) Maha Ganda Bell, which he donated in 1779. Singu was overthrown on 6 February 1782 by his cousin Phaungka and was executed by his uncle Bodawpaya eight days later.

== Early life ==
Singu was born Min Ye Hla (မင်းရဲလှ), the eldest son to the Prince of Myedu (later King Hsinbyushin) and his first wife at the Royal Palace in Ava on 10 May 1756. When his father became king, Min Ye Hla was granted the town of Singu in fief. He became known as Singusa, or Lord of Singu, by which he would be known. He was later installed as Heir Apparent, against the wish of the founder of the dynasty, Alaungpaya.

== Accession controversy ==
Singu ascended the throne amid controversy, as his accession ignored the wish of the dynasty founder King Alaungpaya that all his sons become king. Singu's accession was made possible by the support of his father-in-law Gen. Maha Thiha Thura, the commander-in-chief of the Burmese military. (Singu's second queen, Maha Mingala Dewi, was the general's daughter.) At his succession, he assumed the regnal name "Mahadhammayazadiyaza" (မဟာဓမ္မရာဇာဓိရာဇာ; Pali: Mahādhammarājadhirāja).

At Hsinbyushin's death, Maha Thiha Thura-led Burmese forces were in their latest campaign in Siam. Concerned about his own rule at home, Singu ordered a complete withdrawal of Burmese forces from Lan Na and Upper Menam valley. The withdrawal's long-term impact was that the Burmese would lose most of the old Lan Na Kingdom, which had been under Burmese suzerainty since 1558.

== Reign ==
Singu killed off potential rivals to the throne as soon as he came to power. He had three of his half-brothers executed in 1776 upon his ascension. He next executed his uncle Prince of Amyin, the rightful heir to the throne per Alaungpaya's wish, on 1 October 1777. He exiled other possible claimants—the remaining three uncles, and two cousins. Prince of Badon (later King Bodawpaya) was next in line for the throne—hence Singu's next target—but the astute prince conducted himself so as to be seen as harmless and thereby escaped death. Prince of Badon was instead sent to Sagaing, where he was kept under close supervision.

=== Demobilization ===
Unlike his predecessors, who were all military men, Singu was anti-war in sentiment. The country had been fighting constant wars since 1740 and manpower and resources had been severely depleted. Moreover, he did not trust army commanders who were "drunk with victory" and had become warlords in the regions. Singu witnessed how the commanders openly disobeyed his father's orders when the once-fiery king was on his deathbed (1774–1776). Reflecting the people's general weariness of war, Singu largely demobilized the armies. He even had a fallout with Maha Thiha Thura and dismissed the man who had made him king, relieving the old general of all his offices, divorcing Maha Thiha Thura's daughter in May 1777, and having her drowned in 1778.

By demobilizing, he essentially decided to give up Lan Na, which had been under Burmese rule since Bayinnaung's time. Similarly, he took no action when the Laotian states of Vientiane and Luang Prabang, which had been Burmese vassals since 1765, stopped paying tribute in 1778. Nonetheless, his demobilization was well received by the war-torn country, as the people had grown tired of constant conscriptions to fight in "ever-lasting wars" in remote regions they had never heard of.

The only region in which Singu maintained military action was Manipur, where he inherited another war from his father. The former Manipuri king, whom the Burmese last drove out in 1770, made four attempts from his base in Cachar to oust the Burmese nominee between 1775 and 1782. The Burmese drove him back each time but were unable to capture him. The army gained "barren victories" and lost 20,000 men partly by fever over the years. After Singu's dethronement in 1782, the Burmese withdrew from Manipur "perhaps because the country was now so thoroughly devastated that nothing more could be wrung out of it".

=== Administration ===
He spent much of his time at the capital and in the palace, surrounding himself with young people, as he was anti-war in temperament. There, he listened to music and poetry and spent his nights in drunken bouts in a hideout across the river. He executed or dismissed those courtiers who criticized his conduct.

== Dethronement and death ==
On 6 February 1782, one of the exiled cousins, Prince of Phaungka, came back to Ava, deposed Singu and declared himself to be king. Phaungka's reign was, however, very short, as their uncle Prince of Badon organized a coup one week later, killed both Singu and Phaungka, and became King—later known as King Bodawpaya.

== Notes ==
Singu Min Konbaung Dynasty Born: 10 May 1756 Died: 14 February 1782
Regnal titles
Preceded by Hsinbyushin	King of Burma; 10 June 1776 – 5 February 1782	Succeeded by Phaungkaza Maung Maung
Royal titles
Preceded by Hsinbyushin	Heir to the Burmese Throne as Prince of Singu; 177?–1776	Succeeded by Thado Minsaw
