= Maha Nawrahta =

Burmese general

- Born: Mu valley, Kingdom of Myanmar
- Died: March 1767; Outside Ayutthaya, Siam
- Military career
- Allegiance: Konbaung dynasty
- Branch: Royal Burmese Army
- Service years: 1752–1767
- Rank: Joint commander-in-chief
- Commands: Southern Command (1765–1767)
- Conflicts: Konbaung-Hanthawaddy War (1752–1757); Burmese–Siamese War (1759–1760); Burmese–Siamese War (1765–1767)

Gen. Maha Nawrahta (Burmese: မဟာနော်ရထာ, pronounced [məhà nɔ̀jətʰà], called Mang Maha Noratha by Damrong Rajanubhab; d. March 1767) was joint commander-in-chief of the Royal Burmese Army from 1765 to 1767. The general is best known for commanding the southern invasion force in the Burmese invasion of Siam (1765–1767). He and Ne Myo Thihapate jointly commanded the 14-month-long siege of Ayutthaya, the capital of Siam. He died just a few weeks before the Burmese armies succeeded. He was buried with extraordinary honors by royal decree.
