= Wat Suthiwararam School =

- โรงเรียนวัดสุทธิวราราม
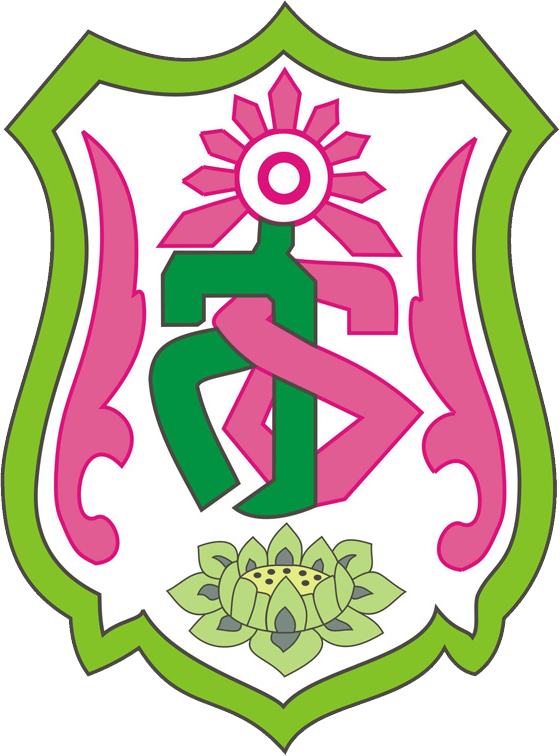

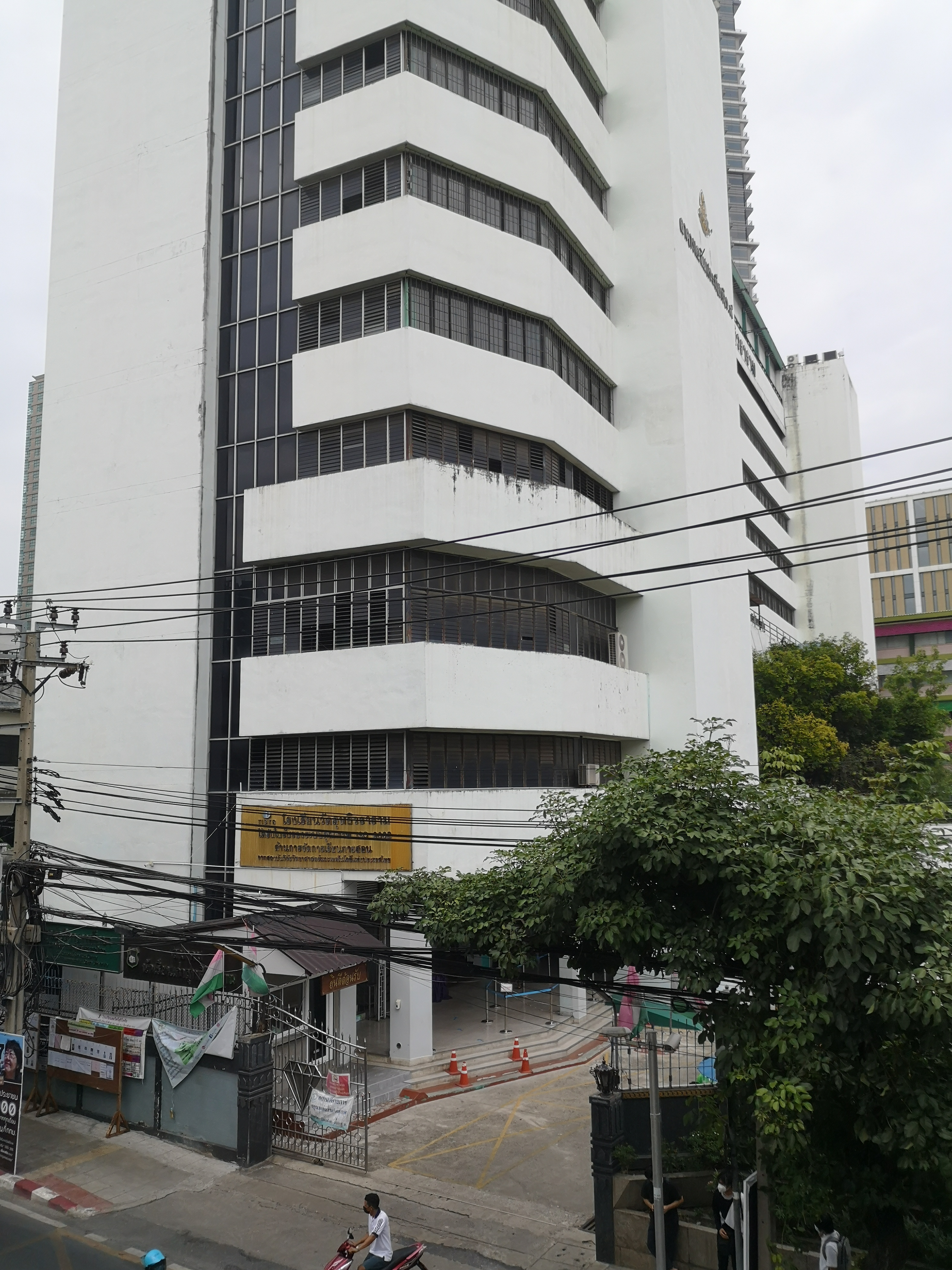

Location
- Bangkok; Thailand; 13°42′44.63″N 100°30′43.89″E

Information
- Type: Public secondary school
- Motto: Pali: วิชฺชา วรํ ธนํ โหติ (Thai Script); Pali: Vijjā Varaṃ Dhanaṃ Hoti (Roman Script) (Knowledge is the superb asset.)
- Established: July 3, 1911
- Locale: 252 Charoen Krung Road, Yannawa, Sathon District, Bangkok, 10120, Thailand
- School board: The Secondary Educational Service Area Office 2
- School district: The Secondary Educational Service Area 2
- Authority: Office of the Basic Education Commission
- Oversight: Ministry of Education
- Director: Sunanthawit Phloi-khao
- Faculty: 192
- Grades: 7–12 (Mathayom 1–6)
- Gender: Boys' School
- Age range: 12–19
- Enrollment: 3,520 (2011 academic year)
- Language: Thai, English, Chinese and French
- Classrooms: 72
- Campus size: approx. 2.25 acres
- Campus type: urban
- Colours: Pink, White and Green
- Mascot: Lotus and Diamond
- Nickname: สิงห์สะพานปลา (Lion of Fish Market)
- Website: www.suthi.ac.th

Wat Suthiwararam School (Thai: โรงเรียนวัดสุทธิวราราม; RTGS: Rongrian Wat Suthi Wararam, IPA: [rōːŋrīːən wát su.tʰi.wáʔraːraːm]) or, in brief, ST (Thai: ส.ธ.) is a state all-boys school in Sathon, Bangkok, Thailand, for Matthayom 1 through 6. It was named by King Vajiravudh and established on July 3, 1911. The School's area holds 5 rai, 2 ngan, 320 square metres (approx. 2.25 acres).

== History ==
Wat Suthiwararam School was established in 1911 and became the first school founded by the commoner and contributed to the public service in the reign of King Vajiravudh, the school was initially named Wat Suthiwararam especial high school.

In 1917, Wat Suthiwararam School the system was changed from the old school move to the Western. This school was for girls and name is Satri Si Suriyothai School. In 1989, the school created a Buddha statue name Luang Por Suthi Mongkolchai (Thai: หลวงพ่อสุทธิมงคลชัย)

In the present day, Wat Suthiwararam School was only for boys and secondary education about Mattayom 1 through 6. The school grounds are about 3 acres. It has 6 buildings and 72 rooms. The colors of the school are pink, white and green. A Lotus and diamonds are the symbol of the school.

== Garuda royal scepter ==
In 1964 King Bhumibol Adulyadej have the royal remarks with Wat Suthiwararam 's marching band so good.

== Honours ==
The school has received several awards, for example, Wat Suthiwararam 's marching band was the winner of 1999 World Championship for Marching Show Bands in Sydney, Australia and received the Champion highest score in Drum corps band category, Open, First division. Several Students participated and awarded in International Science Olympiads as follows

- Ohmmarin Sathusen, Participated in 30th International Physics Olympiad - Padova, Italy 1999.
- Theerachai Chaitassanee, Participated in 30th International Physics Olympiad - Padova, Italy 1999.
- Wittaya Kanchanapoosakit, Awarded honorable mentions in 31st International Physics Olympiad - Leicester, United Kingdom 2000.
- Prasert Sinsermsuksakul, Awarded gold medal in 33rd International Chemistry Olympiad - Mumbai, India 2001. The first gold medal of Thailand.
- Thiti Taychatanapat, Awarded honorable mentions in 32nd International Physics Olympiad - Antalya, Turkey 2001. Awarded Bronze Medal and Honorable mentions in 2nd Asian Physics Olympiad - Taipei, Taiwan 2001.
- Monsit Tanasittikosol, Participated in 33rd International Physics Olympiad - Bali, Indonesia 2002. Awarded Honorable mentions in 3rd Asian Physics Olympiad - Singapore 2002.
- Neti Sunsandee, Awarded bronze medal in 36th International Chemistry Olympiad - Kiel, Germany 2004.
- Ake Lerttriluck, Participated in 6th Asian Physics Olympiad - Pekanbaru, Indonesia2005.
- Supamongkol Matchamee, Awarded silver medal in 37th International Chemistry Olympiad - Taipei, Taiwan 2005. Highest score of grade 11 in Australian National Chemistry Quiz.
- Thanakorn Iamsasri, Participated in 7th Asian Physics Olympiad - Almaty, Kazakhstan 2006.
- Pisit Nitiyanant, Awarded III Diploma and the best result among participants of new participating in APAO countries in 2nd Asian-Pacific Astronomy Olympiad - Vladivostok, Russia 2006.
- Sermsuk Thanabanjerdsin, Participated in 2nd Asian-Pacific Astronomy Olympiad - Vladivostok, Russia 2006.

== Notable alumni ==
- Don Pramudwinai (Minister of Foreign Affairs, Thai ambassador to Switzerland, China, North Korea, Mongolia, Belgium, Luxembourg, the European Union, the United Nations, and the United States)
- Wiroj Lakkhanaadisorn (Politician)
- Suttinan Phuk-hom (National football Team player)
- Patiparn Phetphun (National football Team player)
- Choketawee Promrut (National football Team player)
- Hatthaporn Suwan (National football Team player)
- Bordin Phala (National football Team player)
- Kiattisak Udomnak (Thai actor and comedian)
- Pakin Kunaanuwit (Thai actor and former badminton player)

== Nearby schools ==
- Satri Si Suriyothai School
- Shrewsbury International School
- Assumption College
- Assumption Convent
- Assumption Suksa School
- Bangkok Christian College
