= Chan Road =

Road and neighbourhood in Bangkok, Thailand

Coordinates: 13°42′24.13″N 100°31′37.09″E

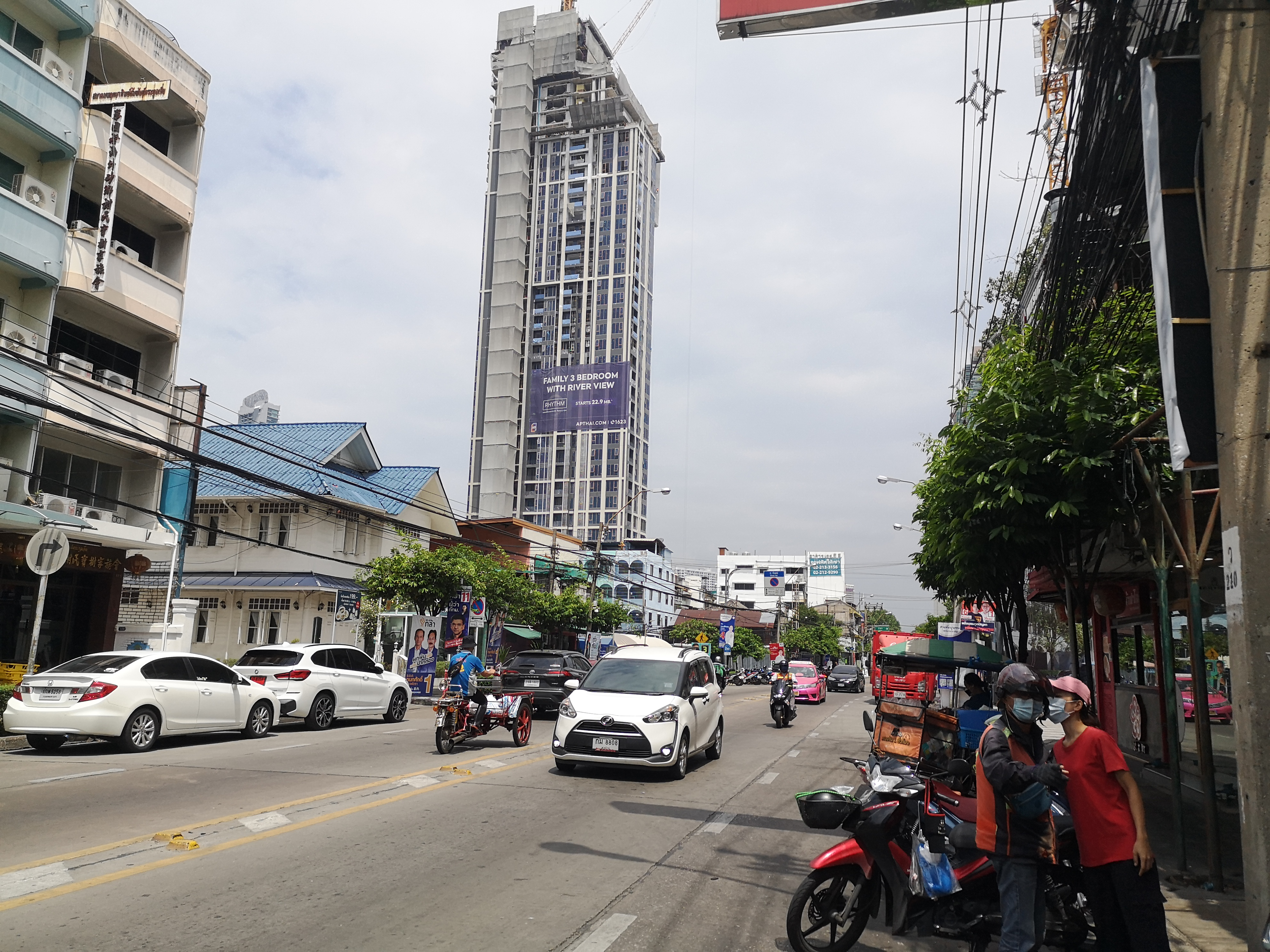
Chan Road in mid-2022

Chan Road (Thai: ถนนจันทน์, RTGS: Thanon Chan, pronounced [tʰā.nǒn t͡ɕān]; lit. 'sandalwood road'), also known as Trok Chan (Thai: ตรอกจันทน์, pronounced [trɔ̀ːk t͡ɕān]; lit. 'sandalwood alley'), is a road and neighbourhood in Bangkok. It's a separate from Nang Linchi road in the area of Thung Maha Mek sub-district, Sathon district and runs through Chan–Naradhiwas intersection where it cuts across Naradhiwas Rajanagarindra road. In this phase, it also acts as a line between Sathon district's Thung Wat Don and Yan Nawa district's Chong Nonsi sub-district, then through two more intersections were Tai Duan Chan junction and Sathu–Chan junction as far as end at Trok Chan junction, where it combined with Charoen Krung road in the area of Wat Phraya Krai sub-district, Bang Kho Laem district, total distance is 7.0 km (4.3 mi). At the end of the road on Charoen Krung side is close to two historic sites are Asiatique The Riverfront, originally, it was the location of the Danish maritime navigation company East Asiatic Company and Protestant Cemetery, include another place of education is Shrewsbury International School.

This road is an expanse of Charoen Krung and Yaowarat neighbourhoods. It's the residence of Chinese businessmen who moved into this area especially in the post-1957 era and mix with Thais and Muslims, the people who lived before.

Nowadays, Chan road is considered to be a suitable development area for investment and housing. It's close to the prominent business districts of Bangkok, Silom and Sathon roads and also close to other public facilities such as various restaurants and cafés, CentralPlaza Rama III, Assumption College and Assumption Cathedral, Bangkok Christian College or BTS and BRT stations etc.
