= Wat Yannawa =

Buddhist temple in Bangkok, Thailand

- วัดยานนาวา
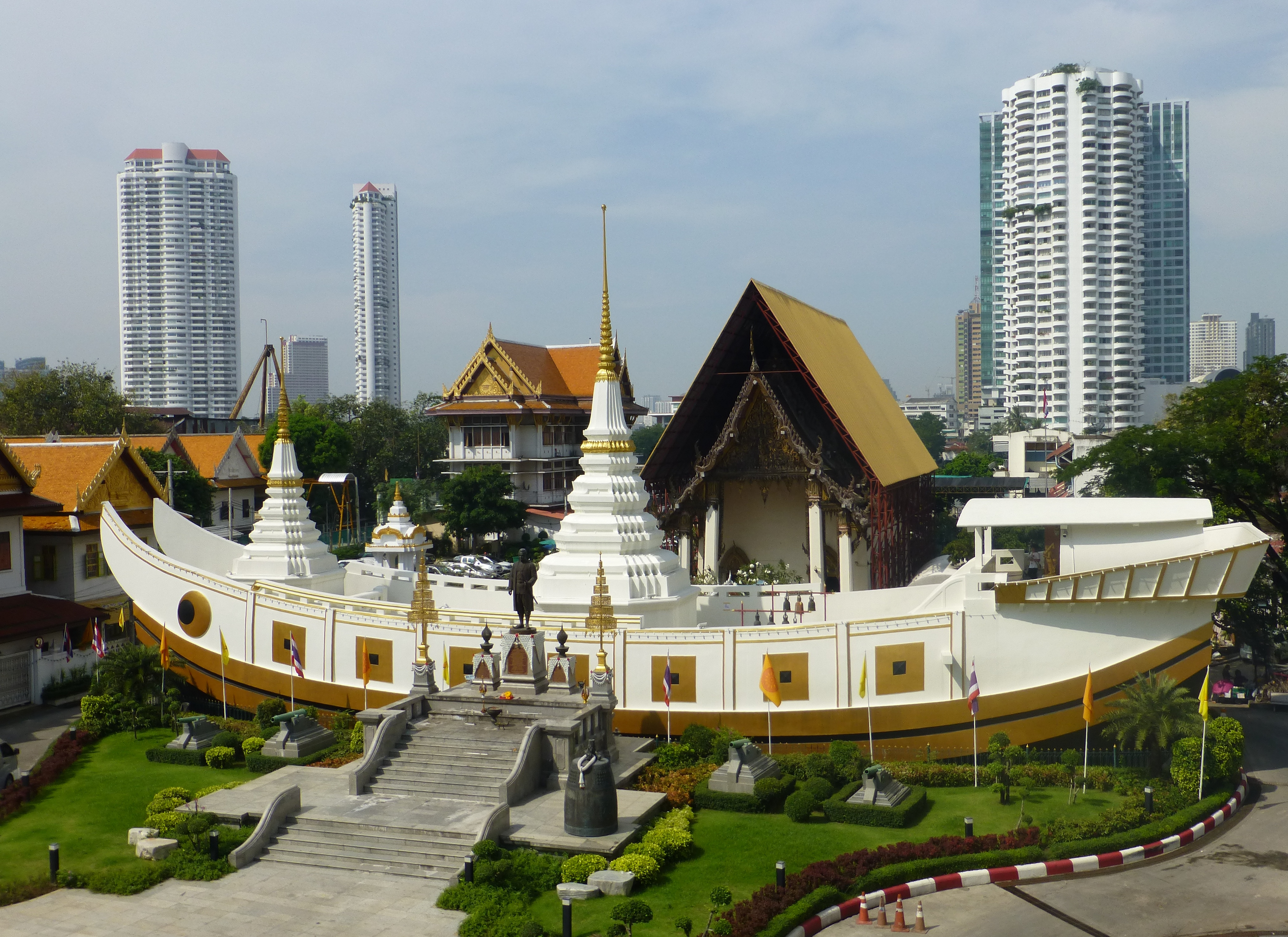
- Chinese Junk Chedi (Phra Samphao Chedi) of Wat Yannawa

- Location within Bangkok

Religion
- Affiliation: Theravada Buddhism

Location
- Location: Charoen Krung road Khwaeng Yannawa, Khet Sathorn, Bangkok, Thailand
- Country: Thailand
- Interactive map of Wat Yannawa
- Coordinates: 13.7173°N 100.5136°E

Wat Yannawa (Thai: วัดยานนาวา), commonly known in English as "the boat temple", is a Buddhist temple (Wat) in Bangkok on Charoen Krung Road, Sathon district. The temple has a long history from the Ayutthaya era to the present. During the rule of King Rama III, a viharn was built in the shape of a Chinese junk, giving the temple the nickname "the boat temple". This construction inside the temple houses a space where people pray; a nearby ubosot enshrines Buddha images and illustrations of the Loi Prathip Royal Lantern Festival. Additional exterior buildings enshrine a Buddha relic from Sri Lanka and the Goddess of Mercy.

== History ==
The temple was built during the Ayutthaya Kingdom, before the founding of Bangkok. It was originally called Wat Kok Khwai (วัดคอกควาย) because the community of Dawei people in the area bought and sold buffalo; later, it was renamed as Wat Kok Krabue (วัดคอกกระบือ).

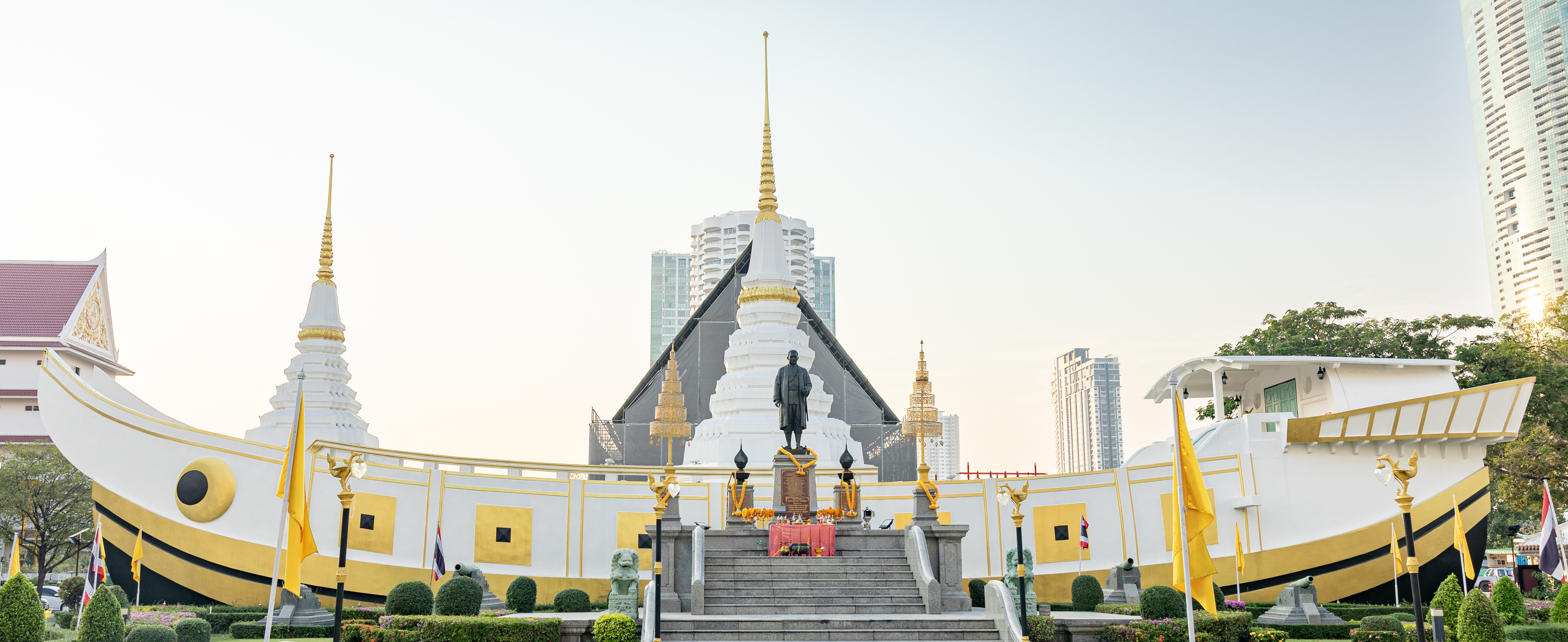
The Chinese junk with chedis

During the reigh of King Rama I, the temple gained royal status and the ubosot was built. During the reign of King Rama III, a viharn was built in the shape of a Chinese junk. The temple was renamed as Wat Yannawa, which translates as "the boat temple". The two chedis on the deck represent masts and the altar at the back represents the wheelhouse. Because of this unique structure, locals call the temple “sampao chedi” ("the Chinese junk with chedis"). King Rama III chose the shape of a junk as a means of historical preservation; he believed the junk was becoming obsolete due to new ship types, and wanted to preserve its image.

== Interior ==
The "stern" of the ship enshrines four Buddha statues and replica footprints, including Thai and Chinese inscriptions. The larger chedi has 20 wooden recesses, while the smaller one has 16. There is also a room dedicated to relics, which some believe to come from Buddha. The ubosot enshrines the principle of subduing Mara Buddha image and includes other buddha images. Interestingly, on the doors and windows are painted images of a yaku jar (โถยาคู), a jar used for offerings in a royal ceremony. On the upper part of the door and back of the room is drawn a big Krathong (กระทง) in the style of used in the Loi Prathip Royal Lantern Festival (พระราชพิธีลอยพระประทีป). This kind of picture, at this size, is rare in Thailand.

== Exterior ==
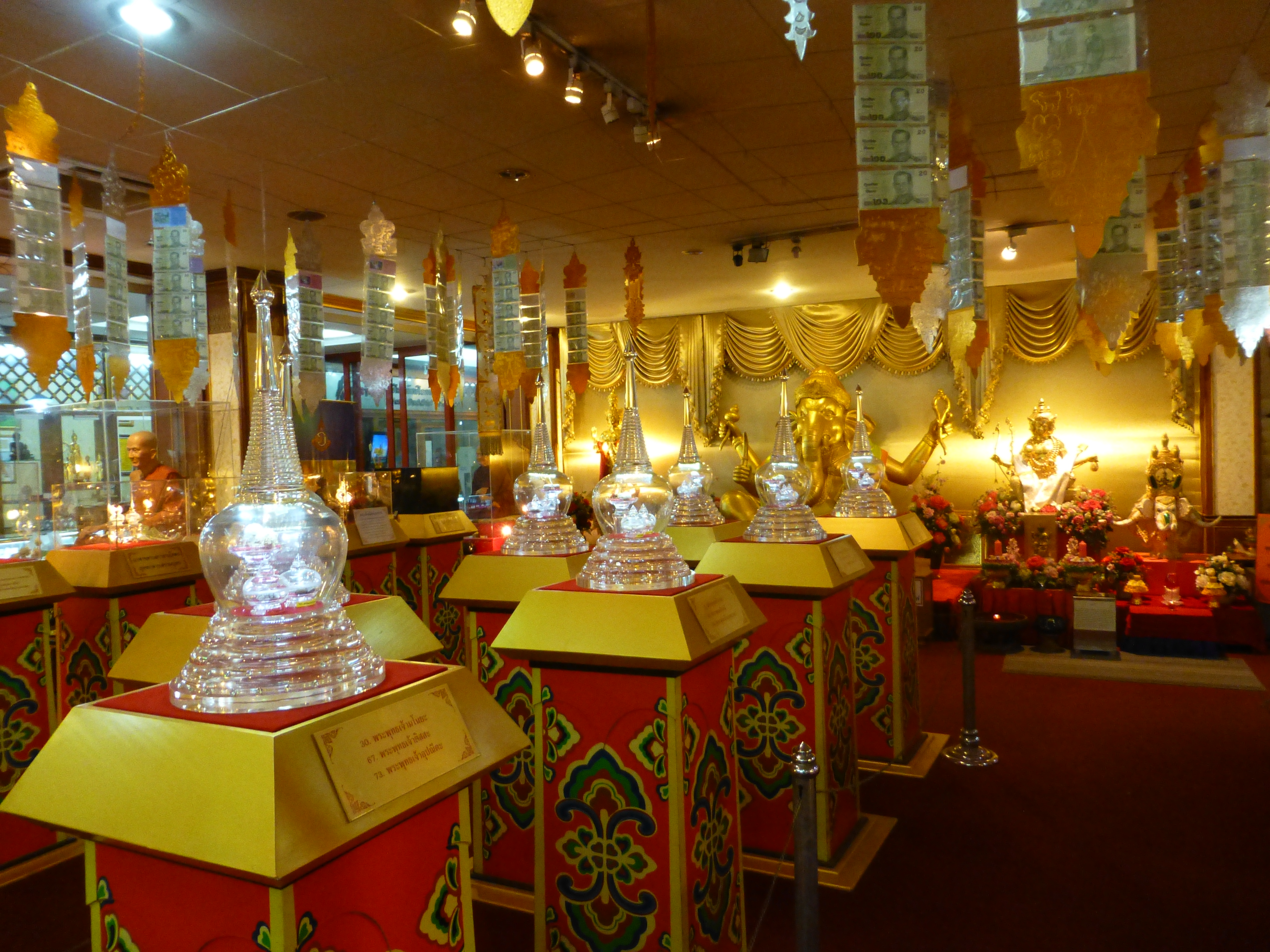
Relic from Sri Lanka

Three statues of the Goddess of Mercy are enshrined in a separate, Chinese-style temple, and a building enshrines a Buddha relic from Sri Lanka.

== Gallery ==
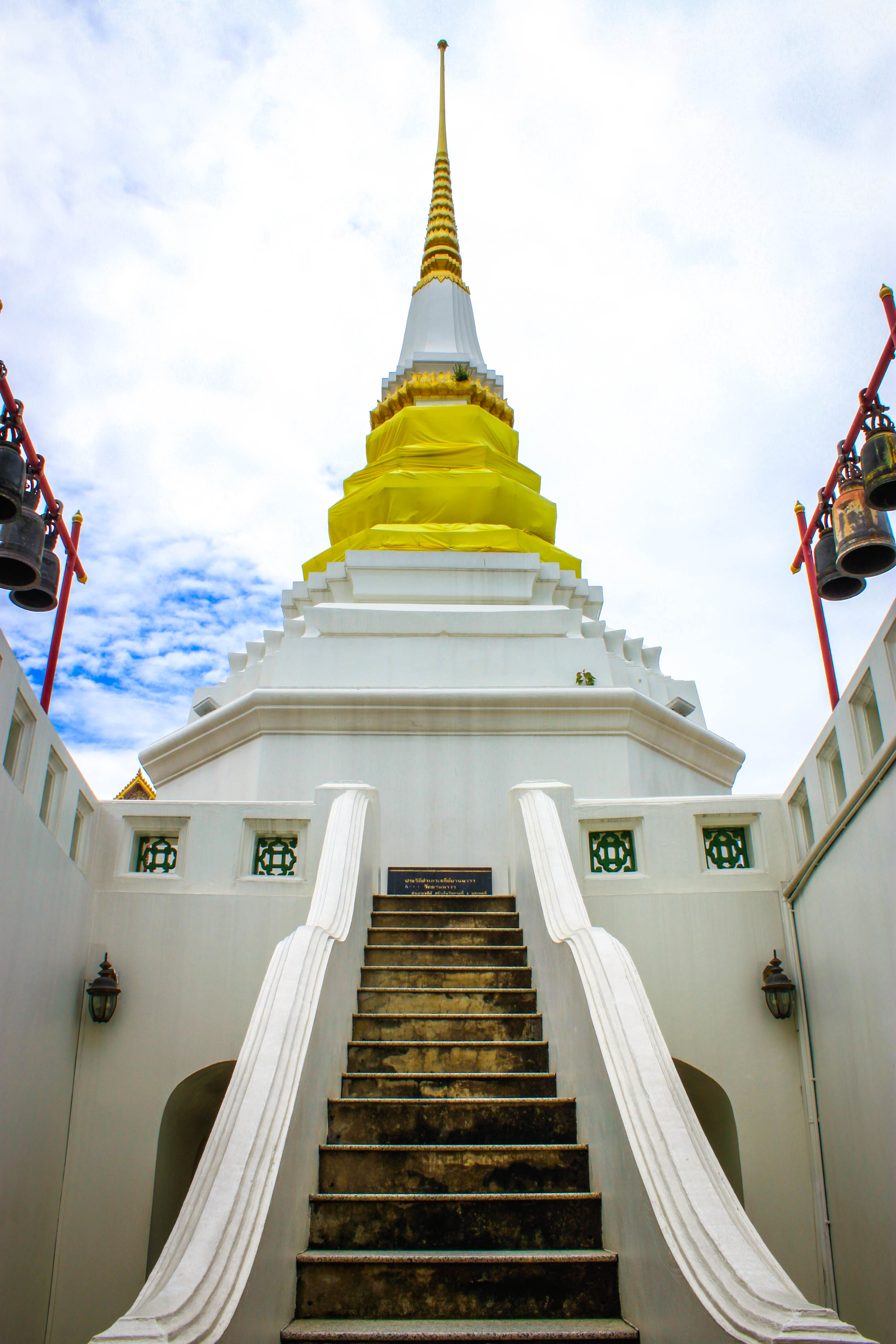
One of the minor chedis on the junk

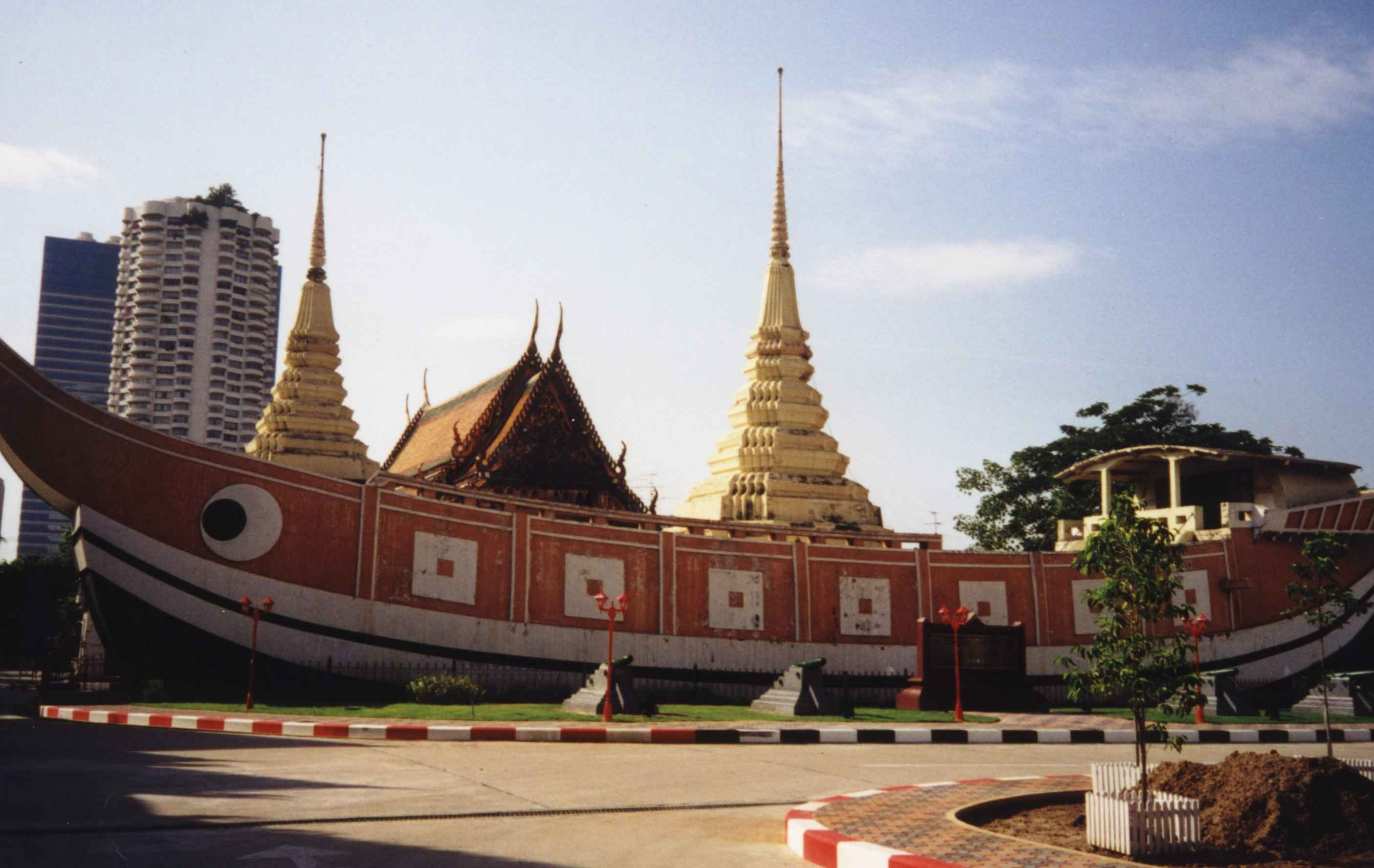
Wat Yannawa before a major renovation

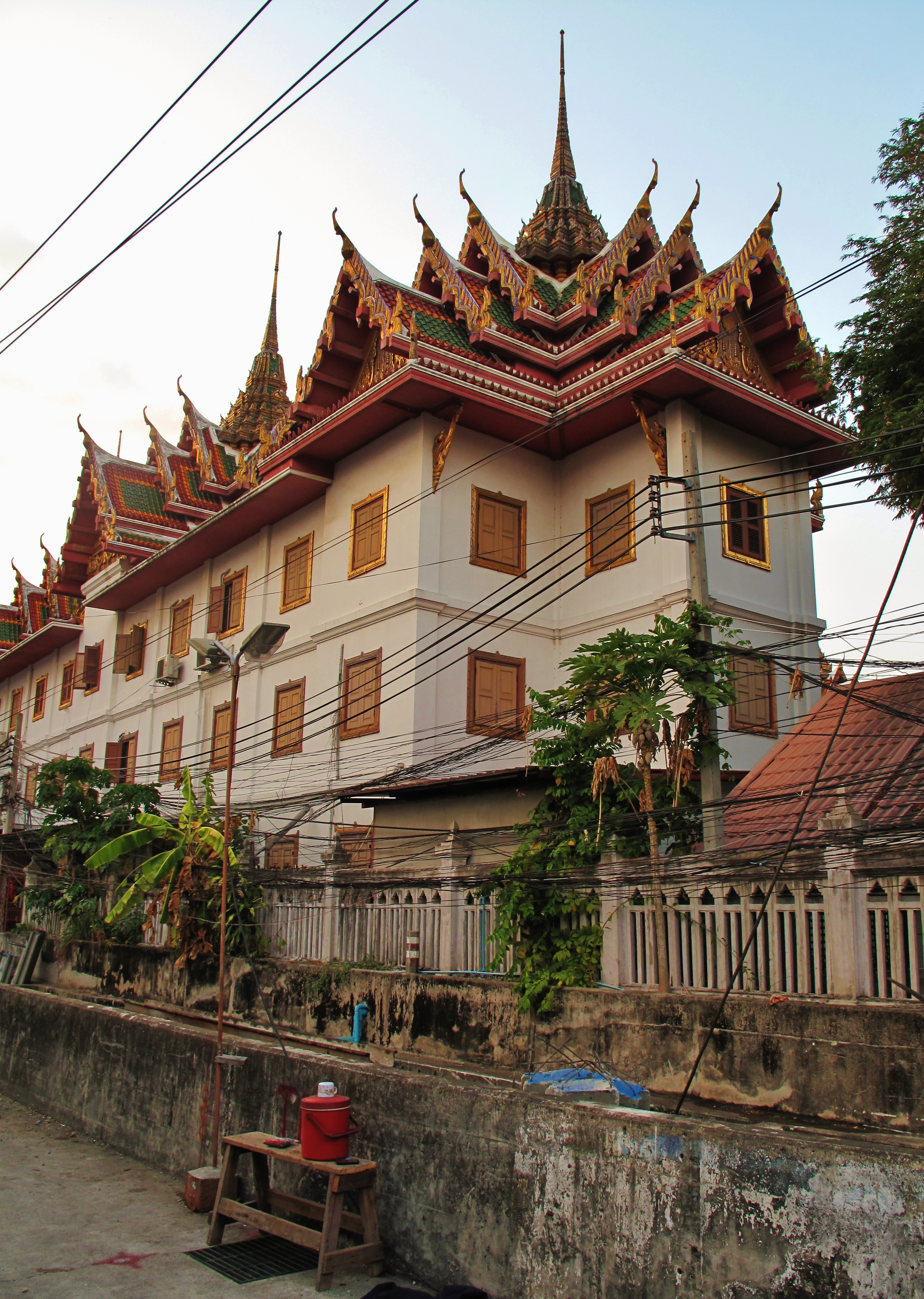
Wat Yannawa museum building

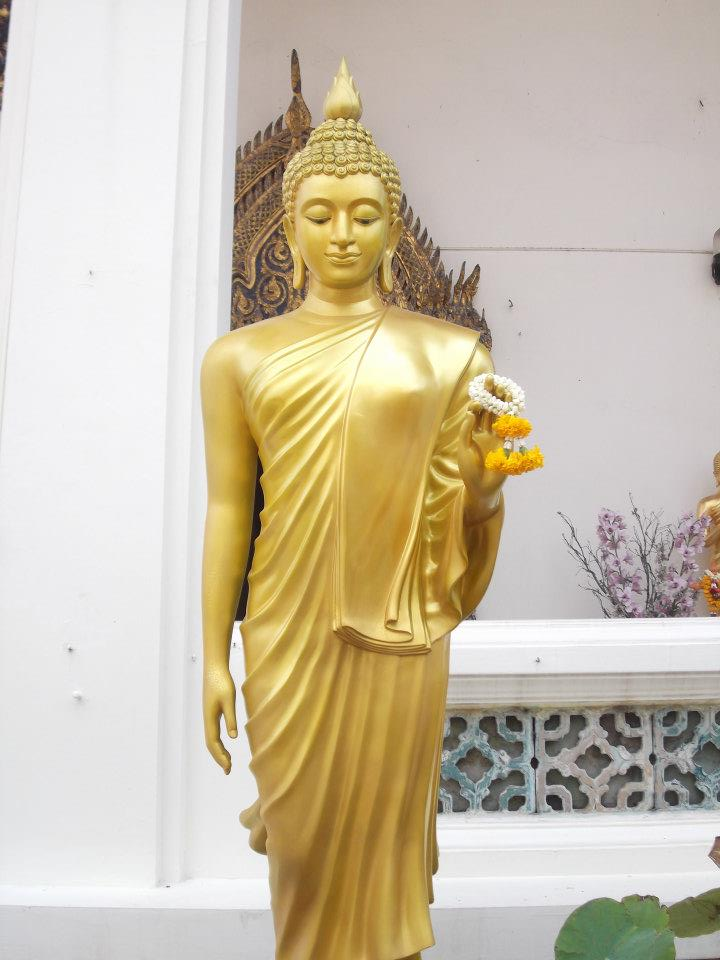
Walking Buddha statue

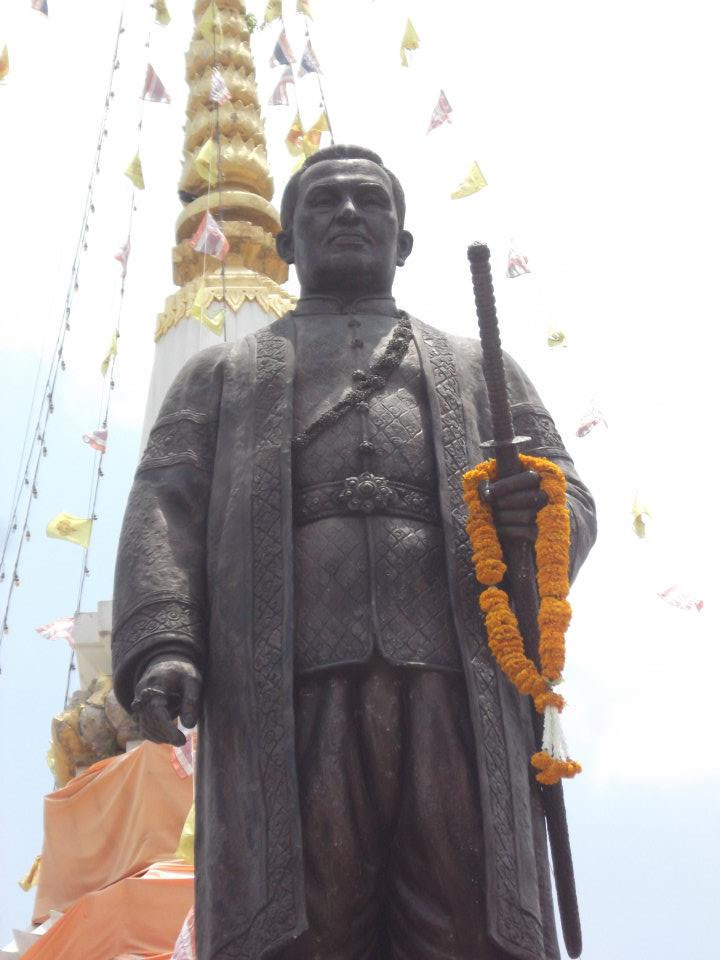
King Rama III sculpture standing in front of a chedi

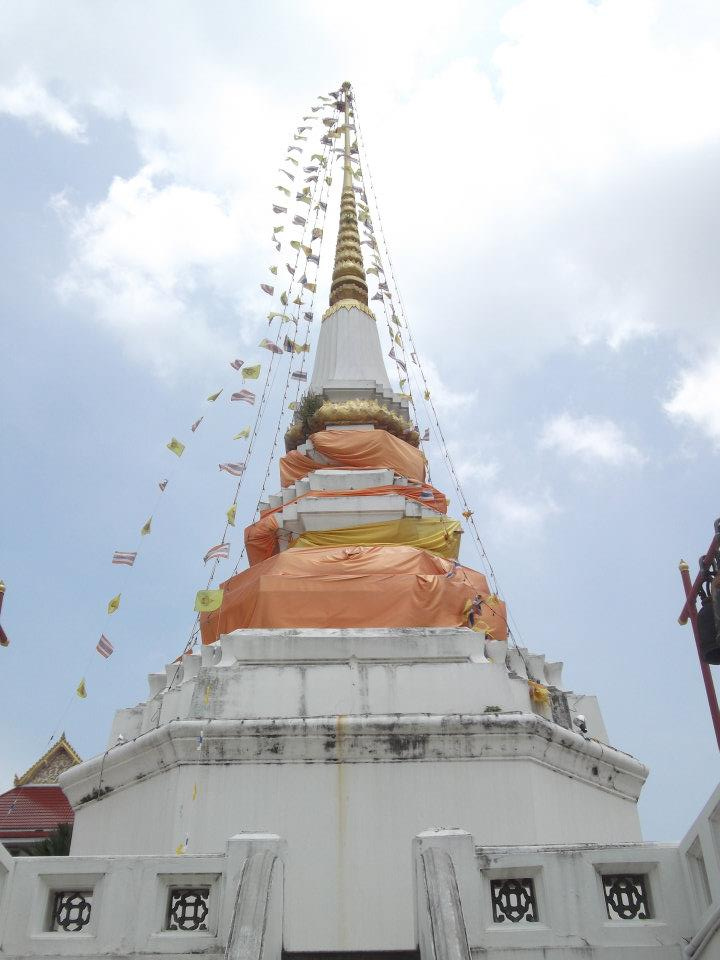
Another minor chedi on the junk, decorated with flags

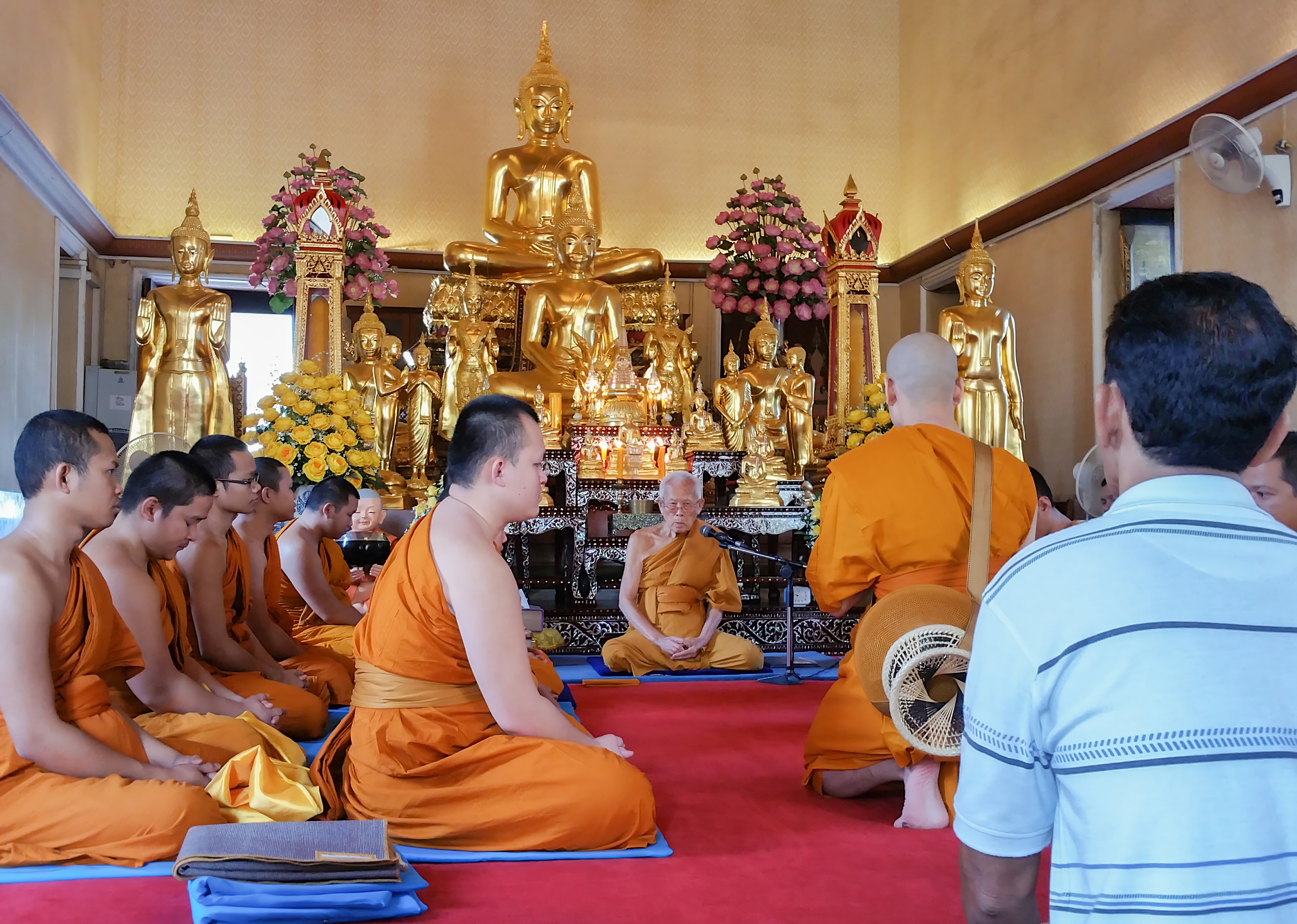
The ordination of a novice (sāmaṇera) at Wat Yannawa

== See also ==
- Buddhist temples in Thailand
- Architecture of Thailand
- Thai temple art and architecture
- Knowing Buddha
- List of Buddhist temples
