= Chaloem Phrakiat Park =

Park in Bangkok, Thailand

Coordinates: 13.7186°N 100.5426°E

80th Birthday Anniversary of His Majesty the King Park
- สวนเฉลิมพระเกียรติ 80 พรรษา พระบาทสมเด็จพระจ้าอยู่หัว
- Type: Public park
- Location: Sathon, Bangkok, Thailand
- Area: 28,000 m^{2} (18 rai)
- Opened: 2007

Chaloem Phrakiat 80th Anniversary Park (Thai: สวนเฉลิมพระเกียรติ 80 พรรษา พระบาทสมเด็จพระจ้าอยู่หัว), also known as 80th Birthday Anniversary of His Majesty the King Park or Bang Khun Non Park, is a park in Sathorn, Bangkok, Thailand.

== History ==
The park was established on 5 December 2007 in honor of the 80th birthday of King Bhumibol Adulyadej.

The park underwent a major renovation and reopened in February 2026.
