= Poh Teck Tung Foundation =

Thai Chinese charitable foundation

Coordinates: 13°44′39.9″N 100°30′38.7″E

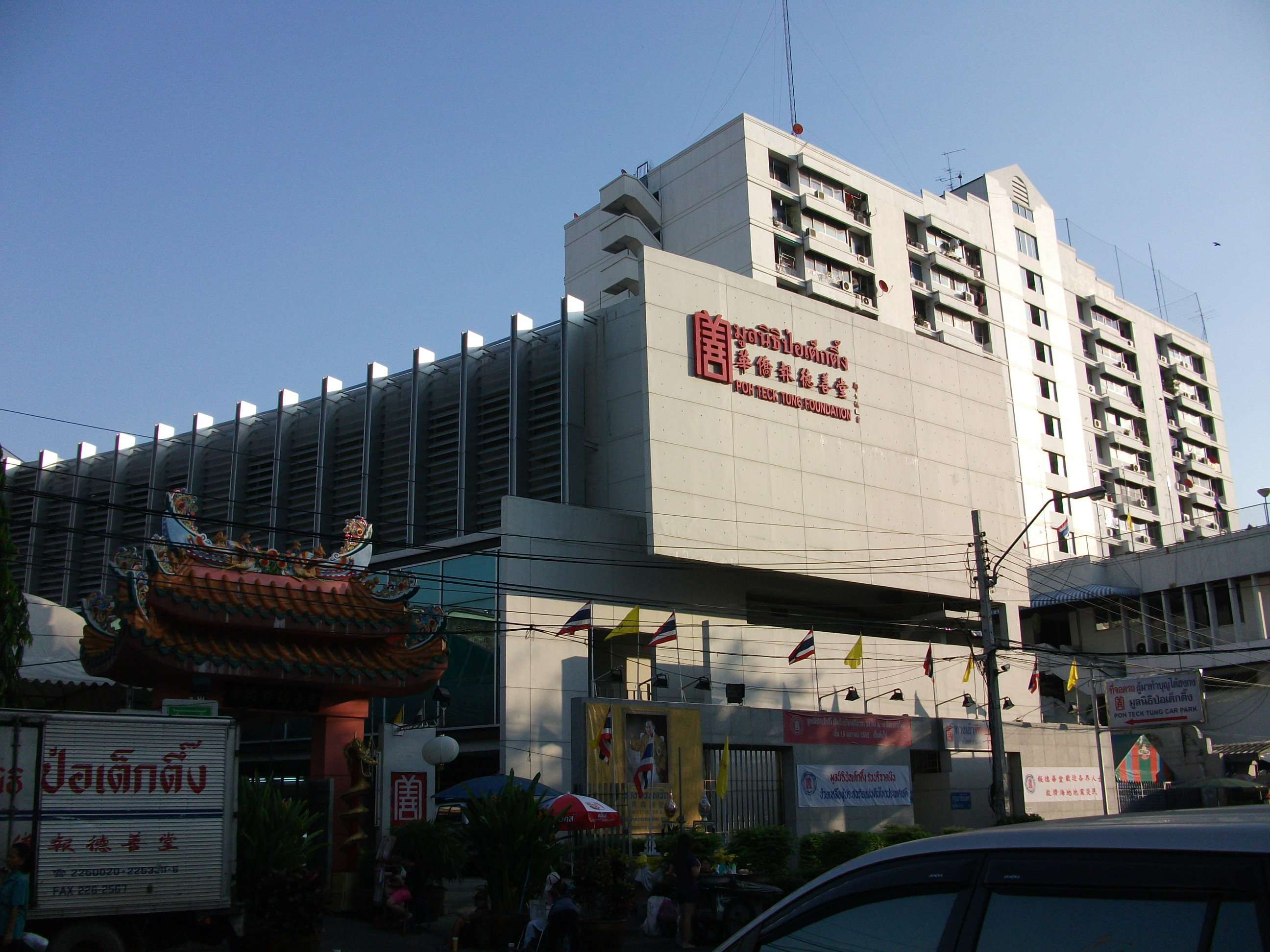
Poh Teck Tung Foundation Headquarters

The Poh Teck Tung Foundation (Thai: มูลนิธิป่อเต็กตึ๊ง, from Chinese: 華僑報德善堂; pinyin: Huáqiáo Bàodé shàntáng) is a rescue foundation founded in Thailand famously known for rescuing road accident victims and managing unclaimed corpses with proper burials. The foundation originated a hundred years ago in Thailand concerning Chinese's traditional religious beliefs that based on committing good deeds as a principle of action.

Initially started from twelve Chinese merchants who came to Thailand in 1909 called Taihonkon. They were corpse managing parties to take care of the unclaimed corpses. These corpses were buried at Wat Don Cemetery, Thanon Charoen Krung road, which they acquired the property by soliciting the fund together and bought it. Succeeding in 1938 with the collaboration of Chinese businessmen and association of publishers, they reformed it by registering the party as an official foundation, with the fund of two thousand baht. It was registered as Huakeawpohtecksengtung (Huáqiáo Bàodé shàntáng), becoming the 11th foundation formed in Thailand.

In the 1990s, its volunteers' early presence at the site of accidents led government to incorporate them into Thailand's developing emergency medical service system. The foundation's volunteers, along with similar other groups, now receive rudimentary training and are dispatched as first responders in the majority of accidents. Presently not only managing the unclaimed corpses Por Teck Tung foundation has been doing public welfare such as assisting and bringing relief to any kind of disaster including famine and poverty. With the collaboration of Hua Chiew Hospital, they also provide medical services to accommodate the victim. The foundation has expanded their objective in extensive education and established higher education institutions under the royal given name of Huachiew Chalermprakiet University.

The foundation operates throughout day and night, providing the first responder to support the incident as quickly as possible including having the hotlines to notify the incident. A citizen can volunteer and participate in the training course. The foundation also accepts donations for several purposes and organizes events for charity and religious belief.

== History ==
About nine hundred years ago, China in the era of royal Chong. There was a member of a high-class family name Limp who passed a high-rank test and entered government service in the tier of Senju. After entering the service of government he was promoted to the prefect of Chewheng in Jijgung province. Not long in serving, he left the title to become a Buddhist monk and had an alias name "Tai Hong Zhou Sue" (大峰祖師) or "Tai Hong Kong". In Thai named is Reverend Grandfather Tai Hong.

He traveled to Hokkien province and stays at Mien An Temple, Chaozhou Region, which was a dilapidated temple located on Pashua mountain in Tia Eie District. When he stayed there he tried to build and reconstruct the temple while doing religious practice, spread morality, doing community services. With diligence, his good deed has been noticed, a lot of people start respecting him and offer themselves to become an apprentice. One of the specific important events that made people recognize him was when an epidemic occurred causing significant people to their death, Tai Hong Kong with his followers came to relieve the situation. He and his follower collected the unclaimed corpses to buried, giving away medicine until the critical moment has passed. The reputation of his achieving has spread across China, Chinese people respect him and admire him as one of the great monks. When he died, the villager and devotee united to build a pavilion as a memorial enshrined and gave the name "Poh Teck Tung" as a name to memorial him. Later Chinese devotee who came to Thailand, built a shrine to pay homage.

Twelve Chinese merchants who came to Thailand in 1909 called Taihonkon. They admired the importance and benefits of the charitable intent of the believers so they acquired the property by soliciting the fund together and bought it for a follower. The place has been used to pay homage, give away medicine, Help the victims, keep the corpse without a relative, etc. These corpses were buried at Wat Don Cemetery, Thanon Charoen Krung road. After eventually doing public welfare for four years, the party was insufficient in funding. However, at the time, Royal King Rama VI has noticed their effort and impact of their working; thus, he bestowed the royal money in the amount of two thousand baths to the party. Succeeding in 1938 with the collaboration of Chinese businessmen and association of publishers, they reformed it by registering the party as an official foundation, with the fund of two thousand baht. It was registered as Huakeawpohtecksengtung (Huáqiáo Bàodé shàntáng), becoming the 11th foundation formed in Thailand.

In the 1990s, its volunteers' early presence at the site of accidents led government to incorporate them into Thailand's developing emergency medical service system. The foundation's volunteers, along with similar other groups, now receive rudimentary training and are dispatched as first responders in the majority of accidents. Poh Teck Tung also operates Hua Chiew Hospital and Huachiew Chalermprakiet University.

== Activity ==
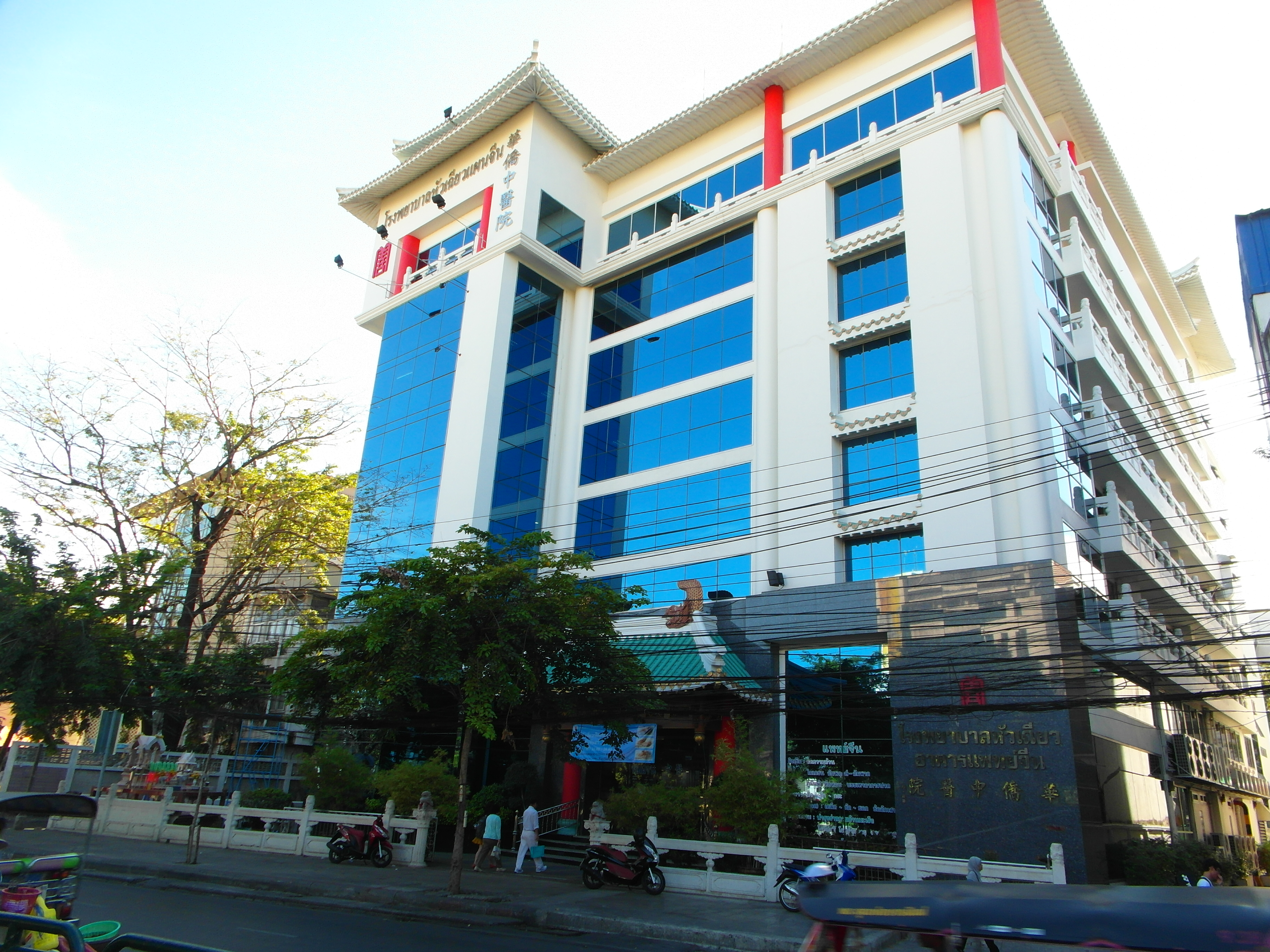
Hua Chiew hospital

Poh Teck Tung foundation is an active foundation not only responding to situational incidence but also opens for a volunteer training course.

Poh Teck Tung foundation has a volunteer training course separated into five major categories, First aid course, Rescuers course, Rescue Course, Advanced Rescue Course, Communication course.

Each category contains a sub-training course. A citizen can apply for a volunteer training course through the main official website Poh-Teck-Tung.

=== First aid course ===
-First aid and basic resurrection

-Basic first aid

-First aid and CPR, AED

-Heart saver

-Community emergency

-Basic resuscitation and use of an

Automated external defibrillator

=== Rescuers course ===
-Basic CPR and AED

-First Responder / FR

-Emergency Medical Response / EMR

-EMR Refresh

-Emergency Medical Technician-Basic/EMT-B

-Emergency Medical Technician-Basic/EMT-B

-Emergency Medical Technician Intermediate / EMT-I

-Advanced Emergency Medical Technician / AEMT

-Emergency Medical Technician-Paramedic / EMT-P

-Paramedic Nurse

-EMS Nurse

-Prehospital Nurse

-Prehospital Emergency Nurse/PHEN

-Advanced Trauma Life Support/ATLS

-Doctor

-MERT

-The ambulance driver and safe driving

-Integration of emergency assistance at the point of accident

=== Rescue Course ===
-Basic knowledge of disaster management in Thailand

-Basic Rescue Course / BRC

-Basic Forensic Science Course and Witness Material Treatment at the Scene

-Developing management for officers

=== Advanced Rescue Course ===
-Advanced Rescue Course / ARC

-Marine Rescue

-Life-Saving and Water Rescue

-Maritime And Aquatic Life Support/M.A.L.S.

-Basic fire fighting

-Intermediate fire fighting

-Advanced fire fighting

-Rescuing in confined spaces

-Rescue Techniques for Landslides, Earthquakes, and Ruins

-Incident command system (ICS.)

-Search and rescue

-Emergency Response team/ERT

-Air transportation for patients

-Basic knowledge of chemical management (Hazmat)

-DMAT

=== Communication course ===
-Communication Course for Emergency Operations Supervisors

-Emergency operations coordinator

-Staff notified of emergency illnesses

-Basic amateur radio staff

-Radio synthesizer frequency type 1

-Radio synthesizer frequency type 2

== Event ==
The foundation often organizes events involving charity, religious ceremonies, or seasonal Chinese ceremonies.

Foundation occasionally provides news about the event on their official website. The news includes cultural, spiritual events, ritual events, donation events, social services, and scholarship that the foundation had been giving

== Donation ==
A citizen can donate for several purposes though several medium managing by the foundation.

Foundation sincerely invites a devotee citizen to donate money, unwanted things, food to help the underprivileged, disadvantaged, and those in need.

The donated item and money will help in various areas such as

-Victims of disasters such as floods, storms, fires, etc.

-Those who lack cold clothing.

-Funeral for the dead in an accident.

-Medical services such as medical help at Hua Chiew Hospital/

Hospitals and public health centers/Establish a community welfare medical unit. Medical examination and medication dispensing free of charge nationwide/Establish medical rescuers for accident victims at both basic and advanced levels.

-Work for the elderly.

-Scholarships at all levels.

-Child and youth welfare, such as handing out notebooks on National Children's Day/school uniforms/scholarships, school lunch, etc.

-Support and preserve religion on various occasions, for example, to host a Kathina annual royal offering / establishing a kitchen for Buddhist and other religious events.

Those who donate to the foundation every year or every month Sponsor department Will go to receive donations with a leader or a committee of a local foundation or association taking the donation to prevent impersonation. There is no policy to send an official to go alone and collect money. If you notice an impersonator or suspicious person who claims to be a foundation officer Please notify the Foundation immediately.

== Notification ==
There are many ways to notify an incident, including hotline and mobile application.

The foundation has an official twitter and facebook account by the name of the foundation.

A citizen can notify an incident by Hotline 1418 (Thailand).
