= Yan Nawa subdistrict =

Yan Nawa ยานนาวา
- Subdistrict
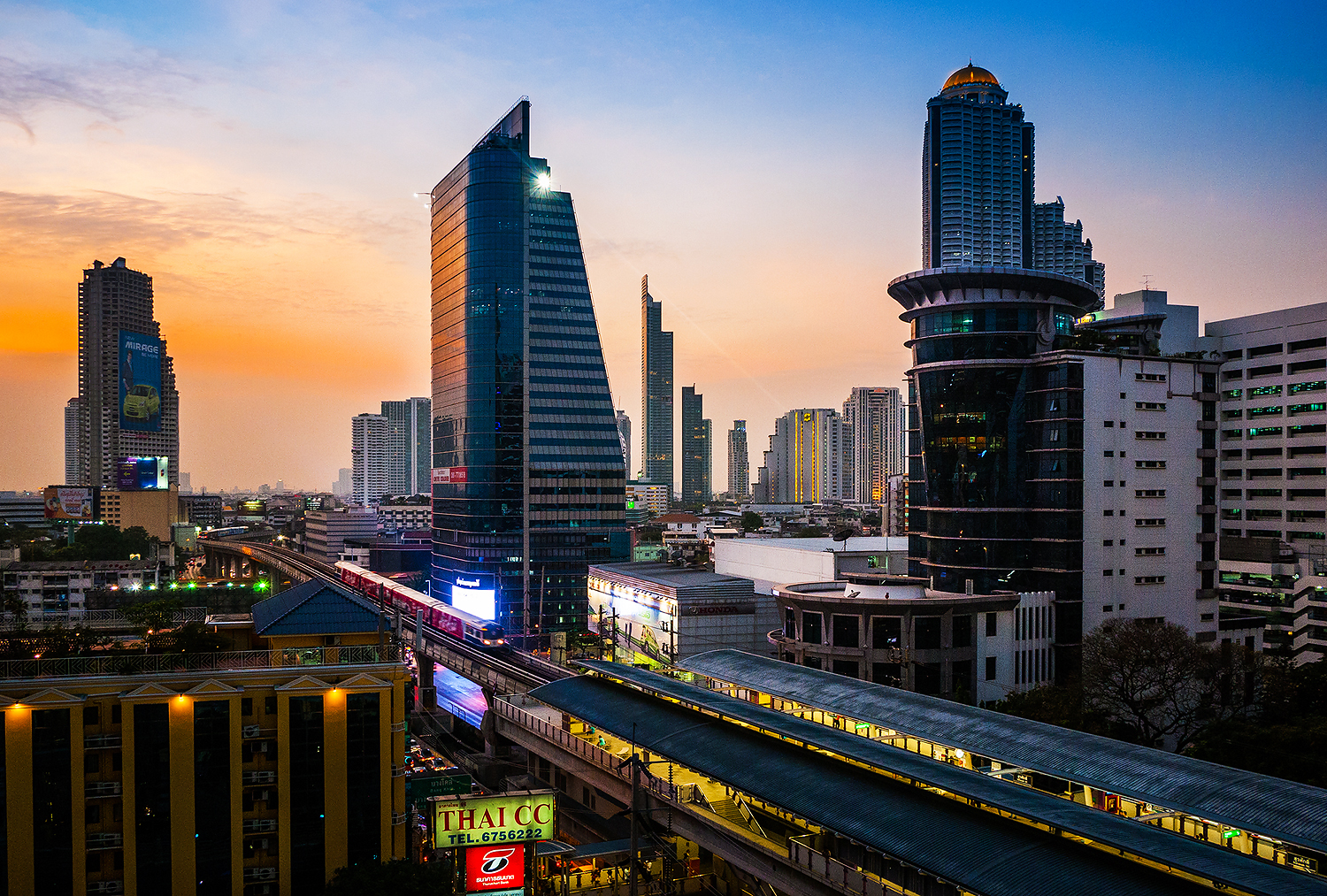
- BTS Skytrain is approaching to Surasak Station (as seen from Yan Nawa, Sathon)

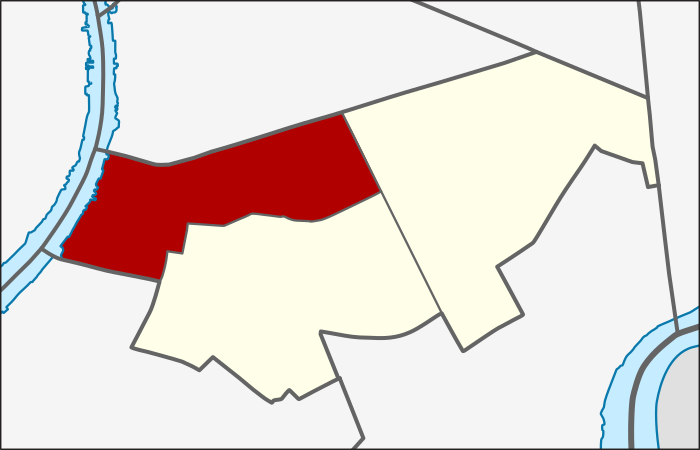
- Location in Sathon District
- Coordinates: 13°42′52″N 100°30′55″E
- Country: Thailand
- Province: Bangkok
- District: Sathon

Area
  - Total: 2.090 km^{2} (0.807 sq mi)

Population (2017)
  - Total: 20,758
- Time zone: UTC+7 (ICT)
- Postal code: 10120
- TIS 1099: 102802

Yan Nawa (Thai: ยานนาวา, pronounced [jāːn nāːwāː]) is a khwaeng (subdistrict) of Sathon District, in Bangkok, Thailand. In 2017 it had a population of 20,758 people.

== History ==
In 1939, the subdistrict was renamed from Ban Thawai (บ้านทะวาย) to Yan Nawa, following the same name change of Yan Nawa District. In 1989, the subdistrict together with Thung Wat Don was split off from Yan Nawa District to form Sathon District.

The reason why it used to be called "Ban Thawai" (Tavoyan hamlet) because in the past Yan Nawa used to be a residence in Bangkok by the Tavoyan people who were forcibly brought up from Tavoy (now Dawei) in the south during the reign of King Rama I in the early Rattanakosin period more than 250 years ago. It is assumed that the territory of Ban Tawai covers the area of Wat Rat Singkhon and the departure point of the Chao Phraya Express Boat at present Wat Phraya Krai, Bang Kho Laem.
