= Teochew Cemetery (Bangkok) =

Cemetery in Thailand

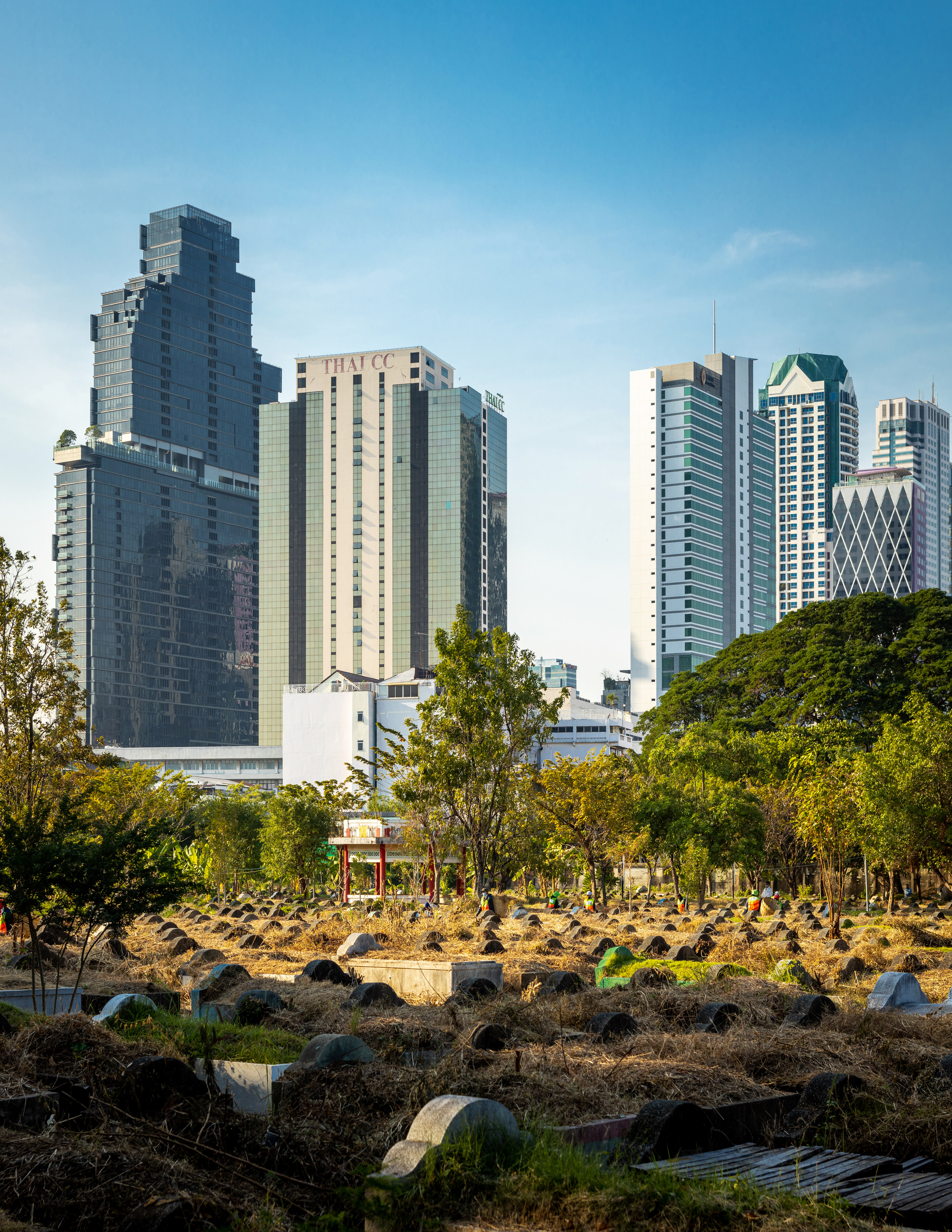
- Teochew Cemetery in January 2021
- Interactive map of Teochew Cemetery

Details
- Established: 1899
- Location: Bangkok
- Country: Thailand
- Coordinates: 13°42′50″N 100°31′30″E
- Type: Chinese cemetery
- Style: Traditional Chinese Style
- Owned by: Tio Chew Association; Poh Teck Tung Foundation; Hainan Dan Family Association
- Size: 85 rai (13.6 ha; 34 acres)
- No. of graves: Around 7,000

The Teochew Cemetery (Thai: สุสานแต้จิ๋ว) is a large cemetery in Bangkok's Sathon District. Covering an area of about 105 rai (16.8 ha; 42 acres), it was also known as the Wat Don Graveyard (ป่าช้าวัดดอน) and was widely believed to be haunted. The cemetery was founded in 1899 and actually consists of adjacent cemeteries managed by three organisations, namely the Tio Chew Association of Thailand, the Poh Teck Tung Foundation and the Hainan Dan Family Association. In 1996, the district administration began renovating the derelict site, and part of the cemetery now also serves as a public park.
