= Acharavadee Wongsakon =

Thai lay Buddhist teacher who teaches Techo Vipassana Meditation

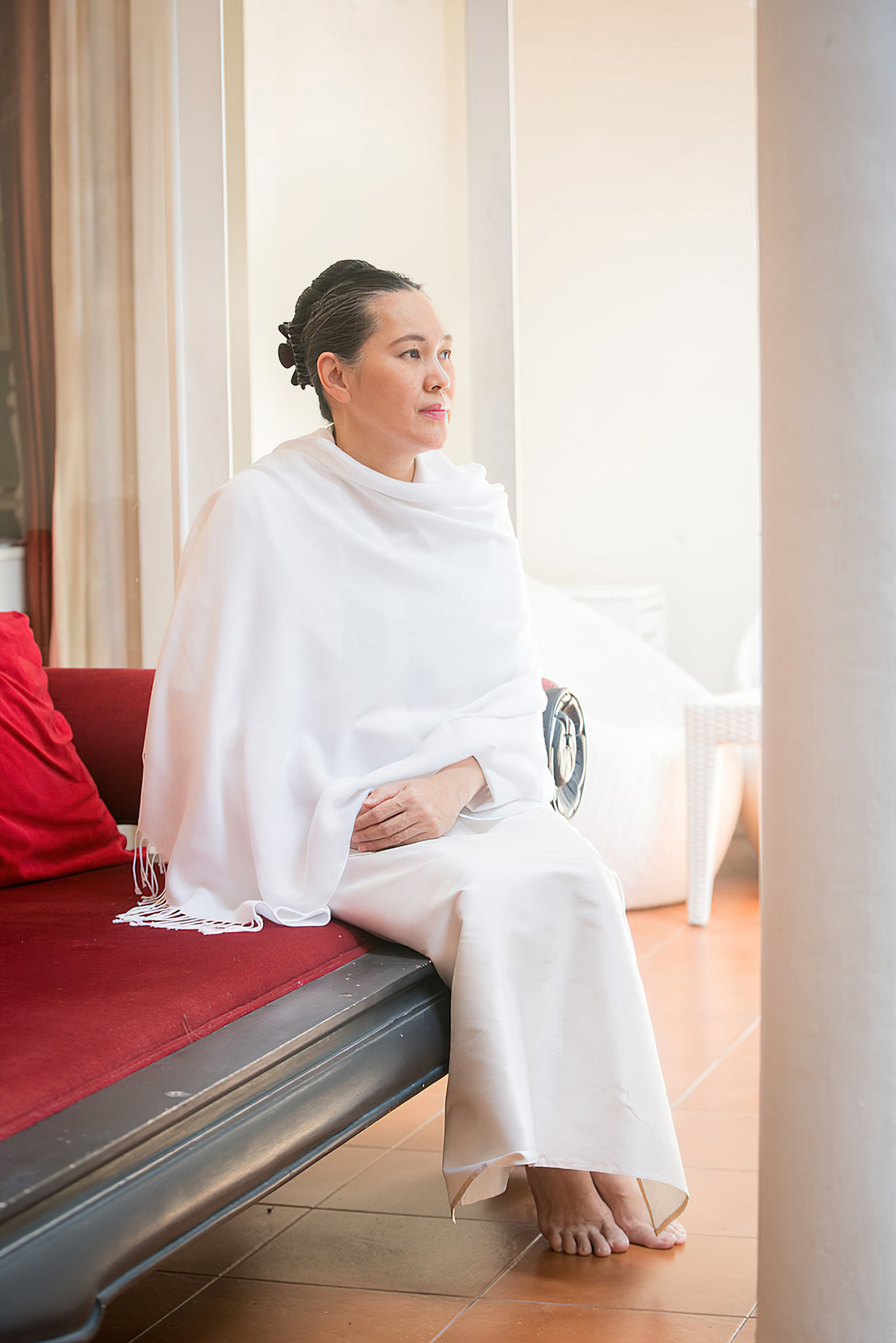
- Born: Acharavadee Wongsakon; September 28, 1965 (age 60); Bangkok, Thailand
- Known for: Founding Knowing Buddha Organization, Techo Vipassana Meditation
- Notable work: Top Ideas in Buddhism, Awaken from the Madness
- Spouse: Married
- Children: 3
- Website: www.knowingbuddha.org

Acharavadee Wongsakon is a Thai lay Buddhist teacher and former entrepreneur who teaches a form of Vipassana meditation called Techo Vipassana Meditation. She is the founder of the Knowing Buddha Organization, which campaigns against disrespectful uses of Buddha imagery and the general decline of morality in society. Acharvadee and the Knowing Buddha Foundation have been endorsed by the National Office of Buddhism.

== Biography ==
Acharavadee Wongsakon was born in Bangkok Thailand September 28, 1965. She is a Thai Buddhist Vipassana Meditation Master best known for her efforts in protecting Buddhism and raising awareness about the declining Buddhist morality in Thailand and globally.

Acharavadee took up mediation practice to help cope with the stresses of business life and celebrity. Vipassana Meditation practice lead Acharavadee to reevaluate her life and priorities and eventually withdrew herself from the social stage and business world.

Acharavadee sold her company, using the money to open the School of Life, a school for children, where she became a Dhamma teacher, teaching children for free. “Respect is Common Sense” is the slogan of the organization, which views Buddha as the father of the Buddhist religion. Acharavadee, during 2006 visit to Buddha bar in Paris, witnessed the disrespect of the Image of Buddha in a popular night club, which prompted her to establish The Knowing Buddha Organization (KBO) to raise global awareness that Buddha is the father of the Buddhist religion and Buddha's image should not be treated as decoration or used to promote the sale of alcohol. Some of the companies Knowing Buddha has cooperated with to stop the misuse of Buddha images as decoration are Louis Vuitton and Disney Pictures. Other campaigns promoted by Acharavadee and the Knowing Buddha Organization is to bring awareness to the problem of accelerated climate change, resulting from the overuse of cloud storage globally, fueled by selfie photos and exponential increase in cloud data storage on platforms such an Instagram and Facebook. Estimates are that by 2025 to use 1/5th world electrical consumption from cloud storage will reach 20% of total consumption. Acharavadee is a bestselling author in Thailand and publishing both in Thai and English language books on Buddhism and Buddhist Morality. Most notable works, “Awaken from the Madness” and “Top Ideas in Buddhism”.

Acharavadee's KBO Earth Climate campaign is aimed at reducing the global storage of unnecessary digital data generated daily.

== Early life ==
Acharavadee Wongsakon was born to Mr. Chaiyong and Mrs. Somjit Wongsakon, on September 28, 1965 in Bangkok Noi District, Bangkok. Acharavadee enjoyed a simple upbringing Thai Family style in the Kingdom of Thailand near the banks of the Chao Phraya River in Bangkok. Educated in public schools She attended Suwannaramwittayakom School and Sripatum University.

== Career ==
In 2005 Acharavadee established the Saint Tropez Diamond Company in Bangkok, and selling collection of high fashion jewelry inspired by the luxury and unique style of Saint Tropez, France.

In 2008 Acharavadee decided to sell her business and quietly withdraw from social life to devote her life to teaching Buddhism, morality and practicing meditation. With proceeds from the sale of her business, Acharavadee purchased land in central Bangkok and established the School of Life Foundation, teaching Dhamma to children and teenagers without any charge. She taught children the importance of morality and to always rely their own experiences in life, instead of memorizing from words in textbooks. Acharavadee guided her students with the correct way of living and with right view towards the world. Acharavadee's teachings at School of Life captured the interest of many in Thai Society, eventually leading her to open Mediation centers throughout Thailand aimed at teaching adult students these same values.

In 2011 Acharavadee Wongsakon began to teach the Techo Vipassana technique to students. After nine years, Acharavadee established Techo Vipassana Dhamma Path. Acharavadee purchased land at the foothills of Phra Phutthabat Noi in Kaeng Koi District, Saraburi Province, Thailand where she established her first Techo Vipassana retreat. Techo Vipassana is meditation practice that follows the Four Foundations of Mindfulness practice, using the technique of igniting the fire element in the body to burn down Kilesa ( mental impurities).

== Published books ==
Meditation Master Acharavadee Wongsakon has published a number of books in Thailand and Internationally. Her books include:

=== Thai language titles ===
- Tired Out But Not Fall down, Date: 5/2005, 224 Pages, Thai, ISBN 974-93056-8-X
- The last Dhamma Boat, Date: 5/2005, 144 Pages, Thai, ISBN 974-93531-7-X (paperback)|
- Observing moral precepts before it is too late, Date: 3/2008, 185 Pages, Thai, ISBN 9789749898864 (paper back)|
- Techo Vipassana Meditation, a gate opening to Nirvana, 2010, 228 Pages, Thai, ISBN 9786169110187 (paperback)
- Vipassana Meditation to kill impurities, Date: 3/2011, 104 Pages, Thai, ISBN 9789744968760 (paperback)
- Know It And Fight, Date: 5/2012, 216 Pages, Thai, ISBN 9786169110101 (paperback)
- Enlightened Layperson (Breaking The Code), 3/2016, 340 pages, Thai, ISBN 9786169110170 (paperback)
- Enlightened Layperson II , Date: 7/2017, 426 pages, Thai, ISBN 9786168125007 (paperback)

=== English language titles ===
- Top Ideas in Buddhism and Famous Stories in Buddha's Time, Date: 09/2018, 208 Pages, English, ISBN 9786168125069
- Awaken from the Madness Date: 12/2018, 360 Pages, English, ISBN 974-93531-7-X (paperback)

== Other works ==
5000s Magazine is a Bilingual (Thai / English) High quality Magazine, developed for Thai and English speaking Buddhist and others to show Buddhists a representations of a modern Lifestyle which combines Buddhist moral values and Dhamma. The magazine through photos, interviews and stories gives readers an illustrations for living their life with morality and Buddhist faith, in a fast-paced modern thai society.

== Controversy ==
Acharavadee Wongsakon's voice of Buddhist morality has made her a controversial figure in Thailand. Acharavadee has publicly criticized some of Thai Buddhist clergy for not adhering to the strict Buddhist practices and conduct. This led to Acharavadee being disparaged by the media and by some of the male dominated Buddhist establishment. Thai culture prohibits women from criticizing monks, even if the criticism if well founded. The Thai Media have accused Acharavadee of acting superior towards monks and alleged that Acharavadee's monk students have bowed to their female teacher. The act of a Thai monk bowing to any female is considered taboo.

Acharavadee's Techo Vipassana Meditation technique has also been criticised by the media. Acharavadee's detractors argue that Acharvadee's Techo Vipassana meditation is not mentioned by name in any Buddhist historical accounts and they argue that this should disqualify the Techo technique and discredit her, from teaching this method. Some have labeled Acharvadee's Techo Vipassana mediation centers as a cult.

Acharavadee's critics were silenced, when the National Office of Buddhism investigated and later endorsed Acharvadee Wongsakon and her foundation, the Knowing Buddha Organization.
