= Satri Si Suriyothai School =

- โรงเรียนสตรีศรีสุริโยทัย
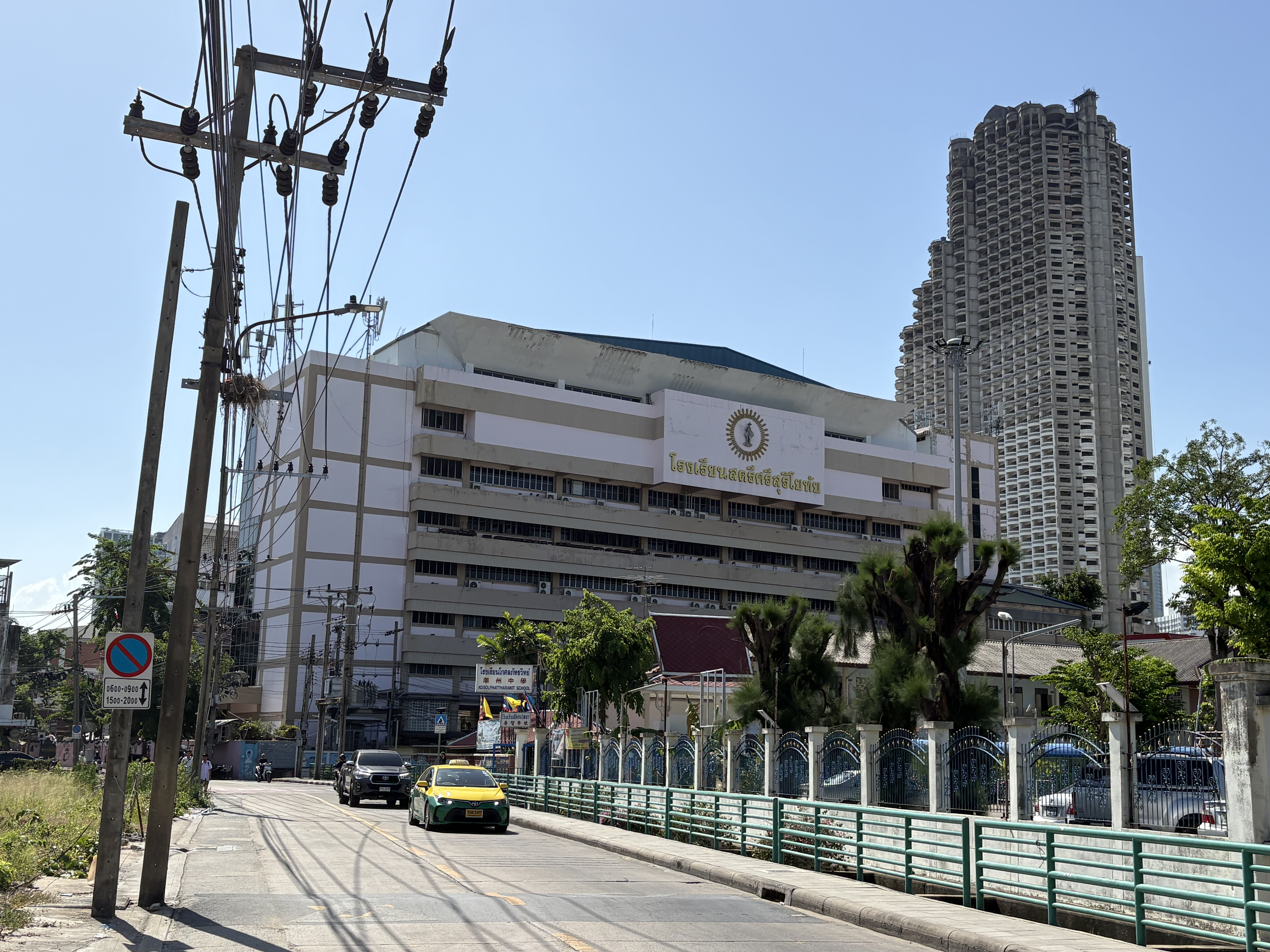

Location
- Bangkok; Thailand
- 13.714968°N 100.515989°E

Information
- Type: Public secondary school
- Motto: Pali: วิชฺชาจารณสมฺปนฺนา สาเสฏฺฐา (Thai Script); Pali: Vijjācāranฺasampannā Sāsetฺtฺhā (Roman Script) (Person with higher knowledge and good behavior is a superb asset.)
- Established: November 15, 1922
- Locale: 1 Soi Charoen Krung 57, Charoen Krung Road, Yannawa, Sathorn District, Bangkok, 10120, Thailand
- School board: The Secondary Educational Service Area Office 2
- School district: The Secondary Educational Service Area 2
- Authority: Office of the Basic Education Commission
- Oversight: Ministry of Education
- Grades: Mathayom 1–6 (US grades 7–12)
- Gender: Girls' School
- Colors: Brown and Pink
- Website: www.suriyothai.ac.th

Satri Si Suriyothai School is a public school for girls located at 1 Soi Charoen Krung 57, Charoen Krung Road, Yannawa, Sathon District, Bangkok, 10120 in Thailand.

== History ==
Satri Si Suriyothai School was established on 1 August 1922. It was formerly named Satriwatsuthiwararam School. Sae Milindtasood was the first principle, remaining for 70 years, until 1992.

The number of students increased every year. The Ministry of Education purchased the building of the health center, and built a new wooden building. The school moved to that building on 17 May 1931, and the school's name was changed to Satribarndawei School.

In 1939, the Ministry of Education split Satribarndawei School into two schools: Satribarndawei School, with 4 acres with Kraungkaew Patumanon as principal/teacher. The school was renamed Satri Sri Suriyothai School on 15 November 1939; School of Computer Pranakorntai, which taught only women with Lady Prayong Tongdidkitchakarn as a principal.

The school has three buildings. The buildings are arranged in a U-shape: with the Yanee building on the left, the Krongtong building in the middle, and the Charoemprakiat building on the right.

== Courses ==
- Mathayom 1–3: regular, science/math and mini-English programs
- Mathayom 4–6: science-math, science-math inter, intensive science-math, art-Chinese, art-Japanese, art-Korean and art-French programs, นิเทศศาสตร์-ศิลปะกรรม-ดนตรี

== Vision ==
Satri Si Suriyothai School is set up to be a community of learning subscribing to the idea of sufficiency economy and teaches students to be well-mannered Thai ladies along with understanding of modern technology.
