= Thung Maha Mek =

Thung Maha Mek ทุ่งมหาเมฆ
- Khwaeng
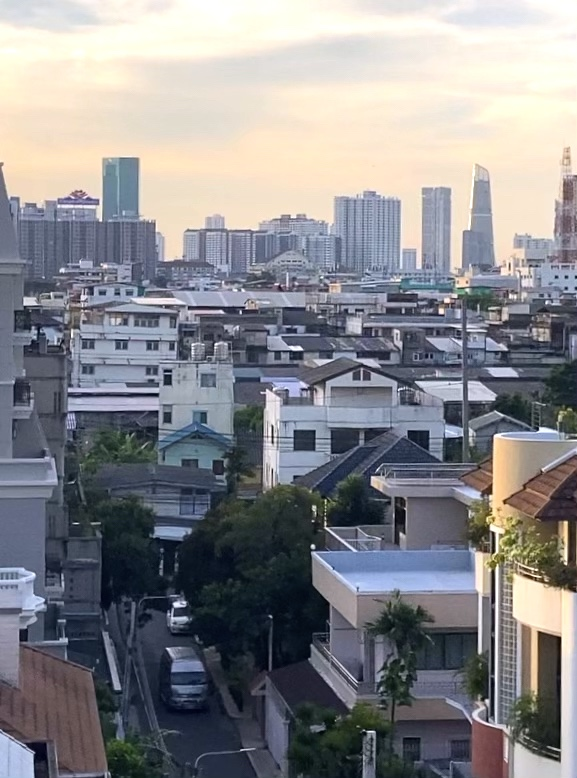

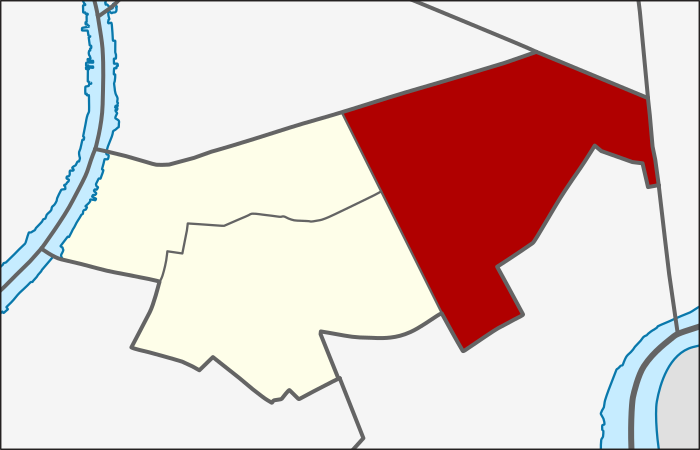
- Location in Sathon District
- Country: Thailand
- Province: Bangkok
- Khet: Sathon

Area
  - Total: 4.041 km^{2} (1.560 sq mi)

Population (2020)
  - Total: 19,104
- Time zone: UTC+7 (ICT)
- Postal code: 10120
- TIS 1099: 102803

Thung Maha Mek (Thai: ทุ่งมหาเมฆ, pronounced [tʰûŋ mā.hǎː mêːk]) is a neighborhood in the Sathorn District of Bangkok. Legally, Tungmahamek is one of three khwaeng, or subdistricts which together comprise Sathorn District. In 2020, it had a total population of 19,104 people.

The name "Thung Maha Mek" literally means "a field of many clouds (or a vast expanse of clouds)." It is believed that this name comes from the area's former landscape, which consisted of wide open fields and rice paddies. The terrain was spacious and unobstructed, with cool breezes blowing through. This is reflected in the name of a nearby road, Yen Akat Road (ถนนเย็นอากาศ, lit. 'cool air road'). During World War II, people often evacuated from the city to this area to escape the bombings.
