= Huachiew Chalermprakiet University =

華僑崇聖大學 Huachiew Chalermprakiet University
- มหาวิทยาลัยหัวเฉียวเฉลิมพระเกียรติ
- Motto: Studying, so as to be of service to society
- Type: Private
- Established: 1941
- Location: Bang Phli, Samut Prakan, Thailand; 13.612757°N 100.758124°E
- Colors: █ Gold
- Nickname: HCU
- Website: www.hcu.ac.th/en/

Huachiew Chalermprakiet University (HCU) is a university in Samut Prakan Province, Thailand. It is organized into 13 faculties and a graduate school.

Huachiew (Chinese: 華僑; pinyin: Huáqiáo) comes from Teochew dialect and means 'overseas Chinese'. It is the name the foundation uses as the name of the foundation's hospital and college.

== History ==
Huachiew Chalermprakiet University was founded by the Poh Tek Sieng Tung Overseas Chinese Foundation, which is the largest charitable Chinese organization in Thai society. Its policy is to support education in order to develop human resources in a project referred to as "Service to Society and Educational Development".

Huachiew Chalermprakiet University has an institutional history of over fifty years, having a developmental path that can be divided into three periods:

1941: Huachiew Hospital Midwifery School established with the aim of producing midwifery supervisors; they are to have knowledge and ability in nursing and midwifery, which is to be applied to the benefit of society and nation.

1982: Poh Tek Tung Foundation Committee, conscious of the work of the government in developing the nation in accordance with the Fourth National Economic and Social Development Plan (1977–1981), expands the former Huachiew Hospital into a general hospital offering curative services and advice to people requesting services in every medical field, and in addition, expanding the midwifery school into a nursing college where the Faculty of Nursing offers a Bachelor of Science program in nursing and midwifery and names the college "Huachiew College", and later establishing a Faculty of Social Work, with a Bachelor of Social Work program, as an additional faculty.

1990: Poh Tek Tung Foundation's 80th anniversary. The foundation resolves to elevate the status of Huachiew College to that of university and receives approval from the University Bureau for its foundation. It becomes "Huachiew Chalermprakiet University" on the 11 May 1992.

== See also ==
- List of universities in Thailand
