= Wat Phraya Krai subdistrict =

Coordinates: 13°42′15.81″N 100°30′23.33″E

Wat Phraya Krai วัดพระยาไกร
- Khwaeng
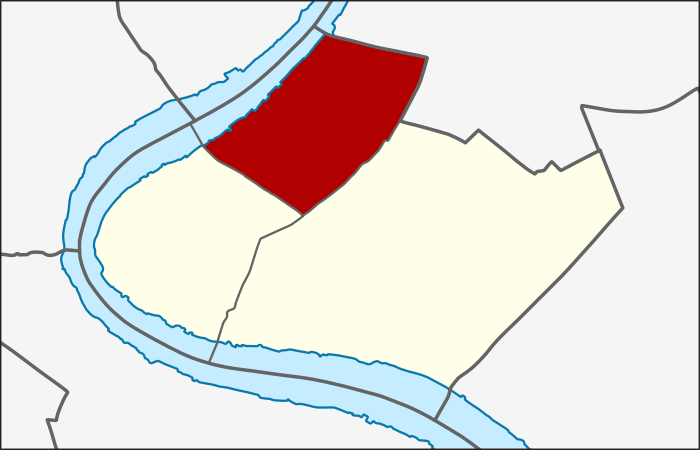
- Location in Bang Kho Laem District
- Country: Thailand
- Province: Bangkok
- Khet: Bang Kho Laem

Area
  - Total: 2.300 km^{2} (0.888 sq mi)

Population (2020)
  - Total: 24,198
- Time zone: UTC+7 (ICT)
- Postal code: 10120
- TIS 1099: 103102

Wat Phraya Krai (Thai: วัดพระยาไกร, pronounced [wát pʰrā.jāː krāj]) is one of three khwaeng (sub-district) of Bang Kho Laem district, Bangkok. It has a total area of 2.300 km^{2} (round about 0.888 mi^{2}) west side along Chao Phraya river and in late 2017, it had a total population of 26,681 people.

== History ==
The name means "Phraya Krai Temple", derived from the original temple that once stood here. It is believed that the temple was established before 1801. Later, Phraya Shoduek Ratchasetthi (magnate Boonma), former governor under King Nangklao (Rama III), restored it as a royal monastery, renaming it "Wat Chotanaram", and enshrining the famous Golden Buddha image there (now housed at Wat Traimit in Chinatown).

During the reign of King Chulalongkorn (Rama V), the temple lost its patrons and was subsequently abandoned. The chapel and other structures fell into ruin, and the land was eventually leased to the East Asiatic Company for its Bangkok headquarters (now Asiatique The Riverfront). Nevertheless, the name Wat Phraya Krai remains in use today as the name of the sub-district and various locations within it, such as Watprayakrai Police Station and Wat Phraya Krai Post Office.

== Places of interest ==
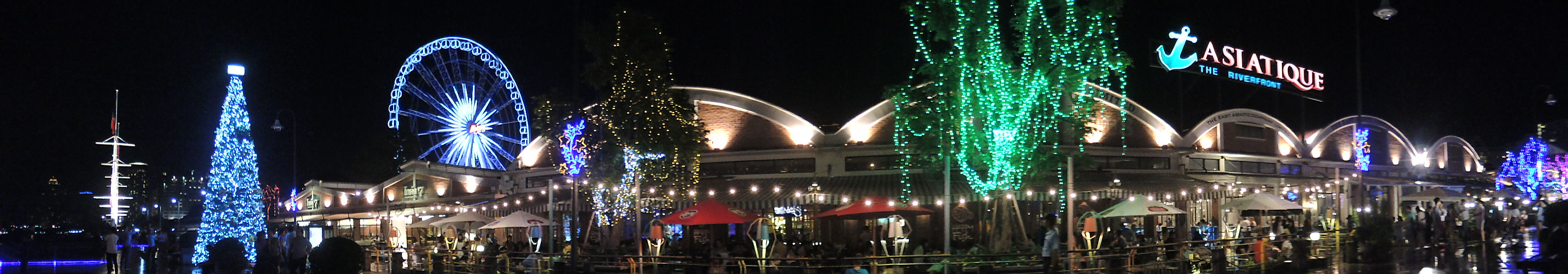
View of Asiatique The Riverfront, a leading shopping center and night market in Wat Phraya Krai
- Asiatique The Riverfront
- Shrewsbury International School
- Masjid Al Bayaan
- Masjid Bang Uthit
- Masjid Darul Abideen
- Chatrium Hotel Riverside Bangkok
- Protestant Cemetery
- Ramada Plaza Menam Riverside Bangkok
- Wat Ratcha Singkhorn
- Wat Worachanyawas

== Main roads ==
- Charoen Krung Road
- Chan Road
