= Sathon district =

Sathon สาทร
- District
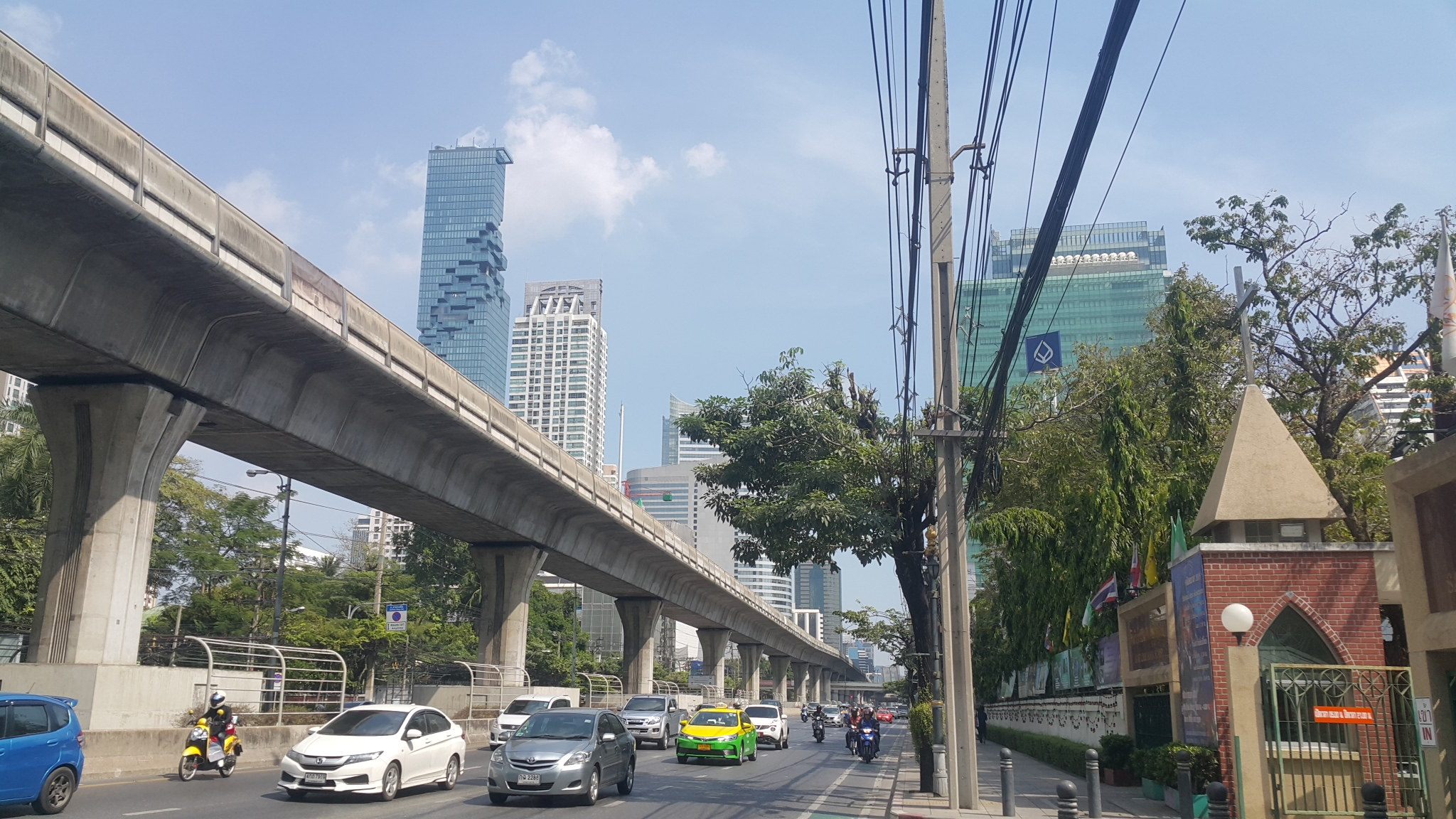
- Sathon Road in the area of Sathon District

- District location in Bangkok
- Coordinates: 13°42′29″N 100°31′35″E
- Country: Thailand
- Province: Bangkok
- Seat: Thung Wat Don
- Khwaeng: 3
- District established: 9 November 1989

Area
  - Total: 9.326 km^{2} (3.601 sq mi)

Population (2017)
  - Total: 79,624
  - Density: 8,537.85/km^{2} (22,112.9/sq mi)
- Time zone: UTC+7 (ICT)
- Postal code: 10120
- Geocode: 1028

Sathon or Sathorn (Thai: สาทร, pronounced [sǎː.tʰɔ̄ːn]), is a district (khet) of Bangkok, Thailand, one of fifty into which the city is divided. Situated along the Chao Phraya River in central Bangkok, Sathorn is home to numerous intergovernmental organizations, foreign embassies, and Southeast Asian offices of multinational corporations. Its neighboring districts are (clockwise from north): Bang Rak, Pathum Wan, Khlong Toei, Yan Nawa, Bang Kho Laem, and Khlong San (across the Chao Phraya River).

== History ==
Sathorn district was once part of Yan Nawa. Due to its large area and population, first a branch district office of Yan Nawa was set up on 9 March 1989 to serve the people in three khwaeng of Yan Nawa. And then on 9 November 1989, the Sathon district was established inheriting the area once served by the branch office.

The district is named after Sathon Road and Khlong Sathon. Khlong Sathon, the older of the two, is a canal (khlong) dug for public transportation by a Chinese company. The Chinese owner was later granted the name Luang Sathon Racha Yut (หลวงสาทรราชายุตก์) by King Chulalongkorn for his accomplishment. Both sides of the canal later became Sathon Road. Incorrect Thai spelling for Sathon สาธร had been used for very long time, but it was corrected in April 1999. His former house is now Sathon Mansion in Bang Rak District.

== Administration ==
The district is divided into three sub-districts (khwaeng).

No.	Name	Thai	Area (km^{2})	Map
1.	Thung Wat Don	ทุ่งวัดดอน	3.195	Map
2.	Yan Nawa	ยานนาวา	2.090	Map
3.	Thung Maha Mek	ทุ่งมหาเมฆ	4.041	Map
Total			9.326	Map

The Department of Airports of Thailand is headquartered in Sathon, as was its predecessor, the Department of Civil Aviation.

Aeronautical Radio of Thailand (AEROTHAI) and Bangkok Dock Company, the state enterprises under the Ministry of Transport also based in the district.

== Sathon Road ==
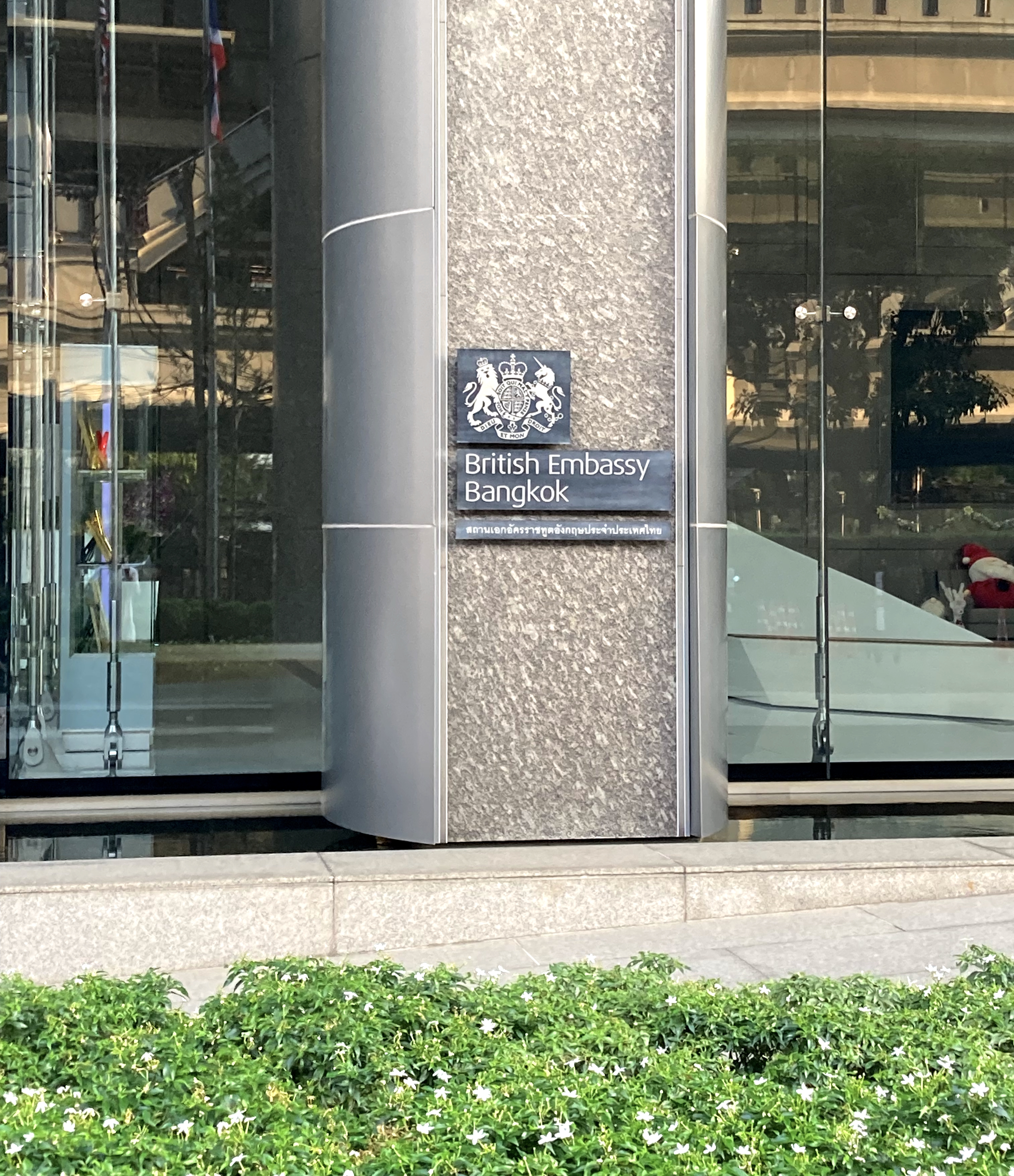
One of several diplomatic missions based in Sathorn

Sathon Road marks the northern boundary of the district, with the southern lane of the road belonging to Sathon District and the northern lane across the Sathon Canal belonging to Bang Rak.

Along Sathon Road there are many up-scale hotels, the famous "Robot Building", Saint Louis Hospital (and church, and school), the Apostolic Nunciature of The Holy See, and the Blue Elephant cooking school.

== Places ==
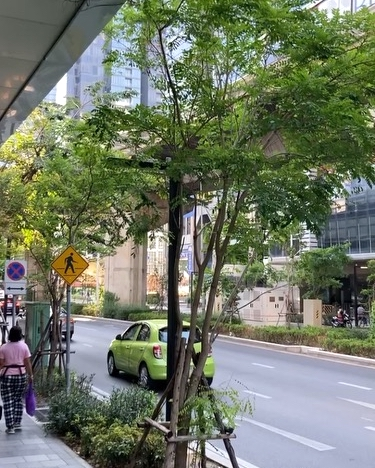
Typical Sathorn cityscape

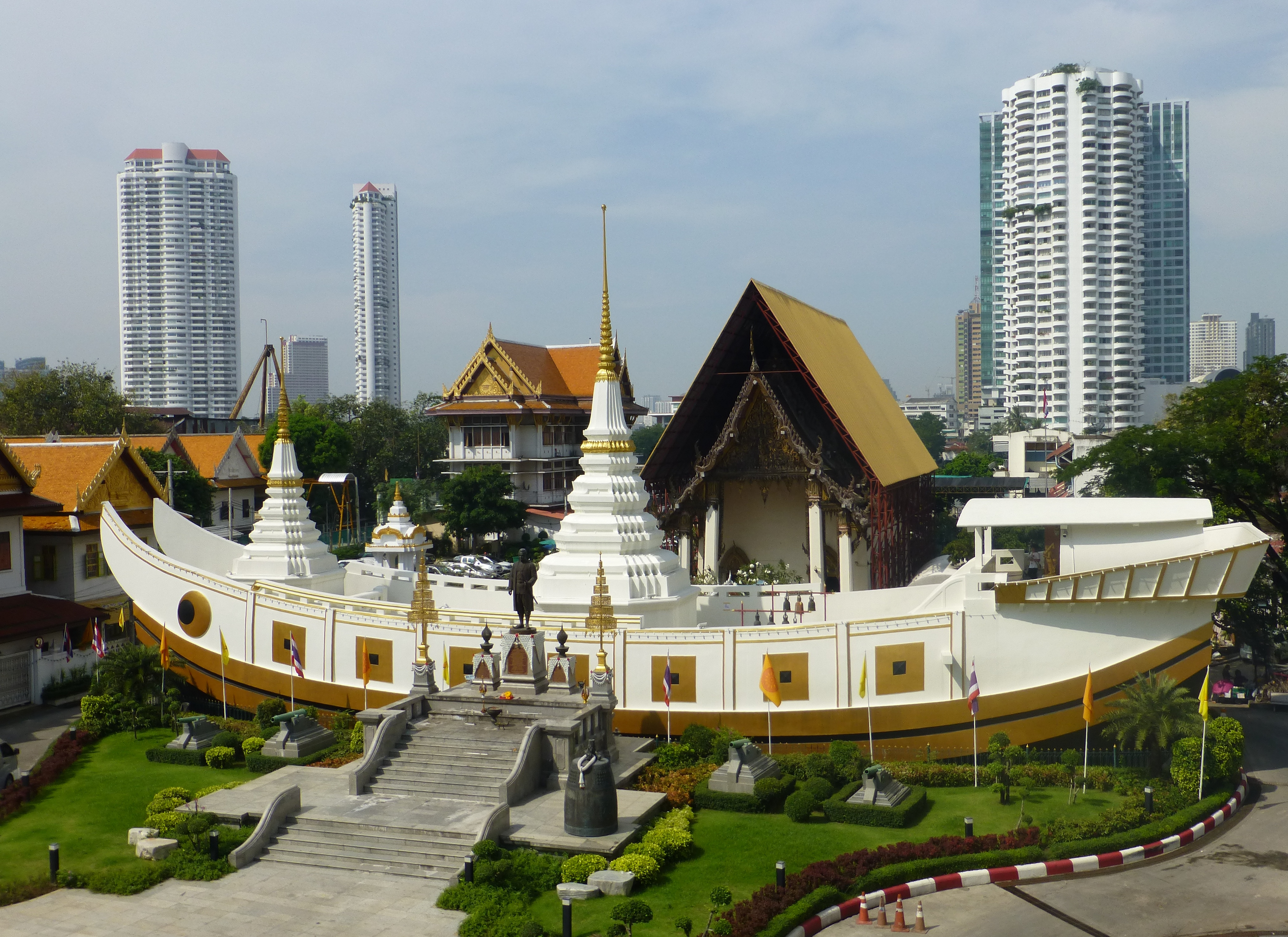
Wat Yannawa, a temple in Sathon with a pagoda shaped like a Chinese junk

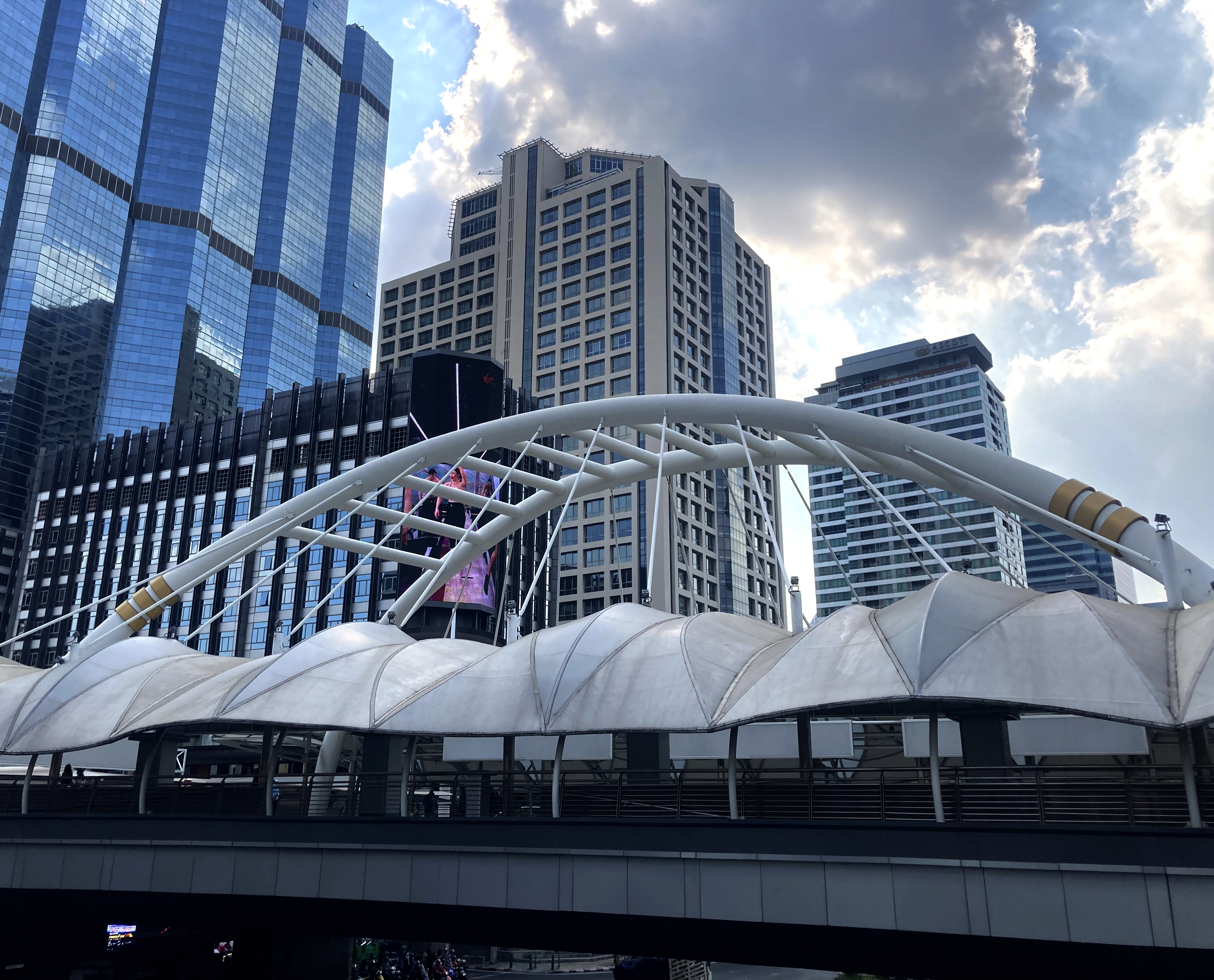
Chong Nonsi Station, elevated above a major intersection

Wat Yannawa (วัดยานนาวา), a temple dating back to the Ayutthaya period, is probably the best known temple in Sathon. It has a unique junk-shaped chedi and viharn built by King Rama III. The idea behind the construction was that Chinese junk was quickly disappearing and the pagoda should show present descendants what it looked like. The temple was known as Wat Kok Khwai (วัดคอกควาย) during the Ayutthaya Kingdom and Wat Kok Krabue (วัดคอกกระบือ) during the Thonburi and early-Bangkok eras before the construction of the chedi.

Wat Don (วัดดอน) was built in 1797 during the King Rama I period by people who immigrated from Tavoy, Myanmar. The name Wat Don is equally well known for the Wat Don Cemetery not far away. The graveyard contains the remains of people of Chinese heritage. In the past, it was rumored to be a haunted place. Next to the cemetery is Wat Prok (วัดปรก), a Mon-styled Buddhist temple.

Hindu Dharma Sabha Association (สมาคมฮินดูธรรมสภา), better known as Wat Vishnu (วัดวิษณุ), is one of Bangkok's oldest and most prominent Hindu temples, alongside the Sri Mahamariamman Temple in Bang Rak and the Devasathan in Phra Nakhon. Founded in 1920, it is a Vaishnavite temple and is regarded as the only one in the city that enshrines idols of all the major Hindu deities. It is located in the same alley as Wat Prok.

Saint Louis Church (วัดเซนต์หลุยส์), the only Catholic church along Sathon Road, was named in honour of Saint Louis.

Within Soi Sathon 3, commonly known as Soi Suan Phlu, which literally means "betel garden alley," the name originates from the area's past as a place where Chinese residents cultivated betel. Soi Suan Phlu connects Sathon Road to the Thung Maha Mek, and continues onward to Chan Road in the neighboring district Yan Nawa. The soi is home to M.R. Kukrit's House (บ้านคึกฤทธิ์), locally known as Ban Soi Suan Phlu (บ้านซอยสวนพลู, "the house of Soi Suan Phlu"), the private residence of M.R. Kukrit Pramoj, a former Prime Mininster and an important national figure. The residence consists of five beautifully crafted traditional Thai houses, and today it serves as a heritage museum.

San Chao Mae Brahma Met (ศาลเจ้าแม่พรหมเมศ) is a Teochew Chinese joss house situated on Charoen Krung Road, near Sathon Bridge and Wat Yannawa. It was originally located at the mouth of Khlong Sathon, but was relocated to its present site when Sathon Bridge was constructed. Next to the shrine is Soi Wanglee (ซอยหวั่งหลี), a historic community that once thrived during the transition from the Chinese junk era to the age of steamships. In its heyday, the area was filled with docks, rice mills, and served as the Chinese port for transporting goods and passengers to Singapore, Hong Kong, Shantou, and Hainan. These enterprises were joint ventures between Chinese-Thai businessmen during the reign of King Chulalongkorn. However, disputes eventually arose, and the properties were sold to the Wanglee family. On June 19, 1889, the area became the site of a major clash when two rival Chinese secret societies, composed of immigrant laborers, fought in the middle of Charoen Krung Road near Wat Yannawa. More than 1,000 people were involved in the conflict, which lasted for two days, leaving 20 dead and hundreds injured. As a result, rice mills and shops in Soi Wanglee shut down due to fears of unrest, and many Chinese coolies stopped working to join the fighting. In the end, the government under King Chulalongkorn suppressed the uprising, arresting 905 members of the secret societies. Today, the community has disappeared, leaving only an empty plot of land beside Wat Yannawa.

== Economy ==
Nok Air has its head office in the Rajanakarn Building in Yan Nawa, Sathon.

== Education ==
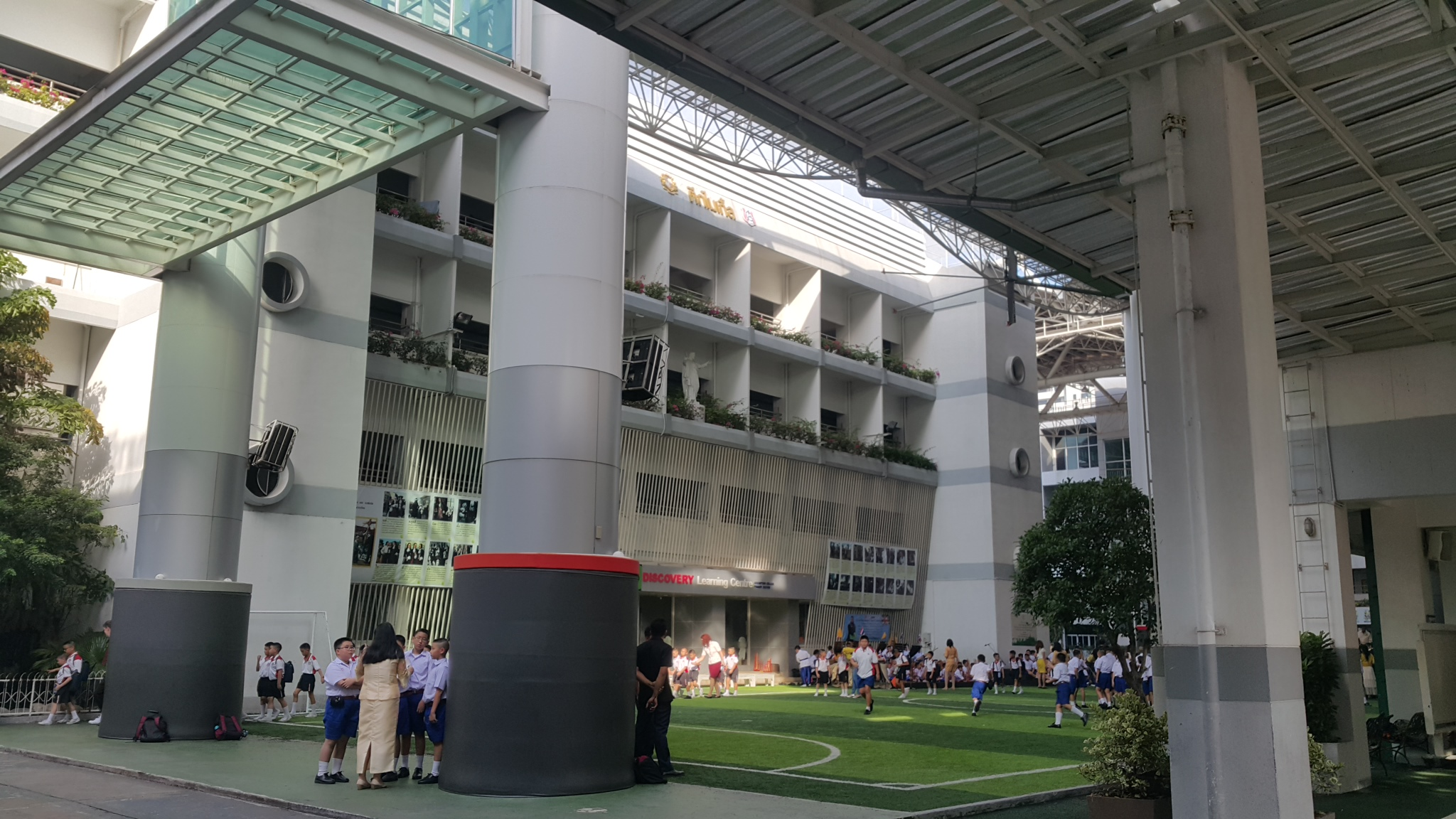
Assumption College Primary Section

- Assumption College Primary Section
- Garden International School Bangkok
- Rajamangala University of Technology Krungthep
- Wat Suthiwararam School
- Satri Si Suriyothai School
- Saint Louis College (Bangkok)

== Diplomatic missions ==
- Embassy of Austria
- Embassy of Brazil
- Embassy of Denmark
- Embassy of Germany
- Apostolic Nunciature of the Holy See
- Embassy of Luxembourg
- Embassy of Malaysia
- Embassy of Mexico
- Embassy of Morocco
- Embassy of Panama
- Embassy of Singapore
- Embassy of Slovakia
- Embassy of United Kingdom
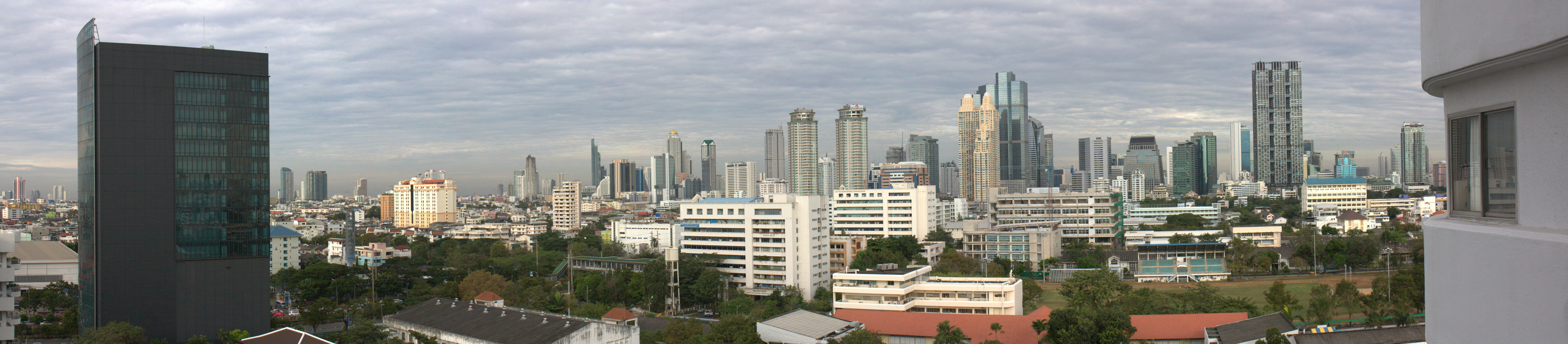
Sathon District from the Yan Nawa district
