= Thung Wat Don =

Thung Wat Don ทุ่งวัดดอน
- Khwaeng
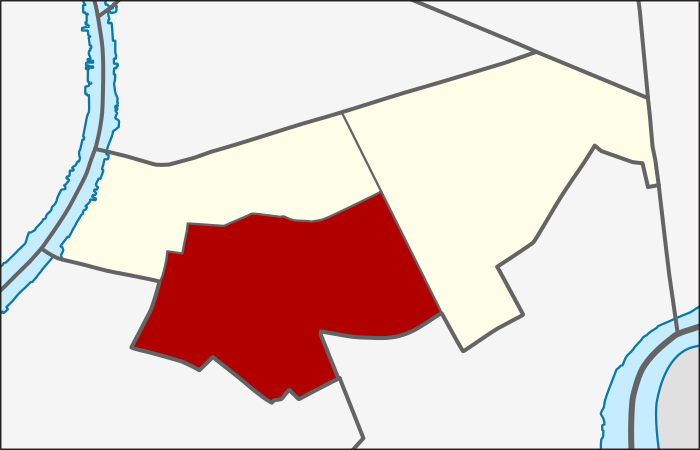
- Location in Sathon District
- Country: Thailand
- Province: Bangkok
- Khet: Sathon

Area
  - Total: 3.195 km^{2} (1.234 sq mi)

Population (2020)
  - Total: 37,107
- Time zone: UTC+7 (ICT)
- Postal code: 10120
- TIS 1099: 102801

Thung Wat Don (Thai: ทุ่งวัดดอน, pronounced [tʰûŋ wát dɔ̄ːn]) is a khwaeng (subdistrict) of Sathon District, in Bangkok, Thailand. In 2020, it had a total population of 37,107 people.
