= Knowing Buddha =

Thai Buddhist advocacy group

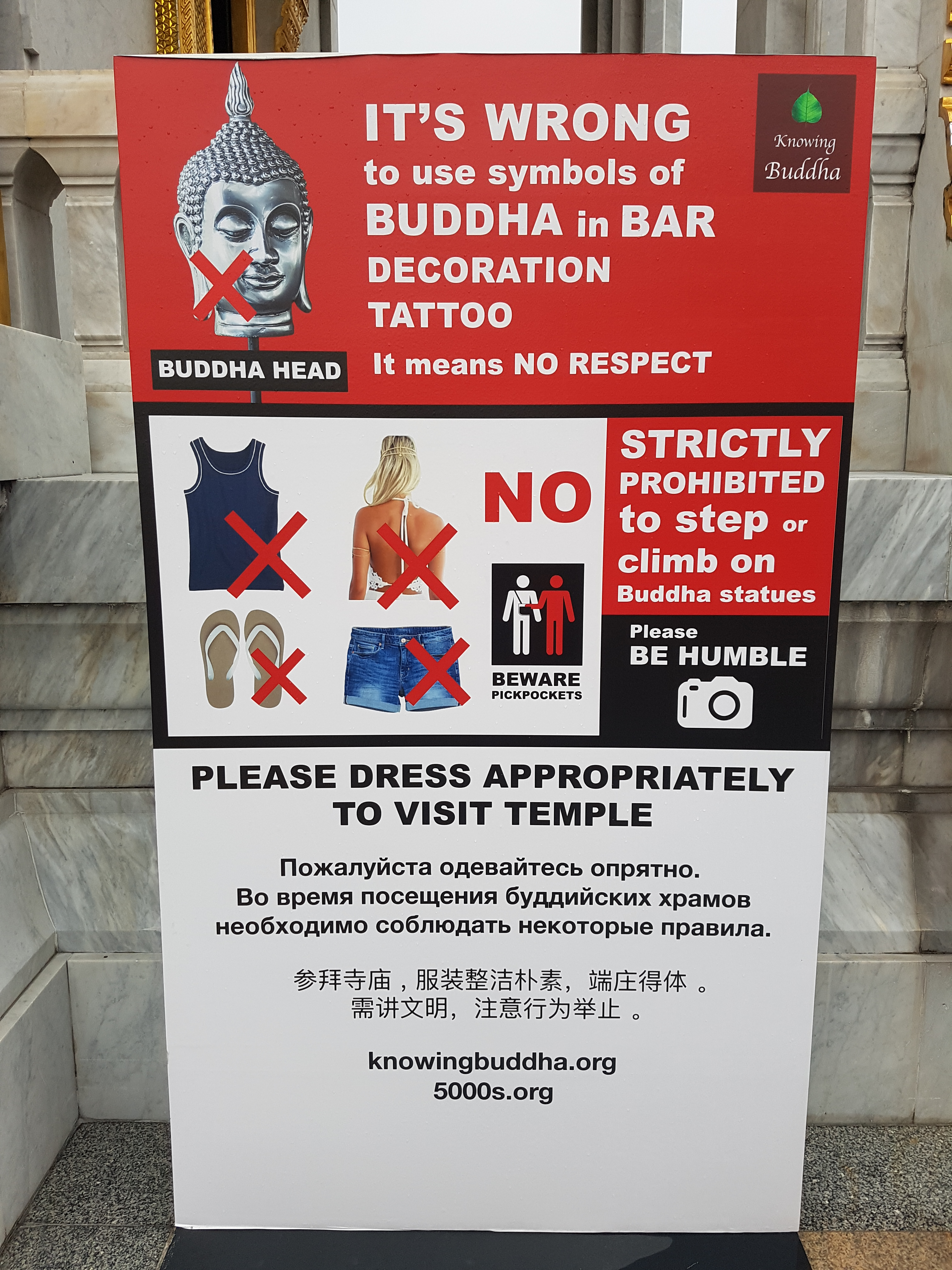
An advocacy banner by the Knowing Buddha Organization

Knowing Buddha (or the Knowing Buddha Organization, KBO) is a Buddhist advocacy group based in Thailand. It campaigns against disrespectful uses of images of the Buddha, and lobbies for laws to protect Buddhism in Thailand.

KBO was established in 2012 by former entrepreneur, vipassana meditation teacher and lay spiritual leader Acharavadee Wongsakon. Reports of its membership numbers range from 5,000 to 7,000. The organization aims to protect Buddhism by educating people on the proper form of respect that should be awarded to Buddha images. It also regularly protests against depictions of the Buddha it finds disrespectful, which it regards as blasphemy. It has successfully pressured manufacturers to discontinue production of toilets bearing Buddha images in France and the Netherlands, and caused the cancellation of a Maxim magazine photoshoot involving Buddha images. It has also protested against the inclusion of a dog character named Buddha in Disney's Air Buddies film series, as well as video games and comics featuring Buddha-inspired characters.

Although the organization's activities are nonviolent, it has also lobbied for the enactment of blasphemy laws which would criminalize the act of disrespecting Buddhism, and for Buddhism to be enshrined as the state religion. Observers and critics have accordingly pointed out that its ideals tend towards fundamentalism and religious intolerance.
