= Asian Physics Olympiad =

Annual physics competition in Asia

The Asian Physics Olympiad (APhO) is an annual physics competition for high school students from Asia and Oceania regions. It is one of the International Science Olympiads. It was initiated in the year 2000 by Indonesia. The first APhO was hosted by Indonesia in 2000.

APhO has its origins in the International Physics Olympiad and is conducted according to similar statutes (One five-hour theoretical examination and one or two laboratory examinations). It is usually held about two months before the IPhO and can also be seen as additional training for the teams.

Each national delegation is made up of eight competitors (unlike five in the IPhO) plus two leaders. Observers may also accompany a national team. The leaders are involved in the selection, preparation and translation of the exam tasks, and the translation and marking of exam papers. The students compete as individuals, and must sit through intensive theoretical and laboratory examinations. For their efforts the students can be awarded a medal (gold, silver or bronze) or an honorable mention.

== History ==
In 1999, the team leader of Indonesia, Prof. Yohanes Surya, Ph.D., together with the president of IPhO, Prof. Waldemar Gorzkowski, undertook to create and organize the first APhO, which was held in Indonesia, between April 24 and May 2, 2000. At this time, prof. Gorzkowski was also working in Indonesia to help with the IPhO team. The event attracted participants from 12 Asian countries. It now is attended by up to 27 countries.

Actively participating countries include Australia, Azerbaijan, Bangladesh, Cambodia, China, Hong Kong, India, Indonesia, Israel, Kazakhstan, Kyrgyzstan, Macau, Malaysia, Mongolia, Nepal, Russia, Saudi Arabia, Singapore, Sri Lanka, Taiwan, Tajikistan, Thailand, and Vietnam. Romania has participated in guest teams in the past years.

== Differences between APhO and IPhO ==
APhO has 8 students in each delegation, while IPhO has 5.

=== The award system ===
In 2001, the IPhO International Board accepted a new system of awarding the prizes. The new system, designed by Cyril Isenberg and Dr. Gunter Lind was based on a relative number of contestants for each type of award, instead of the score boundaries defined by percentage of the best contestant's score.

This was not acceptable for APhO, because the average level of contestants is different. The old system remained in power for APhO since the beginning up to 9th APhO in Mongolia, where the leaders voted for replacing it by a new award system suggested by Dr. Eli Raz from the Israeli delegation. The new system, sometimes unofficially referred to as the Israeli Award System, is based on a reference score that is the lowest between twice the median score and the mean score of the top 3 participants. It was first used on 10th APhO in Thailand.

== Summary ==
Information on previous years of the APhO:

Number	Year	City	Country	Date	Teams	Absolute Winner	Score	Best Theory	Score	Best Experiment	Score	Cutoffs (G/S/B/HM)
1	2000	Tangerang	Indonesia	April 23 – May 2, 2000	10	Song Jun-liang (China)	44.75/50					38/33/27/21
2	2001	Taipei	Taiwan	April 22 – May 1, 2001	12	Hsin-Yu Tsai (Taiwan)	34.50/50	Wei-Yin Chen (Taiwan)		Hsin-Yu Tsai (Taiwan)		28/25/20/16
3	2002	Singapore	Singapore	May 6–14, 2002	15	Gu Chunhui (China)	40.59/50	Agustinus Peter Sahanggamu (Indonesia)		Fan Xiangjun (China)		35/30/25/19
4	2003	Bangkok	Thailand	April 20–29, 2003	10	Pawit Sangchant (Thailand)	45.90/50					40/34/29/22
5	2004	Hanoi	Vietnam	April 26 – May 4, 2004	13	Ruitian Lang (China)	45.10/50	Ruitian Lang (China)	27.90/30	Yeming Shi (China)	19.75/20	39/34/28/22
6	2005	Pekanbaru	Indonesia	April 24 – May 2, 2005	17	Li Fang (China)	45.60/50	Yin-Hsuan Lin (Taiwan)	29.00/30	Han-Hsuan Lin (Taiwan)	19.15/20	40/35/29/22
7	2006	Almaty	Kazakhstan	April 22–30, 2006	18	Zhu Li (China)	44.30/50	Wang Xingze (China)		Ho Pangus (Indonesia)		39/34/28/21
8	2007	Shanghai	China	April 21–29, 2007	22	Yun Yang (China)	43.30/50	Han Yu Zhu (China)		Chang-Chi Wu (Chinese Taipei)		38/33/28/21
9	2008	Ulaanbaatar	Mongolia	April 20–28, 2008	18	Ji He (China)	42.70/50	Ying-Yu Ho (Taiwan)		Bo-Yu Chu (Taiwan)		37/32/27/20
10	2009	Bangkok	Thailand	April 24 – May 2, 2009	15	Lei Jin (China)	47.50/50	Xiong Zhaoxi (China)		Winson Tanputraman (Indonesia)		42/36/30/23
11	2010	Taipei	Taiwan	April 23 – May 1, 2010	16	Szu-Po Wang (Taiwan)	43.80/50	Szu-Po Wang (Taiwan)		Tzu-Ming Hsu (Taiwan)		32/28/23/18
12	2011	Tel Aviv	Israel	May 1–9, 2011	16	Yukai Wu (China)	42.60/50	Yukai Wu (China)		Tzu-Ming Hsu (Taiwan)		31/27/22/17
13	2012	New Delhi	India	April 30 – May 7, 2012	21	Wenjie Yao (China)	43.60/50	Shang Liu (China)		Wenjie Yao (China)		35/31/25/19
14	2013	Bogor	Indonesia	May 5–13, 2013	20	Himawan Wicaksono Winarto (Indonesia)	35.90/50	Bo Chen (China)		Himawan Wicaksono Winarto (Indonesia)		24/20/17/13
15	2014	Singapore	Singapore	May 11–19, 2014	27	Sun Yudong (China)	45.50/50	Chang Cyuan-Han (Taiwan)		Zhang Jingyun (China)		40/34/29/22
16	2015	Hangzhou	China	May 3–11, 2015	25	Jinchao Zhao (China)	48.00/50	Jinchao Zhao (China)		Jinchao Zhao (China)		30/26/21/16
17	2016	Hong Kong	China	May 1–9, 2016	27	Tiancheng Zhang (China)	48.90/50	Tiancheng Zhang (China)		Peng Chen (China)		38/33/28/21
18	2017	Yakutsk	Russia	May 1–9, 2017	24	Yaozheng Zhu (China)	44.45/50	Yaozheng Zhu (China)	26.25/30	Yaozheng Zhu (China) Vasily Yugov (Russia)	18.20/20	26/23/19/14
19	2018	Hanoi	Vietnam	May 5–15, 2018	25	Chen Tianyang (China)	39.07/50	Xu Yizhou (China)		Grigorii Bobkov (Russia)		24/21/17/13
20	2019	Adelaide	Australia	May 5–13, 2019	23	Grigorii Bobkov (Russia)	33.40/50	Ruoyu Yan (China)	23.90/30	Rassul Magauin (Kazakhstan)	12.60/20	28/25/20/16
	2020	Not held due to the COVID-19 pandemic										
21	2021	Taipei (online)	Taiwan	May 17–24, 2021	26	Manh Quan Nguyen (Vietnam)	33.85/50	Matvei Kniazev (Russia)	16.60/30	Manh Quan Nguyen (Vietnam)	17.85/20	22/19/16/12
22	2022	Dehradun (online)	India	May 21–31, 2022	27	Fredy Yip (Australia)	47.60/50	Li Yitang (China)	28.70/30	Fredy Yip (Australia)	19.40/20	42/36/30/23
23	2023	Ulaanbaatar	Mongolia	May 22–30, 2023	24	Chengchao Lang (China)	33.50/50	Chengchao Lang (China)	23.60/30	Egor Potapov (Russia)	13.40/20	19/16/13/10
24	2024	Kampar	Malaysia	June 3–10, 2024	28	Alexandru Momoiu (Romania – Guest Team) Qian Kunxiao (China)	45.55/50 43.20/50	Pan Haoyang (China)	29.80/30	Alexandru Momoiu (Romania – Guest Team) Qian Kunxiao (China)	16.60/20 15.80/20	37/35/30/24
25	2025	Dhahran	Saudi Arabia	May 4–12, 2025	30	Hyeokjoon Lee (South Korea)	38.16/50	Chen Honghua (China) Niu Weiran (China)	30.00/30	Hyeokjoon Lee (South Korea)	8.26/20	29/23/16/8
26	2026	Busan	South Korea	May 17–25, 2026	27	Yuanke Li (China)	48.90/50	Yuanke Li (China) Yukai Zhang (China) Lincoln Liu (Hong Kong)	30.00/30	Yuanke Li (China)	18.90/20	38/30/23/16
27	2027	Nakhon Ratchasima	Thailand									

== See also ==
- International Physics Olympiad
