= Bang Phongphang =

Sub-district in Bangkok, Thailand

Coordinates: 13°40′44.61″N 100°31′44.72″E

Bang Phongphang บางโพงพาง
- Khwaeng
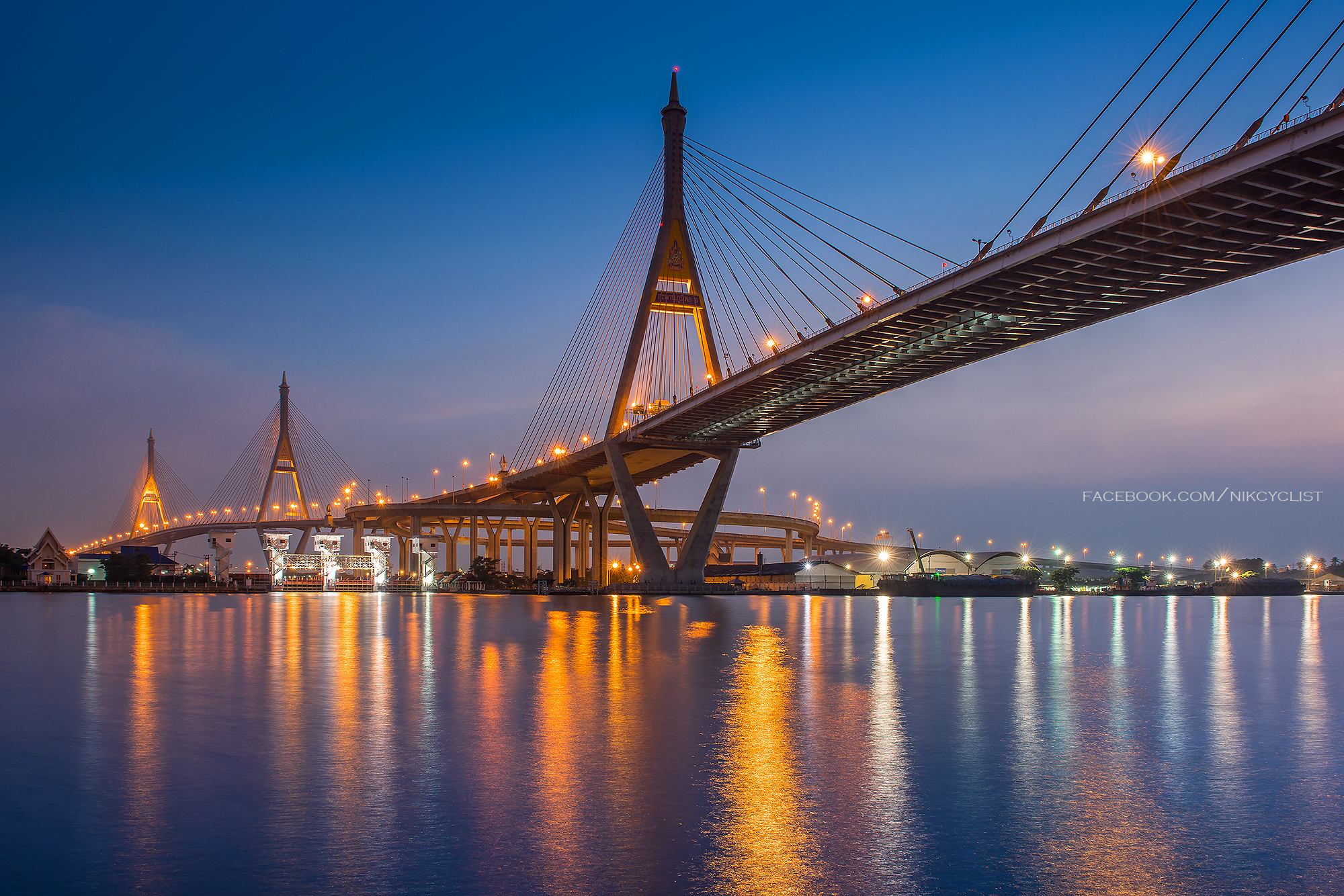
- Bhumibol Bridge or Mega Bridge viewed from Bang Phongphang side

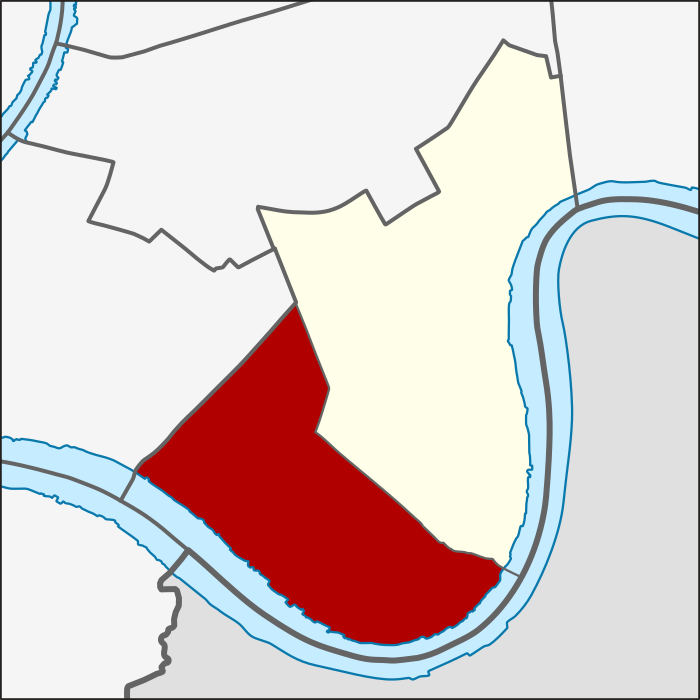
- Location in Yan Nawa District
- Country: Thailand
- Province: Bangkok
- Khet: Yan Nawa

Area
  - Total: 6.678 km^{2} (2.578 sq mi)

Population (2020)
  - Total: 28,692
- Time zone: UTC+7 (ICT)
- Postal code: 10120
- TIS 1099: 101204

Bang Phongphang (Thai: บางโพงพาง, pronounced [bāːŋ pʰōːŋ.pʰāːŋ]) is one of the two khwaengs (sub-districts) of Yan Nawa District, Bangkok, apart from Chong Nonsi. In December 2018 it had a population of 29,754 people, with total area of 6.678 km^{2} (2.5784 mi^{2}). The sub-district is also divided into seven communities.

== Geography ==
Neighboring sub-districts are (from north clockwise) Thung Wat Don of Sathon District, Chong Nonsi, Bang Yo of Phra Pradaeng District (Samut Prakan Province), Rat Burana of Rat Burana District (across Chao Phraya River), and Bang Khlo of Bang Kho Laem District.

== Naming ==
Since the area of Yan Nawa is next to the Chao Phraya River, people who live there are closely related to fishing in the river. Fishing equipment that people had used is called phongphang. The areas where people often used phongphang is near Khlong Lat Luang, Khlong Lat Pho, Khlong Song Khanong, Khlong Lat Thong Khung in Phra Pradaeng District of Samut Prakan Province and the area in front of Bang Phongphang School (which is now Chao Phraya Wittayakom School) which is near Wat Dan and Pak Khlong Mai.

Phongphang is a fishing tool consisting of main poles with net spreading over. There are two ears at the edge of the net and the other two ears under the net and need to be pressed onto the ground. A stick for pressing the net is called mai krachio (ไม้กระจิว). Mai krachio is a tool used for pressing the net onto the ground. It looks similarly to a net but there is an opening part at the bottom. It is around 10–16 wa (วา) or 20–32 m.

== Places ==
- Bhumibol Bridge
- Rama IX Bridge
- Thotsamarachan Bridge (Rama IX Parallel Bridge)
- King’s College International School Bangkok
- Int-Intersect Rama3
- Chao Phraya Wittayakom School
- Wat Dan
- Wat Pariwat
- Sathu Pradit Pier
- Sathu Pradit Intersection
