= Wat Bhoman Khunaram =

- วัดโพธิ์แมนคุณาราม (Thai) 普門報恩寺 (Chinese)
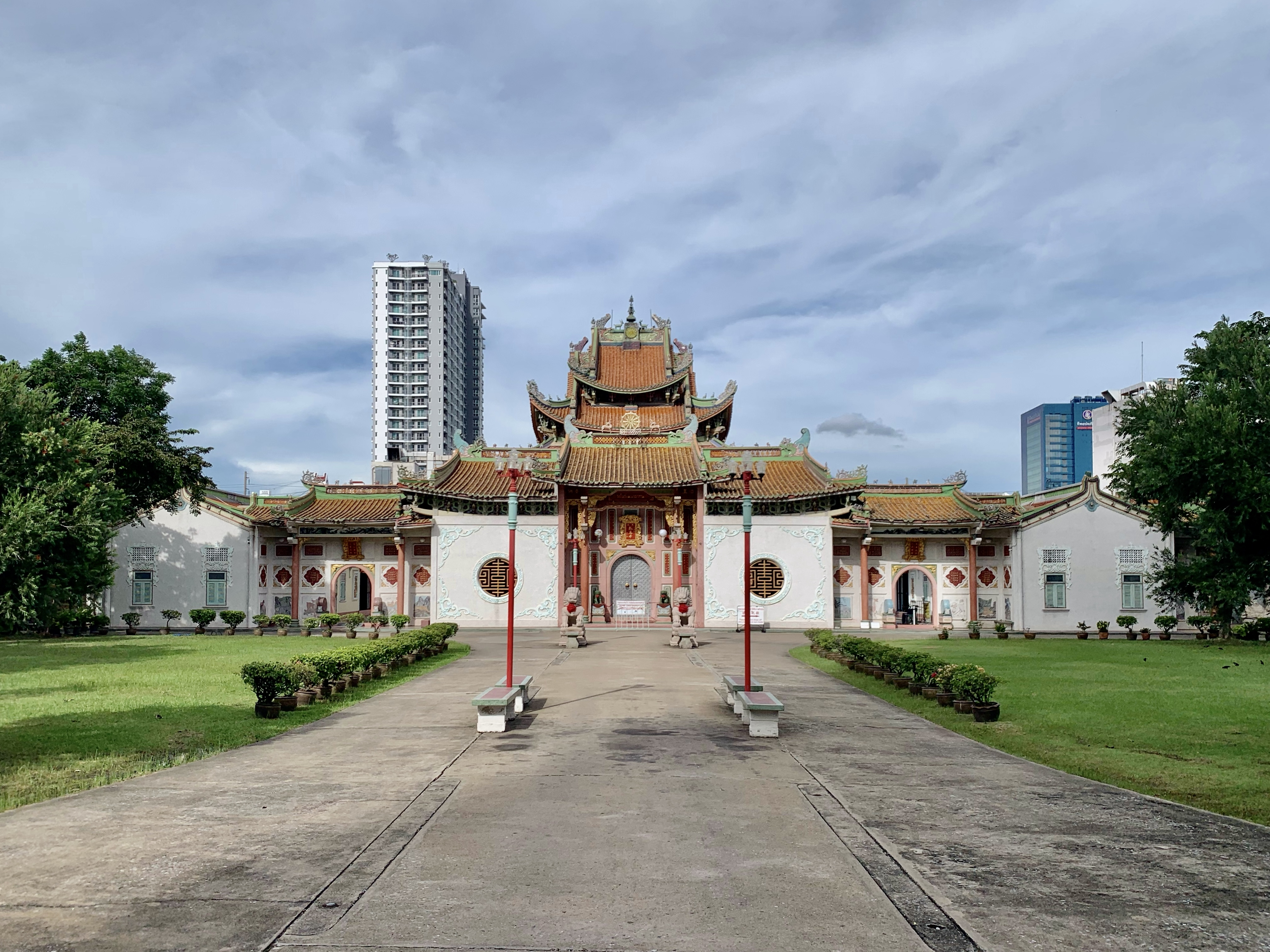
- Façade of the temple

- Location within Bangkok

Religion
- Affiliation: Buddhism (Mahayana: Chinese Nikaya)

Location
- Location: 321 Soi Sathu Pradit 19, Sathu Pradit rd, Chong Nonsi, Yan Nawa, Bangkok 10120
- Country: Thailand
- Coordinates: 13.701111°N 100.540278°E

Architecture
- Founder: Phra Maha Arjan Dhamma Samatiwat (Pho Cheng Maha Thera)
- Completed: 1970

Wat Bhoman Khunaram (also written as Wat Pho Maen Khunaram, Thai: วัดโพธิ์แมนคุณาราม, Chinese: 普門報恩寺, pinyin: pǔ mén bào'ēn sì) is a Chinese Buddhist temple in Bangkok, Thailand.

== Overview ==
It is a Mahāyāna Buddhist temple affiliated with the Chinese Buddhist Sangha in Thailand. The principles and teachings are inherited from Zen sect, Lin-Chi school (vipassanā meditation). The temple is also practices the teachings of the Vinaya as well as Tibetan Vajrayana.

Moreover, it is the administrative centre for the Chinese Buddhist Sangha in Thailand and propagating the teachings of Mahāyāna Buddhism and Vajrayana. The temple is also a source of data on Mahāyāna Buddhism of Thailand.

== History ==
The plant of the temple began in 1959, Phra Maha Arjan Dhamma Samatiwat (Pho Cheng Maha Thera), the sixth former dean of Chinese sect in Thailand was the leader for construction along with the group of senior officials, affluents, people as well as Thai and Chinese Buddhists. The foundation stone laying ceremony was performed on 5 December 1960, King Bhumibol Adulyadej (Rama IX)'s 33rd birthday.

The area of the temple is 4.7 acres and the funds of about 30 million baht were used for construction. It was royally granted Visungamasima (วิสุงคามสีมา, "the land or space given by the king to monks for use in building a temple") on 24 January 1970.

The king came to perform the ceremony of rising a tiered umbrella to be placed on the ordination hall. He also granted the placement of his royal initials Phor Por Ror (ภ.ป.ร.) at the gable of the ordination hall. In 1917, he graciously named the principle Buddha image, Phra Buddha Vachara Bodihikhun. In the same year, Supreme Patriarch (Uttayee Mahathera) conferred the status of excellent development temple too.

Besides, the certificate from the Department of Religious Affairs was bestowed on the dean of Chinese sect for construction and development until this has become an exemplary temple.
