= Wat Pariwat =

Buddhist temple in Bangkok, Thailand

Wat Pariwat Ratchasongkram
- Wat Pariwat
- The ubosot

- Location within Bangkok

Religion
- Affiliation: Buddhism
- Sect: Theravāda Mahā Nikāya
- Status: Civil temple

Location
- Location: 737 Soi Rama III 30, Rama III rd, Bang Phongphang, Yan Nawa, Bangkok 10120
- Country: Thailand
- Coordinates: 13.673877°N 100.533387°E

Architecture
- Founder: Phraya Phetpichai; Phraya Ratchasongkram

Wat Pariwat Ratchasongkram (Thai: วัดปริวาสราชสงคราม), also known as Wat Pariwat, is a Buddhist temple in Yan Nawa district, Bangkok, Thailand.

== History ==
Formerly, this place was probably a house of priest or a small temple only. Wealthy people in the past had preference for building the temples. The construction was estimated to be around the late Ayutthaya period to early Rattanakosin era. Subsequently, during the reigns of King Rama I to Rama II, the available evidence indicates that Krommuen Sakphon Sena (กรมหมื่นศักดิ์พลเสนา) had got Phraya Phetpichai (พระยาเพชรพิชัย) to build the temple at the edge of Khlong Lud Luang canal on the western side.

According to the evidence, people of his ancestry were master craftsmen in succession. Phraya Phetpichai was a chief responsible for the construction of Nakhon Khuan Khan (นครเขื่อนขันธ์, present-day Phra Pradaeng) and the temple there until becoming well known. Upon the completion of construction, that temple was royally named Wat Phichayon Phonlasep (วัดไพชยนต์พลเสพย์).

Phraya Phetpichai was a devout Buddhist with determination to build the temple as a memorial. Therefore, he asked for permission to build another temple opposite Wat Phichayon Phonlasep, which was given the name Wat Prod Ket Chettaram (วัดโปรดเกศเชษฐาราม). Both of them were royal temples.

Another key leader responsible for the construction of these two temples was Phraya Ratchasongkram (พระยาราชสงคราม). The letter was skilled at constructing and designing the palaces and temples with strong faith in Buddhism as well. Both of them collaborated on the construction of Wat Phichayon Phonlasep and Wat Prod Ket Chettaram was in very poor condition. So they renovated it until it became beautiful and named this Wat Pariwat Ratchasongkram based on his title at the end of this temple's name.

== Highlights ==
Wat Pariwat ubosot inner temple

At present, Wat Pariwat is internationally known as a monastery with unusual buildings with a unique architectural style. The examples are ubosot (ordination hall), benjarong (Thai porcelain with designs in five colours) stucco sculptures with characteristic of international contemporary art including the pictures ranging from god, deity, angel, hermit, giant, demon, various creatures to key characters in the classical epics like Ramakien (Thai version of Ramayana), Romance of the Three Kingdoms, The Legend of the Condor Heroes, cowboy, Viking, King Arthur, pharaoh, samurai, red Indians, One Piece, Dragon Ball etc.

This was intended by the creators to be the artwork that reflects the period. In this regard, the statues were designed to symbolize the recorded events of the period, conveying that people could respect and uphold Buddhism, regardless of race, religion.

Besides, there is the statue of world class footballer David Beckham at the ubosot base known as unseen in Thailand too.

== Location ==
Wat Pariwat Temple Dragon, Bangkok, Thailand

Wat Pariwat is lined on the riverside of Chao Phraya on Phra Nakhon side (Bangkok core) in the area of Bang Phongphang. Since the temple is next to the Chao Phraya, it has picturesque scenery. It is also a suitable place for feeding or releasing fish to make merit.

== Transportation ==
The temple is easily accessible by many BMTA buses, such as lines 4-47, 205, and is also served by the Wat Pariwat station (B7) of the Bangkok BRT, whose Sathorn–Ratchaphruek route runs along Rama III road.
