= Rama III Road =

Street in Bangkok, Thailand

Coordinates: 13.687784°N 100.517251°E

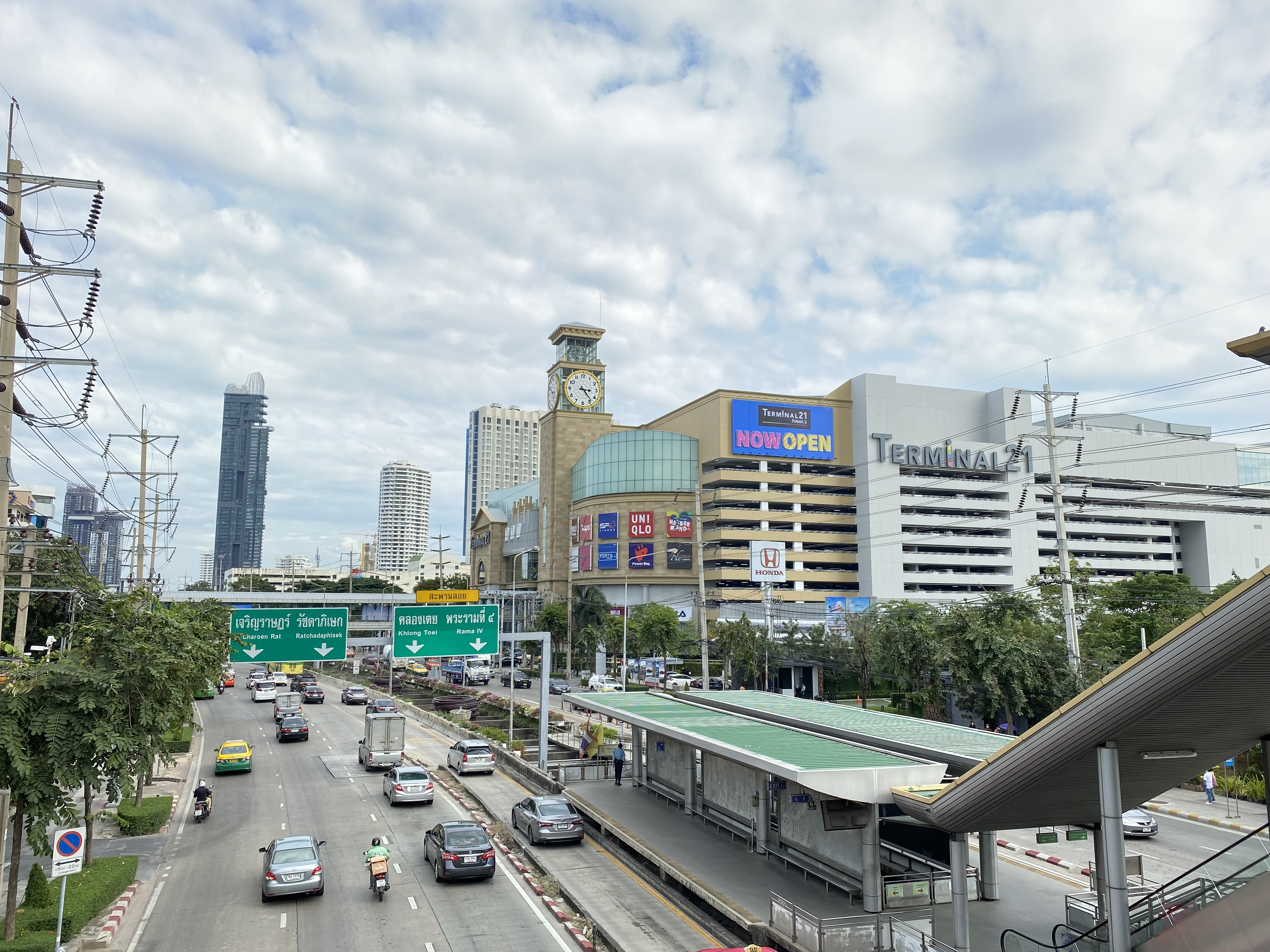
Rama III Road and Charoenrat BRT station

Rama III Road (Thai: ถนนพระรามที่ 3, RTGS: Thanon Phra Ram Thi Sam; usually shortened to ถนนพระราม 3) is a main road in inner Bangkok. The 12 km (7.5 mi) long road runs along the bend of Chao Phraya River on the Phra Nakhon side (Bangkok core).

== Route ==
Rama III Road starts from the foot of Krungthep Bridge in Thanon Tok quarter where it intersects with Mahai Sawan and the last section of Charoen Krung Roads in the area of Bang Kho Laem District. It then runs eastward up till Nang Linchi Junction, where it crosses Nang Linchi Road in front of Wat Chong Lom temple, and then northeastward across Chuea Phloeng Road and Eastern Railway Line (Mae Nam Branch) from nearby Mae Nam Railway Station on the periphery of Yannawa and Khlong Toei Districts, and then enters Khlong Toei area. It ends at Na Ranong Square, the five-way intersection of Sunthonkosa, Ratchadaphisek and Na Ranong Roads near Khlong Toei Market and PAT Stadium.

The bus rapid transit, Bangkok BRT (Sathon–Ratchaphruek route) operates with six stations (Rama III Bridge, Charoenrat, Rama IX Bridge, Wat Dokmai, Wat Pariwat, Wat Dan) on this road.

Rama III is a road that connects to many main roads, including Ratchadaphisek, Sathu Pradit, Rama IV, Sathon, Chan, Naradhiwas Rajanagarindra Roads, as well as Bhumibol Bridge (Mega Bridge), etc.

Rama III Bridge (widely known as Krungthep II Bridge or New Krungthep Bridge) carries the road as well.

== History ==
Rama III Road was built before the 1997 financial crisis when the Thai government wanted to expand the commercial zone from Silom Road to a new location. Many businessmen and investors built high-rise buildings and port warehouses along the road, such as CentralPlaza Rama III, Bank of Ayudhya Headquarters, Bangkok Bank, Rama III Office and IT Division. Many of these buildings have been abandoned because of the crisis.

It was named in honour of Nangklao (Rama III), the third sovereign of Chakri dynasty, who was regarded as an expert in merchanting, to match the road history and its condition. In the past, merchant ships cruised along the river and Thanon Tok Port was considered the main port of the Siamese capital.
