= Thanon Tok =

Road junction in Bangkok, Thailand

Coordinates: 13°41′49.79″N 100°29′49.32″E

Thanon Tok (Thai: ถนนตก, pronounced [tʰā.nǒn tòk]) is a road junction in the Bang Kho Laem Subdistrict, Bang Kho Laem District, Bangkok. It is the point where Charoen Krung, Rama III and Mahaisawan Roads meet. The boundaries of the junction are considered to be where Charoen Krung and Mahaisawan Roads terminate, and where Rama III Road begins.

The name "Thanon Tok" means "road to fall" because it is the final stretch of Charoen Krung Road to the south, running directly south and dead-ending at the Chao Phraya River. The name came into colloquial use due to this characteristic. Originally, it served as a main port of Bangkok called "Thanon Tok Pier" before the establishment of Bangkok Port, and was also the location of the Bangkok Dock Company. In addition to being a commercial pier, it also functioned as a passenger terminal for motorized ferries transporting people between Bangkok and Phra Pradaeng in Samut Prakan, as well as within Bangkok. Later, as water transport and river trade declined in importance and Bangkok Port was relocated to its present site in Khlong Toei, Thanon Tok Pier became a freight-only pier.

Government facilities in the area include Charoenkrung Pracharak Hospital, a public hospital operated by the Bangkok Metropolitan Administration (BMA), and the Yan Nawa office of the Metropolitan Electricity Authority (MEA), where one of Bangkok's former trams is preserved as a local attraction. The Bang Kho Laem Line of the Bangkok trams once terminated here at Thanon Tok.

Bangkok Mass Transit Authority (BMTA) bus line 1 (Note: Today, the service is operated only by private concessionaires using minibuses and air-conditioned buses, but the route remains unchanged.) is the only route that travels the full length of Charoen Krung Road, from Thanon Tok to Tha Tian in the old town zone of Rattanakosin Island. The total distance, 12 km (7.5 mi), made it the shortest route in the system as of 2002.

The southern end of Charoen Krung Road, from Trok Chan to Thanon Tok, is known for its large Muslim community. As a result, many mosques are located in the area, including Masjid Darul Abideen, Masjid Al Bayaan, Masjid Bang Uthit and Masjid Assalafiyah. The ancestors of these communities migrated from Java and the Malay Peninsula during the reign of King Buddha Yodfa Chulaloke (Rama I) in the early Rattanakosin period (18th century).

A 2016 survey found that the area stretching from Thanon Tok to Surawong Road, covering parts of Bang Rak, Si Phraya, and Suriyawong Subdistricts in Bang Rak District, was among the most congested traffic zones in Bangkok. During the morning rush hour, it ranked third, with an average speed of just 10.6 km/h. In the evening rush hour, it ranked first, with an average speed of only 8.8 km/h.

In addition, Thanon Tok is also the point where construction of the Inner Ring Road, more commonly known as Ratchadaphisek Road, began. King Bhumibol Adulyadej (Rama IX) presided over the opening ceremony of the construction on 8 June 1972. Today, this section forms the beginning of Rama III Road.
