= Sathu Pradit Road =

Street in Thailand

Coordinates: 13°40′39.5″N 100°31′40.2″E

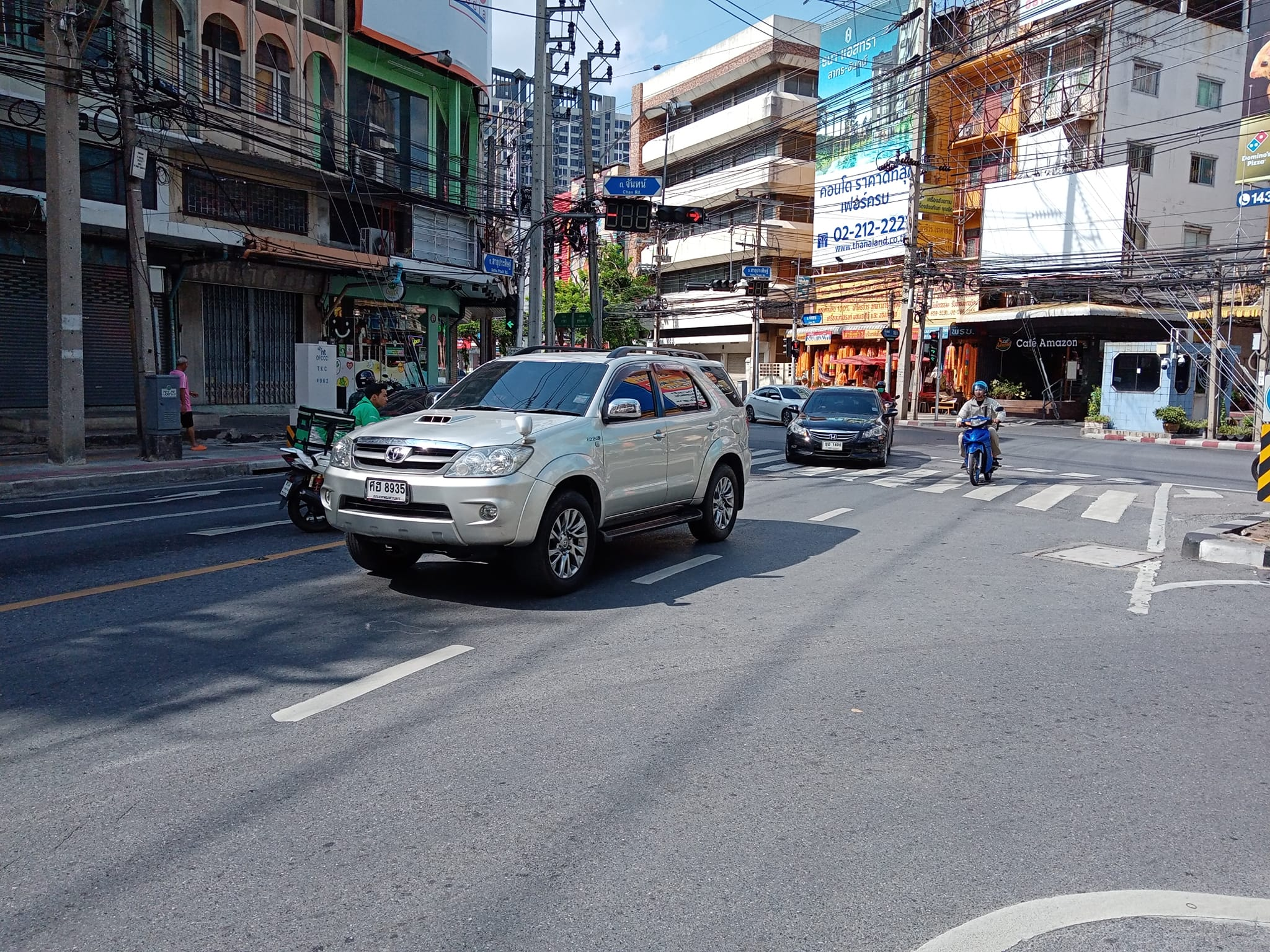
The beginning of Sathu Pradit Road.

Sathu Pradit Road (Thai: ถนนสาธุประดิษฐ์, pronounced [tʰā.nǒn sāː.tʰú.prà.dìt]), generally referred simply as Sathu Pradit (สาธุประดิษฐ์) is a road in Bangkok.

== Route ==
Sathu Pradit is a four-lane road, beginning from Chan Road at the Sathu-Chan intersection in Thung Wat Don, Sathon district. It runs southeast towards Bang Phongphang, Yan Nawa district, intersecting with Ratchadaphisek Road, and Rama III Road at the Sathu Pradit intersection.

It terminates at the Sathu Pradit pier on the Chao Phraya river.

== History ==
The first road built in Yan Nawa district, Sathu Pradit Road was constructed by Tuan Sathu, a local gardener and landowner. He had the idea of constructing the road by removing an existing canal and filling it with dirt to become a passable dirt road in 1925. When completed, Sathu Pradit road extended from Bridge 4 (Chan road) to Ton Tal curve (near Soi Sathu Pradit 41 in current time).

In 1968, there was another road which was constructed by locals. It was a red dirt road that crossed from Khlong Poom garden through Wat Chong Nonsi to Pae Ta market. It was called "Thanon Daeng" (ถนนแดง, lit. 'red road'). Now it is called Soi Nak Suwan (ซอยนาคสุวรรณ), also formally known as Soi Nonsi 14 (ซอยนนทรี 14).

When Anake Priyanont was Yan Nawa district director (1957–1960), a public hearing was conducted at the Wat Dok Mai to discuss road construction. The community suggested construction a footpath from Soi Sathu Pradit 34 to Sathu Pradit road to assist transporting agricultural products to market.

But, the government did not approve the footpath construction but approved a six-meter-wide concrete road instead. Unfortunately, this plan created issues of encroachment of some people's estates. Thus, the development was changed to become a concrete Sathu Pradit road construction project, from the starting of Chan Road Bridge 4 to Ton Tal curve was purchased. This included some land belonging to Khun Ying Boonmee Bururachrangsan who was landlord of Public Health Henter 7 Boonmee Bururachrangsan area.

Currently, a memorial has been erected in memory of Tuan Sathu at the entrance of Soi Sathu Pradit 20.
