= Bangkok Metropolitan Administration General Hospital =

Hospital in Thailand

Bangkok Metropolitan Administration General Hospital โรงพยาบาลกลาง
- Medical Service Department, Bangkok Metropolitan Administration

Geography
- Location: 514 Luang Road, Pom Prap Subdistrict, Pom Prap Sattru Phai District, Bangkok 10100, Thailand

Organisation
- Type: Teaching
- Affiliated university: School of Medicine, Mae Fah Luang University; Faculty of Medicine Siriraj Hospital, Mahidol University

Services
- Beds: 500

History
- Founded: 1898

Links
- Website: www.klanghospital.go.th
- Lists: Hospitals in Thailand

Bangkok Metropolitan Administration (BMA) General Hospital, commonly known as Klang Hospital (Thai: โรงพยาบาลกลาง, lit. 'Central Hospital') is a public tertiary hospital in Thailand located on corner of the Luang and Suea Pa Roads, Pom Prap Subdistrict, Pom Prap Sattru Phai District, Bangkok. Klang Hospital is a public hospital operated by the Medical Service Department, Bangkok Metropolitan Administration (BMA), and is regarded as one of the oldest hospitals in Thailand. It is an affiliated hospital of the School of Medicine, Mae Fah Luang University and the Faculty of Medicine Siriraj Hospital, Mahidol University.

== History ==
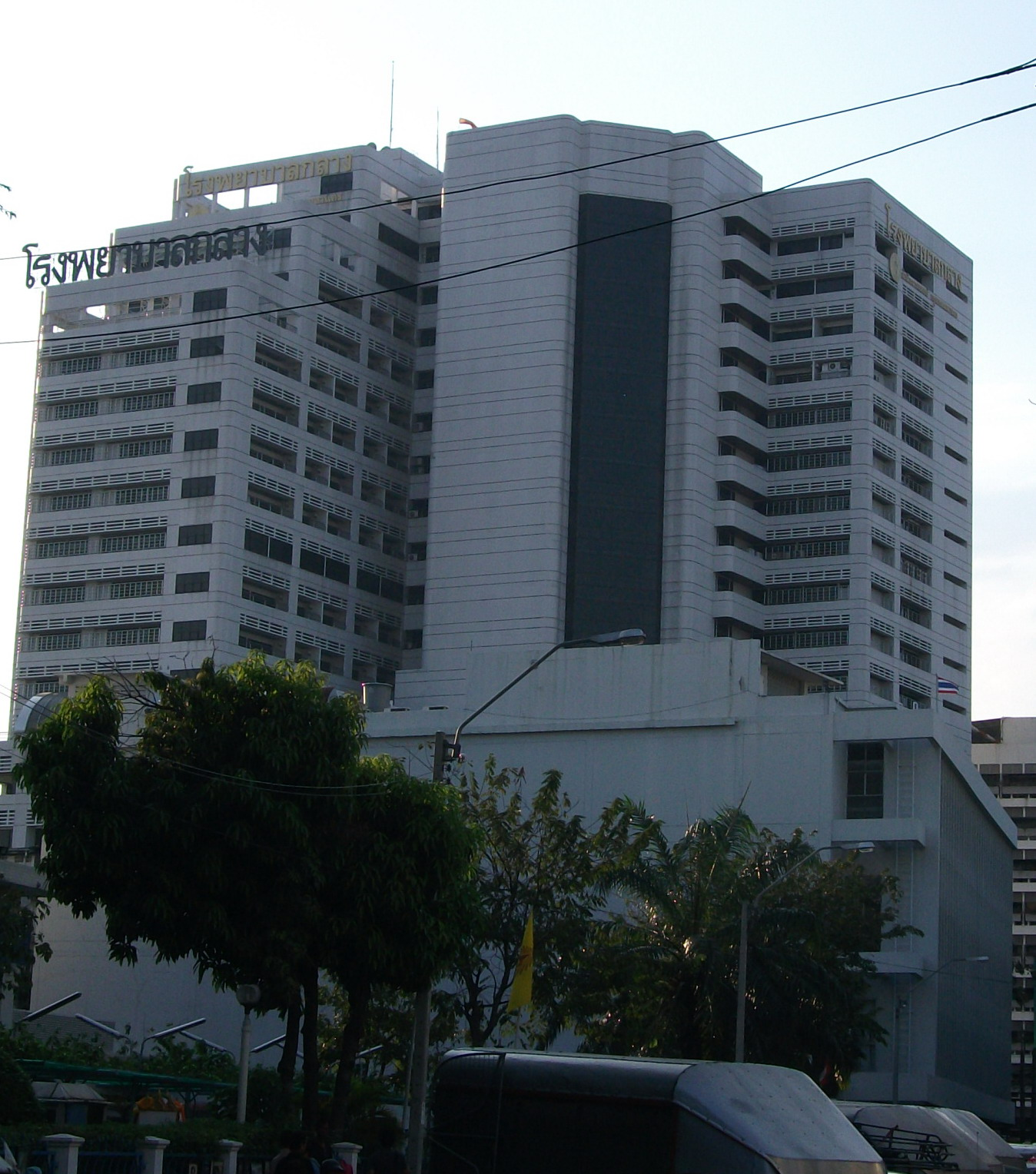
Klang Hospital in early 2010

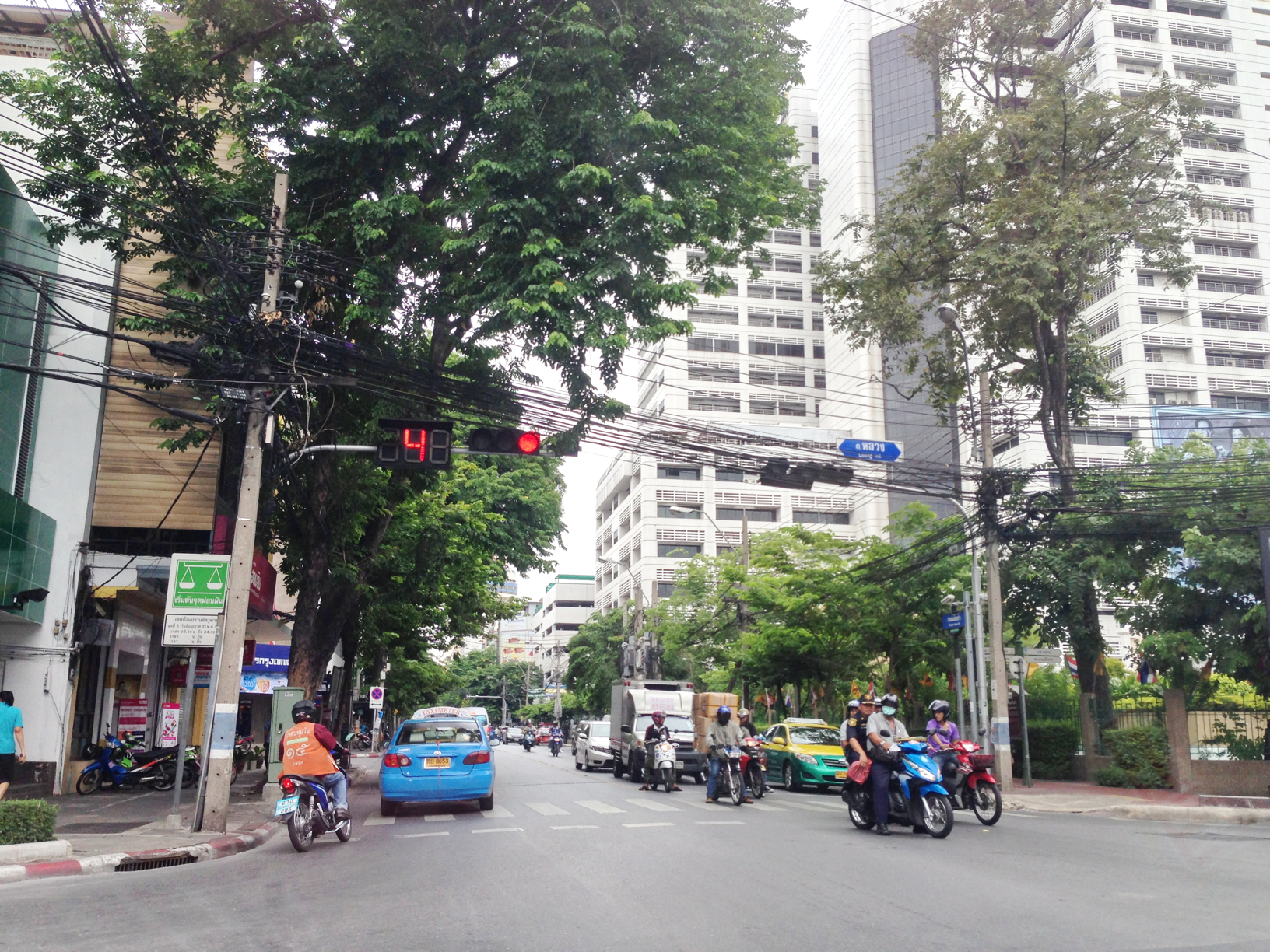
The point where Luang intersects with Suea Pa Roads (white building is Klang Hospital)

The hospital was established in 1898 with the royal permission of King Chulalongkorn (Rama V) for the aim of providing of services for large number prostitutes in this area (Chinatown and Phlapphla Chai) in order to prevent the spread of epidemics. The following year, the building was assigned to the Royal Thai Police, and became the Patrol Hospital. During this time, it provided medical services to police officers and conducted autopsies from various cases. At the same time, 36 beds were added for the treatment of prostitutes, following its initial intended purpose. In 1915, the hospital was reassigned to the Medical Services Division of the Ministry of Interior. Eventually, operations were transferred to the BMA.

On 13 June 2012, the Medical Services Department of the BMA signed an agreement to train medical students of the School of Medicine, Mae Fah Luang University at the hospital under the Collaborative Project to Increase Rural Doctor (CPIRD) Program. Along with Charoenkrung Pracharak Hospital in Bang Kho Laem District, both hospitals form the Medical Education Center of the Medical Services Department, Bangkok Metropolitan Administration (MEC MSD BMA).

== See also ==
- Health in Thailand
- Healthcare in Thailand
- Hospitals in Thailand
