= Mahai Sawan Road =

Road in Bangkok, Thailand

Coordinates: 13°42′16.93″N 100°29′08.43″E

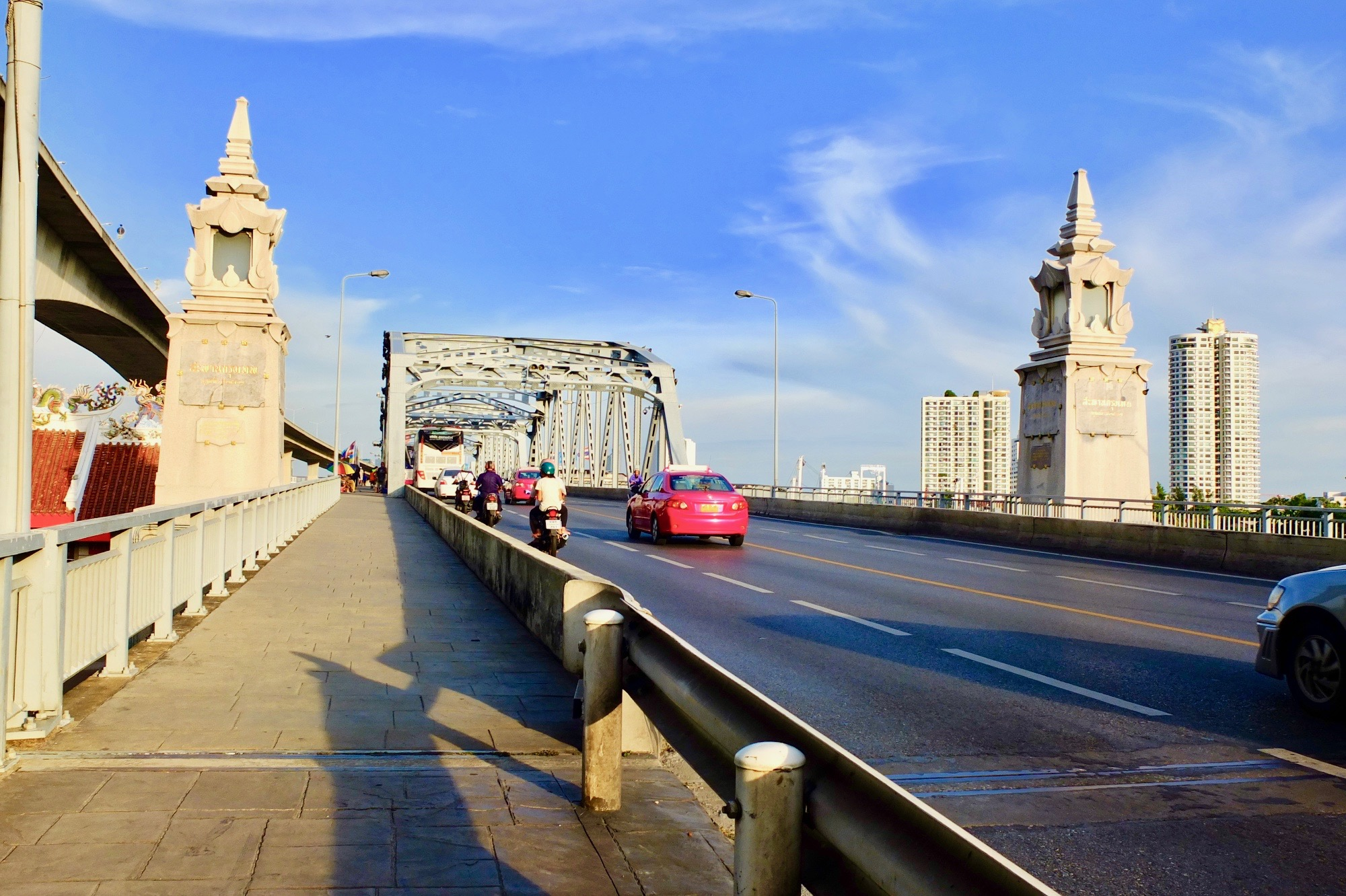
Krungthep bridge carry the Mahai Sawan road across Chao Phraya River from Thonburi (west bank) to Phra Nakhon sides (east bank)

Mahai Sawan Road (Thai: ถนนมไหสวรรย์, RTGS: Thanon Mahai Sawan, pronounced [tʰā.nǒn mā.hǎj.sā.wǎn]) is a short road and intersection in Bangkok. It runs from Mahai Sawan intersection in Thon Buri District through Bukkhalo intersection and Krungthep Bridge across Chao Phraya River to Phra Nakhon side (east bank of the river) and ends at Thanon Tok, connecting Charoen Krung Road and Rama III Road in Bang Kho Laem District.

It was named after the first governor of Thonburi province (now Thonburi), Mahai Sawan (พระยามไหสวรรย์) or Ko Sombatsiri (กอ สมบัติศิริ).

Mahai Sawan intersection is four-way connecting Somdet Phra Chao Tak Sin, Ratchadaphisek and Mahai Sawan roads beneath Rama III Bridge. Its original appearance was only three-way but, later on, Ratchadaphisek Road was expanded to become a four-lane like today. This intersection is considered one of the most traffic-congested routes of Bangkok. On September 30, 2016, a tunnel underpass was opened, fifteen years after the project was initially planned. The tunnel is 1,515 m (0.9 mi) long, the longest underpass in Bangkok, with four lanes. The total cost of the tunnel was about 969 million baht since the work begun in 2011.
