= Bang Kho Laem subdistrict =

Bang Kho Laem บางคอแหลม
- Khwaeng
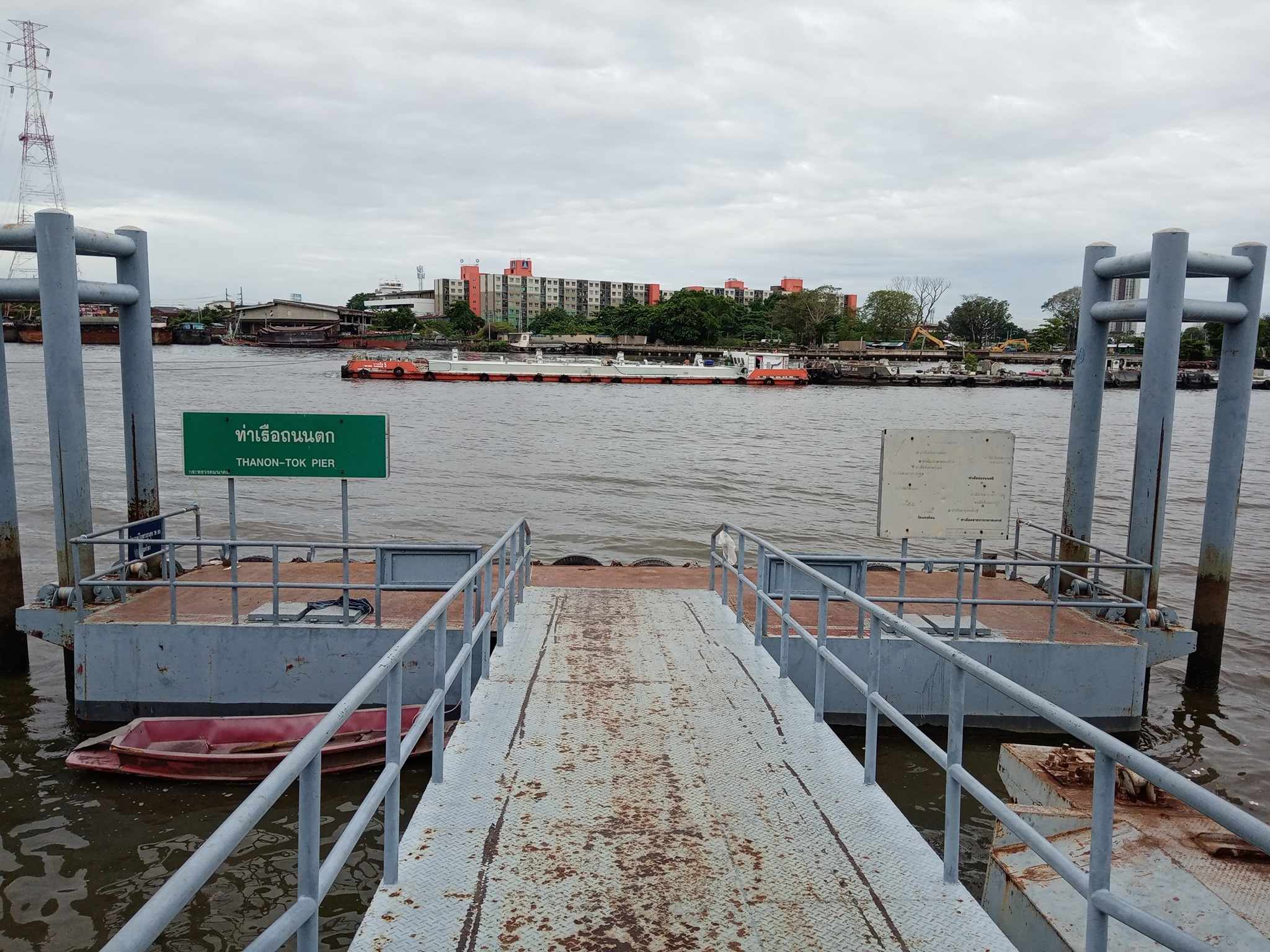
- Thanon Tok Pier, a port for loading and unloading goods at the end of Charoen Krung Road, where it is referred to as Thanon Tok

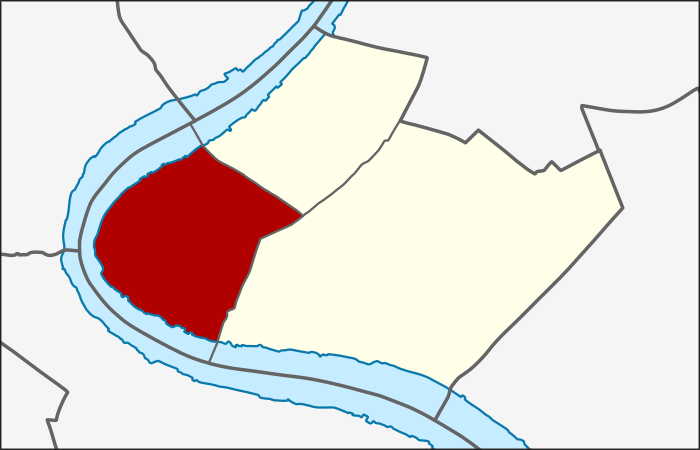
- Location in Bang Kho Laem District
- Country: Thailand
- Province: Bangkok
- Khet: Bang Kho Laem

Area
  - Total: 2.749 km^{2} (1.061 sq mi)

Population (2020)
  - Total: 22,697
- Time zone: UTC+7 (ICT)
- Postal code: 10120
- TIS 1099: 103101

Bang Kho Laem (Thai: บางคอแหลม, pronounced [bāːŋ kʰɔ̄ː lɛ̌ːm]) is a khwaeng (subdistrict) of Bang Kho Laem District, in Bangkok, Thailand. In 2020, it had a total population of 22,697 people.
