= Bang Khlo =

Bang Khlo บางโคล่
- Khwaeng
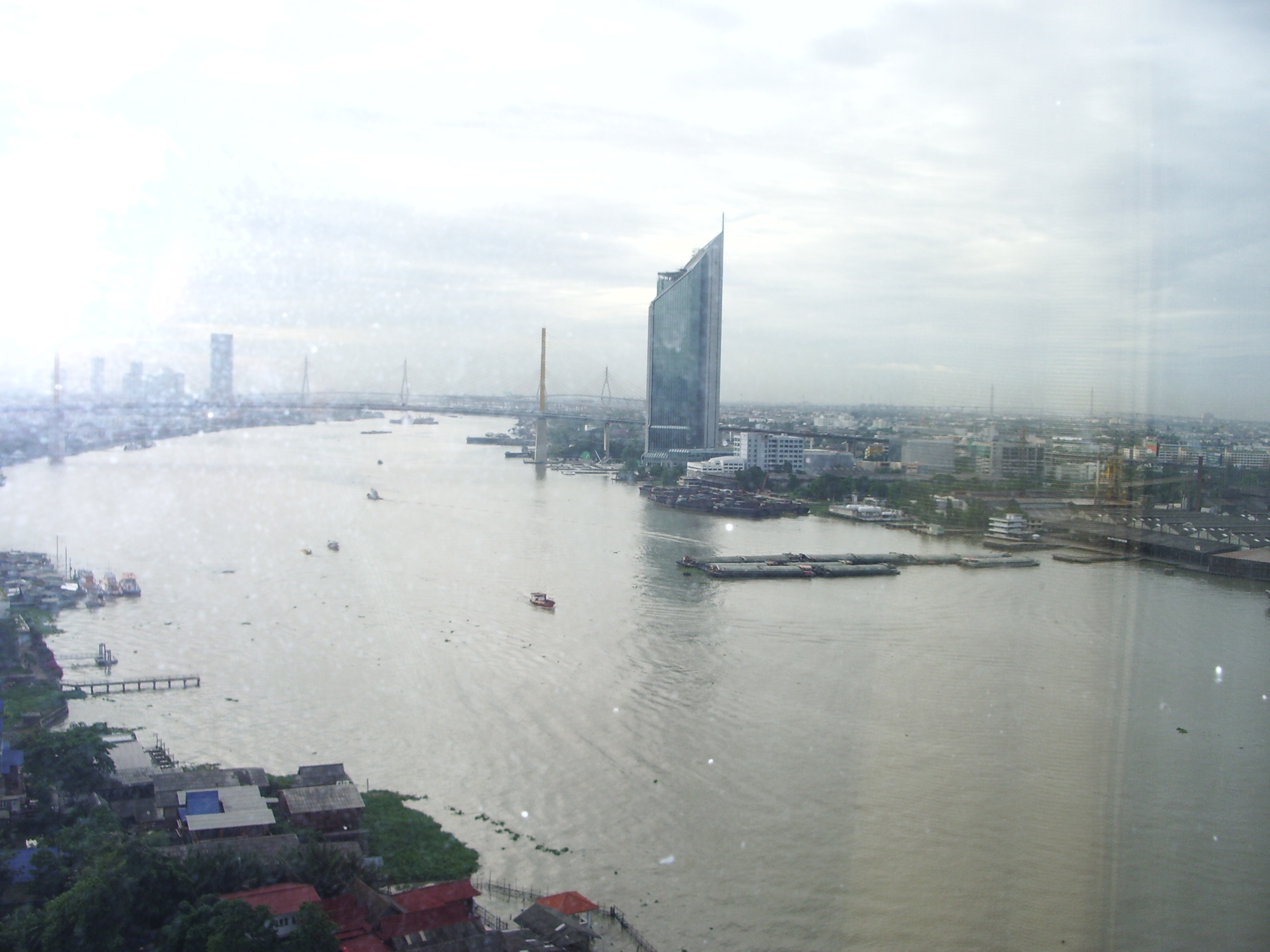
- View of the Chao Phraya from Montien Riverside Hotel in Bang Khlo

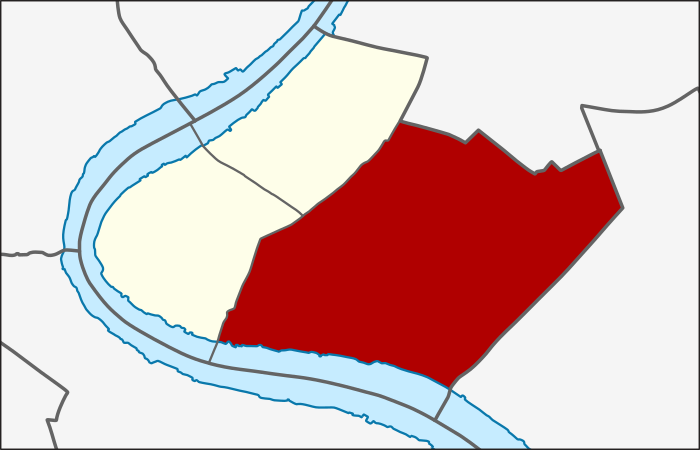
- Location in Bang Kho Laem district
- Country: Thailand
- Province: Bangkok
- Khet: Bang Kho Laem

Area
  - Total: 5.872 km^{2} (2.267 sq mi)

Population (2020)
  - Total: 35,838
- Time zone: UTC+7 (ICT)
- Postal code: 10120
- TIS 1099: 103103

Bang Khlo (Thai: บางโคล่, pronounced [bāːŋ kʰlôː]) is a khwaeng (subdistrict) of Bang Kho Laem district, in Bangkok, Thailand. In 2020, it had a total population of 35,838 people.
