= School of Medicine, Mae Fah Luang University =

Medical school in Chiang Rai

- สำนักวิชาแพทยศาสตร์ มหาวิทยาลัยแม่ฟ้าหลวง
- Type: Public (non-profit)
- Established: 18 January 2012 (as School of Medicine, Mae Fah Luang University)
- Parent institution: Mae Fah Luang University
- Dean: Prof. Supakorn Rojananin, M.D.
- Location: 333 Mu 1, Tha Sut Subdistrict, Mueang Chiang Rai District, Chiang Rai 57100, Thailand; 20.032552°N 99.880612°E
- Colors: Green
- Website: http://medicine.mfu.ac.th//index.php

The School of Medicine, Mae Fah Luang University (Thai: สำนักวิชาแพทยศาสตร์ มหาวิทยาลัยแม่ฟ้าหลวง) is a medical school in Mueang Chiang Rai District, Chiang Rai Province.

== History ==
The School of Medicine, Mae Fah Luang was established on 18 January 2012 following approval of the council of Mae Fah Luang University. The MD course was approved by the Medical Council of Thailand on 7 February 2013 and admitted 32 medical students in the 2013 academic year. Students study at the main Mae Fah Luang University campus during the preclinical years (Year 1-3) before separating to affiliated teaching hospitals in the clinical years (Year 4-6). The Mae Fah Luang University Medical Center Hospital which will become the main teaching hospital is scheduled to open in December 2019.

== Teaching Hospitals ==
=== University Hospital ===
- Mae Fah Luang University Medical Center Hospital

=== Main Hospitals ===
- BMA General Hospital, Bangkok
- Charoenkrung Pracharak Hospital, Bangkok
- Lamphun Hospital, Lamphun

=== Affiliated Hospitals ===
- Sukhothai Hospital, Sukhothai
- Srisangworn Sukhothai Hospital, Sukhothai
- Nan Hospital, Nan
- Fang Hospital, Chiang Mai

== See also ==
- List of medical schools in Thailand
