= Charoenkrung Pracharak Hospital =

Hospital in Bangkok, Thailand

Charoenkrung Pracharak Hospital โรงพยาบาลเจริญกรุงประชารักษ์
- Medical Service Department, Bangkok Metropolitan Administration

Geography
- Location: 8 Charoen Krung Road, Bang Kho Laem Subdistrict, Bang Kho Laem District, Bangkok 10120, Thailand
- Coordinates: 13.694388°N 100.494648°E

Organisation
- Type: Teaching
- Affiliated university: School of Medicine, Mae Fah Luang University; Faculty of Medicine Siriraj Hospital, Mahidol University; Phramongkutklao College of Medicine

Services
- Beds: 464

History
- Former name: Bang Kho Laem Hospital
- Founded: 25 November 1971

Links
- Website: www.ckphosp.go.th/diapo.1.0.4/diapo/homepage.html
- Lists: Hospitals in Thailand

Charoenkrung Pracharak Hospital (Thai: โรงพยาบาลเจริญกรุงประชารักษ์) is a hospital in Thailand located in Bang Kho Laem District, Bangkok. It is a public hospital operated by the Medical Service Department, Bangkok Metropolitan Administration (BMA). It is a main teaching hospital of the School of Medicine, Mae Fah Luang University and an affiliated teaching hospital for the Faculty of Medicine Siriraj Hospital, Mahidol University and Phramongkutklao College of Medicine.

== History ==
In 1967, the BMA had plans to increase healthcare access for the people of Bangkok in the growing capital. A hospital was constructed at the southern end of Charoen Krung Road on the site of the old Bangkok abattoir. The hospital initially opened for obstetrics and gynecology patients only, inasmuch as the Bang Kho Laem-Yannawa area had the highest birth rates in Bangkok, but rapidly expanded to other specialities. It officially opened as Bang Kho Laem Hospital on 25 November 1971. On 9 April 1976, the hospital was renamed to Charoenkrung Pracharak Hospital by King Bhumibol Adulyadej. The hospital became the main teaching hospital for the School of Medicine, Mae Fah Luang University in 2012 along with BMA General Hospital, both hospitals thus forming the Medical Education Center of the Medical Services Department, Bangkok Metropolitan Administration (MEC MSD BMA).

== See also ==
- Health in Thailand
- Healthcare in Thailand
- Hospitals in Thailand
