= Khlong Lat Pho =

Coordinates: 13.666909°N 100.539328°E

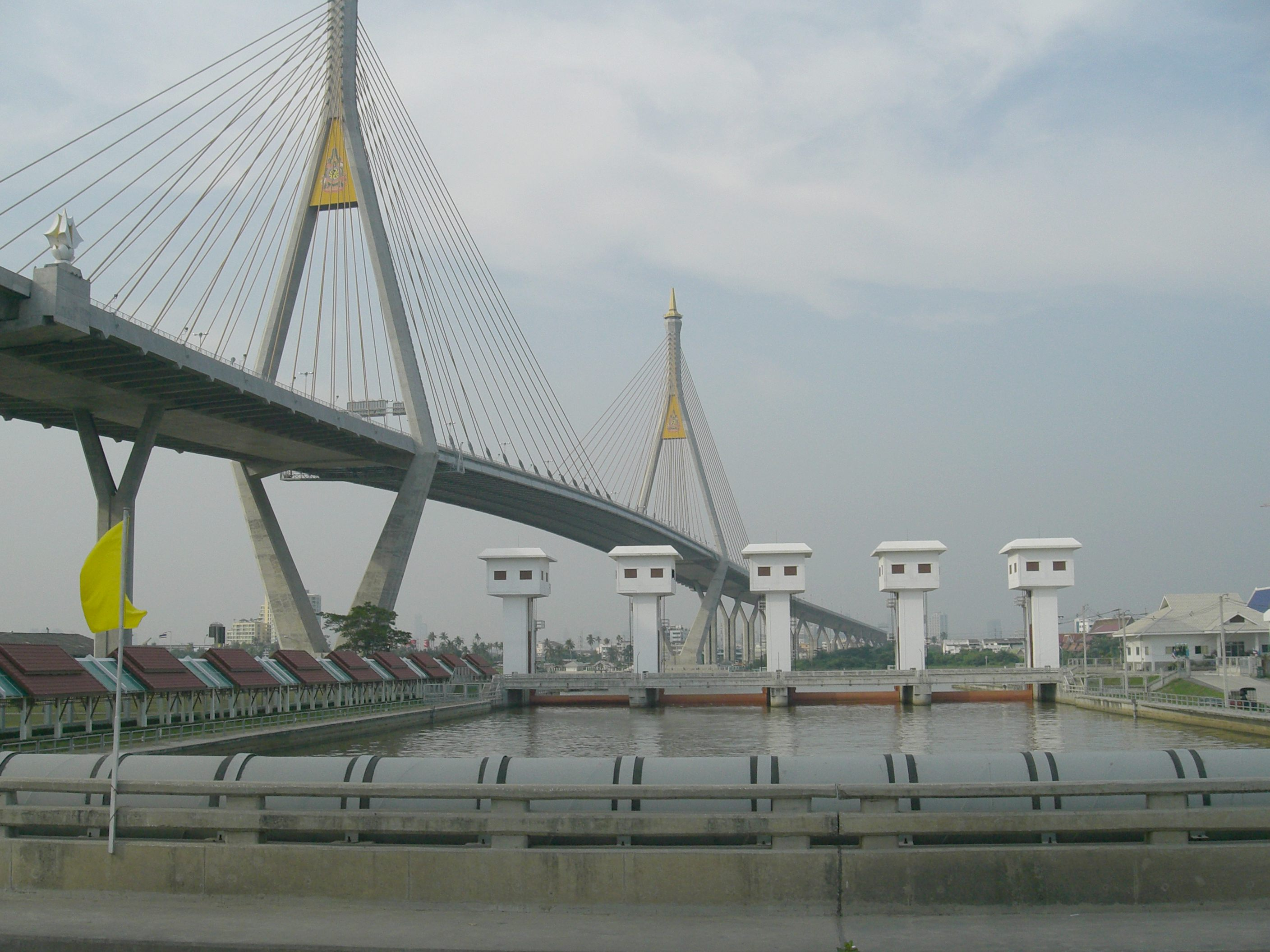
Khlong Lat Pho

Khlong Lat Pho (Thai: คลองลัดโพธิ์, pronounced [kʰlɔ̄ːŋ lát pʰōː]) is a waterway in form of khlong (canal) in the area of Bang Kachao, connecting Bangkok and the neighbouring province of Samut Prakan. It was dug during the King Tai Sa's reign of Ban Phlu Luang dynasty in the late Ayutthaya period. The canal was used as a travel route for underclass, as well as a thoroughfare for kings when they went fishing in Samut Prakan. It was also a route for transporting troops and equipment in the early Rattanakosin period.

Khlong Lat Pho currently serves as a shortcut to quickly sluice water from northern Thailand via the Chao Phraya river into the Gulf of Thailand in large volume. The main objective is to reduce flooding in the inner part of Bangkok. Based on the King Bhumibol Adulyadej (Rama IX)'s water diversion concept, Khlong Lat Pho accelerates the reduction of water overflow on either side of the Chao Phraya river before the sea rise and hence prevents the sea water from flooding the adjacent areas along the river sides.

In addition to serving as the sluice gate, as recommended by the King Bhumibol Adulyadej, Khlong Lat Pho is used to generate electricity with assistance of hydraulic turbines installed at the watergate. Royal Irrigation Department (RID) has adopted the idea and installed hydraulic turbines at watergates nationwide, hence creating more sources of electricity generation for Thai people.
