= Wat Chong Nonsi =

Buddhist temple in Bangkok, Thailand

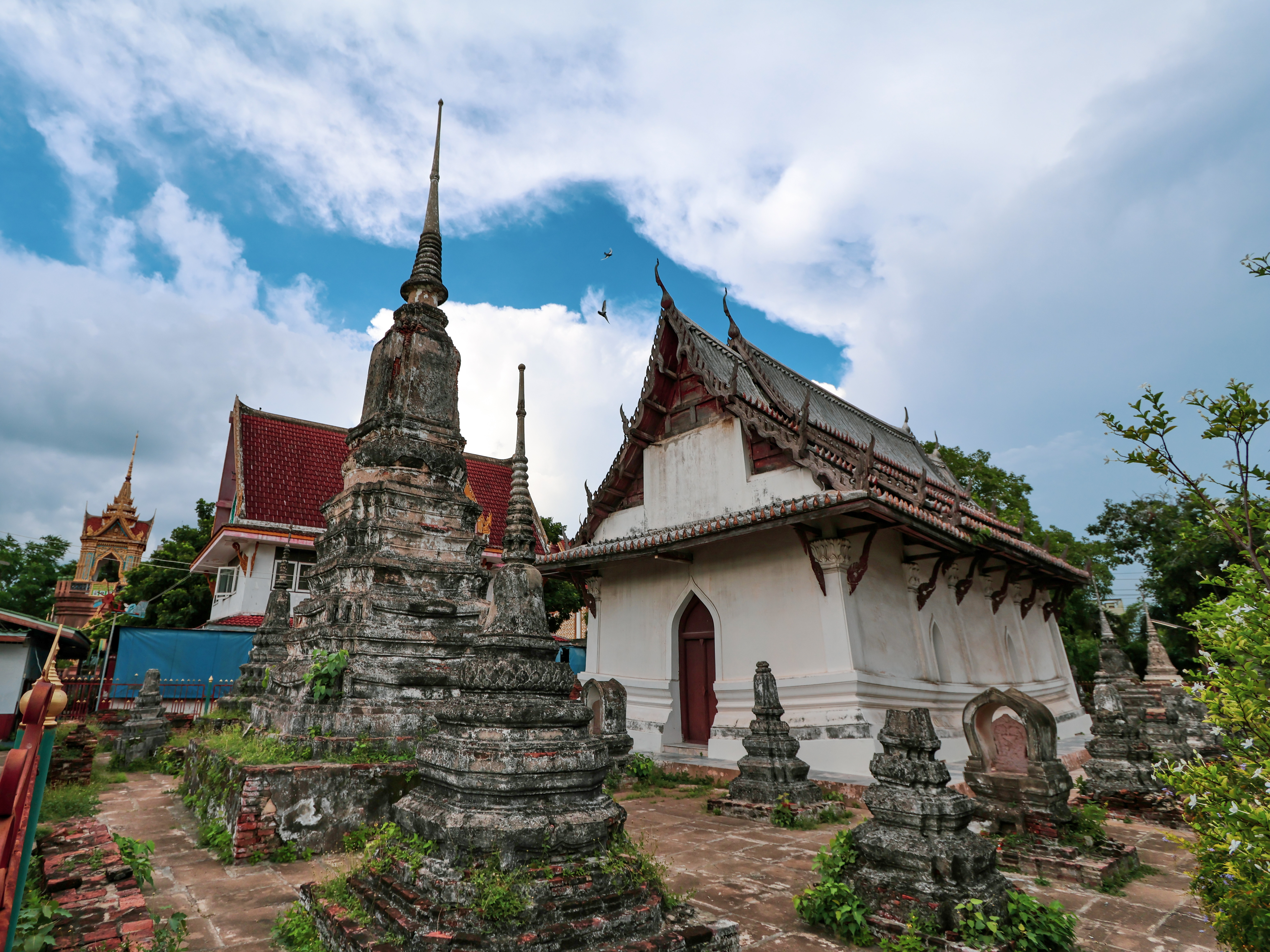
- The ubosot and the cetiyas

- Location within Bangkok

Religion
- Affiliation: Buddhism
- Sect: Theravāda Mahā Nikāya
- Status: Civilian temple

Location
- Location: 463 Nonsi rd, Chong Nonsi, Yan Nawa, Bangkok 10120
- Country: Thailand
- Coordinates: 13.693066°N 100.546156°E

Wat Chong Nonsi (Thai: วัดช่องนนทรี, pronounced [wát t͡ɕʰɔ̂ŋ nōn.sīː]) is a Thai Buddhist temple of the late Ayutthaya period. The temple is adjacent to the edge of Chao Phraya river on the east side of Bangkok in the area known as Chong Nonsi. The front of the temple faces the east likewise because it is the range where the river flows upward, opposite the side of Samut Prakan's Bang Kachao.

== Architecture and artifacts ==
The main construction is the ubosot (ordination hall). It is the junk-like bending hall with five rooms, two porches, which looks like Mhaaud Church. (Note: "มหาอุด" is a specific term referring to an ordination hall that has no doors or any other windows. Apart from the only door that is the entrance and exit.) The front of the ubosot is made as a second projecting portico, with four pillars supporting the roof timbers. The gable is made as a carved-wooden partition without patterns. The roof is wavy, made of tiles, then plastered with cement adjacent to the eaves. The front of the hall has cetiyas (pagodas) and bai sema (stone boundary makers) stones lined up.

The internal part houses the Buddha statue in subduing Mara posture, enshrined as the principal Buddha image, with the other four Buddha images spectacularly arranged in tiers. They are placed in pairs in an indenting way. At the base of the Buddha image, there is also gorgeous stucco with the lion's legs finely designed as the picture of garuda.

== Murals ==
All four interior walls are covered with mural paintings; only two murals remain in a well-preserved state. These paintings depict the Mahanipata Jataka (the last ten lives of the Buddha), the past Buddhas, and the life of Gautama Buddha. The color palette is dominated by faded red and pink tones derived from natural pigments. These murals are considered among the most complete examples of Ayutthaya-period painting, comparable in style to those at Wat Prasat in Nonthaburi Province. They are believed to date back to the reign of King Borommakot (r. 1733–1758).

Vertical floral patterns (lai roi rak) isolate vignettes that within zig-zag lines (sin thao) divide sub-scenes. Gold leaf is applied to prominent figures such as royalty, chariots, and palaces. The artistic style is somewhat surrealist, prioritizing aesthetic beauty over realism, as seen in the depiction of twisted trees and Chinese-style mountains. Notably, some parts of the paintings also exhibit early influences of Western perspective.

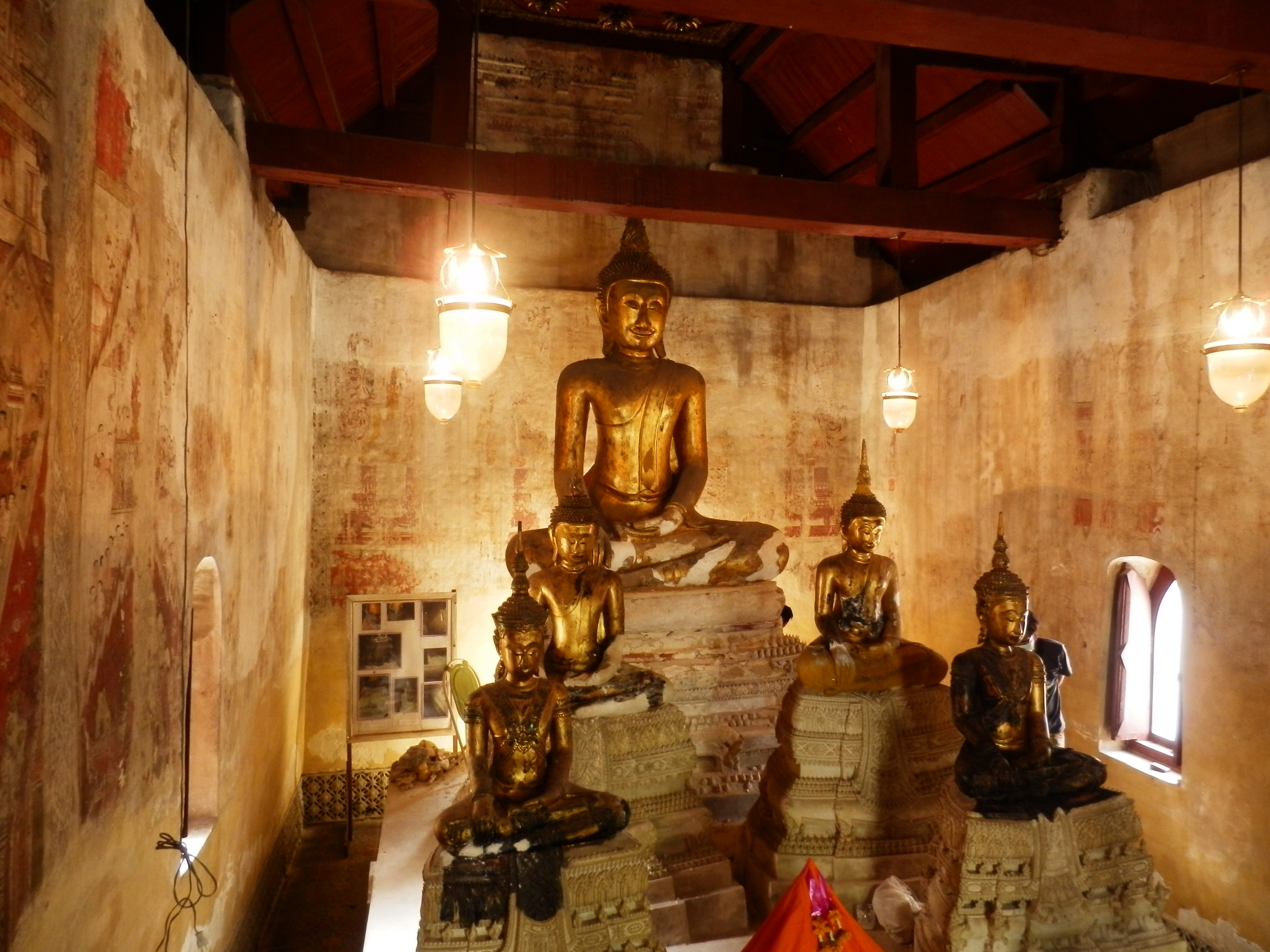
The principal Buddha image and smaller statues inside the hall

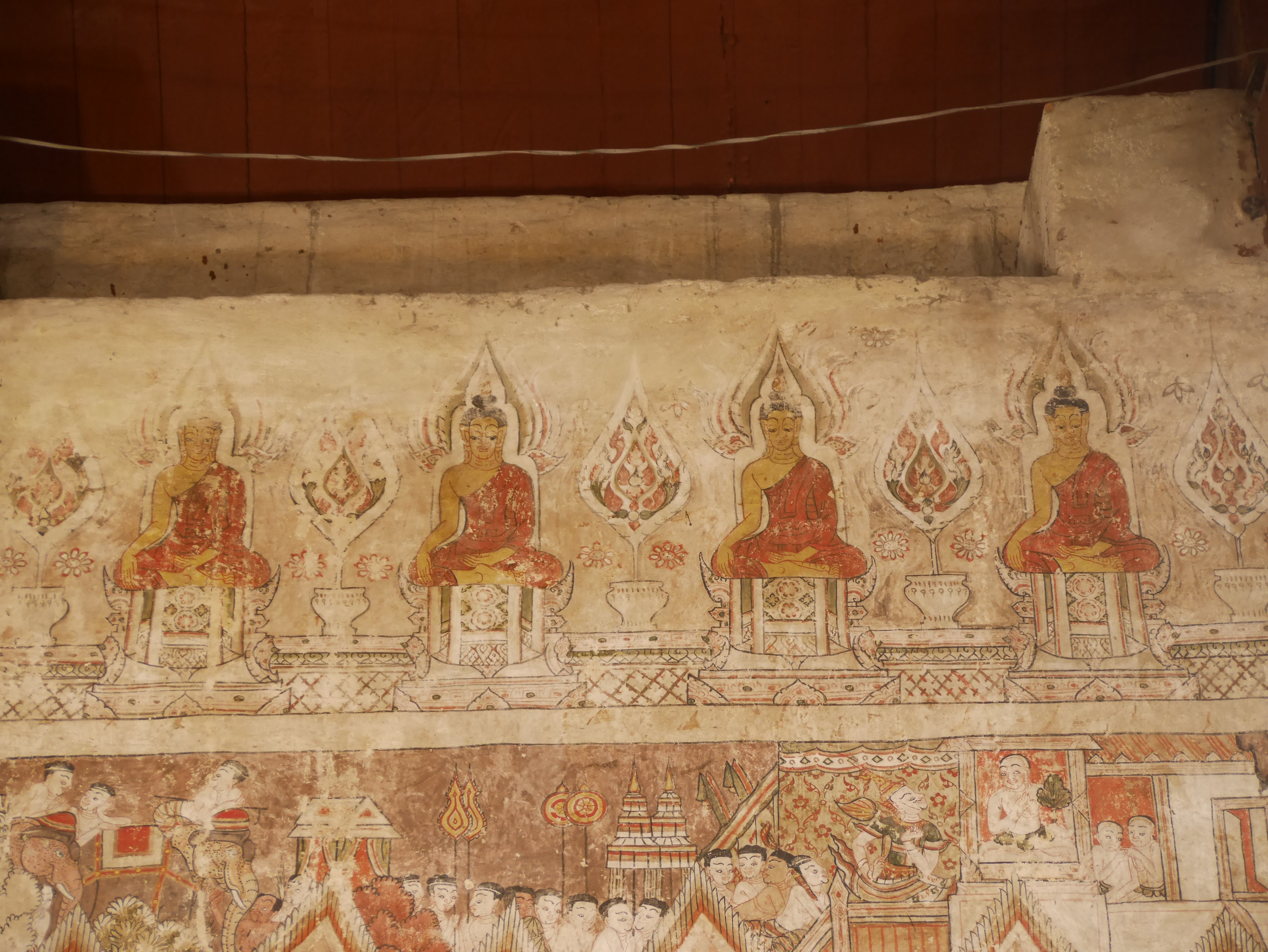
Murals on the interior walls of the old hall

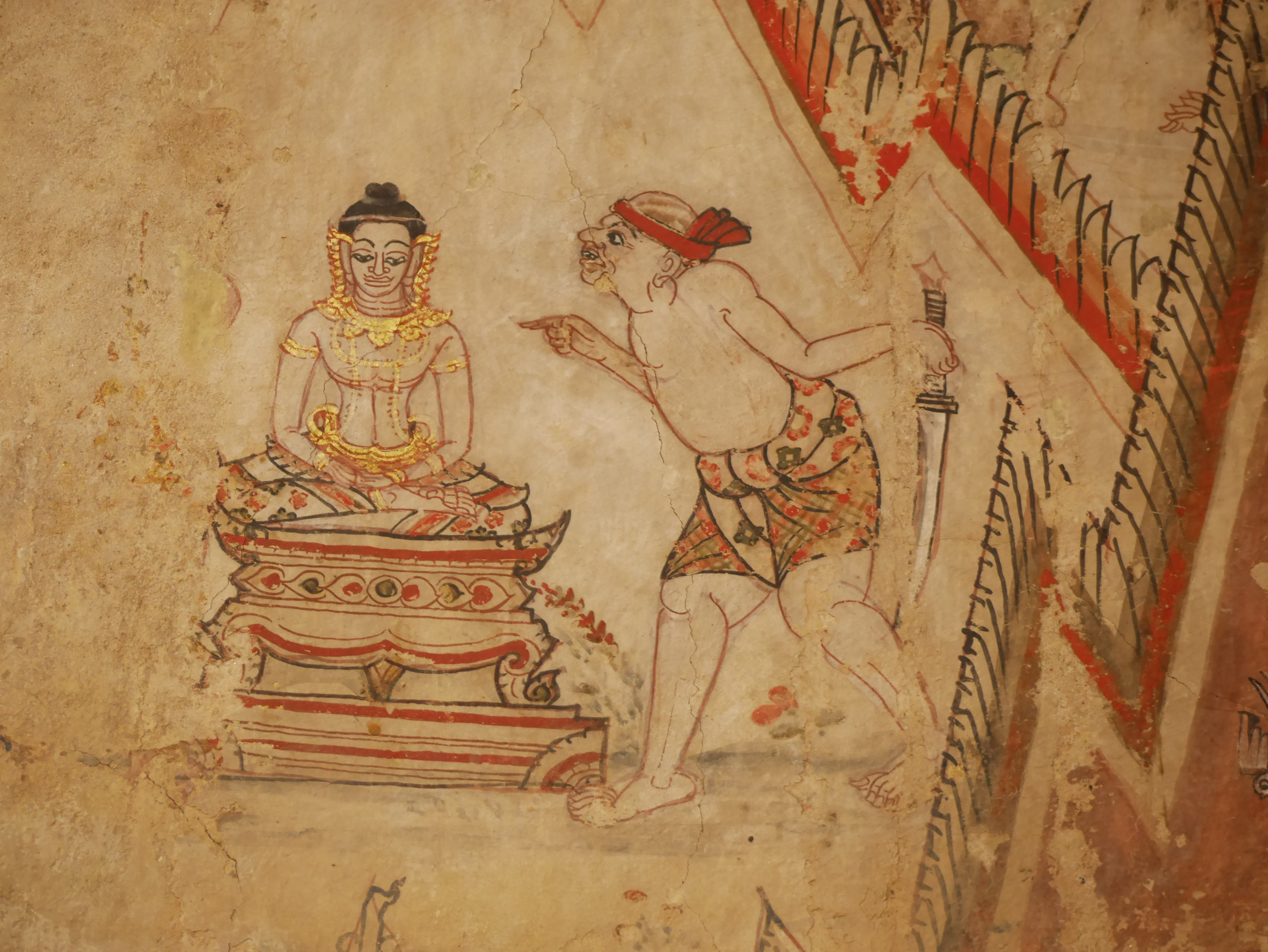
A mural depicting the Temiya Jataka
