= Krungthep Bridge =

Bascule bridge in Bangkok, Thailand

Krungthep Bridge สะพานกรุงเทพ
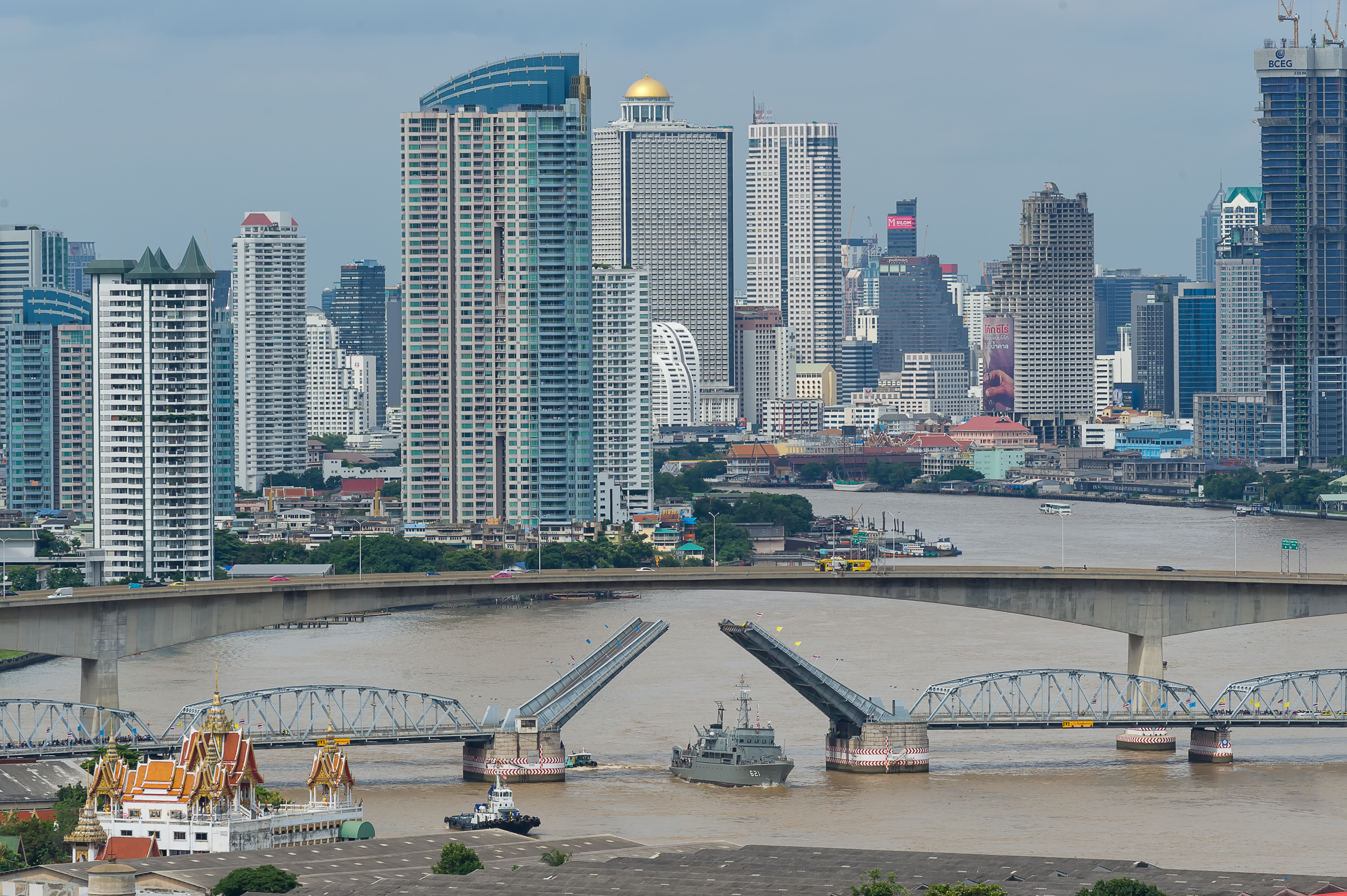
- Krungthep Bridge in 2017, shown here opening for mine countermeasures support ship HTMS Thalang
- Coordinates: 13°42′04″N 100°29′30″E
- Carries: Four lanes of roadway, pedestrians
- Crosses: Chao Phraya River
- Locale: Bangkok, Thailand

Characteristics
- Design: Bascule bridge, Truss bridge
- Total length: 626.25 m
- Longest span: 64 m
- Clearance above: 7.5 m

History
- Construction start: 31 August 1954
- Construction end: 24 March 1959
- Opened: 25 June 1959

Location
- Interactive map of Krungthep Bridge

The Krungthep Bridge (Thai: สะพานกรุงเทพ, RTGS: Saphan Krung Thep, pronounced [sā.pʰāːn krūŋ tʰêːp]) is a bascule bridge (drawbridge) spanning the Chao Phraya river in Bangkok, Thailand. It was the third bridge to be built across the Chao Phraya river. It was constructed by Fuji Car Manufacturing Co., Ltd, with a budget of 31,912,500 baht.

Heavy congestion on the bridge led to the construction of the 6-lane Rama III Bridge nearby.

== Gallery ==
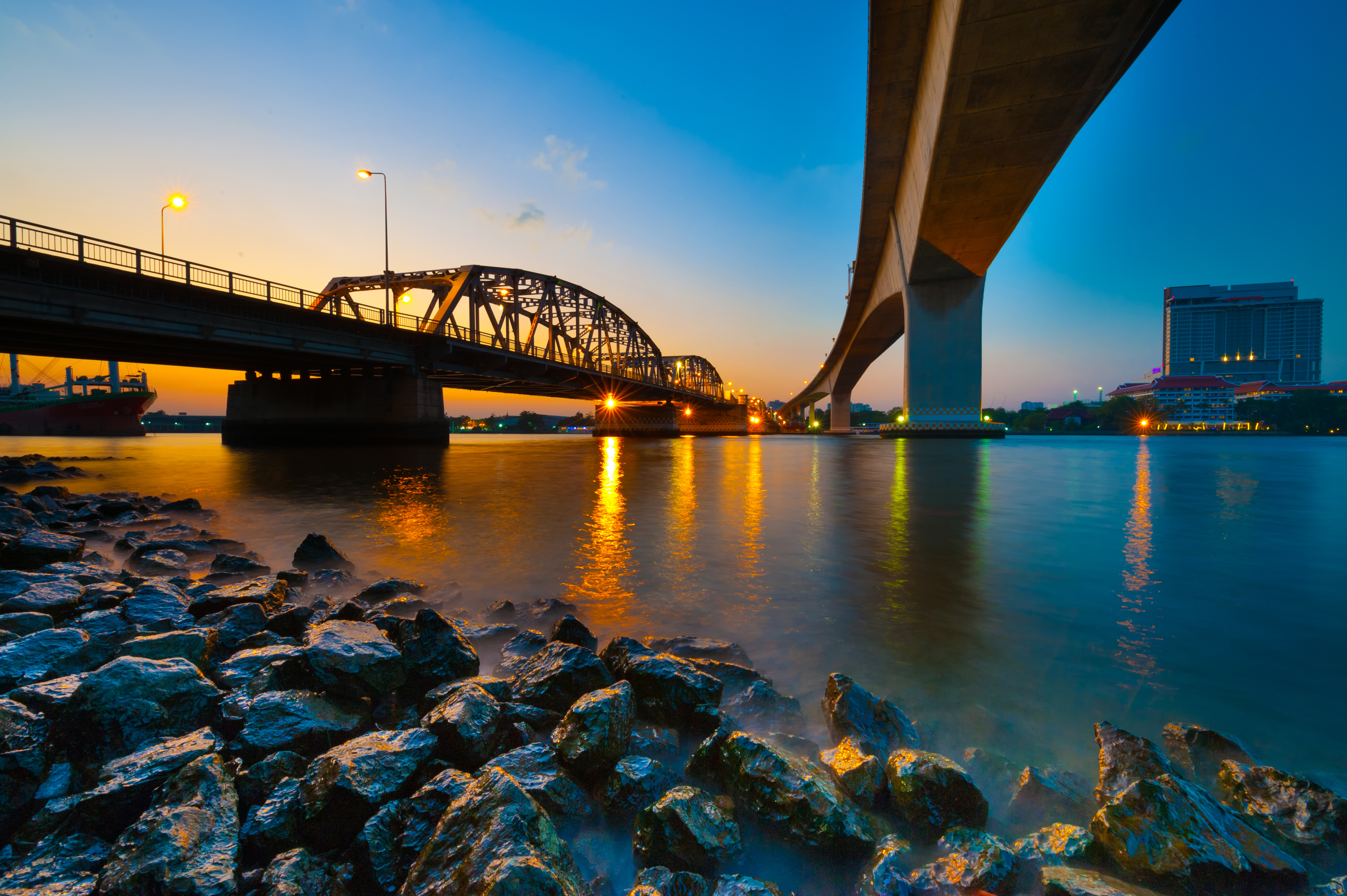

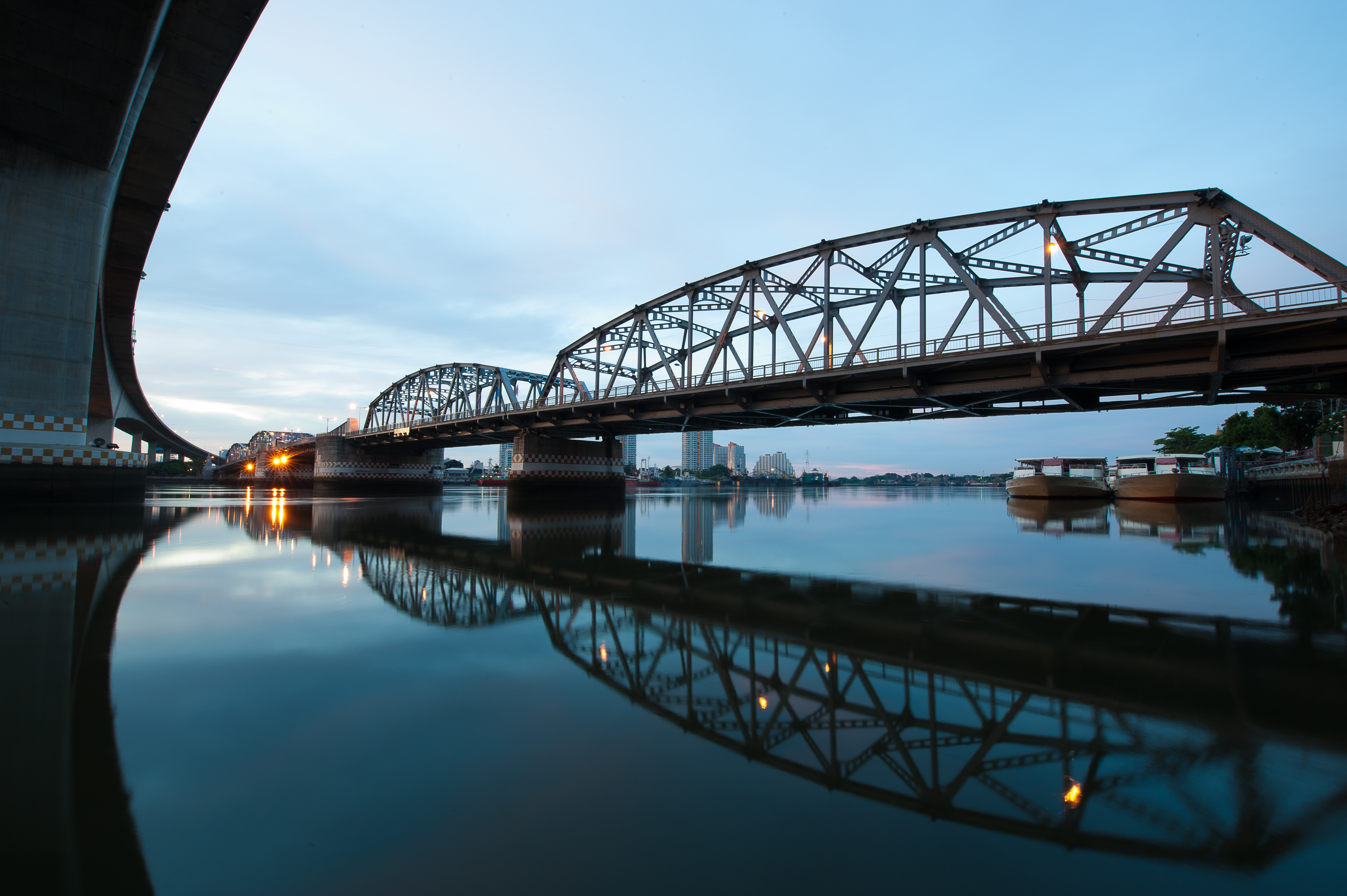

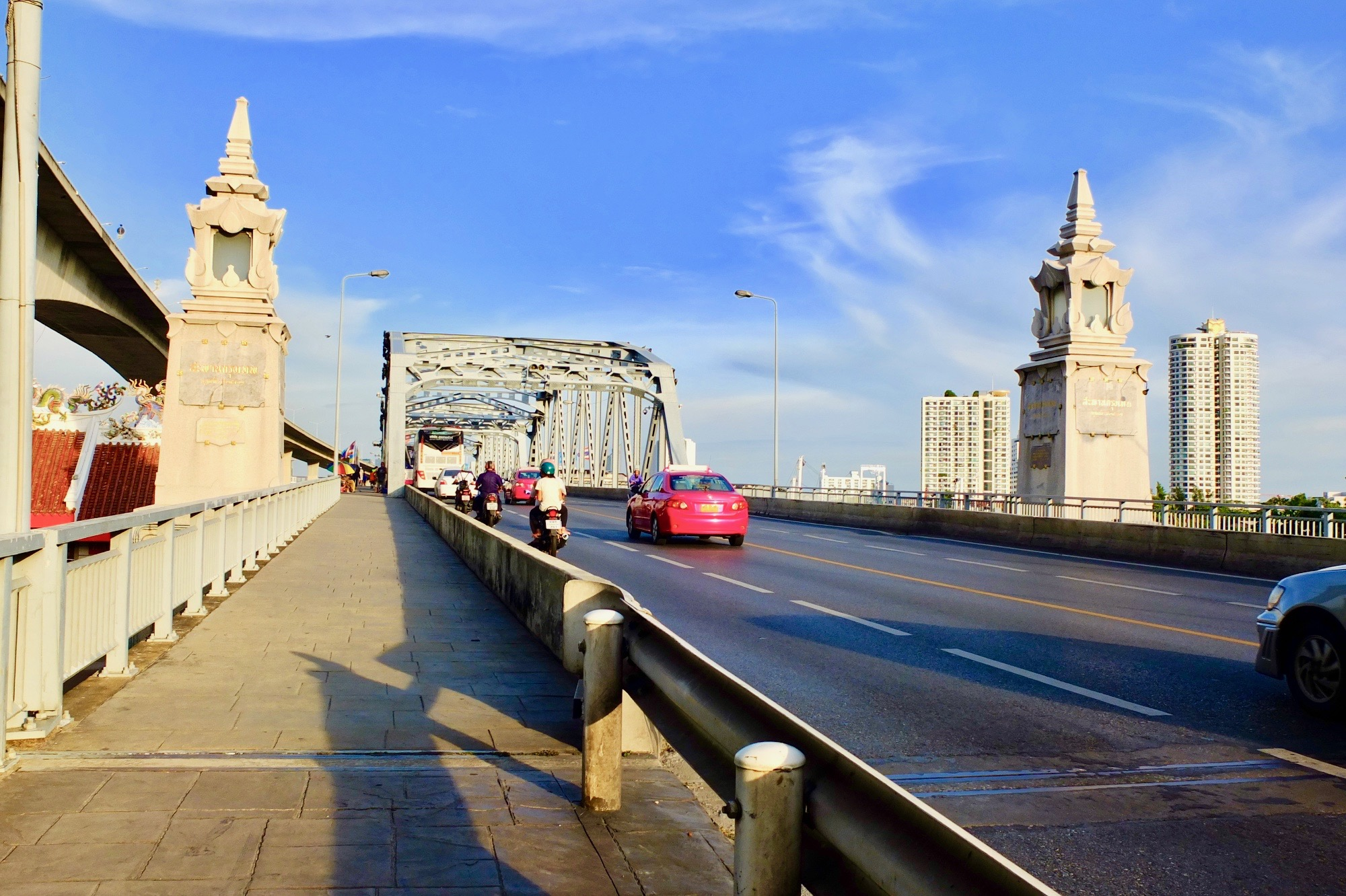

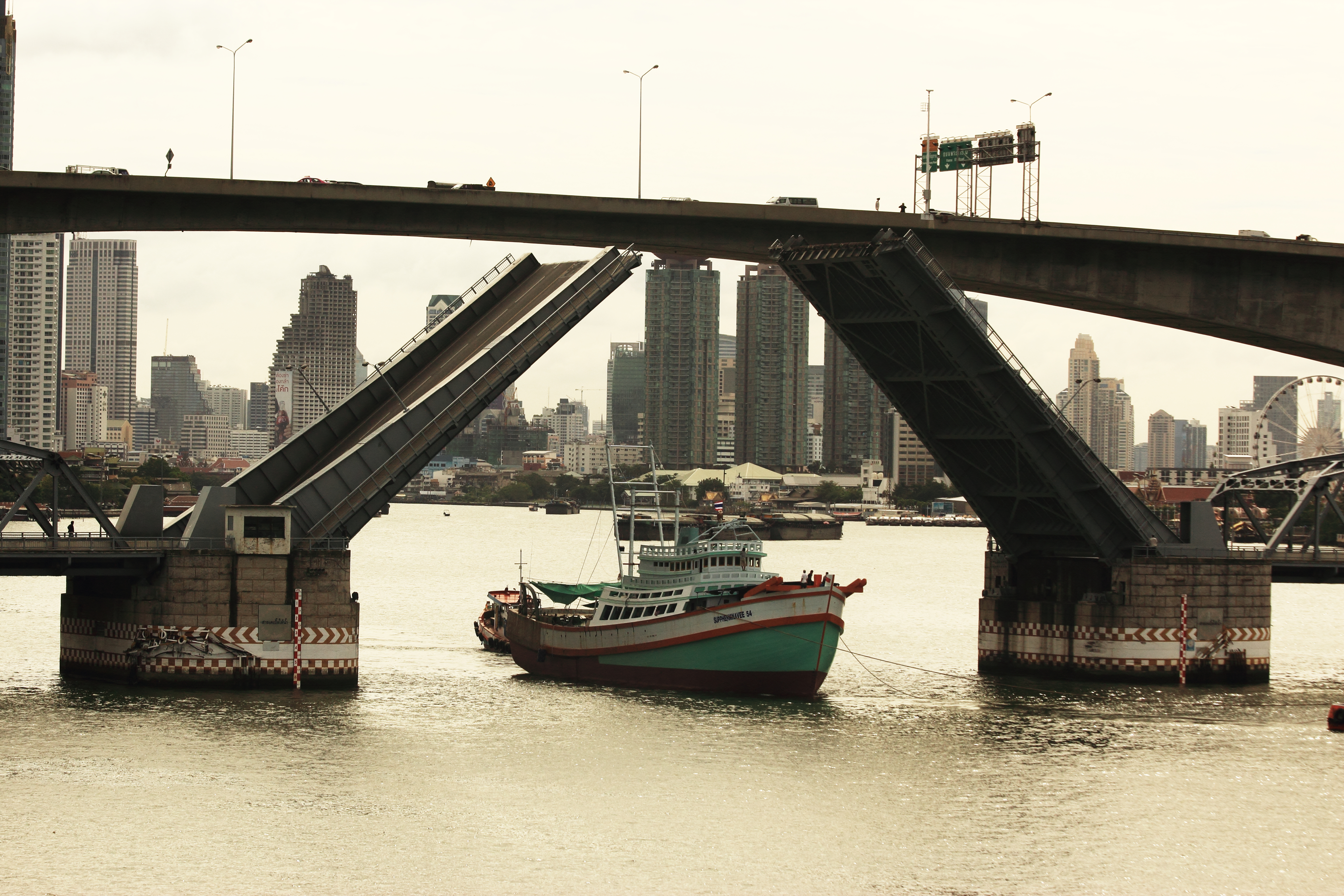
