= Bang Kho Laem district =

Bang Kho Laem บางคอแหลม
- Khet
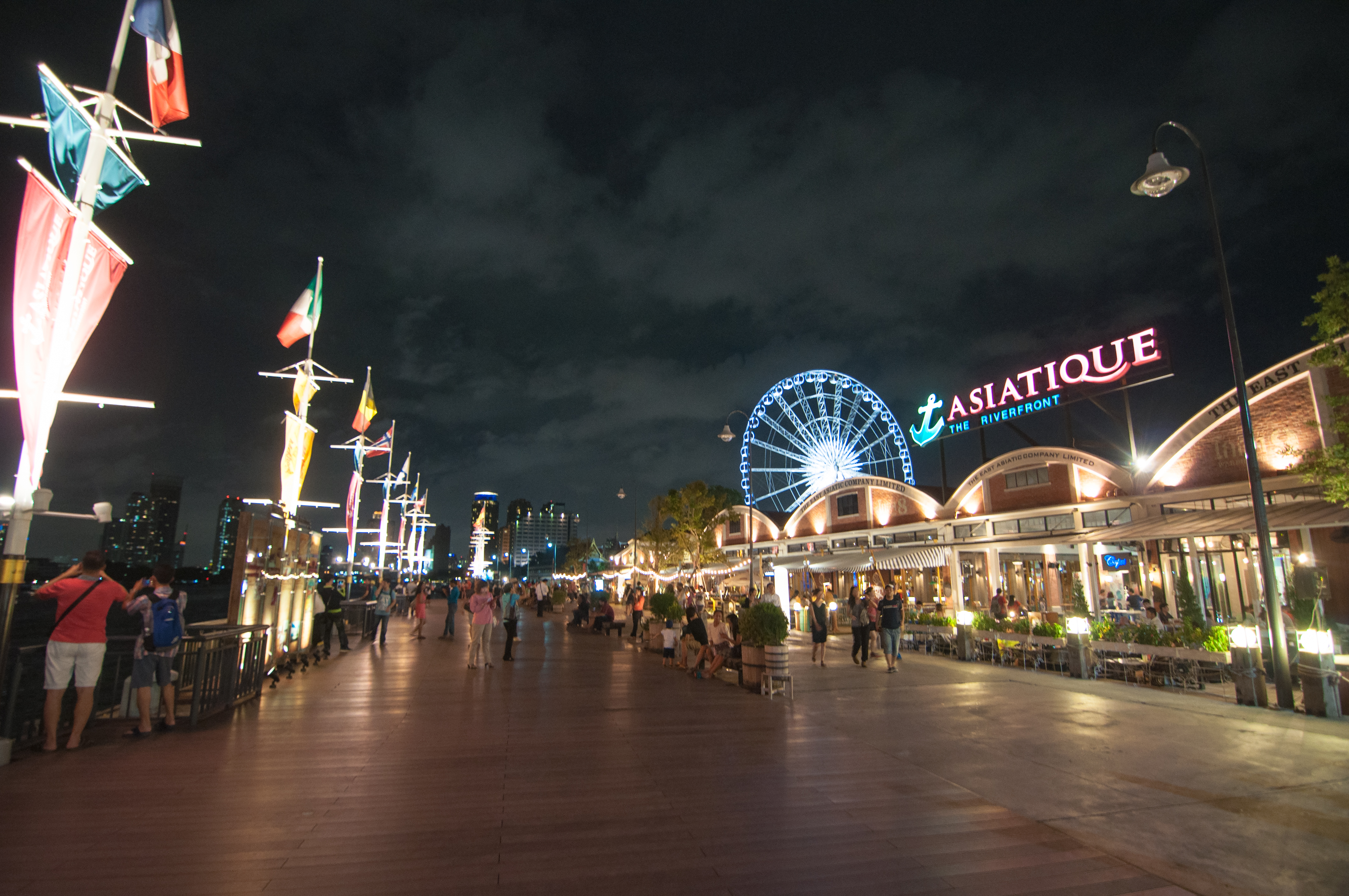
- The waterfront promenade at Asiatique

- Khet location in Bangkok
- Coordinates: 13°41′36″N 100°30′9″E
- Country: Thailand
- Province: Bangkok
- Seat: Bang Kho Laem
- Khwaeng: 3
- Khet established: November 9, 1989

Area
  - Total: 10.921 km^{2} (4.217 sq mi)

Population (2017)
  - Total: 89,358
  - Density: 8,182.21/km^{2} (21,191.8/sq mi)
- Time zone: UTC+7 (ICT)
- Postal code: 10120
- Geocode: 1031

Bang Kho Laem (Thai: บางคอแหลม, pronounced [bāːŋ kʰɔ̄ː lɛ̌ːm]) is one of the 50 districts (khet) of Bangkok, Thailand. The incumbent district officer is Samita Xanthavanij. The district is bounded by (clockwise from north) Sathon, Yannawa, and across the Chao Phraya River, Rat Burana, Thon Buri and Khlong San districts.

== History ==
Bang Kho Laem was formerly a part of amphoe Ban Thawai in Phra Pradaeng Province.

Ban Thawai was later reassigned to Phra Nakhon Province, and renamed amphoe Yan Nawa. When Phra Nakhon and Thon Buri were combined into a single province in 1972, the names of administrative units in the newly combined capital were changed from amphoe and tambon to district (khet) and sub-district (khwaeng). Thus, amphoe Yan Nawa (อำเภอยานนาวา) became khet Yan Nawa (เขตยานนาวา).

Due to population increases, on 18 April 1989, Yan Nawa Branch 2 (Khwaeng Bang Kho Laem) was established as a second administrative unit within the Yan Nawa District, overseeing three sub-districts: Bang Kho Laem, Wat Phraya Krai, and Bang Khlo. It became a separate district on 9 November 1989, called Bang Kho Laem.

The name Bang Kho Laem literally means "a place of narrow neck", referring to the Chao Phraya River that bends sharply here. It has been noted that it may have a Bangkok Malay origin.

Within Soi Charoen Krung 103 is a long-established Muslim community known as Suan Luang 1. In the past, the waterway here was a large khlong (canal) with clean water where children could swim, and ships would pass through. It is now just a small waterway. Since 2013, the area has been developed into a waterfront market featuring about 100 street food stalls, all of which are halal, although some traders are non-Muslims.

== Administration ==
The district is divided into three sub-districts (khwaeng).

No.	Name	Thai	Area (km^{2})	Map
1.	Bang Kho Laem	บางคอแหลม	2.749	Map
2.	Wat Phraya Krai	วัดพระยาไกร	2.300	Map
3.	Bang Khlo	บางโคล่	5.872	Map
Total			10.921	Map

== Places ==
Important streets in the district include:

- Rama III Road
- Charoen Krung Road
- Charoen Rat Road
- Ratchadaphisek Road
- Mahaisawan Road
- Chan Road
- Sathu Pradit Road
- Si Rat Express Way

Secondary streets in the district include:

- Sut Prasoet Road
- Chalaem Nimit Road
- Charoen Krung 85 and Sut Prasoet 9 (Soi Ban Mai)
- Charoen Krung 107, Charoen Rat 7, and Charoen Rat 10 (Soi Pradu 1)
- Charoen Rat 5, Charoen Rat 5 Yaek 4, Charoen Rat 7 Yaek 7, and Charoen Rat 8 (Soi Yu Di)
- Chan 43 (Soi Wat Phai Ngoen)
- Sathu Pradit 12 (Soi Thawi Sit)
- Charoen Rat 7 Yaek 35 (Soi Rat Uthit 1)

Asiatique is a famous open-air night shopping mall in Bangkok.

== Education ==
Shrewsbury International School is in the district.

== Health ==
Charoenkrung Pracharak Hospital, operated by Bangkok Metropolitan Administration is in the district.
