= Rama III Bridge =

Rama III Bridge สะพานพระราม ๓
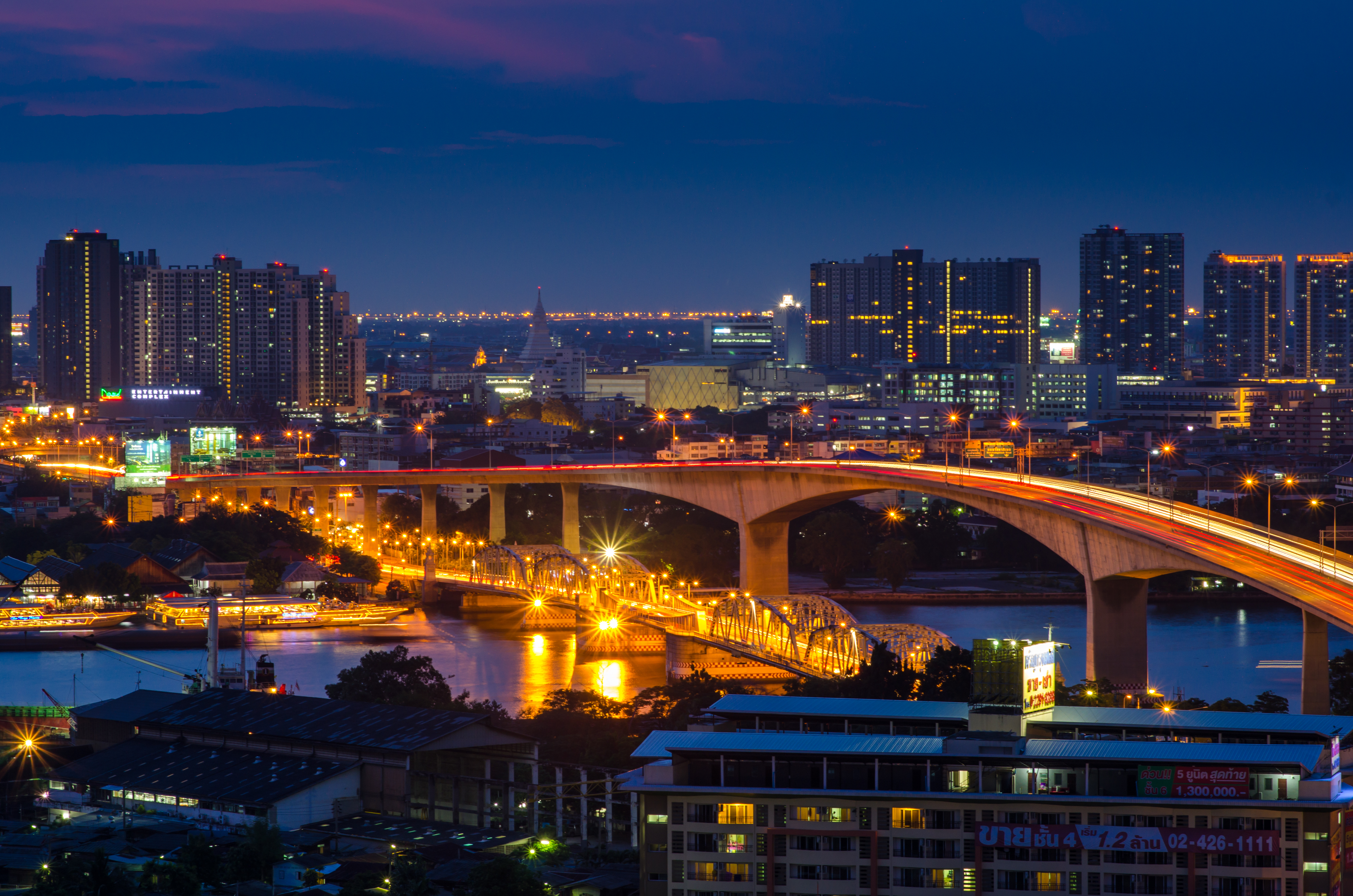
- Rama III Bridge (higher) and Krungthep Bridge (lower)
- Coordinates: 13°42′05″N 100°29′33″E
- Carries: Six lanes of roadway
- Crosses: Chao Phraya River
- Locale: Bangkok, Thailand

Characteristics
- Design: Cantilever bridge
- Total length: 1864m
- Width: 23 m
- Longest span: 226m
- Clearance below: 32 m

History
- Construction start: October 1996
- Construction end: October 1999
- Construction cost: 400 million kr

The Rama III Bridge (Thai: สะพานพระราม 3, RTGS: Saphan Phra Ram Sam, pronounced [sā.pʰāːn pʰráʔ rāːm sǎːm]), also known as the New Krungthep Bridge, is a bridge crossing the Chao Phraya River in Bangkok, Thailand. The bridge was completed in 1999 and was designed to alleviate traffic congestion on the adjacent Krungthep Bridge. The bridge was named in honour of King Nangklao.
