= Chong Nonsi =

Sub-district in Bangkok, Thailand

Coordinates: 13°41′47.5″N 100°32′33.7″E

Chong Nonsi ช่องนนทรี
- Khwaeng
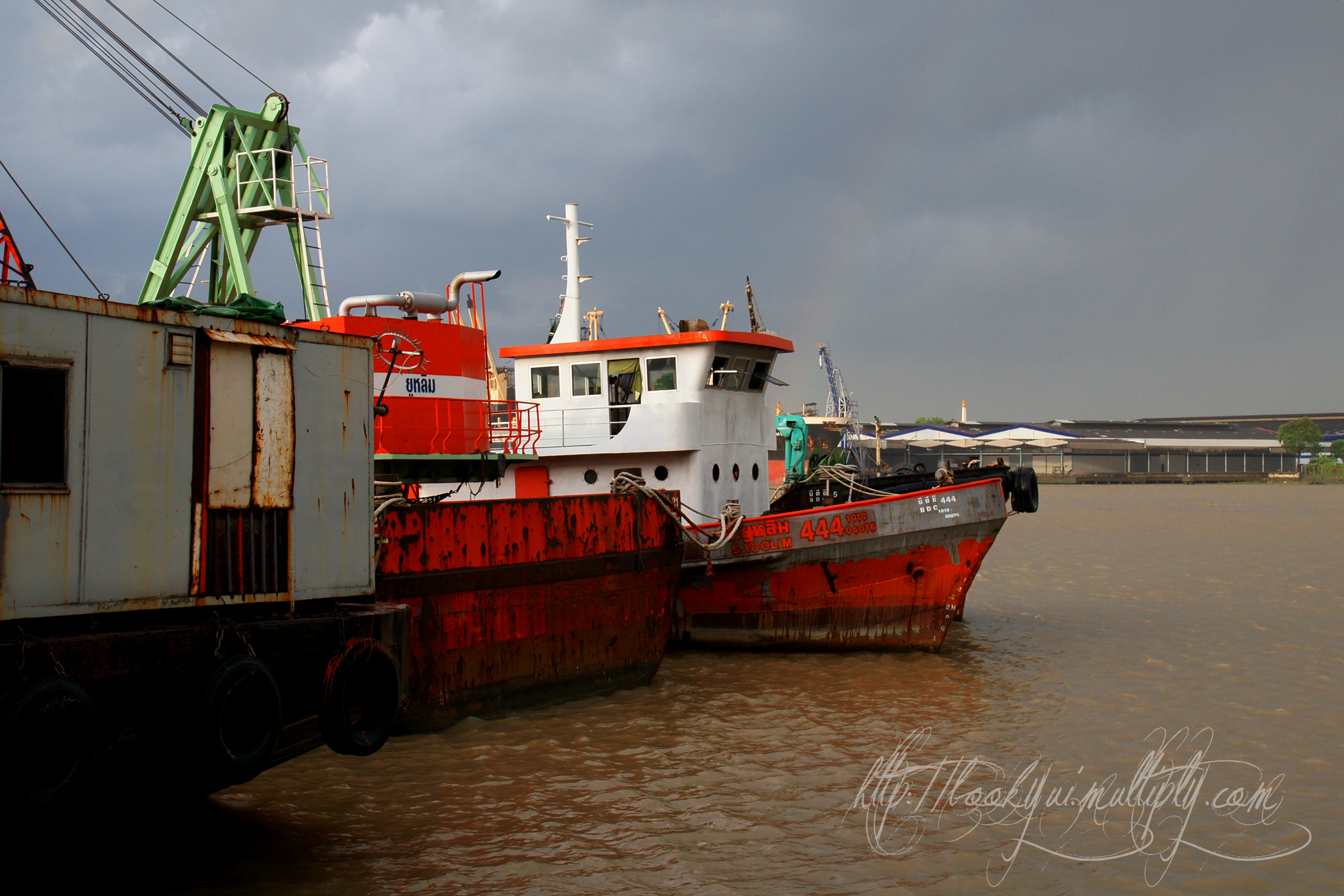
- Ships are moored on the bank of Chao Phraya at Chong Nonsi

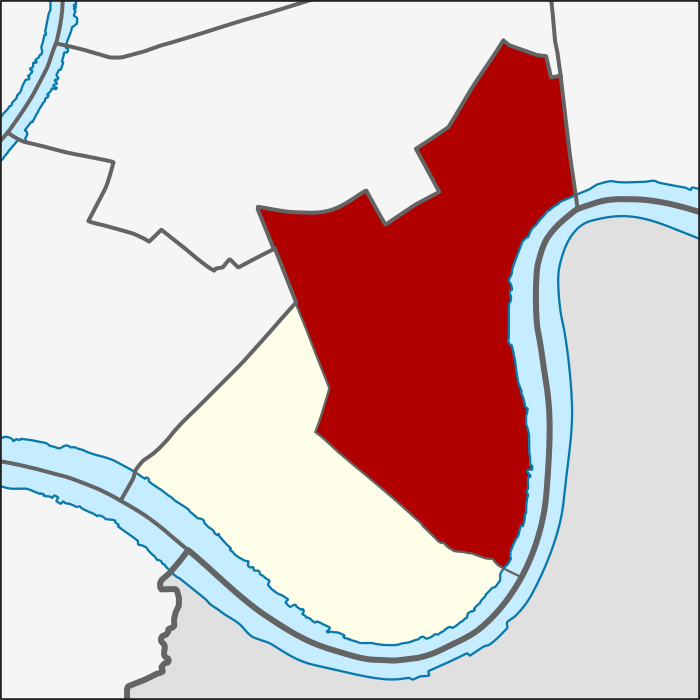
- Location in Yan Nawa District
- Country: Thailand
- Province: Bangkok
- Khet: Yan Nawa

Area
  - Total: 9.984 km^{2} (3.855 sq mi)

Population (2020)
  - Total: 47,872
- Time zone: UTC+7 (ICT)
- Postal code: 10120
- TIS 1099: 101203

Chong Nonsi (Thai: ช่องนนทรี, pronounced [t͡ɕʰɔ̂ŋ nōn.sīː]) is one of the two khwaengs (sub-districts) of Yan Nawa District, Bangkok rim Chao Phraya River. In late 2018, it had a population of 48,277 people, with total area of 9.984 km^{2} (round about 3.854 mi^{2}). It is the location of the Yan Nawa District Office. This Sub-District is also divided into 13 communities.

== History and naming ==
It's named after an ancient temple Wat Chong Nonsi and Khlong Chong Nonsi, a small khlong (canal) that runs through the area and parallel to Naradhiwas Rajanagarindra Road.

The name "Chong Nonsi" is derived from a folktale titled The Legend of Lord Uthong (ตำนานท้าวอู่ทอง). It is said, that Lord Uthong (not to be confused with King Uthong of Ayutthaya) and his wife, along with his soldiers, escaped from Uthong due to cholera. During his journey, he took a rest at a place near a river. He and his wife pretended that they were not royalty, and asked his wife to remove her tiara for their own safety. The place where they took a rest was called "Bang Ratklao" (บางรัดเกล้า, "a place where a tiara was taken off") and was later renamed "Bang Kachao", as it is known today. Lord Uthong commanded his soldiers to tie a rope, and made a raft to cross the Chao Phraya River. While he was making his way across the river, cholera was rapidly chasing him by climbing the rope. He decided to cut the rope to get rid of cholera. The Lord and his wife settled down in a village, and stayed there for so long, the area was named "Chong Nang Ni" (ช่องนางหนี, "a channel that lady escaped"). It was later renamed "Chong Nonsi".

Another Thai folktale tells of how the temple Wat Chong Nonsi was named. According to the folktale, a woman who escaped from the Burmese army invading Ayutthaya secretly hid herself in a Buddhist temple and survived. As a result, people called this temple "Wat Nang Ni" (a temple where a lady hid herself). It was later renamed "Wat Chong Nonsi".

== Places of interest ==
- CentralPlaza Rama III
- The UP Rama3
- Wat Chong Nonsi
- Wat Chong Lom
- Wat Pho Man Khunaram
- Goods and Imitation Goods Museum
- Tentacles
- Mae Nam Railway Station
