= Yan Nawa district =

Yan Nawa ยานนาวา
- Khet
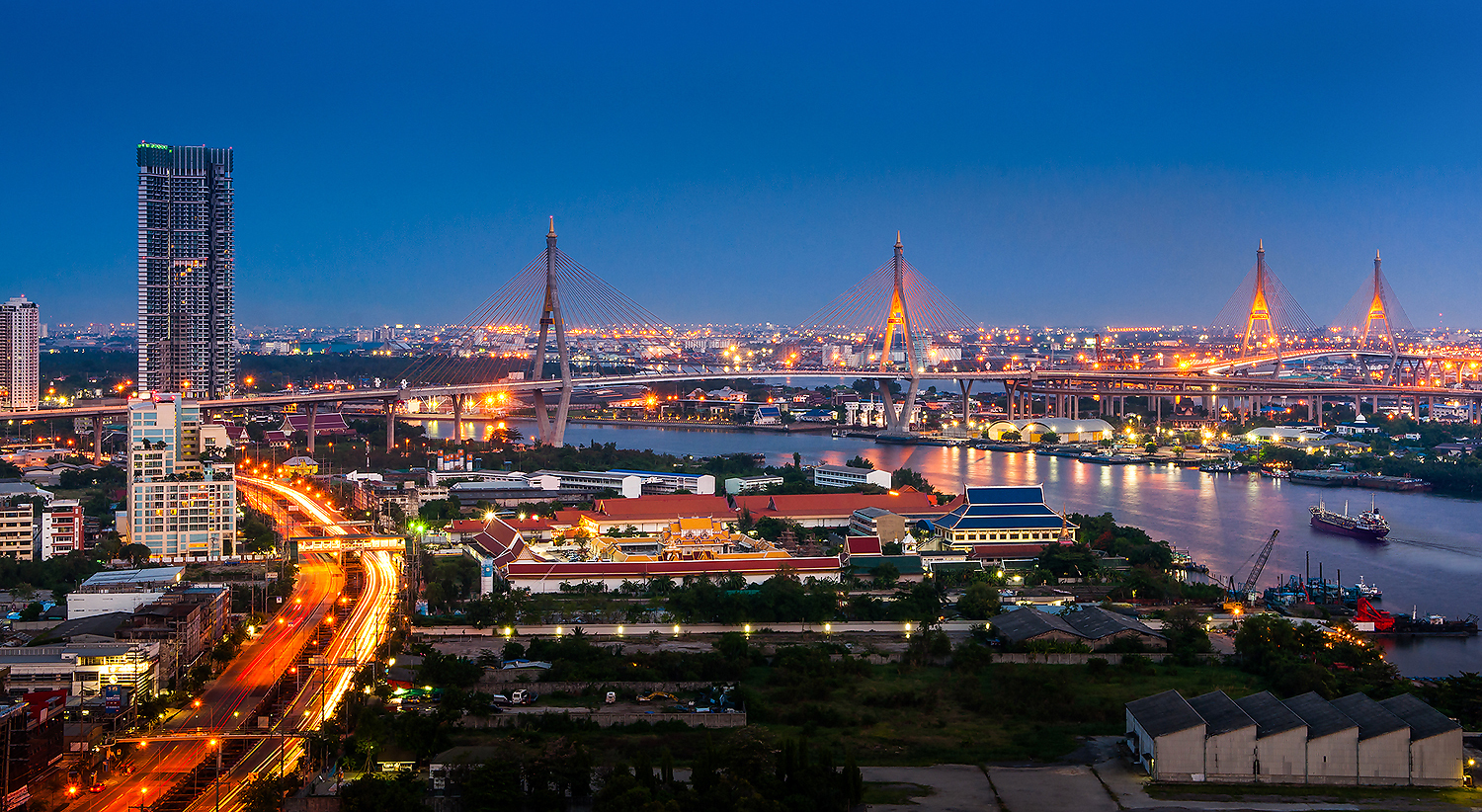
- Rama IX Bridge

- Khet location in Bangkok
- Coordinates: 13°41′49″N 100°32′35″E
- Country: Thailand
- Province: Bangkok
- Seat: Chong Nonsi
- Khwaeng: 2

Area
  - Total: 16.662 km^{2} (6.433 sq mi)

Population (2017)
  - Total: 78,797
  - Density: 4,729.14/km^{2} (12,248.4/sq mi)
- Time zone: UTC+7 (ICT)
- Postal code: 10120
- Geocode: 1012

Yan Nawa or Yannawa (Thai: ยานนาวา, pronounced [jāːn nāːwāː]) is one of the 50 districts (khet) of Bangkok, Thailand. The district is bounded by (clockwise from west to northeast) Rat Burana (across Chao Phraya River), Bang Kho Laem, Sathon, and Khlong Toei Districts of Bangkok. Its neighbor from east to south is Phra Pradaeng district of Samut Prakan province.

== History ==
Yan Nawa, in the past, was called Ban Thawai (Tavoy village, บ้านทะวาย) or Ban Khok Khwai (water buffalo pen village, บ้านคอกควาย) due to a large concentration of Tavoy people who often brought water buffaloes to market for trade. It became Ban Thawai District during King Chulalongkorn's rule, and was part of Phra Pradaeng province. When that province was abolished in 1932, its northern parts were added to Phra Nakhon (Bangkok) Province. Ban Tavoy was then renamed Yan Nawa District in agreement with the earlier rename of Wat Ban Thawai to Wat Yan Nawa. It became a khet in 1972 and the present-day khwaeng in 1975. On 9 November 1989 parts of Yan Nawa were split off to form two new districts, Sathon and Bang Kho Laem. Wat Yan Nawa, the temple the district name inherits, is now in Sathon district.

In the past, the waters of the Chao Phraya River at Yan Nawa were influenced by rising sea level. Therefore making it a brackish water area similar to a mangrove forest. Therefore, there were many aquatic animal resources as food for the locals.

Various species of crabs could be found there, including fiddler crabs and mud carbs that were usually found in edges of ditches. Most shrimp and prawn in orchard ditches included Lanchester's freshwater prawn and snapping shrimp. Yan Nawa people would turn these into dried or sweet shrimp. The larger species, such as giant river prawn usually hid in nipa palm roots, could be cooked as a meat dish and even as a dessert.

Lamp shell, shellfish and clams could also be found living in ditches as well.

Fish species included clown featherback, climbing perch, mullet, Java barb, black sharkminnow, mudskippers, minnows, common gourami, snakeskin gourami, walking catfish, common snakehead, sea catfish, sand goby and various species of gudgeons.

Locals would often make fishcake and green curry. Bagrid catfish was used for bamboo sprout soup. Walking catfish was the main ingredient for dried curry. For fun and entertainment, the locals would put wrestling halfbeak in the earthen jars or pots to fight like fighting fish.

The excess fish and shellfish were sold in traditional markets.

== Administration ==
The district is divided into two sub-districts (khwaeng).

No.	Name	Thai	Area (km^{2})	Map
3.	Chong Nonsi	ช่องนนทรี	9.984	Map
4.	Bang Phongphang	บางโพงพาง	6.678	Map
Total			16.662	Map

The missing numbers 1 and 2 belong to the sub-districts which were split off to form Sathon district.

== Places ==
- Rama IX Bridge, the first cable-stayed bridge in Thailand.
- Bhumibol Bridge
- Wat Chong Nonsi
- Wat Pho Maen Khunaram

== Shopping ==
- Central Plaza Rama III
- Chatuchak Rama III
- Lotus Rama III

== Diplomatic mission ==
- Embassy of Libya

== Education ==
- Nonsi Witthaya School
