= List of bridges in Thailand =

This is a list of bridges in the country of Thailand.

== Historical and architectural interest bridges ==
	Name	Thai	Distinction	Length	Type	Carries Crosses	Opened	Location	Province	Ref.
1	Memorial Bridge (Bangkok)	สะพานปฐมบรมราชานุสรณ์		678 m (2,224 ft)	Truss; Steel; Bascule bridge	Road bridge Chao Phraya River	1932	Bangkok; 13°44′21.5″N 100°29′51.3″E	Bangkok	
2	River Kwai Bridge	สะพานข้ามแม่น้ำแคว	Well-known thanks to the novel and the film The Bridge on the River Kwai		Truss; Steel	Burma Railway; Khwae Yai River	1943	Kanchanaburi; 14°02′27.1″N 99°30′13.3″E	Kanchanaburi	
3	Wang Pho Viaduct	สะพานรถไฟ ถ้ำกระแซ			Trestle; Wood	Burma Railway; Khwae Noi River side	1943	Sai Yok District; 14°06′16.3″N 99°10′01.7″E	Kanchanaburi	
4	Uttamanusorn Bridge	สะพานอุตตมานุสรณ์	Longest Thailand wooden bridge	850 m (2,790 ft)	Trestle; Wood	Footbridge; Songkalia River	1987	Sangkhla Buri District; 15°08′36.9″N 98°26′59.6″E	Kanchanaburi	
5	Mae Kuang Dam Suspension Bridge	สะพานแขวน เขื่อนแม่กวงอุดมธารา		166 m (545 ft)	Suspension; Steel truss deck, concrete pylons Twin bridges	Mae Kuang	2017	Luang Nuea; 18°57′06.8″N 99°08′10.2″E	Chiang Mai	

== Major bridges ==
This table presents a non-exhaustive list of the road and railway bridges with spans greater than 100 metres (328 ft) or total lengths longer than 5,000 metres (16,404 ft).

	Name	Thai	Span	Length	Type	Carries Crosses	Opened	Location	Province	Ref.
1	Kanchanaphisek Bridge	สะพานกาญจนาภิเษก	500 m (1,600 ft)	941 m (3,087 ft)	Cable-stayed; Composite steel/concrete deck, concrete pylons 2x72+76+500+76 +2x72	Motorway Route 9 Outer Ring Road; Chao Phraya River	2007	Phra Pradaeng; 13°37′59.7″N 100°32′18.5″E	Samut Prakan	(Note: The length given only takes into account the main bridge, central span(s) and shore span(s), approach viaducts are not counted.)
2	Rama IX Bridge	สะพานพระราม 9	450 m (1,480 ft)	781 m (2,562 ft)	Cable-stayed; Steel box girder deck, steel pylons 47+57+61+450+61 +57+47	Chaloem Maha Nakhon Expressway; Chao Phraya River	1987	Bangkok; 13°40′55.7″N 100°31′03.9″E	Bangkok	
3	Thotsamarachan Bridge	สะพานทศมราชัน	450 m (1,480 ft)	781 m (2,562 ft)	Cable-stayed; Composite steel/concrete deck, concrete pylons 47+58+61+450+61 +58+47	Rama III-Dao Khanong-Western Outer Ring Road Expressway; Chao Phraya River	2024	Bangkok; 13°40′54.9″N 100°31′05.3″E	Bangkok	
4	Bhumibol Bridge II	สะพานภูมิพล	398 m (1,306 ft)	4,200 m (13,800 ft)	Cable-stayed; Composite steel/concrete deck, concrete pylons 68+83+398+83+68	Bangkok Industrial Ring Road; Chao Phraya River	2006	Phra Pradaeng; 13°39′37.7″N 100°32′22.3″E	Samut Prakan	
5	Bhumibol Bridge I	สะพานภูมิพล	326 m (1,070 ft)	4,200 m (13,800 ft)	Cable-stayed; Composite steel/concrete deck, concrete pylons 50+74+326+74+50	Bangkok Industrial Ring Road; Chao Phraya River	2006	Bangkok–Phra Pradaeng; 13°39′37.7″N 100°32′22.3″E	Bangkok; Samut Prakan	
6	Rama VIII Bridge	สะพานพระราม 8	300 m (980 ft)	2,450 m (8,040 ft)	Cable-stayed; Composite steel/concrete deck, concrete pylon 75+50+50+300	Road bridge Chao Phraya River	2002	Bangkok; 13°46′08.1″N 100°29′49.6″E	Bangkok	
7	New Phra Nang Klao Bridge	สะพานพระนั่งเกล้า 2	229 m (751 ft)		Box girder Prestressed concrete 130+229+130	Highway 302; Chao Phraya River	2008	Mueang Nonthaburi District; 13°52′14.5″N 100°28′35.5″E	Nonthaburi	
8	Rama III Bridge	สะพานพระราม 3	226 m (741 ft)	2,170 m (7,120 ft)	Box girder Prestressed concrete 125+226+125	Rama III Road; Chao Phraya River	1999	Bangkok; 13°42′04.5″N 100°29′32.8″E	Bangkok	
9	Maha Chesadabodindranusorn Bridge	สะพานมหาเจษฎาบดินท รานุสรณ์	200 m (660 ft)	460 m (1,510 ft)	Extradosed; Concrete box girder deck, concrete pylons 130+200+130	Chon Buri 5038 Rural Road; Chao Phraya River	2014	Mueang Nonthaburi District; 13°51′11.3″N 100°28′48.2″E	Nonthaburi	
10	Third Thai–Lao Friendship Bridge	สะพานมิตรภาพ ไทย-ลาว แห่งที่ 3	180 m (590 ft) (x3)	1,423 m (4,669 ft)	Box girder Prestressed concrete 120+3x180+120	Route 295; Asian Highway 15; Mekong	2011	Nakhon Phanom–Thakhek; 17°29′07.9″N 104°43′52.6″E	Nakhon Phanom; Laos	
11	Pathum Thani II Bridge	สะพานปทุมธานี 2	160 m (520 ft)		Box girder Prestressed concrete 129+160+129	Route 345; Chao Phraya River	2009	Mueang Pathum Thani District; 13°57′56.8″N 100°32′03.2″E	Pathum Thani	
12	Chulalongkorn 2 Bridge	สะพานจุฬาลงกรณ์ 2	160 m (520 ft)	340 m (1,120 ft)	Extradosed; Concrete box girder deck, concrete pylons	Nakhon Pathom–Hua Hin Railway; Mae Klong River	2022	Ratchaburi; 13°32′28.3″N 99°49′27.7″E	Ratchaburi	
13	Fifth Thai–Lao Friendship Bridge	สะพานมิตรภาพไทย–ลาว 5	150 m (490 ft) (x3)	1,350 m (4,430 ft)	Extradosed; Concrete box girder deck, 4 concrete pylons	Route 244; Mekong	2025	Bueng Kan–Pakxan; 18°24′23.9″N 103°34′07.0″E	Bueng Kan; Laos	
14	MRT Blue Line Chao Phraya Bridge	สะพานรถไฟฟ้ามหานคร สายสีน้ำเงิน	140 m (460 ft)	300 m (980 ft)	Box girder Prestressed concrete 80+140+80	MRT MRT Blue Line; Chao Phraya River	2019	Bangkok; 13°48′21.1″N 100°31′03.6″E	Bangkok	
15	Rama IV Bridge	สะพานพระราม 4	134 m (440 ft)	278 m (912 ft)	Box girder Prestressed concrete Twin bridges 72+134+72	Chaiya Phruk Road; Chao Phraya River	2006	Pak Kret District; 13°54′56.8″N 100°29′38.4″E	Nonthaburi	
16	Rama V Bridge	สะพานพระราม 5	130 m (430 ft)	320 m (1,050 ft)	Box girder Prestressed concrete 95+130+95	Nakhon Pathom 1020 Rural Road; Chao Phraya River	2002	Mueang Nonthaburi District; 13°49′56.9″N 100°29′43.1″E	Nonthaburi	
17	Rama VI Bridge	สะพานพระราม 6	120 m (390 ft)	441 m (1,447 ft)	Truss; Steel; 78+84+120+84+78	Railway bridge Chao Phraya River	1927	Bangkok–Bang Kruai District; 13°48′47.5″N 100°30′55.0″E	Bangkok; Nonthaburi	
18	Rama VII Bridge	สะพานพระราม 7	120 m (390 ft)	833 m (2,733 ft)	Box girder Prestressed concrete Twin bridges 85+120+85	Wong Sawang Road; Chao Phraya River	1992	Bangkok–Bang Kruai District; 13°48′50.7″N 100°30′50.4″E	Bangkok; Nonthaburi	
19	Light Red Line Commuter Chao Phraya Railway Bridge	สะพานรถไฟฟ้าชานเมือง สายสีแดงอ่อน	120 m (390 ft)		Box girder Prestressed concrete	SRT SRT Light Red Line; Chao Phraya River	2012	Bangkok–Bang Kruai District; 13°48′48.3″N 100°30′54.3″E	Bangkok; Nonthaburi	
20	Prachim Ratthaya Expressway Chao Phraya Bridge	สะพาทางพิเศษประจิมรัถยา	120 m (390 ft)	286 m (938 ft)	Box girder Prestressed concrete Twin bridges 83+120+83	Prachim Ratthaya Expressway; Chao Phraya River	2016	Bangkok; 13°48′46.9″N 100°30′55.8″E	Bangkok	
21	Second Thai–Myanmar Friendship Bridge	สะพานมิตรภาพไทย-พม่า แห่งที่ 2	120 m (390 ft)	760 m (2,490 ft)	Box girder Prestressed concrete 75+120+75	Highway 130; Asian Highway 1 Moei River	2019	Mae Sot–Myawaddy; 16°42′52.3″N 98°29′15.2″E	Tak; Myanmar	
22	Phra Pin-klao Bridge	สะพานพระปิ่นเกล้า	114 m (374 ft)	638 m (2,093 ft)	Box girder Prestressed concrete Twin bridges 83+114+83	Somdet Phra Pin Klao Road; Chao Phraya River	1973	Bangkok; 13°45′43.0″N 100°29′27.2″E	Bangkok	
23	Second Thai–Lao Friendship Bridge	สะพานมิตรภาพ ไทย-ลาว แห่งที่ 2	110 m (360 ft) (x4)	2,050 m (6,730 ft)	Box girder Concrete box girder deck, concrete pylons 2x110+5x80+2x110	Route 239; Mekong	2006	Mukdahan–Savannakhet; 16°36′01.1″N 104°44′33.0″E	Mukdahan; Laos	
24	Fourth Thai–Lao Friendship Bridge	สะพานมิตรภาพ ไทย-ลาว แห่งที่ 4	110 m (360 ft) (x3)	630 m (2,070 ft)	Box girder Prestressed concrete 75+110x3+75	Highway 1356; Asian Highway 3 Mekong	2013	Chiang Khong District–Houayxay; 20°12′50.1″N 100°27′14.1″E	Chiang Rai; Laos	
25	First Thai–Lao Friendship Bridge	สะพานมิตรภาพ 1	105 m (344 ft) (x5)	1,174 m (3,852 ft)	Box girder Prestressed concrete 70+105x5+70	Mittraphap Road; Asian Highway 12; Mekong	1994	Nong Khai–Vientiane; 17°52′48.8″N 102°42′54.2″E	Nong Khai; Laos	
26	Phra Pok Klao Bridge	สะพานพระปกเกล้า	100 m (330 ft)	745 m (2,444 ft)	Box girder Prestressed concrete Triple bridges 56+100+56	Phra Pokklao Road; Chao Phraya River	1984	Bangkok; 13°44′20.5″N 100°29′54.8″E	Bangkok	
27	Sarasin 2 Bridge	สะพานสารสิน 2	100 m (330 ft)	655 m (2,149 ft)	Box girder Prestressed concrete	Highway 402; Phang Nga Bay; Andaman Sea	2011	Phuket (city)–Takua Thung district 8°12′05.1″N 98°17′53.3″E	Phuket; Phang Nga	
28	Bang Na Expressway	ทางพิเศษบูรพาวิถี	42 m (138 ft)	55,000 m (180,000 ft)	Box girder Prestressed concrete	Bang Na Expressway	2001	Bangkok–Bang Pakong District; 13°29′10.7″N 101°00′14.2″E	Bangkok; Chachoengsao	
29	Sixth Thai–Lao Friendship Bridge project	สะพานมิตรภาพไทย–ลาว 6		1,020 m (3,350 ft)	Arch; Steel tied-arch	Mekong	2026	Na Tan District–Lakhonepheng District; 15°55′17.7″N 105°20′36.6″E	Ubon Ratchathani; Laos	

== Planned bridges ==
	Name	Thai	Span	Length	Type	Carries Crosses	Opened	Location	Province	Ref.
1	Phra Samut Chedi Cable Stay Bridge project		660 m (2,170 ft)	1,180 m (3,870 ft)	Cable-stayed; Steel box girder deck, concrete pylons 2x52+156+660+156 +2x52	Road bridge Chao Phraya River		Phra Samut Chedi district–Mueang Samut Prakan district 13°33′42.1″N 100°34′35.2″E	Samut Prakan	
2	Tha Chin River Bridge project		277 m (909 ft)		Extradosed; Concrete box girder deck, concrete pylons 160+277+160	Road bridge Tha Chin River		Mueang Samut Sakhon district 13°30′41.4″N 100°16′38.3″E	Samut Sakhon	

== Other bridges ==
- Black Bridge, Bangkok
- Chaloem La 56 Bridge, Bangkok
- Chamai Maruchet Bridge, Bangkok
- Phan Phiphop Lila Bridge, Bangkok
- Phan Fa Lilat Bridge, Bangkok
- Mahatthai Utit Bridge, Bangkok
- Makkhawan Rangsan Bridge, Bangkok
- Thewakam Rang Rak Bridge, Bangkok
- Han Bridge, Bangkok
- Mon Bridge, Bangkok
- Hok Bridge, Bangkok
- Chang Rong Si Bridge, Bangkok
- Iron Bridge, Bangkok
- Orathai Bridge, Bangkok
- Nakhon Nontaburi Bridge, Nonthaburi
- Naowarat Bridge, Chiang Mai
- Mengrai Anusorn Bridge, Chiang Mai
- Iron Bridge, Chiang Mai
- Wanrat Bridge, Nakhonsawan
- Thep Suda Bridge, Kalasin
- Chom Klao Bridge, Phetchaburi
- Sarasin Bridge, Phang Nga and Phuket
- Phudhum Phabing Samakki Bridge, Loei
- Tinsulanonda Bridge, Songkhla
- Pridi-Thamrong Bridge, Ayutthaya
- Ratchadapisek Bridge, Lampang
- Nam Hueang Friendship Bridge
- Thai–Myanmar Friendship Bridge
- Sai River Bridge
- Second Sai River Bridge
- Rantau Panjang–Sungai Golok Bridge
- Bukit Bunga–Ban Buketa Bridge

== See also ==
- Transport in Thailand
- Rail transport in Thailand
- Thai highway network
- Controlled-access highways in Thailand
- List of bridges in Bangkok
- List of railway bridges and viaducts in Thailand
- List of crossings of the Chao Phraya River
- List of crossings of the Mekong River
- List of rivers of Thailand
- Geography of Thailand

== Notes and references ==
- Notes
- Nicolas Janberg. "International Database for Civil and Structural Engineering". Structurae.com.
- Others references
