= List of crossings of the Chao Phraya River =

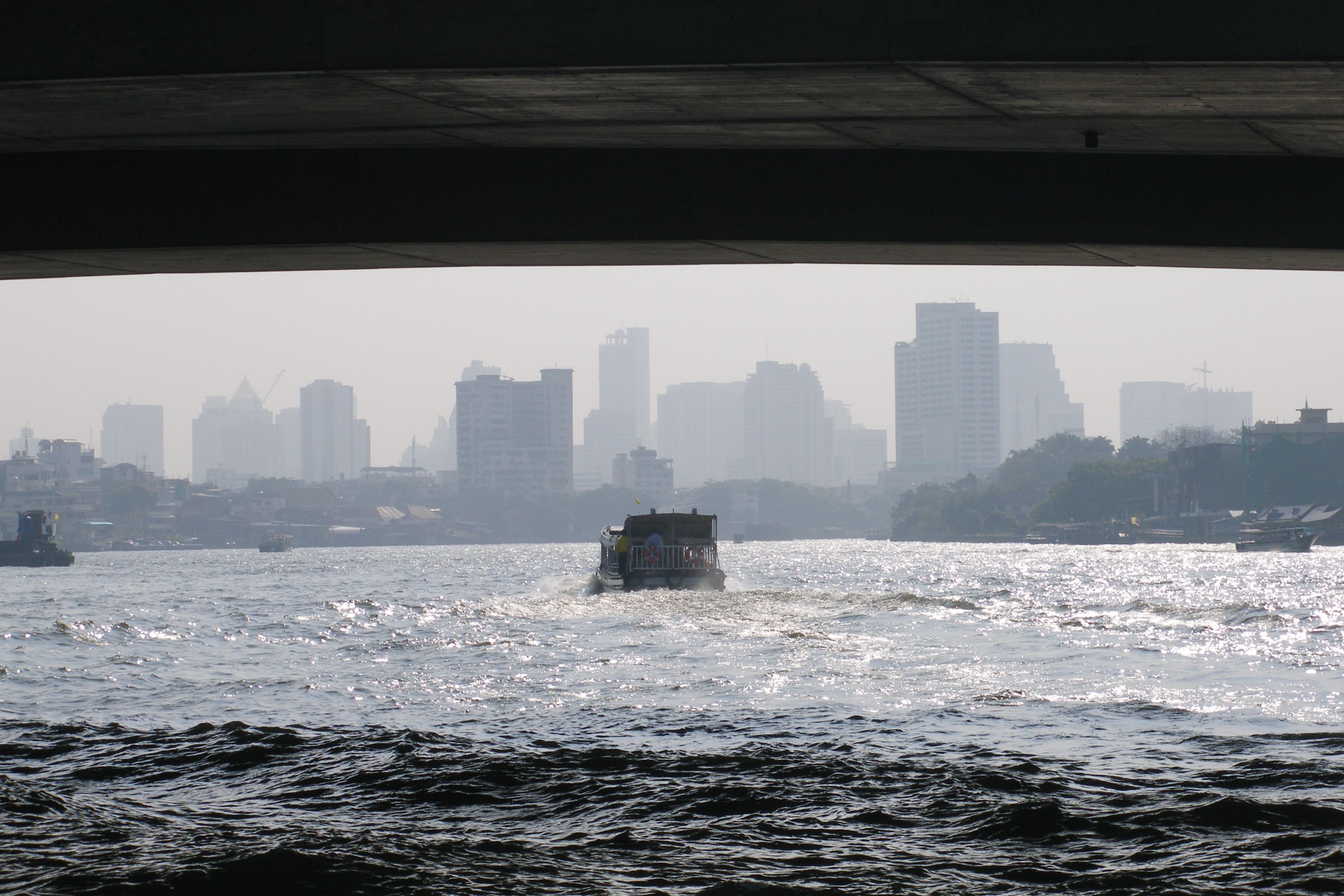
The Chao Phraya River in Bangkok

The Chao Phraya River flows through Central Thailand from the confluence of the Ping and Nan Rivers in Nakhon Sawan Province southward to its mouth in Samut Prakan Province, where it drains into the Gulf of Thailand. The river has long served as an important channel of water transport, although it was only after the opening of Rama VI Bridge in 1927 that a permanent land transport structure existed over the river. This page lists permanent crossings of the Chao Phraya, starting from the river mouth and continuing upstream to its source.

== List ==
Crossing	Date opened	Photo	Type	Total length (m)	Location	Coordinates	Notes
Samut Prakan Province
Kanchanaphisek Bridge	2007		Cable-stayed bridge	951 m	Phra Pradaeng District, Samut Prakan	13°38′05″N 100°32′15″E	The bridge was designed by Parsons Brinckerhoff. The bridge is part of the Kanchanaphisek Expressway, thus there is a toll for its use.
Bhumibol 2 Bridge	2006		Cable-stayed bridge	582m	Phra Pradaeng District, Samut Prakan	13°39′55″N 100°32′22″E	The unofficial name "Mega Bridge" was also widely used.
Bangkok
Bhumibol 1 Bridge	2006		Cable-stayed bridge	702m	Yan Nawa District, Bangkok, and Phra Pradaeng District, Samut Prakan	13°39′55″N 100°32′22″E	The unofficial name "Mega Bridge" was also widely used.
Rama IX Bridge	1987		Cable-stayed bridge	781.20 m	Rat Burana and Yan Nawa Districts, Bangkok	13.682058°N 100.519001°E	The bridge was named in honour of King Bhumibol Adulyadej's 60th birthday; the opening date coincides with the King's birthday. It was the first cable-stayed bridge in Thailand and had the second longest cable-stayed span in the world when it opened in 1987.
Krungthep Bridge	1959		Bascule bridge Truss bridge	626.25 m	Thonburi and Bang Kho Laem Districts, Bangkok	13°42′4″N 100°29′30″E	Constructed by Fuji Car Manufacturing Co., Ltd, with a budget of 31,912,500 baht.
Rama III Bridge	1999		Box girder bridge	2,170 m	Thonburi and Bang Kho Laem Districts, Bangkok	13.701519°N 100.492619°E	Designed to alleviate traffic congestion on the adjacent Krungthep Bridge. Known as the New Krungthep Bridge.
Taksin Bridge	1982		Box girder bridge	1,791 m	Khlong San, Bang Rak, and Sathon Districts, Bangkok	13.718791°N 100.512543°E	The bridge was designed with a large gap between opposing traffic directions to accommodate a canceled mass transit system. The disused foundations were eventually adapted for the BTS Skytrain, with train services across the bridge beginning on 15 May 2009.
Phra Pok Klao Bridge	1984		Box girder bridge	745 m	Phra Nakhon and Khlong San Districts, Bangkok	13.738999°N 100.498981°E	The bridge was designed to alleviate traffic congestion on the adjacent Memorial Bridge. The bridge is composed of 3 viaducts, with the central viaduct designed to carry future mass transit links. As of December 2007 there are no plans to use the central viaduct.
Memorial Bridge	1932		Truss bridge	678 m	Phra Nakhon and Thonburi Districts, Bangkok	13°44′21″N 100°29′51″E	Most commonly known as Phra Phutthayotfa Bridge (สะพานพระพุทธยอดฟ้า), after King Phra Phutthayotfa Chulalok (Rama I), the first king of the Chakri Dynasty.
MRT Blue Line tunnel	2019		Rail tunnel	??	Phra Nakhon and Bangkok Yai Districts, Bangkok		Between Sanam Chai and Itsaraphap MRT stations. It is the only railway tunnel under a river in Thailand
Phra Pin Klao Bridge	1973		Box girder bridge	658 m	Near the Grand Palace; Phra Nakhon and Bangkok Noi Districts, Bangkok	13°45′43″N 100°29′28″E	Named after Pinklao, vice-king of Siam 1851-66.
Rama VIII Bridge	2002		Cable-stayed bridge	475 m	Phra Nakhon and Bang Phlat Districts, Bangkok	13°46′9″N 100°29′48.5″E	The world's largest asymmetric cable-stayed bridges. The bridge was designed to alleviate traffic congestion on the adjacent Phra Pin-klao Bridge and Krung Thon Bridge.
Krung Thon Bridge	1958		Truss bridge	648.90 m	Dusit and Bang Phlat Districts, Bangkok	13.780892°N 100.502951°E	Known as Sang Hi Bridge
Kiakkai Bridge							Under construction
MRT Blue Line bridge	2019		Box girder bridge	??	Bang Sue and Bang Phlat Districts, Bangkok		Between Bang Pho and Bang O MRT stations.
Prachim Ratthaya Expressway	2016				Bang Sue and Bang Phlat Districts, Bangkok		
Rama VI Bridge	1927		Truss bridge	441.44 m	Bang Sue and Bang Phlat Districts, Bangkok	13.813108°N 100.515826°E	Railway bridge of the southern line between Bang Son (ground-level) and Bang Bamru stations. Was a mixed railway-road bridge in the past.
Nonthaburi Province
Light Red Line commuter railway bridge	2012		Box girder bridge	??	Bang Sue, and Bang Kruai District, Nonthaburi	13.813108°N 100.515826°E	Between Bang Son (elevated) and Bang Bamru stations. Running parallel to Rama VI Bridge
Rama VII Bridge	1992		Box girder bridge	933.19 m	Bang Sue District, Bangkok, and Bang Kruai District, Nonthaburi	13.813775°N 100.514442°E	
Maha Chesadabodindranusorn Bridge	2015		Extradosed bridge	460 m	Mueang Nonthaburi District, Nonthaburi	13.854331°N 100.479841°E	
Rama V Bridge	2002		Box girder bridge	430 m	Mueang Nonthaburi District	13.832496°N 100.495312°E	
MRT Purple Line bridge	2006		Box girder bridge	400 m	Mueang Nonthaburi District	13.87011°N 100.47647°E	Between Phra Nang Klao Bridge and Sai Ma MRT stations. Adjacent to Phra Nang Klao Bridge.
Phra Nang Klao Bridge	1985		Box girder bridge	329.10 m	Mueang Nonthaburi District	13.870362°N 100.476194°E	
Phra Nang Klao Parallel Bridge	2008		Box girder bridge	299.10 m	Mueang Nonthaburi District	13.871497°N 100.476215°E	Running parallel to Phra Nang Klao Bridge.
Rama IV Bridge	2006		Box girder bridge	278 m	Pak Kret District, Nonthaburi	13.915802°N 100.493875°E	
Pathum Thani Province
Nonthaburi Bridge	1959		Truss bridge	260.20 m	Mueang Pathum Thani District, Pathum Thani, and Pakkret District, Nonthaburi	13.947656°N 100.535052°E	Known as Nuan Chawi Bridge.
Pathum Thani 2 Bridge	2009		Box girder bridge	278.10 m	Mueang Pathum Thani District	13.96383°N 100.536°E	
Pathum Thani Bridge	1984		Box girder bridge	239.10 m	Mueang Pathum Thani District	14.02609°N 100.53882°E	
Phra Nakhon Si Ayutthaya Province
Chiang Rak Bridge	??		Box girder bridge	??	Bang Sai District, Phra Nakhon Si Ayutthaya, and Sam Khok District, Pathum Thani		
Ko Koet Bridge	??		Box girder bridge	??	Bang Pa-in District, Phra Nakhon Si Ayutthaya		
Ko Rian Bridge	??		Box girder bridge	??	Phra Nakhon Si Ayutthaya District, Phra Nakhon Si Ayutthaya		
Kasattrathirat Bridge	??		Roving bridge	??	Phra Nakhon Si Ayutthaya District, Phra Nakhon Si Ayutthaya		
Ayutthaya–Phukhao Thong Bridge	??		Box girder bridge	??	Phra Nakhon Si Ayutthaya District, Phra Nakhon Si Ayutthaya		
Chula Mani Bridge	Under construction		Box girder bridge	??	Bang Ban District, Phra Nakhon Si Ayutthaya		
Ang Thong Province
Pa Mok Bridge	??		Box girder bridge	??	Pa Mok District, Ang Thong		
Liang Mueang Ang Thong Bridge	??		Box girder bridge	??	Mueang District, Ang Thong		
Ang Thong Bridge	??		Box girder bridge	??	Mueang District, Ang Thong		
Phra Maha Phutthaphim 1 Bridge	??		Box girder bridge	??	Chaiyo District, Ang Thong		
Sing Buri Province
Phrom Buri Bridge	??		Box girder bridge	??	Phrom Buri District, Sing Buri		
Anuson 100 Pi Sing Buri (Luang Pho Phae 99) Bridge	??		Box girder bridge	??	Mueang District, Sing Buri		
Sing Buri Bridge	??		Box girder bridge	??	Mueang District, Sing Buri		
In Buri Bridge	??		Box girder bridge	??	In Buri District, Sing Buri		
Chai Nat Province
Sapphaya Bridge	??		Box girder bridge	??	Sapphaya District, Chai Nat		
Chao Phraya Dam	1957		Barrage dam	237.5 m	Sapphaya District, Chai Nat	15.158°N 100.180°E	
Chai Nat Bridge	??		Box girder bridge	??	Mueang Chai Nat District, Chai Nat		
Thammajak Bridge	2018		Box girder bridge	??	Mueang Chai Nat District, Chai Nat		Connects Tambon Tha Chai with central municipal area. Construction cost: 510 million baht.
Nakhon Sawan Province
Somdet Phra Wannarat (Heng Khemachari) Bridge	1995		Box girder bridge	??	Phayuha Khiri District, Nakhon Sawan		
Takhian Luean Bridge	??		Box girder bridge	??	Mueang Nakhon Sawan District, Nakhon Sawan		
Dechatiwong 2 Bridge	1971		Box girder bridge	??	Mueang Nakhon Sawan District, Nakhon Sawan	15.688257°N 100.123594°E	
Dechatiwong 1 Bridge	1950		Tied-arch bridge	??	Mueang Nakhon Sawan District, Nakhon Sawan	15.688257°N 100.123594°E	Closed for memorial. Open only emergency situation.
Dechatiwong 3 Bridge	1993		Box girder bridge	??	Mueang Nakhon Sawan District, Nakhon Sawan	15.688257°N 100.123594°E	

== See also ==
- List of crossings of the Ping River
- List of crossings of the Wang River
- List of crossings of the Yom River
- List of crossings of the Nan River
