= Maha Chesadabodindranusorn Bridge =

Maha Chesadabodindranusorn Bridge สะพานมหาเจษฎาบดินทรานุสรณ์
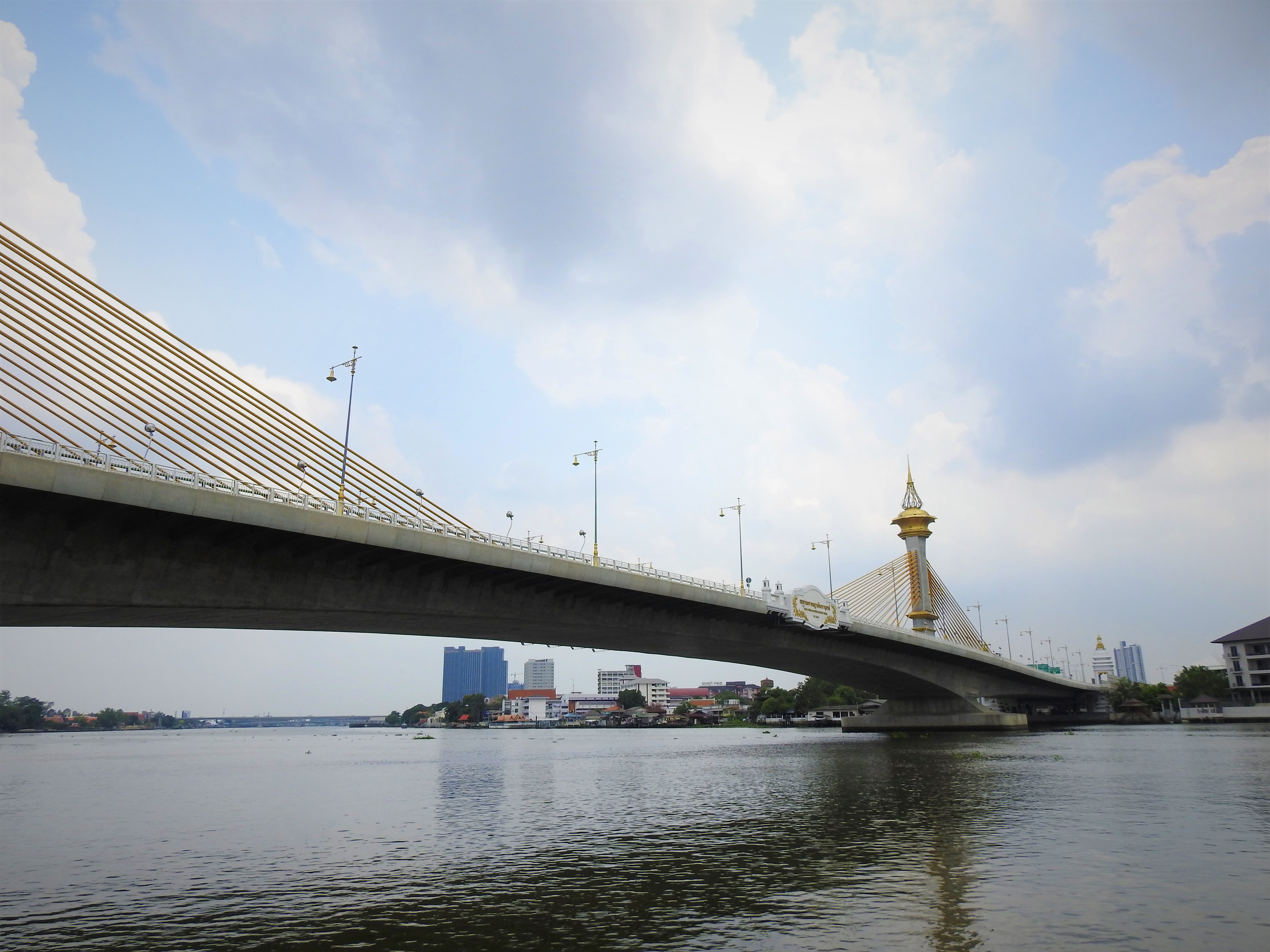
- Coordinates: 13.854331°N 100.479841°E
- Carries: 6-lane extradosed concrete bridge
- Crosses: Chao Phraya River
- Locale: Nonthaburi, Thailand

Characteristics
- Design: Extradosed bridge
- Total length: 460 m
- Longest span: 200 m

History
- Construction start: May 2012
- Construction end: December 2014

Location
- Interactive map of Maha Chesadabodindranusorn Bridge

Maha Chesadabodindranusorn Bridge (Thai: สะพานมหาเจษฎาบดินทรานุสรณ์, RTGS: Saphan Mahachetsadabodinthranuson, pronounced [sa.pʰāːn ma.hǎː.t͡ɕèːt.sa.dāː.bɔ̄(ː).dīn.tʰrāː.nú.sɔ̌ːn]) is an extradosed bridge in area of Mueang Nonthaburi District in Nonthaburi Province, Thailand, over the Chao Phraya River. The bridge is the first extradosed bridge in Thailand. It is located between Phra Nangklao Bridge (upstream) and Rama V Bridge (downstream), connects Nonthaburi 1 Road, on the east side of the river, and Bang Si Mueang - Wat Bot Don Phrom Road and Ratchaphruek Road, on the west side of the river. The bridge was named after King Nangklao, one of whose titles before his accession to the throne was "Prince Chesadabodin".

The project has a total length of approximately 4.3 kilometres (2.7 mi), consisting of an interchange at Nonthaburi 1 Road, a 6-lane extradosed concrete bridge with 200 metres (660 ft) long main span and the total length of 460 metres (1,510 ft), an intersection at Bang Si Mueang - Wat Bot Don Phrom Road, and a 6-lane at-grade road to an interchange at Ratchaphruek Road. Construction began in May 2012, after having been delayed for two years, and took around thirty months. It is a part of the completed main road linking network developed by the Department of Rural Roads (DRR) in the area on the west side of the river, to ease the traffic on Rama V Bridge, Phra Nangklao Bridge and Rama IV Bridge.

== Gallery ==
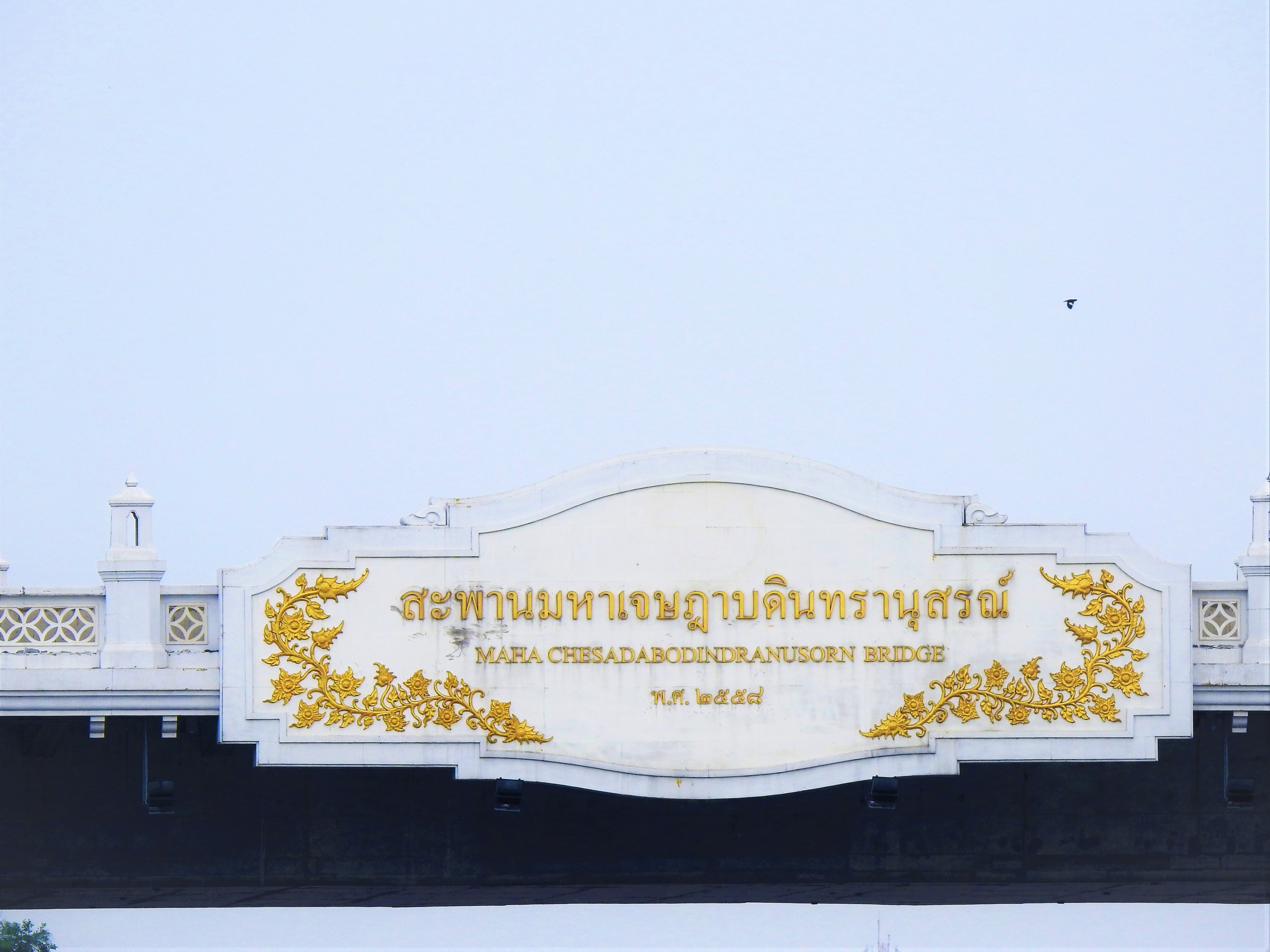

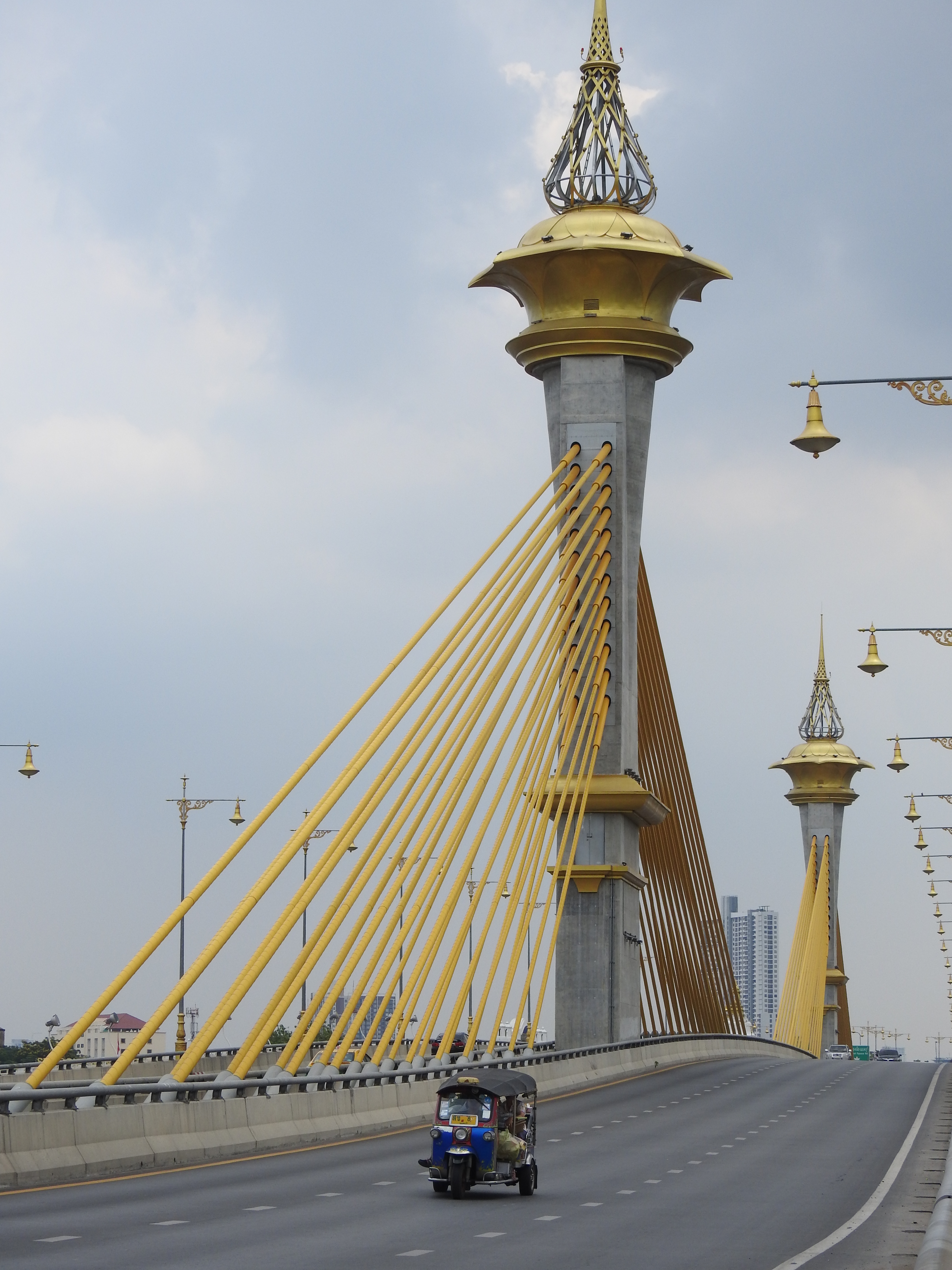

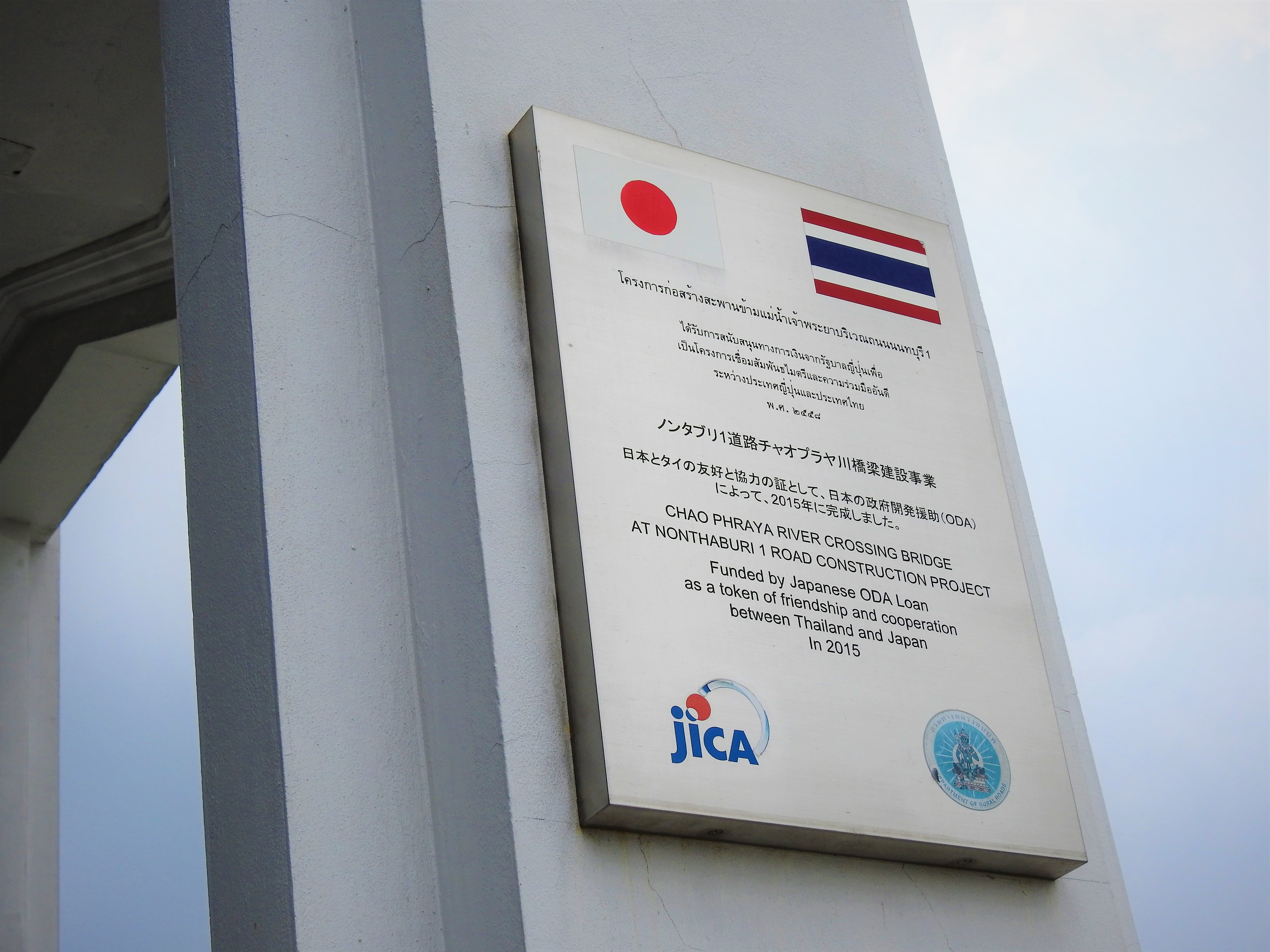

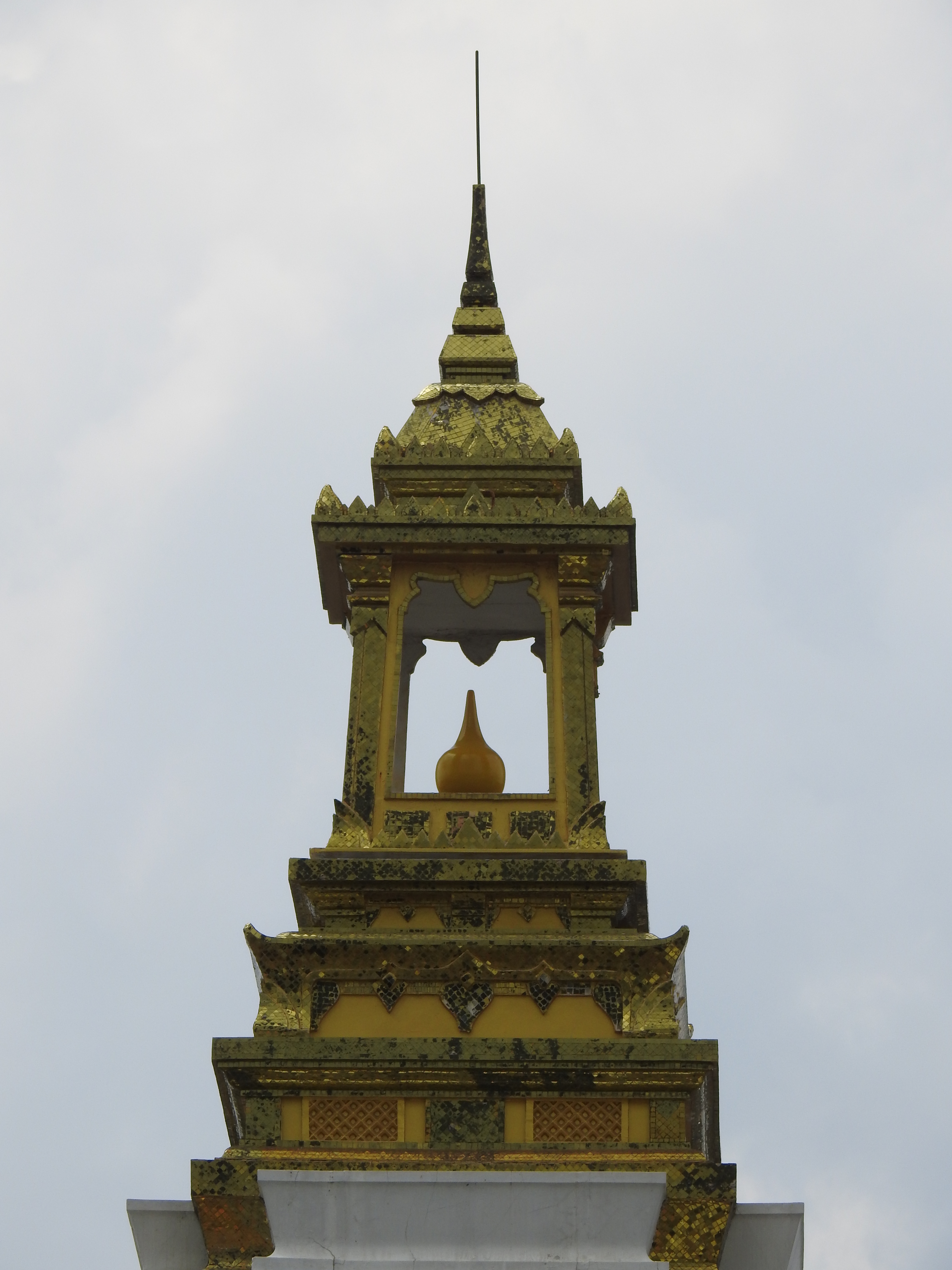

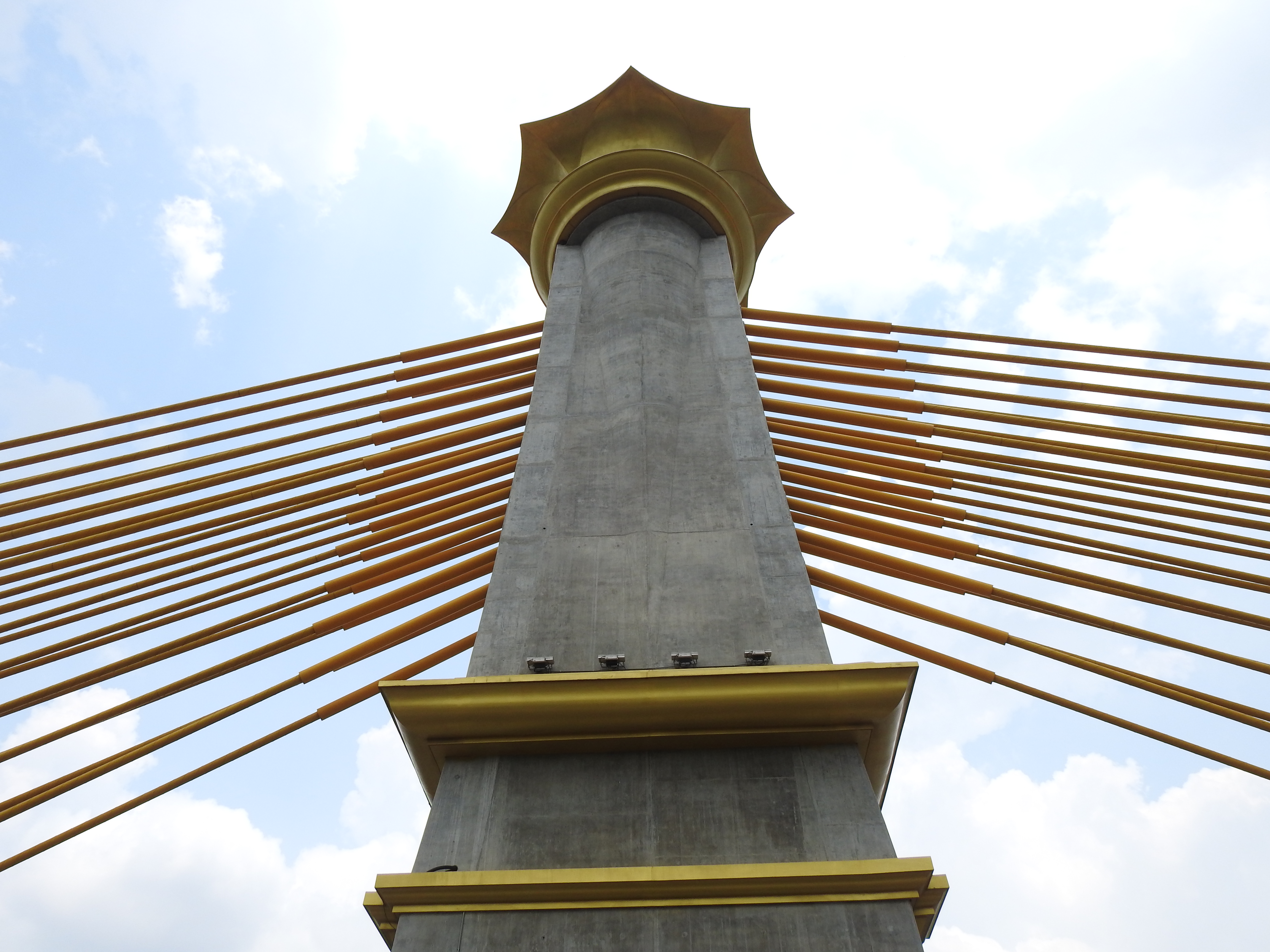
