= Murder of Nualchawee Petchrung =

1959 Thai murder case

- Date: 10 September 1959; 67 years ago
- Attack type: Homicide
- Deaths: 1
- Victim: Nualchawee Petchrung
- Perpetrator: Athip Suyansethakarn
- Charges: Murder
- Verdict: Guilty

The front page of Siang Ang Thong newspaper, reporting on the death sentence received by Athip Suyansethakarn. Its coverage of the case fuelled the newspaper's popularity.

Nualchawee Petchrung (Thai: นวลฉวี เพชรรุ่ง, also spelled Nuanchawee) was a Thai nurse who was murdered by her medical doctor husband, Athip Suyansethakarn, on 10 September 1959. The investigation and trial received sensational coverage in the media—Siang Ang Thong newspaper, which later became the country's top circulating daily Thai Rath, gained popularity from its coverage of the case, which regularly filled the front page—and the case became one of the best known murders in Thailand. Athip was found guilty and sentenced to death, but was later pardoned. Nonthaburi Bridge, where her body was disposed into the Chao Phraya River, is still commonly known as Nualchawee Bridge, and evidence from the case is on display at the Songkran Niyomsane Forensic Medicine Museum.
