= Phra Nang Klao Bridge =

Bridge in Thailand

Phra Nang Klao Bridge สะพานพระนั่งเกล้า
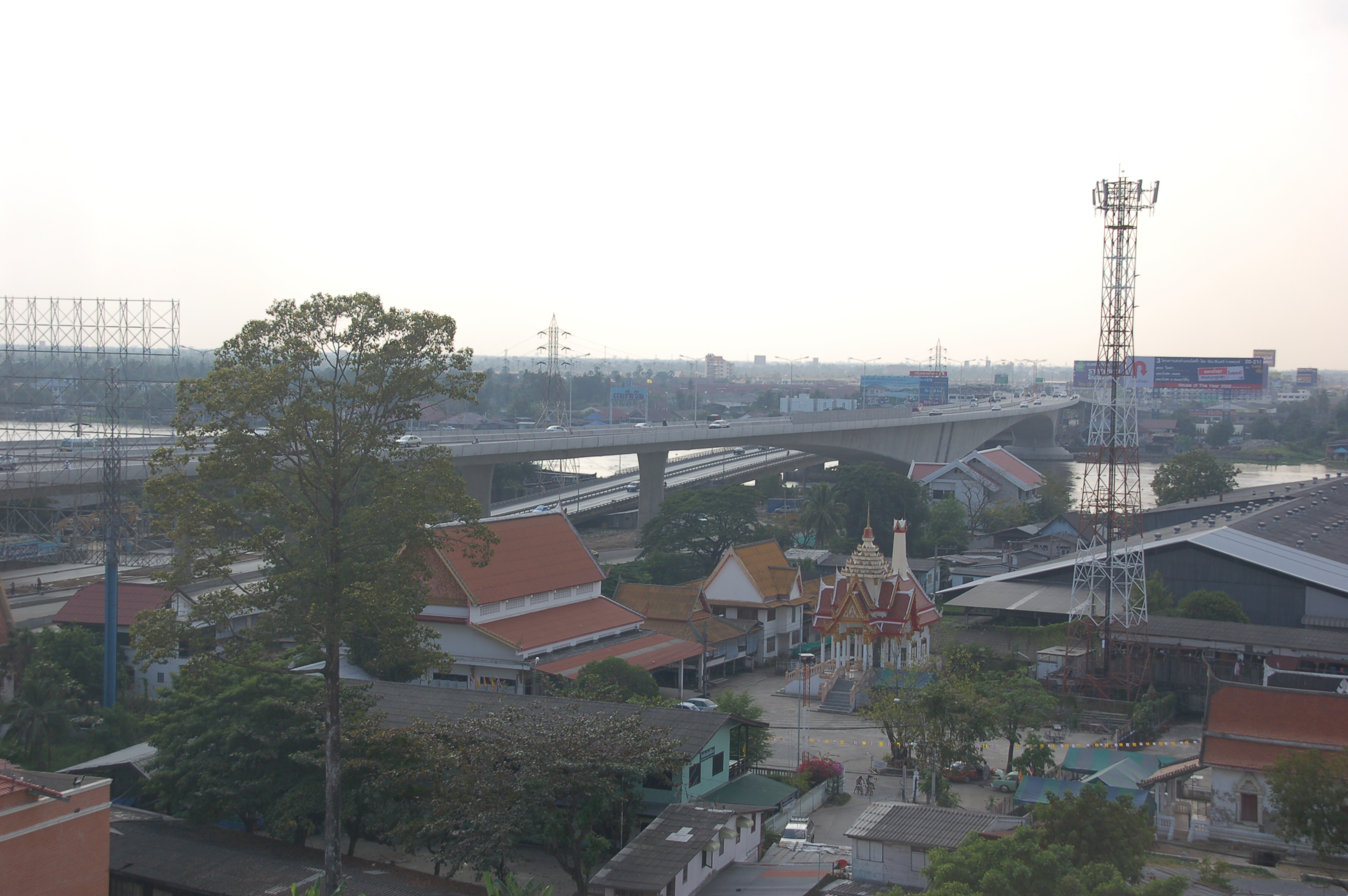
- Phra Nang Klao Bridge (below)
- Coordinates: 13.870362°N 100.476194°E
- Carries: Rattanathibet Road (4 traffic lanes), pedestrians
- Crosses: Chao Phraya River
- Locale: Sai Ma and Bang Kraso with Suan Yai, Nonthaburi, Thailand
- Preceded by: Phra Nang Klao Parallel Bridge
- Followed by: Maha Chesadabodindranusorn Bridge

Characteristics
- Design: Prestressed concrete box-girder bridge
- Total length: 329.10 m (viaduct 216 m on both sides of Nonthaburi)
- Width: 21.80 m
- Height: 7.40 m

History
- Construction start: September 3, 1983
- Opened: July 23, 1985

Location
- Interactive map of Phra Nang Klao Bridge

Phra Nang Klao Bridge (Thai: สะพานพระนั่งเกล้า, RTGS: Saphan Phra Nangklao, pronounced [sā.pʰāːn pʰráʔ nâŋ.klâːw]) is a 4-lane bridge over Chao Phraya River in the area of Mueang Nonthaburi District, Nonthaburi Province.

In addition to crossing Chao Phraya River, the bridge also connects the area between Sai Ma and Bang Kraso with Suan Yai Subdistricts together along Rattanathibet Road (Highway 302). At present, there is a 6-lane parallel bridge straddling over the bridge.

Phra Nang Klao Bridge started construction in 1983 and completed 1985 (along with Pathum Thani Bridge) by the Department of Rural Roads (DRR), with a total budget of 505.77 million baht.

The bridge was named in honours King Nangklao (Rama III), the third monarch of Chakri Dynasty, who has a mother (Queen Sri Sulalai) from Nonthaburi.

The entry ramp on the east side of the river contains the Phra Nang Klao Bridge MRT station (PP08) on MRT Purple Line.

== Neighbouring places ==
- Phra Nang Klao Hospital
