= Rama IV Bridge =

Bridge in Thailand

Rama IV Bridge สะพานพระราม ๔
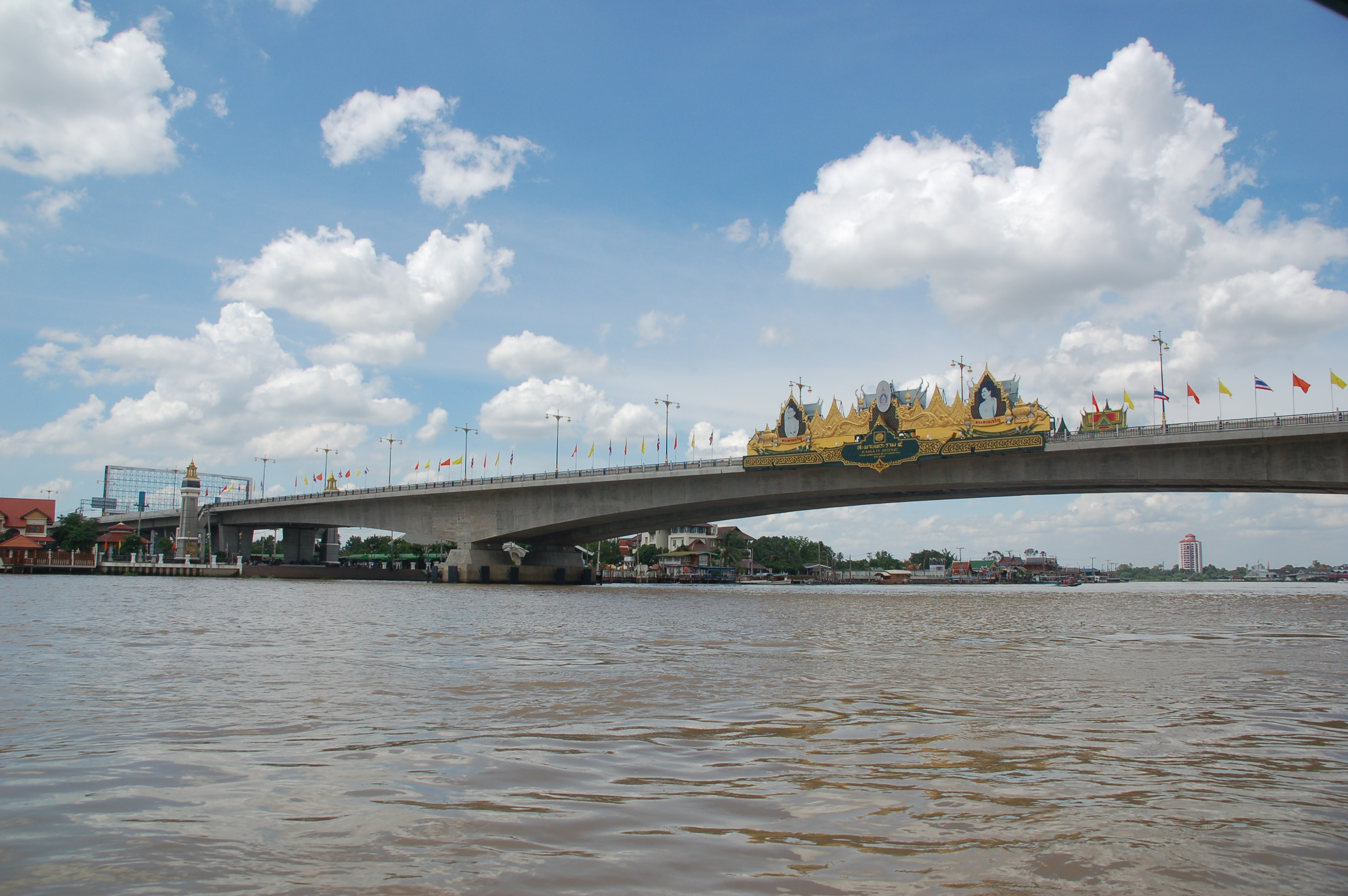
- Coordinates: 13.915802°N 100.493875°E
- Carries: Chaeng Wattana and Chaiyaphruek Roads (6 traffic lanes), pedestrians
- Crosses: Chao Phraya River
- Locale: Pak Kret and Bang Tanai, Pak Kret, Nonthaburi, Thailand
- Preceded by: Nonthaburi Bridge
- Followed by: Phra Nangklao Parallel Bridge

Characteristics
- Design: Prestressed concrete box-girder bridge
- Total length: 278.00 m
- Width: 40.00 m
- Height: 5.60 m
- Longest span: 134.00 m (viaduct 72 m on each side)

History
- Construction start: December 1, 2003
- Opened: August 21, 2008

Location
- Interactive map of Rama IV Bridge

Rama IV Bridge (Thai: สะพานพระราม ๔, RTGS: Saphan Phra Ram Si, pronounced [sā.pʰāːn pʰráʔ rāːm sìː]) is a bridge over Chao Phraya River in the area of Pak Kret District, Nonthaburi Province, outskirts Bangkok.

Rama IV Bridge is a bridge across Chao Phraya River, connecting Bang Tanai and Pak Kret Subdistricts in Pak Kret District, northeastern Nonthaburi Province. It is not related to Rama IV Road in Bangkok in any way.

The bridge has been built since the end of 2003 by the Department of Rural Roads (DRR) to alleviate traffic, and considered part of Chaeng Watthana Road (Highway 304) and Chaiyaphruek Road. Total budget is used 1,511.72 million baht.

The construction was completed in late 2006. King Bhumibol (Rama IX) named it 'Rama IV' in order to remember King Mongkut (Rama IV). King Vajiralongkorn (Rama X, while he was a Crown Prince) along with his wife Princess Srirasmi presided over the official opening ceremony on August 21, 2008.

Wat Bo temple and Pak Kret Pier (P33) are beneath a bridge on the bank of Pak Kret. While small isle Ko Kret is on the left side of the bridge (from Pak Kret side).
