= Sarasin Bridge =

Bridge in Thailand

Sarasin Bridge สะพานสารสิน
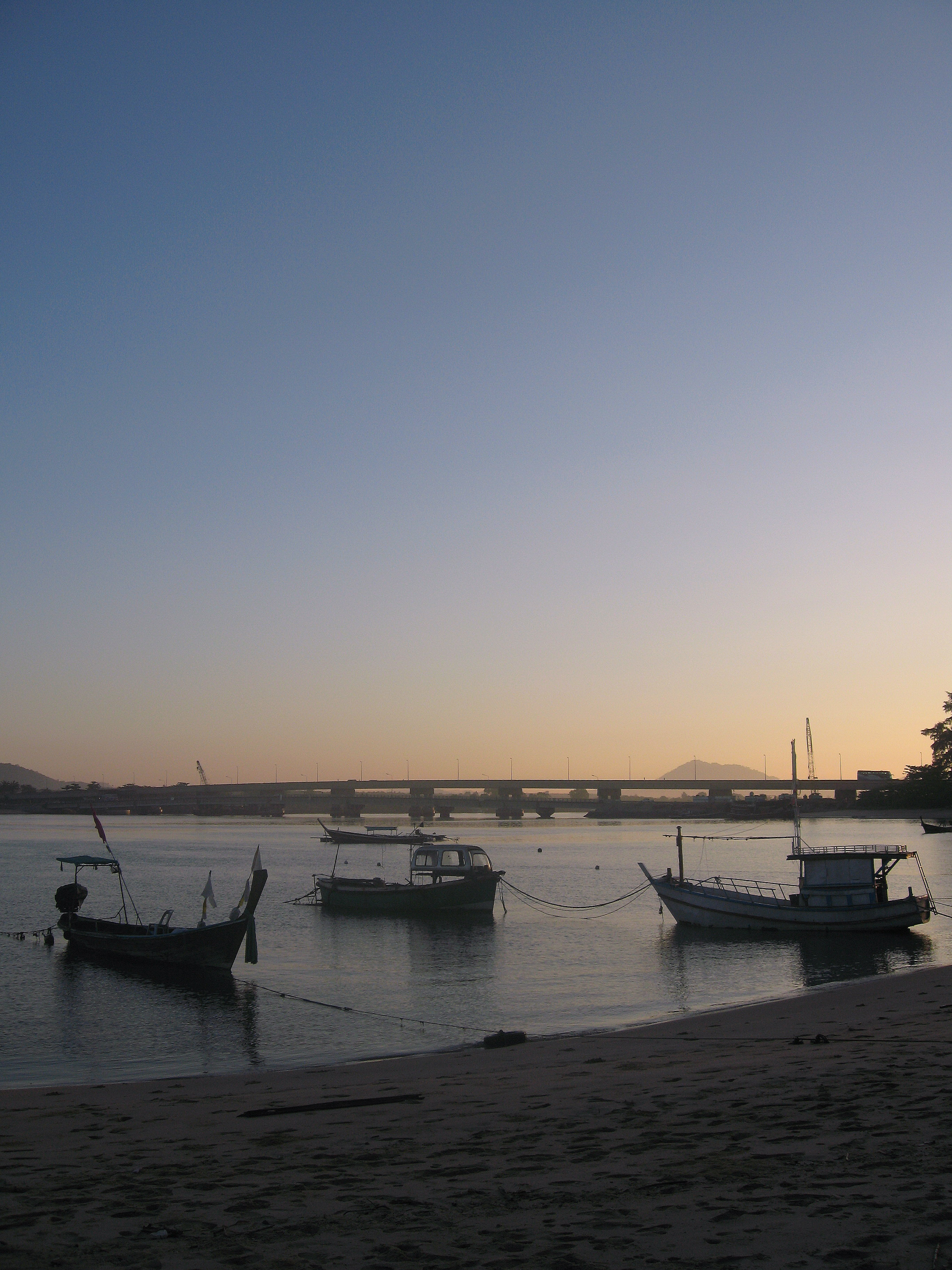
- Remote view of Sarasin Bridge
- Coordinates: 8.201518°N 98.298032°E
- Carries: Highway 402 (Thepkasattri Road), Pedestrians
- Crosses: Andaman Sea
- Locale: Ban Tha Chatchai, Thalang, Phuket and Ban Tha Nun, Takua Thung, Phang Nga
- Official name: Sarasin Bridge
- Maintained by: Department of Highways, Ministry of Transport

Characteristics
- Total length: 660 m
- Width: 11 m

History
- Construction start: 1951
- Opened: July 7, 1967

Sarasin Bridge (Thai: สะพานสารสิน, RTGS: Saphan Sarasin, pronounced [sā.pʰāːn sǎː.rā.sǐn]) is a bridge in Thailand which connects the island of Phuket with Phang Nga in southern Thailand.

It was built in 1951 and officially opened on July 7, 1967. It was the first bridge linking Phuket and Phang Nga, with a total length of 660 m (2,165.4 ft) and a total budget of 28,770,000 baht. It was named after Pote Sarasin, a former Prime Minister of Thailand, during his time as the Minister of National Development.

On February 22, 1973, the bridge was the site of an unforgettable tragedy. Two young lovers, Dam Sae-tan and Kanchana "Gew" Sae-ngo, jumped from the bridge together after they were forbidden from being together. Dam was a local songthaew (local bus) driver and rubber tapping worker. He came from a poor family and struggled to make ends meet. Gew was a teachers college student who used to ride on Dam’s bus. Gew came from a wealthy family and was expected to marry someone who was also rich. As the two got to know each other, they began to fall in love. They sought Gew’s father’s blessing to get married, but he refused their plea and forbade them from seeing each other ever again. Their love having been stifled by Gew’s father, the couple decided that if they couldn’t be together in this life, then they would take their own lives. On the night of February 22, 1973, they bound themselves together with a loincloth and jumped from the Sarasin Bridge.

The story of the two lovers is forever imprinted in Phuket’s collective memory. In the year 1987, the story was also made into a Thai film titled "Saphan Rak Sarasin" (สะพานรักสารสิน; Sarasin, The Bridge of Love, starring Chintara Sukapatana and Ron Banjongsang). Sarasin Bridge has since become a tourist attraction and is well-known in Phuket and Phang Nga.

At present, Sarasin Bridge does not provide services for cars to run through as in the past. Since the construction of a new bridge adjacent named "Thepkasattri Bridge" (สะพานเทพกษัตรี, or popularly known as New Sarasin Bridge or Sarasin II Bridge) since 2011, Sarasin Bridge is only a pedestrian bridge with light poles and pavilions installed for sightseeing.
