= Phra Pradaeng (town) =

Phra Pradaeng พระประแดง
- Town Municipality
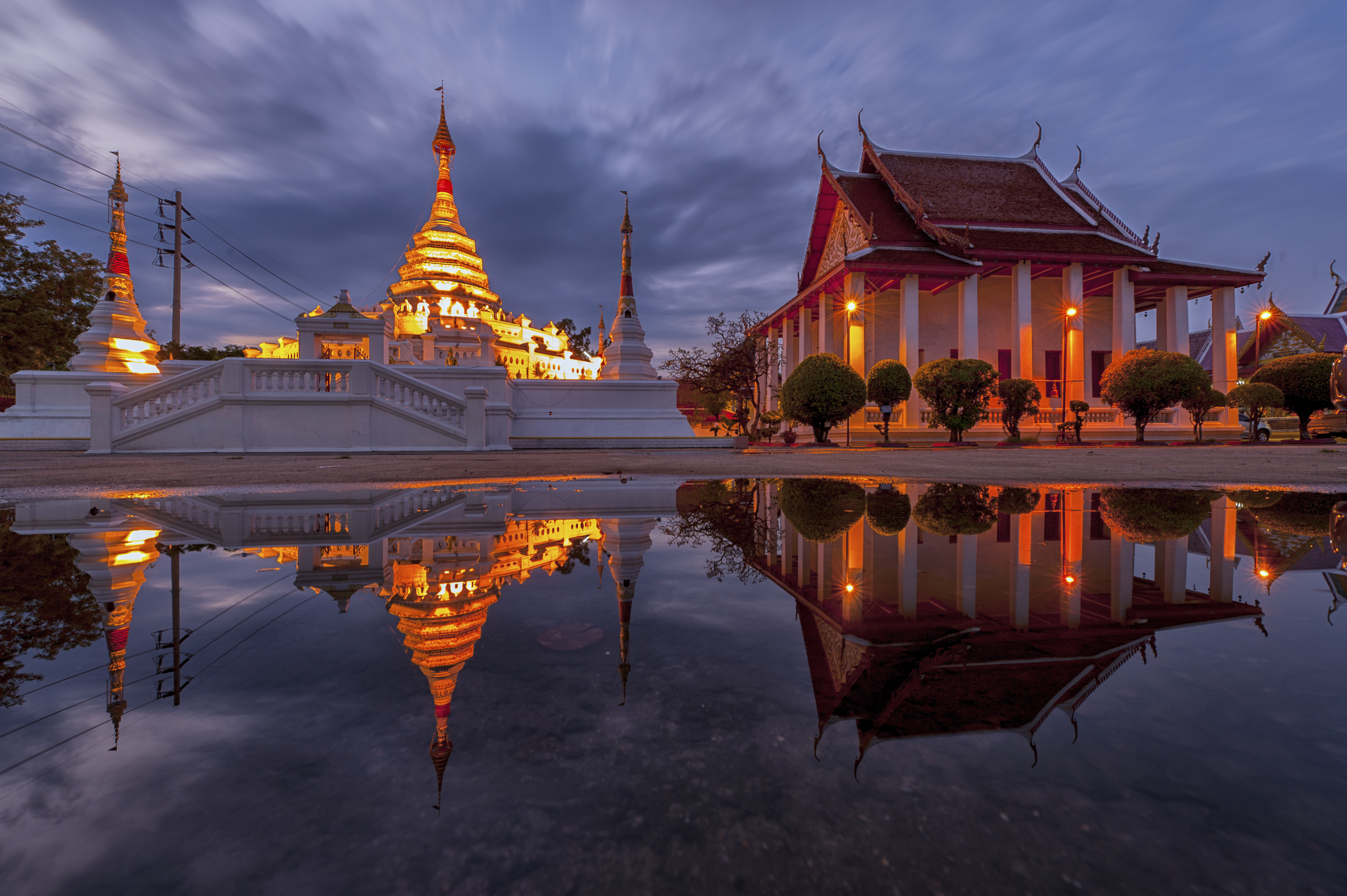
- Wat Songtham Worawihan

- Location in Bangkok Metropolitan Region
- Coordinates: 13°39′33″N 100°31′59″E
- Country: Thailand
- Province: Samut Prakan
- District: Phra Pradaeng

Population (2014)
  - Total: 10,190
- Time zone: UTC+7 (ICT)
- Area code: (+66) 34

Phra Pradaeng (Thai: พระประแดง) is a town (Thesaban Mueang) in the Phra Pradaeng District (Amphoe) of Samut Prakan Province in the Bangkok Metropolitan Region of Central Thailand. In 2014, it had a total population of 10,190 people.

== Name and early history ==
Walailak Songsiri traces the name to the Khmer royal style kamrateng. The word became an official rank, recorded in the Three Seals Law as phadaeng (ผแดง), pha-daeng (ผะแดง) and pa-daeng (ปะแดง), and passed by way of the name of an excavated image into the name of the port and frontier town. On her account the town was a frontier post older than Ramathibodi I, at the point where Khlong Samrong was cut through to Khlong Thap Nang and the Bang Pakong River, which opened an inland route to the coast and the eastern towns.
