= Bhumibol Bridge =

Bridge in Bangkok, Thailand

Bhumibol Bridge สะพานภูมิพล
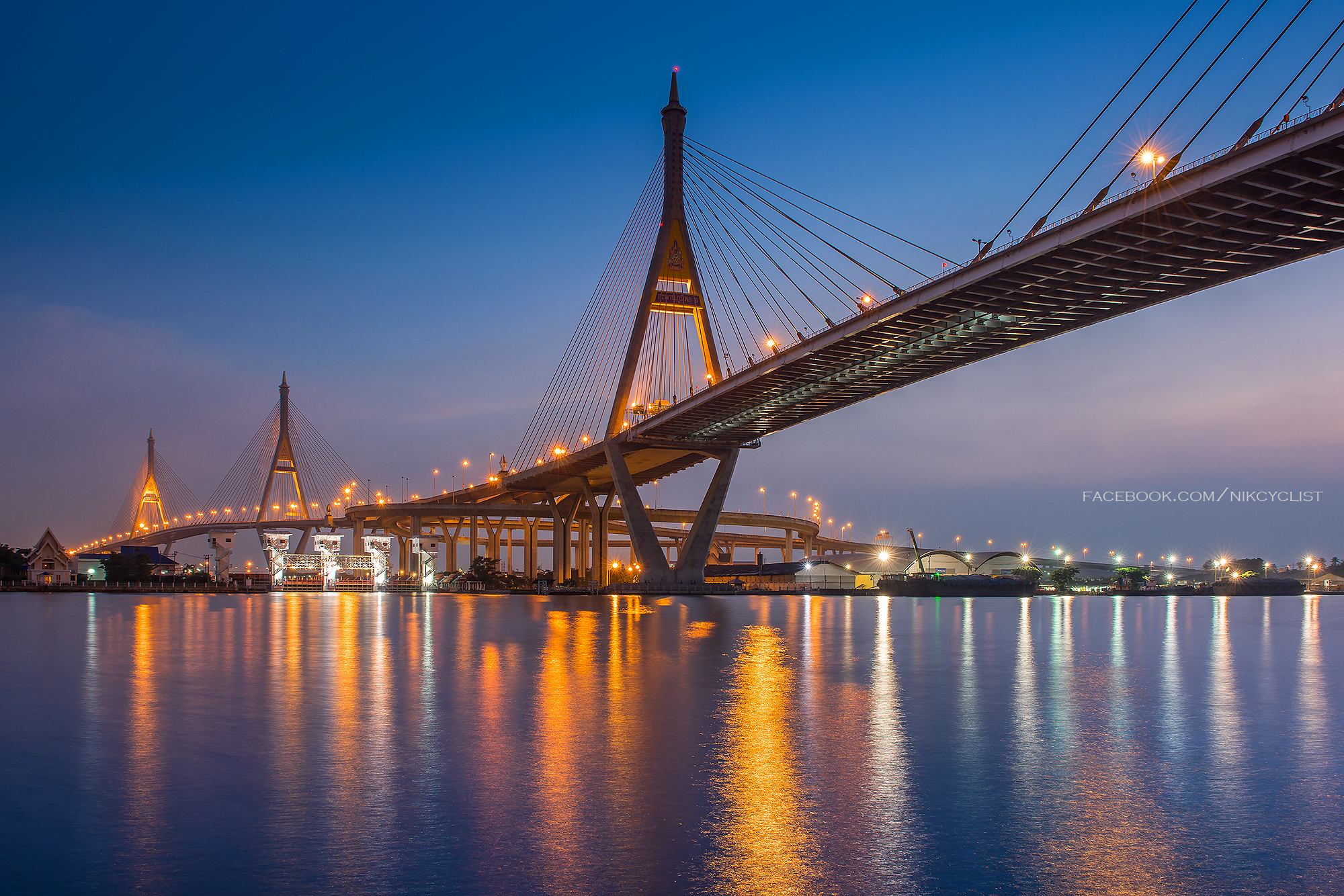
- Coordinates: 13°39′55″N 100°32′22″E
- Crosses: Chao Phraya River
- Locale: Bang Ya Phraek, Phra Pradaeng, Samut Prakan, Thailand
- Official name: Bhumibol Bridge
- Other name(s): Industrial Ring Road Bridge, Mega Bridge

Characteristics
- Design: Cable-stayed bridge
- Total length: 702 metres (2,303 ft) and 582 metres (1,909 ft)
- Height: 50 metres (160 ft) and 50 metres (160 ft)
- Longest span: 326 metres (1,070 ft) and 398 metres (1,306 ft)

History
- Opened: 5 December 2006

Location
- Interactive map of Bhumibol Bridge

The Bhumibol Bridge (Thai: สะพานภูมิพล, RTGS: Saphan Phumiphon), also known as the Industrial Ring Road Bridge (Thai: สะพานวงแหวนอุตสาหกรรม, RTGS: Saphan Wongwaen Utsahakam) is a road bridge in southern Bangkok, Thailand. It is part of the 13 km (8.1 mi) long Industrial Ring Road connecting southern Bangkok with Samut Prakan province. The bridge crosses the Chao Phraya River twice, with two striking cable-stayed spans of lengths of 702 m (2,303 ft) and 582 m (1,909 ft) supported by two diamond-shaped pylons 173 m (568 ft) and 164 m (538 ft) high. Where the two spans meet, another road rises to join them at a free-flowing interchange suspended 50 m (160 ft) above the ground.

The bridge opened for traffic on 20 September 2006, before the official opening date of 5 December 2006. It is part of the Bangkok Industrial Ring Road, a royal scheme initiated by King Bhumibol Adulyadej that aimed to solve traffic problems within Bangkok and surrounding areas, especially the industrial area around Khlong Toei Port, southern Bangkok, and Samut Prakan province.

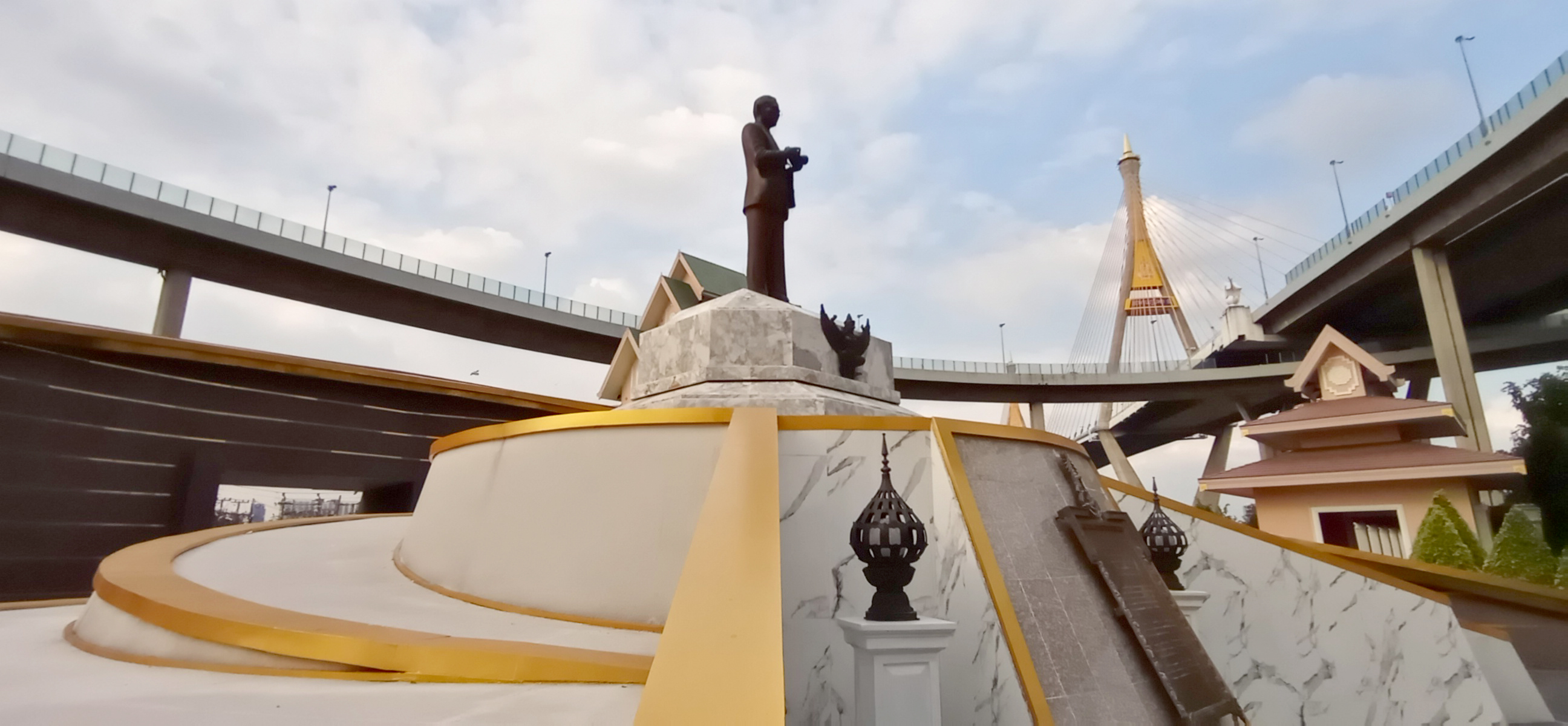
The bridges and Statue of King Bhumibol Adulyadej in Lat Pho Park

According to tradition, all bridges over the Chao Phraya in Bangkok are named after a member of the royal family. In October 2009, it was announced that both bridges would be named after King Bhumibol Adulyadej, with the northern bridge officially named "Bhumibol 1 Bridge" and the southern bridge "Bhumibol 2 Bridge". The unofficial name "Mega Bridge" was also widely used.

The bridge was featured on the Discovery Channel. Even though the bridges are the fastest way to drive from Phra Pradaeng district, Samut Prakan Province to Bangkok, motorcycles were banned from using the two Bhumibol bridges from 1 November 2018 due to safety concerns.

== Structure ==
- Bhumibol Bridge 1 is the northern bridge connecting Yan Nawa District, Bangkok and Phra Pradaeng District. It is a cable-stayed bridge with seven lanes together with two high pillars. The structure is reinforced concrete 50 m (160 ft) above water level.
- Bhumibol Bridge 2 is the southern bridge. The structure is almost the same as Bhumibol Bridge 1, with seven lanes and two high pillars and built using reinforced concrete 50 m (160 ft) above the level of the river.

== Gallery ==
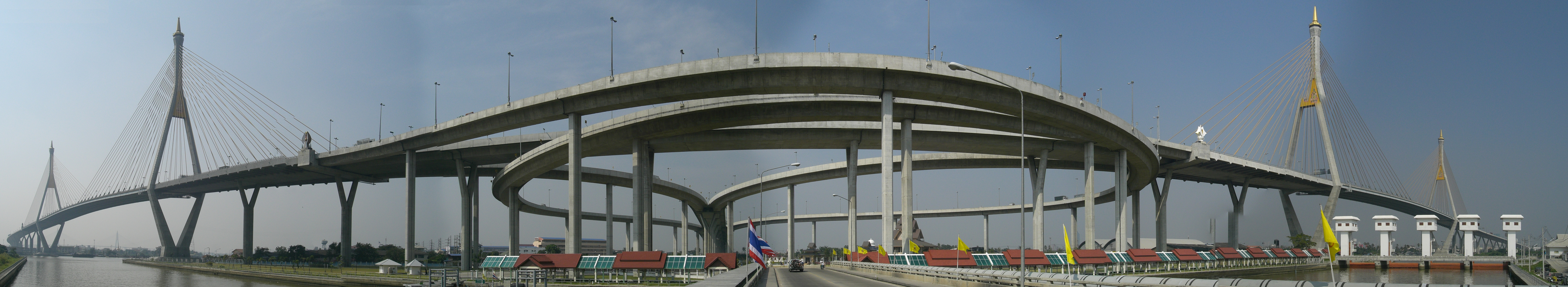
View of both bridges
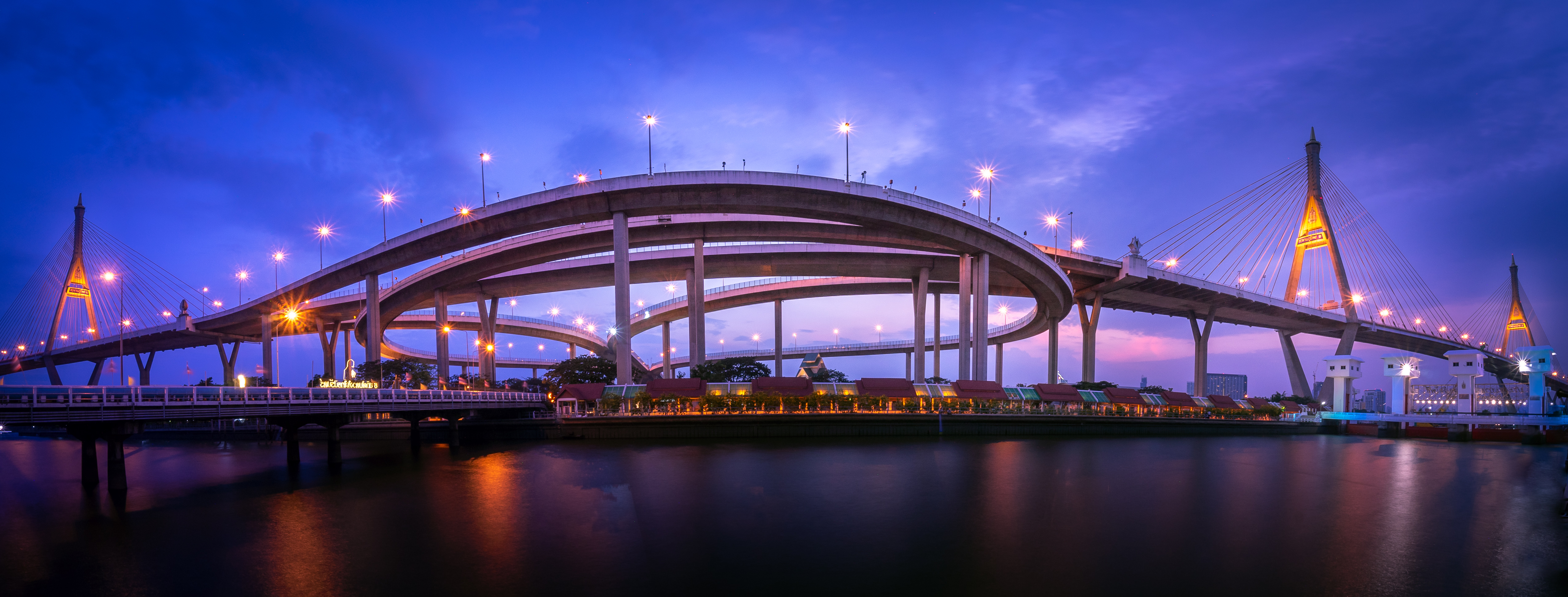
Night shot of the Industrial Ring Road Bridge in May 2019
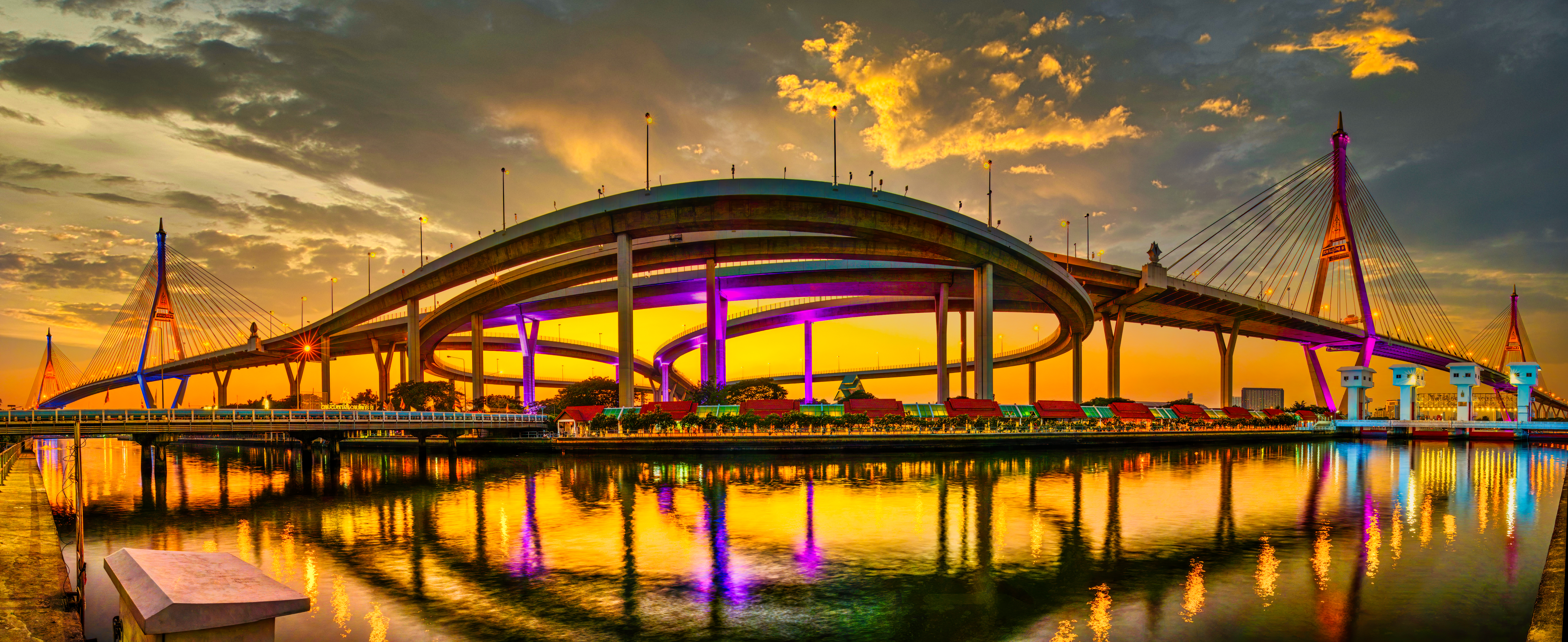
Panorama sunset
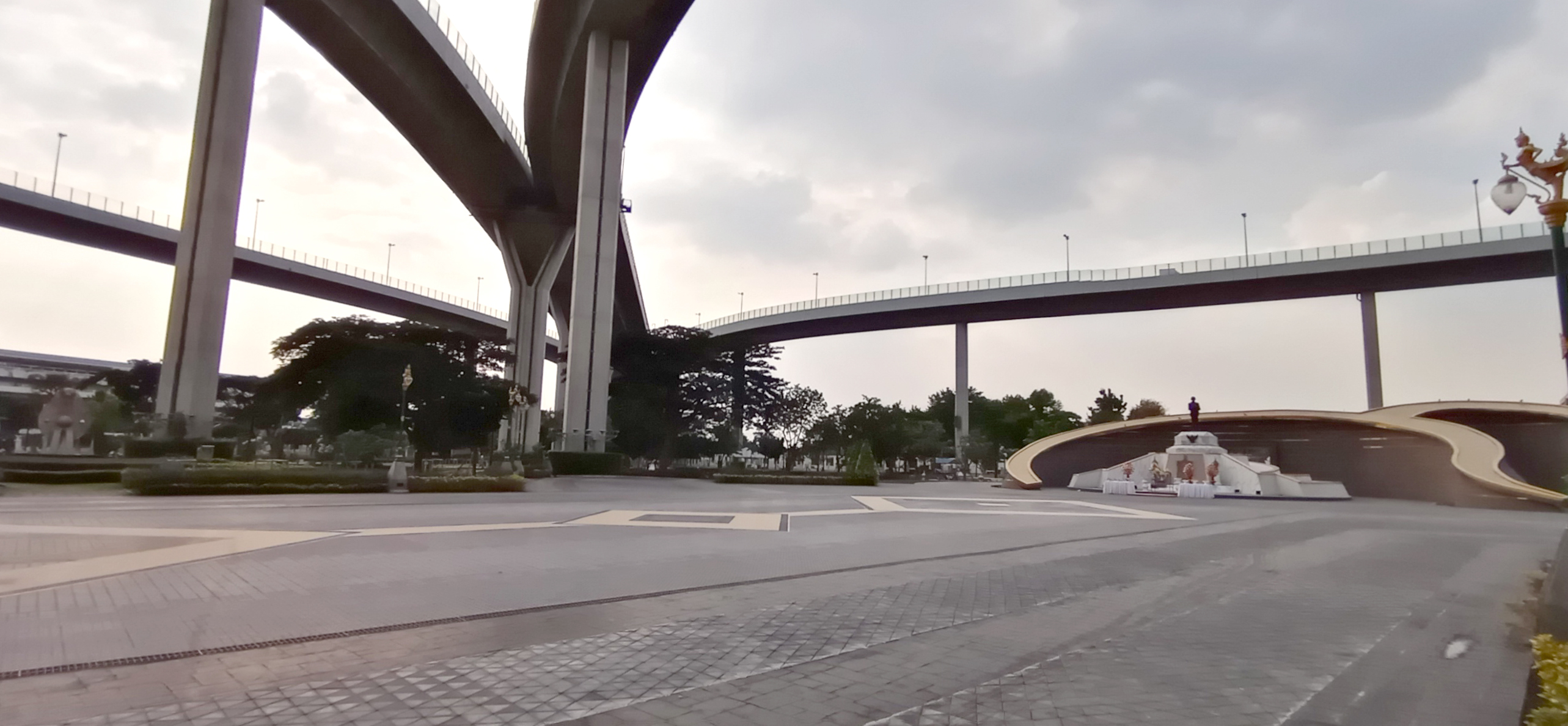
View under both bridges from Lat Pho Park (a statue at right is the statue of King Bhumibol Adulyadej)

== See also ==
- King Bhumibol Adulyadej
