= Rama V Bridge =

Rama V Bridge สะพานพระราม ๕
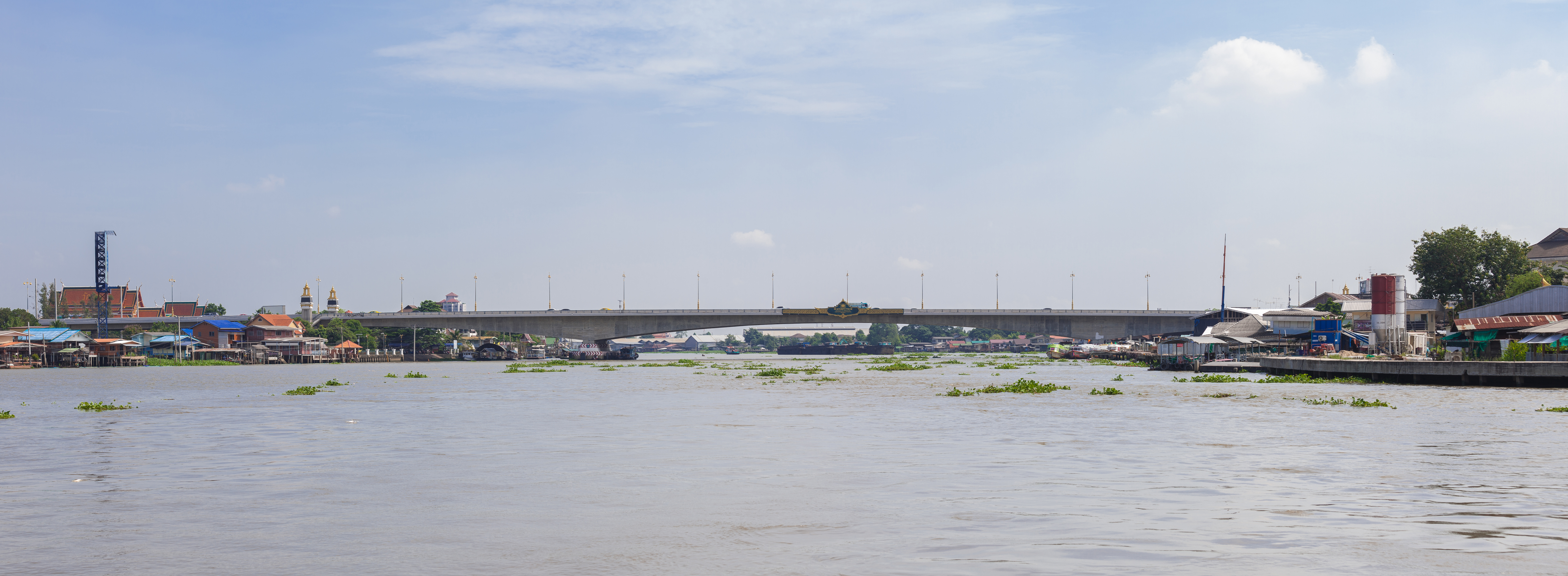
- Coordinates: 13.8325°N 100.4953°E
- Carries: 6 lanes of roadway, pedestrians
- Crosses: Chao Phraya River
- Locale: Nonthaburi, Thailand

Characteristics
- Total length: 320 m
- Width: 29.10 m
- Height: 7.90 m
- Longest span: 130 m

History
- Construction start: November 1, 1999
- Opened: June 21, 2002

Location
- Interactive map of Rama V Bridge

The Rama V Bridge (Thai: สะพานพระราม 5, RTGS: Saphan Phra Ram Ha, pronounced [sā.pʰāːn pʰráʔ rāːm hâː]) is a bridge across the Chao Phraya River in Nonthaburi Province, Thailand. The bridge was named in the honour of King Chulalongkorn (Rama V). It is not related to Rama V Road in Dusit District, Bangkok.

== Structure ==
Rama V Bridge is a bridge with 6 carriages with traffic lanes at a high level of 7.90 meters above sea level, bridge width of 29.10 meters and a total length of 320 meters (130 meters in the middle of the bridge and two long sides 95 meters on each side). The bridge is a closed continuous concrete type. The upper structure is prestressed concrete.

== History ==
The construction of Rama V Bridge began on November 1, 1999, with Sumitomo Mitsui Construction and Italian-Thai Development as co-developers under the responsibility of the Department of Public Works and Town & Country Planning. The construction had a budget of 6,915,000,000 baht set aside by Suan Yai sub-district. On the Suan Yai side, the bridge was built alongside Soi Phibun Songkram 13 (Buri Rangsan) which is located beside Wat Nakhon In. The bridge was therefore commonly known as Wat Nakhon In Bridge (Thai: สะพานวัดนครอินทร์) during the construction.

Once the construction was finished, the Department of Public Works and Town & Country Planning worked with the Fine Arts Department to find an official name for Wat Nakhon In Bridge. It was decided to name the bridge after a king of the reigning Chakri Dynasty, which followed the examples of other bridges over the Chao Phraya that had been built or were in construction, such as Phra Nang Klao, Phra Pok Klao, Rama VII and Rama VIII Bridge. King Chulalongkorn (Rama V) was identified as the most suitable for his patronage of Nonthaburi province, including development initiatives and visits to the province. Moreover, the bridge is located close to both Rama VI Bridge and Rama VII Bridge, which are named after sons of Rama V. In naming the bridge after Rama V, three possible options were considered:

- Rama V Bridge (สะพานพระราม 5)
- Phra Chula Chom Klao Bridge (สะพานพระจุลจอมเกล้า)
- Chulalongkorn Bridge (สะพานจุฬาลงกรณ์)

The Department of Public Works and Town & Country Planning requested a royal name from King Bhumibol, who bestowed the name of Rama V Bridge. The alternative names of Phra Chula Chom Klao Bridge and Chulalongkorn Bridge had previously been given to bridges in other parts of the country: Chula Chom Klao Bridge for a railway bridge over the Tapi River in Phunphin district, Surat Thani province, and Chulalongkorn Bridge for a road-rail bridge over the Mae Klong River in Mueang Ratchaburi district, Ratchaburi province, previously known as Ratchaburi Bridge.

The bridge officially opened for traffic on 21 June 2002, which was also the year that Nonthaburi province celebrated being 453 years old. WBC bantamweight world boxing match between Veeraphol Sahaprom and Julio Coronel from Mexico in 2002 was part of the opening ceremony to celebrate the bridge.
