= Nonthaburi Bridge =

Nonthaburi Bridge สะพานนนทบุรี
- Coordinates: 13°56′52″N 100°32′06″E
- Crosses: Chao Phraya River
- Locale: Pak Kret, Nonthaburi and Mueang Pathum Thani, Pathum Thani, Thailand

Characteristics
- Design: 2-lane truss bridge
- Total length: 260.20 m
- Width: 12.00 m
- Height: 7.50 m

History
- Construction start: 31 August 1954
- Construction end: 24 June 1959

Location
- Interactive map of Nonthaburi Bridge

Nonthaburi Bridge (Thai: สะพานนนทบุรี, RTGS: Saphan Nonthaburi, pronounced [sā.pʰāːn nōn.tʰá(ʔ).bū.rīː]), also commonly known as Nuanchawee Bridge (สะพานนวลฉวี, RTGS: Saphan Nuanchawi, [sā.pʰāːn nūan.tɕʰā.wǐː]), is a truss bridge spanning the Chao Phraya River between the Nonthaburi and Pathum Thani Provinces in Thailand. Opened in 1959, it carries national highway route 307, and is among the earliest bridges to cross the Chao Phraya. The bridge became known by the name Nuanchawee due to it being a location in the murder of Nualchawee Petchrung, a sensational crime in 1959.

Today the bridge remains an important link between Pathum Thani town and Bangkok's main eastern bank. In 2014, concerns were raised that the bridge's low clearance of 5.3 metres (17 ft) was an obstacle to river shipping in the rainy season. Plans were made to raise the bridge, but were later scrapped due to the potential adverse effects on traffic.
