= Department of Rural Roads =

- กรมทางหลวงชนบท; Krom Thang Luang Chonnabot
- Seated Narayana with hoe in one hand and plumb bob in another

Department overview
- Formed: 3 October 2002; 23 years ago
- Preceding Department: Office of Accelerated Rural Development
- Headquarters: Bangkok, Thailand
- Annual budget: 46,077.7 million baht
- Minister responsible: Montri Dechasakulsom
- Parent Department: Ministry of Transport
- Website: drr.go.th

Department of Rural Roads (DRR) (Thai: กรมทางหลวงชนบท) is a department of the Thai government, under the Ministry of Transport. It maintains rural roads, under a different numbering scheme from national roads, which are managed by the Department of Highways (DOH), กรมทางหลวง, Krom Thang Luang).

== Definition ==
The 1992 Highway Act (Thai: พระราชบัญญัติทางหลวง พ.ศ. 2535), revised as the 2006 Highway Act (Thai: พระราชบัญญัติทางหลวง (ฉบับที่ 2) พ.ศ. 2549), defines five highway types.

A rural highway (Thai: ทางหลวงชนบท) or rural road is a highway which the Department of Rural Roads constructs and maintains. Registration of rural highways is overseen by the director general of the DRR.

== Road numbering ==
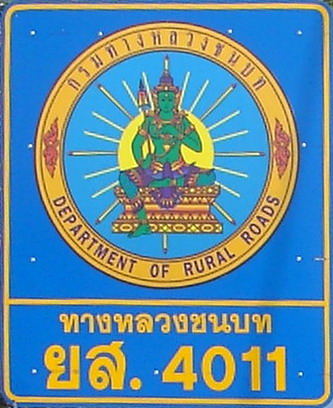
DRR road sign

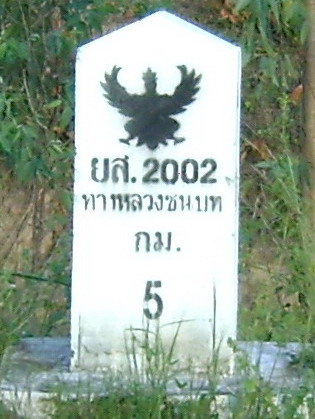
DRR milestone

Rural road signs are gold-on-blue, with a two-letter provincial designation prefixed to the road number. Depicted is YS4011, a rural road in Yasothon Province. The rural road network measures some 35,000 km, about 82% of which is paved.

== See also ==
- Thai motorway network
- Road signs in Thailand
