= Box girder bridge =

Type of bridge

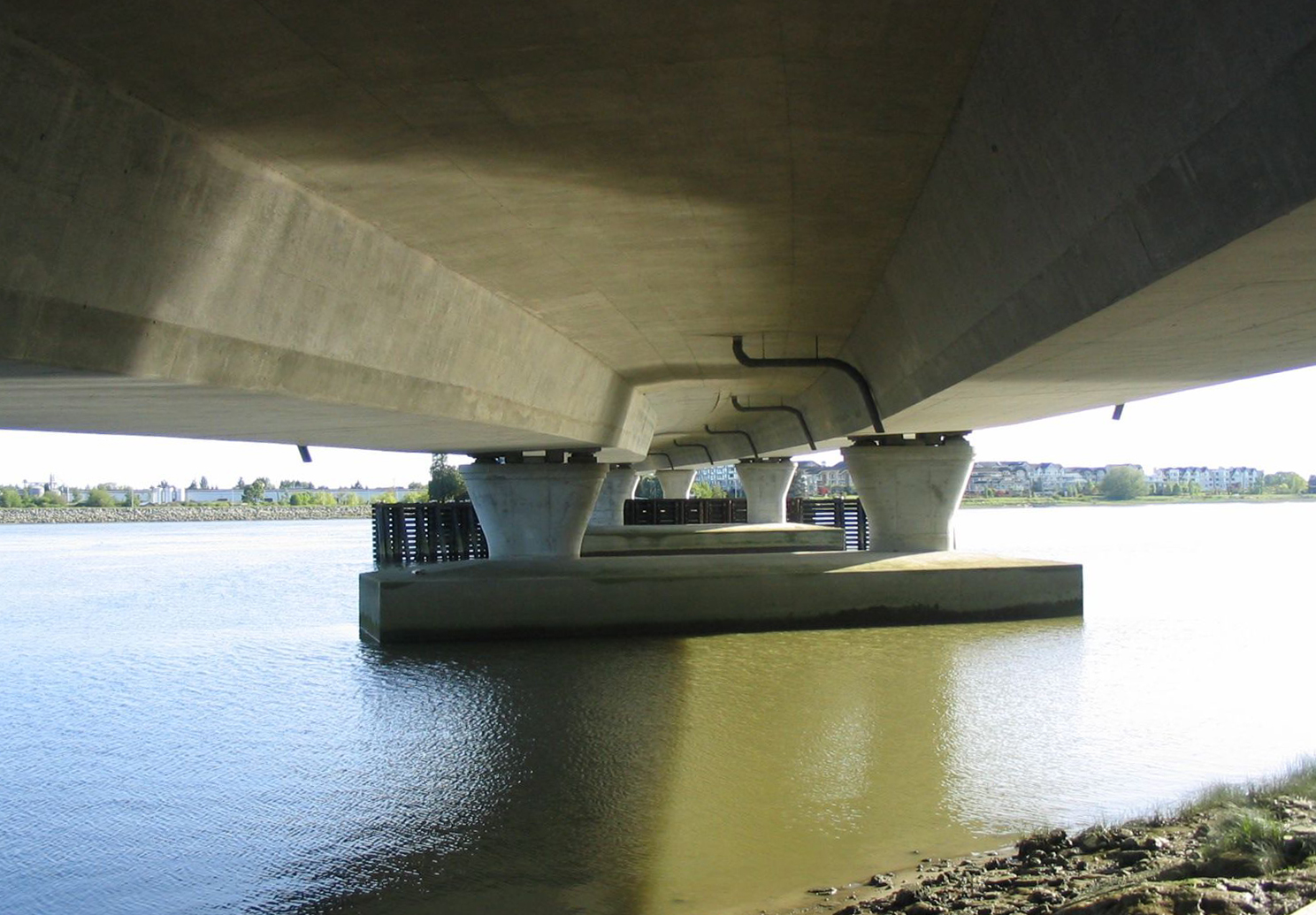
- Underneath the No. 2 Road Bridge in Richmond, British Columbia, Canada
- Ancestor: Tubular bridge
- Related: jetway, skyway
- Descendant: segmental bridge
- Carries: Pedestrians, automobiles, trucks, light rail, heavy rail
- Span range: Medium
- Material: Steel, reinforced concrete, prestressed concrete
- Movable: Possible
- Design effort: High
- Falsework required: Yes, if cast-in-place reinforced or prestressed concrete is used, which is typical for freeway overpasses

Section of a twin box girder bridge

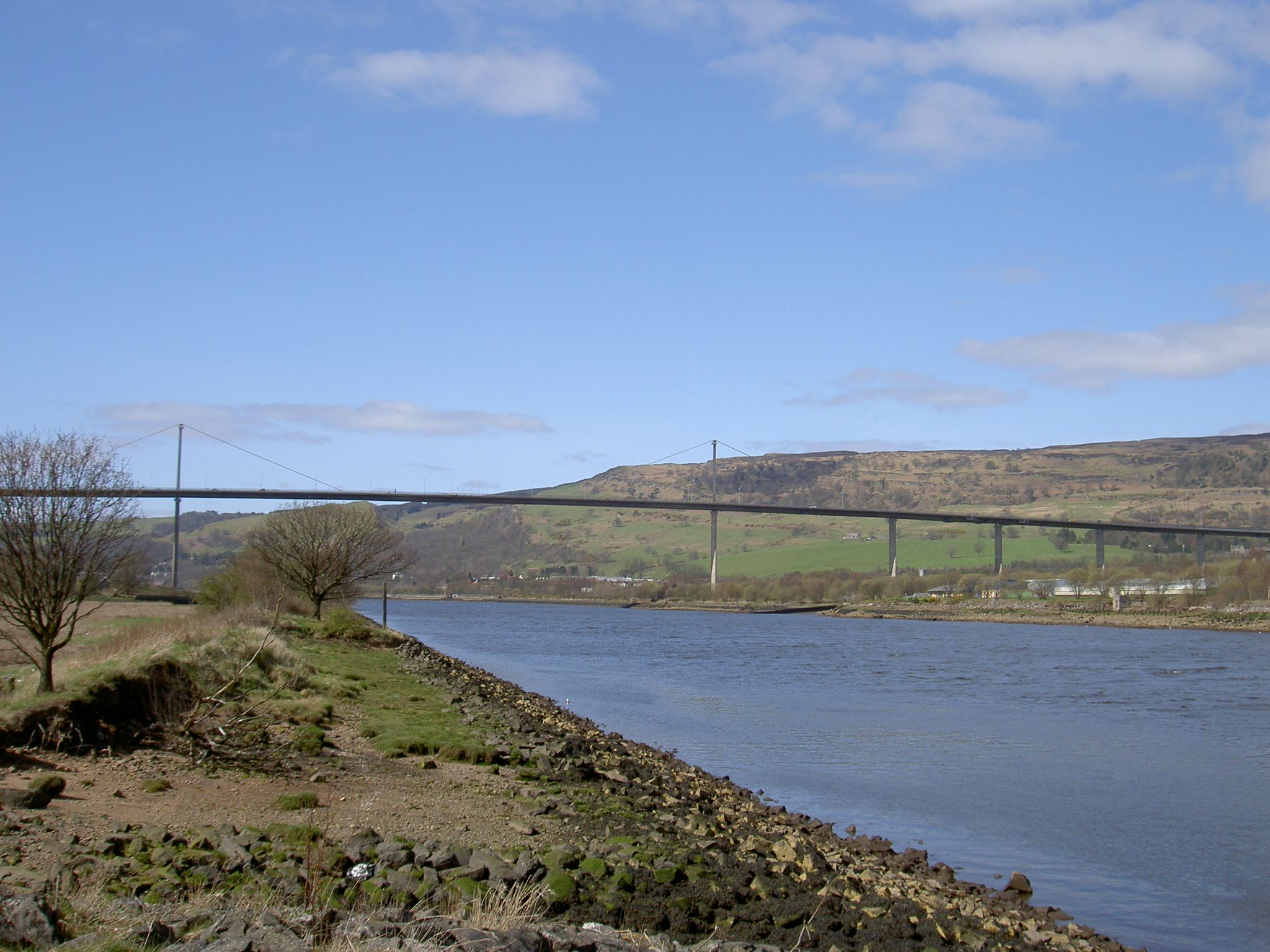
Erskine Bridge, near Glasgow, Scotland

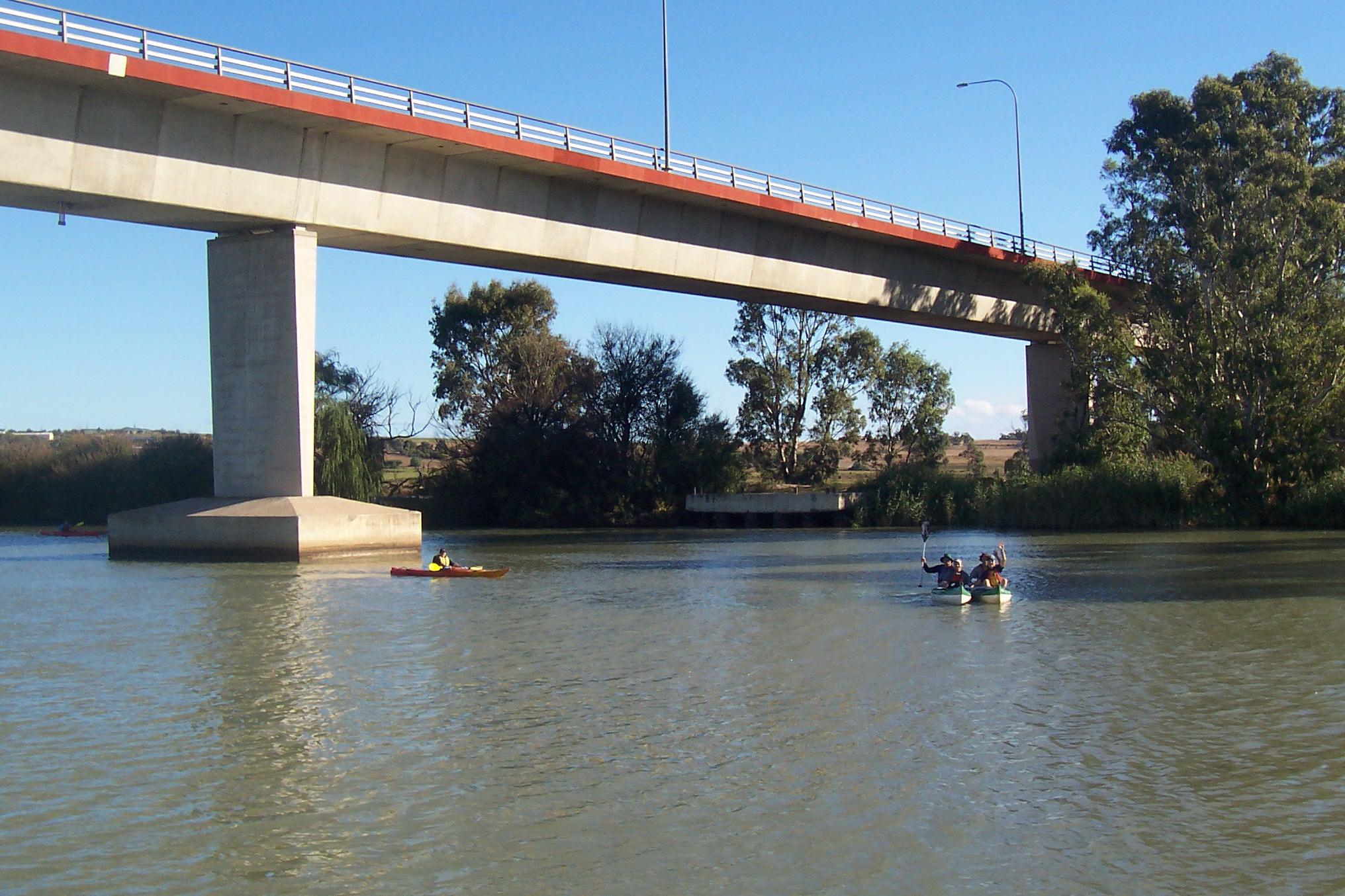
Single box girder bridge (concrete), Australia. A similar bridge on this river was fabricated ashore and pushed across its pylons.

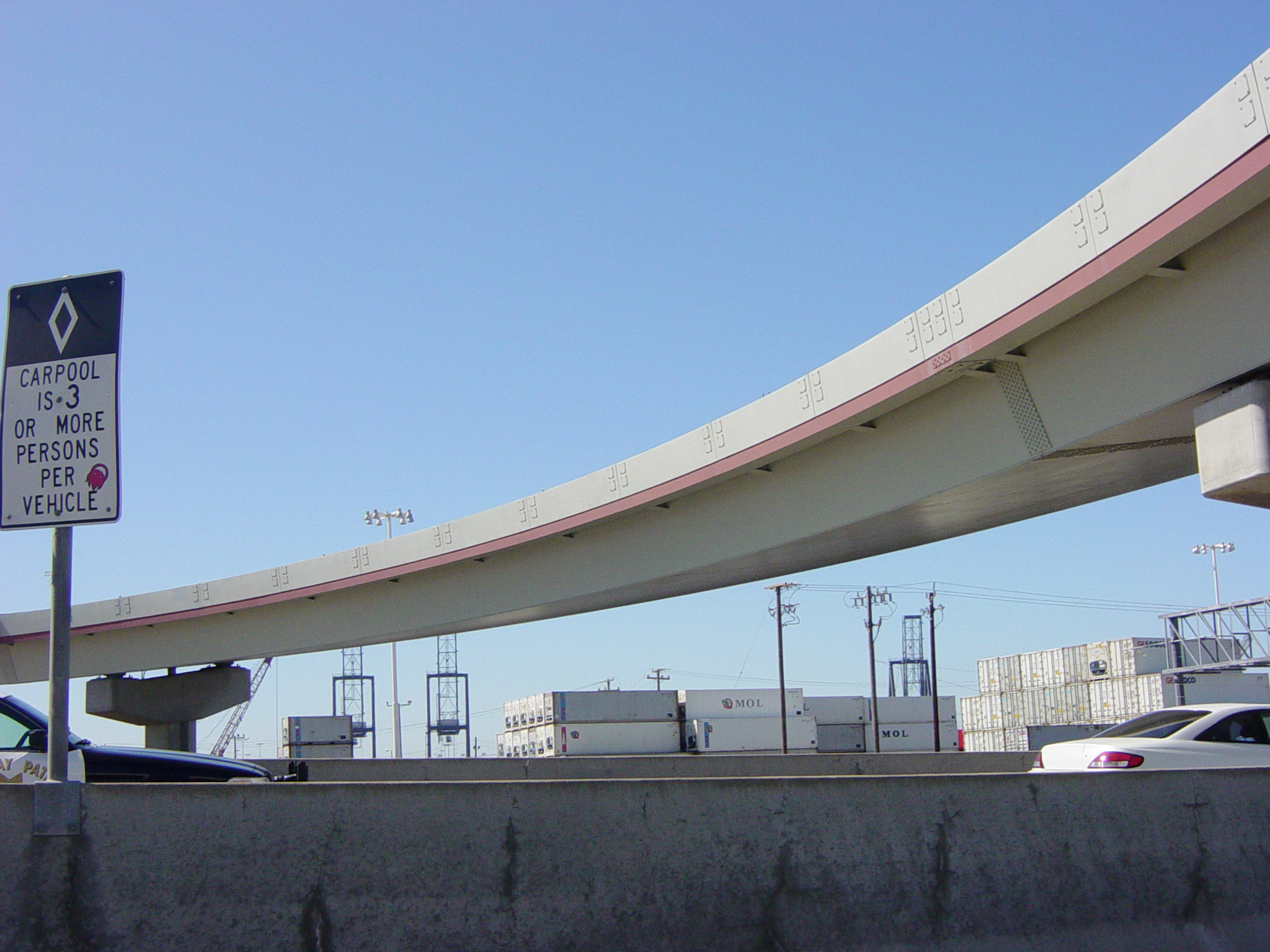
Single box girder bridge (steel), flyover above eastern approach of the San Francisco–Oakland Bay Bridge

A box girder bridge, or box section bridge, is a bridge in which the main beams comprise girders in the shape of a hollow box. The box girder normally comprises prestressed concrete, structural steel, or a composite of steel and reinforced concrete. The box is typically rectangular or trapezoidal in cross-section. Box girder bridges are commonly used for highway flyovers and for modern elevated structures of light rail transport. Although the box girder bridge is normally a form of beam bridge, box girders may also be used on cable-stayed and other bridges.

== Development of steel box girders ==
In 1919, Major Gifford Martel was appointed head of the Experimental Bridging Establishment at Christchurch, Hampshire, which researched the possibilities of using tanks for battlefield engineering purposes such as bridge-laying and mine-clearing. Here he continued trials on modified Mark V tanks. The bridging component involved an assault bridge, designed by Major Charles Inglis RE, the Canal Lock Bridge, which had sufficient length to span a canal lock. Major Martel mated the bridge with the tank and used hydraulic power generated by the tank's engine to manoeuvre the bridge into place. For mine clearance the tanks were equipped with two-ton rollers.

Martel also developed his new bridging concept at the EBE, the Martel bridge, a modular box girder bridge suitable for military applications. The Martel bridge was adopted by the British Army in 1925 as the Large Box Girder Bridge. A scaled down version of this design, the Small Box Girder Bridge, was also formally adopted by the Army in 1932. This latter design was copied by many countries, including Germany, who called their version the Kastenträger-Gerät (K-Gerät for short). The United States was another country whose army created their own copy, designating it the H-20. In addition, the modular construction of the basic Martel bridge would later during WWII become part of the basis of the Bailey bridge. In 1954, the Royal Commission on Awards to Inventors awarded Martel £500 for infringement on the design of his bridge by the designer of the Bailey bridge, Donald Bailey.

Both the Large Box and Small Box designs would go on to see much service in World War II, especially in the case of the latter.

The (non-modular) box girder bridge was a popular choice during the roadbuilding expansion of the 1960s, especially in the West, and many new bridge projects were in progress simultaneously. A serious blow to this use was a sequence of three serious disasters, when new bridges collapsed in 1970 (West Gate Bridge and Cleddau Bridge) and 1971 (South Bridge (Koblenz)). Fifty-one people were killed in these failures, leading in the UK to the formation of the Merrison Committee and considerable investment in new research into steel box girder behaviour.

Most of the bridges still under construction at this time were delayed for investigation of the basic design principle. Some were abandoned and rebuilt as a different form of bridge altogether. Most of those that remained as box girder bridges, such as Erskine Bridge (illus.), were either redesigned, or had additional stiffening added later. Some bridges were strengthened a few years after opening and then further strengthened years later, although this was often due to increased traffic load as much as better design standards. The Irwell Valley bridge of 1970 was strengthened in 1970 and again in 2000.

== Construction ==
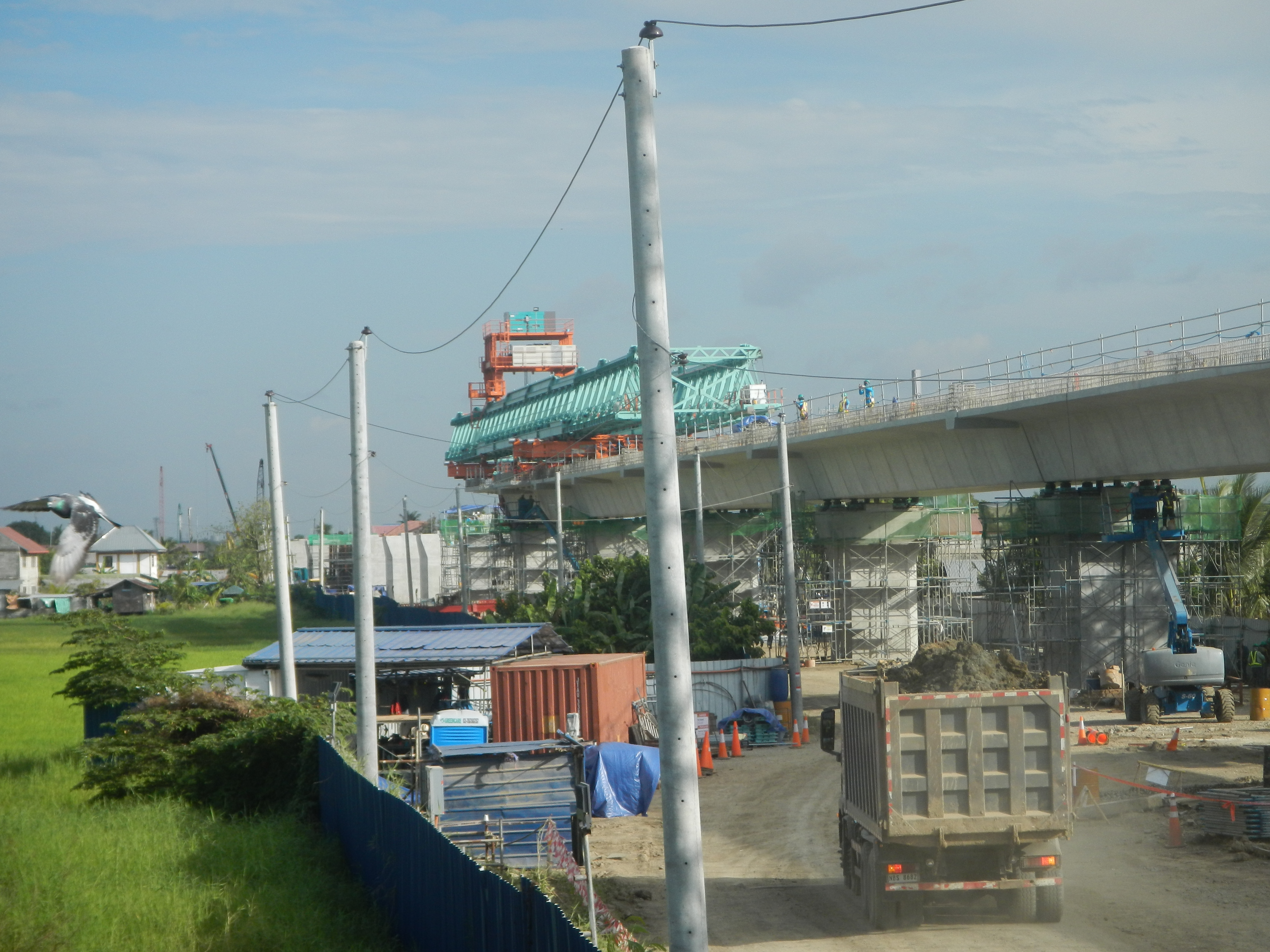
Construction of a box girder viaduct on the North–South Commuter Railway, Philippines

If made of concrete, box girder bridges may be cast in place using falsework supports, removed after completion, or in sections if a segmental bridge. Box girders may also be prefabricated in a fabrication yard, then transported and emplaced using cranes.

For steel box girders, the girders are normally fabricated off site and lifted into place by crane, with sections connected by bolting or welding. If a composite concrete bridge deck is used, it is often cast in-place using temporary falsework supported by the steel girder.

Either form of bridge may also be installed using the technique of incremental launching. Under this method, gantry cranes are often used to place new segments onto the completed portions of the bridge until the bridge superstructure is completed.

=== Advantages and disadvantages ===
==== Advantages ====
- Reduces the slab thickness and self-weight of bridge
- Cost effective
- Greater strength per unit area of concrete
- Quality assurance, as precast girders are made off-site

==== Disadvantages ====
(Mainly non-modular designs)

- Structural steel girders are costly
- Logistical inefficiencies and transportation cost
