= List of reportedly haunted locations in Thailand =

Thailand is a country located in Mainland Southeast Asia with a history of over 700 years. It is predominantly Buddhist (Theravāda Buddhism), but many people still believe in and respect superstition, the supernatural, miracles, magic, animism, amulets, and similar practices.

This is a list of locations in Thailand reported to be haunted or associated with paranormal activity.

== Bangkok metropolitan region ==
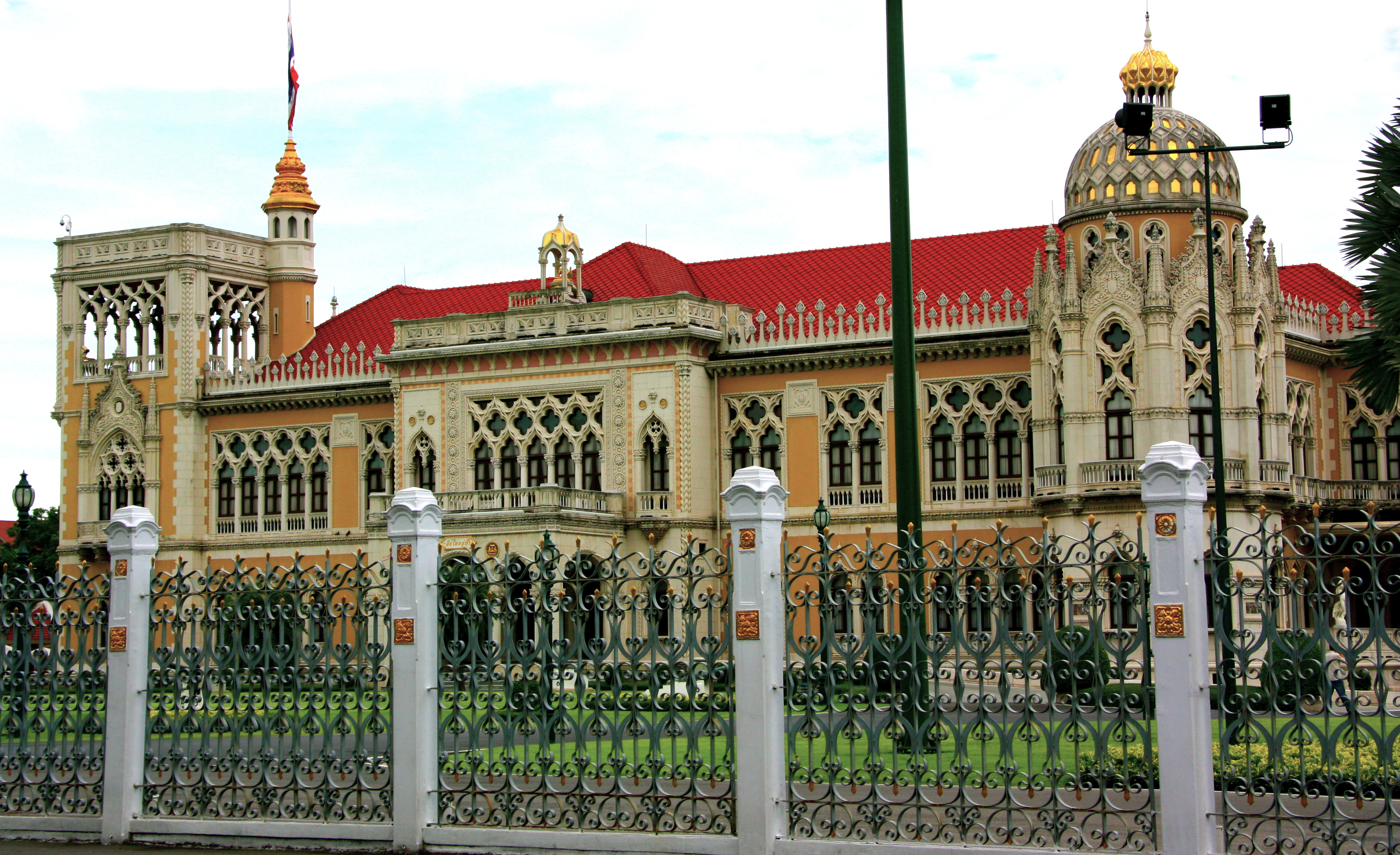
Government House of Thailand

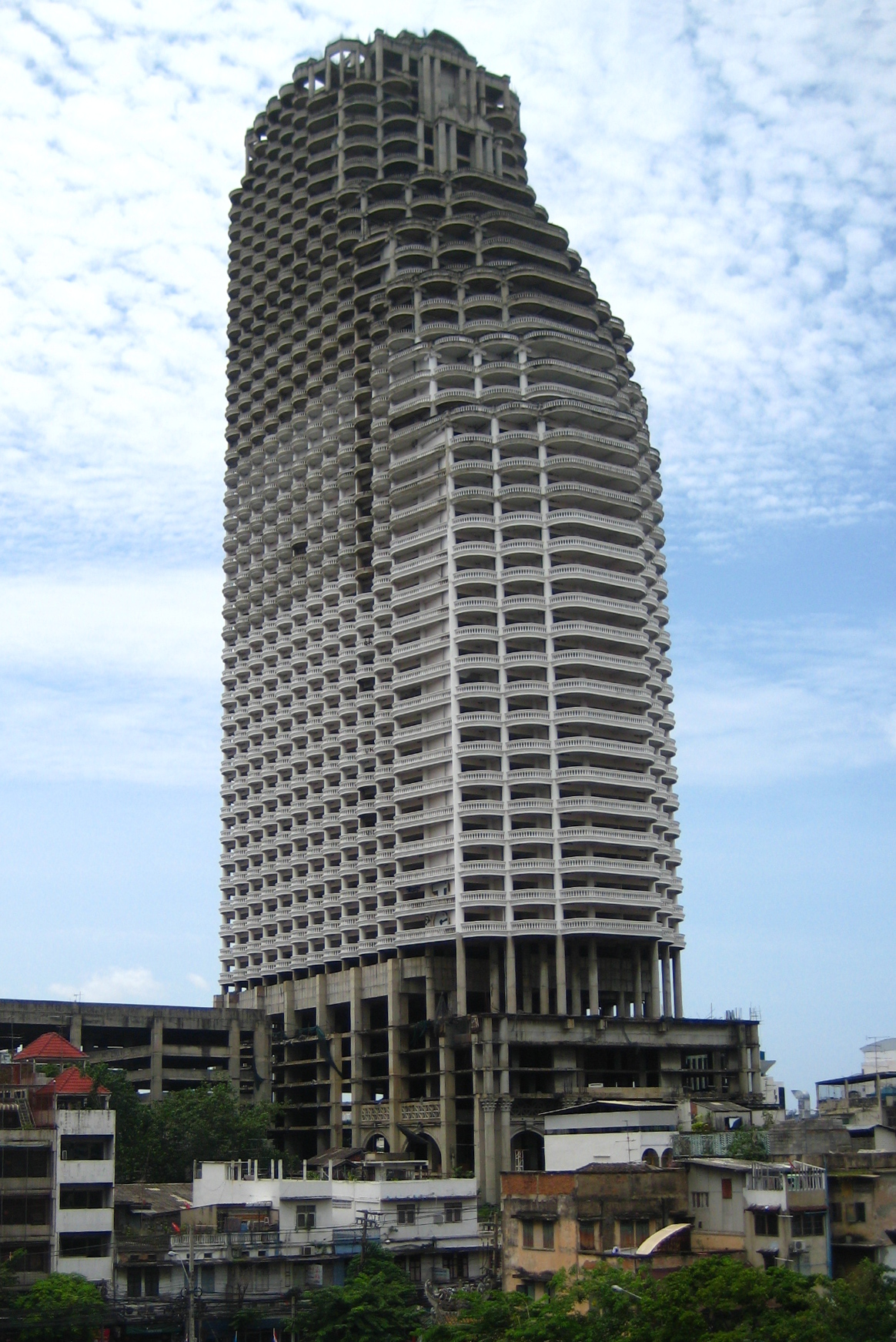
Sathorn Unique Tower

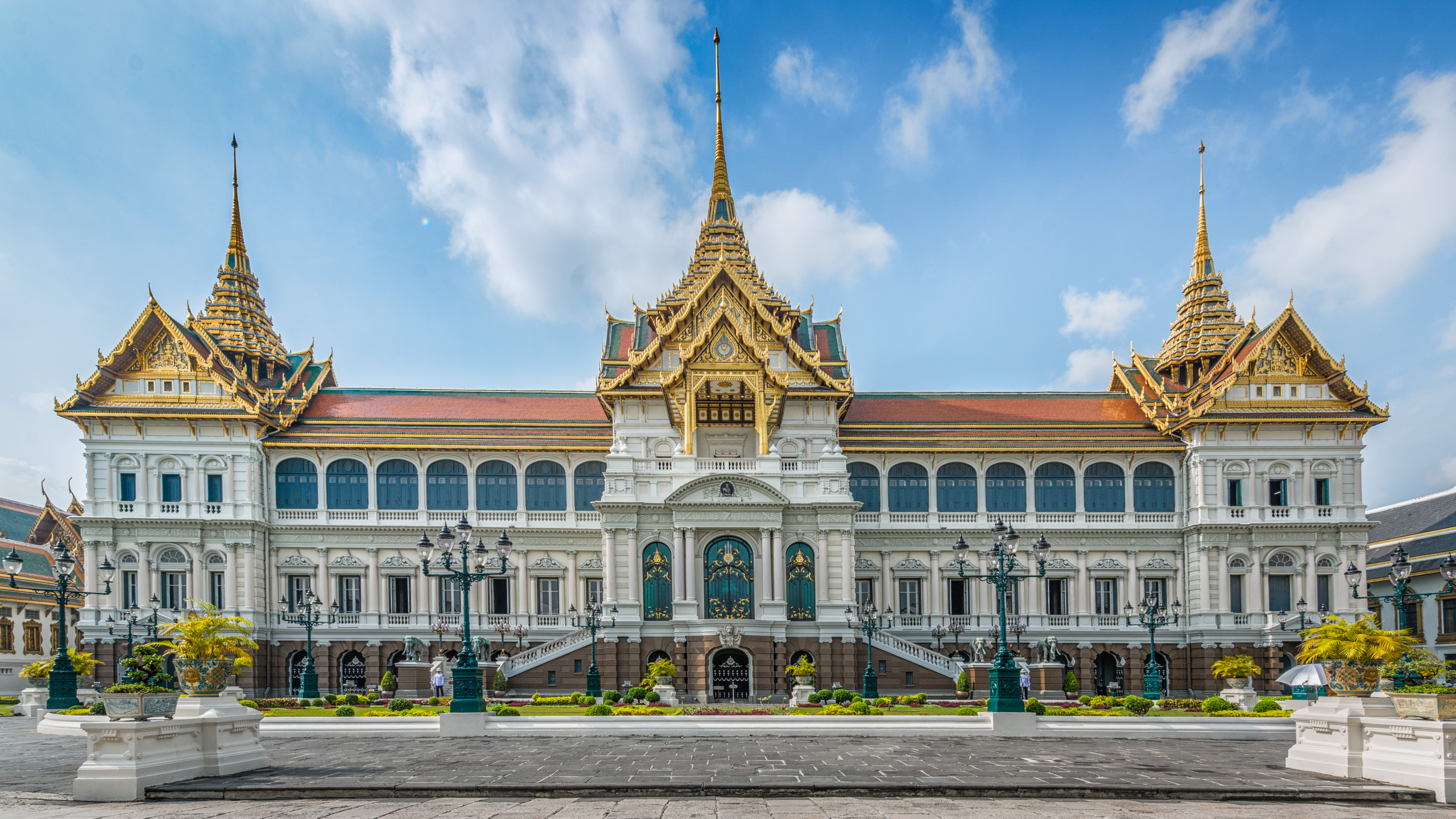
Chakri Maha Prasat Throne Hall inside the Grand Palace

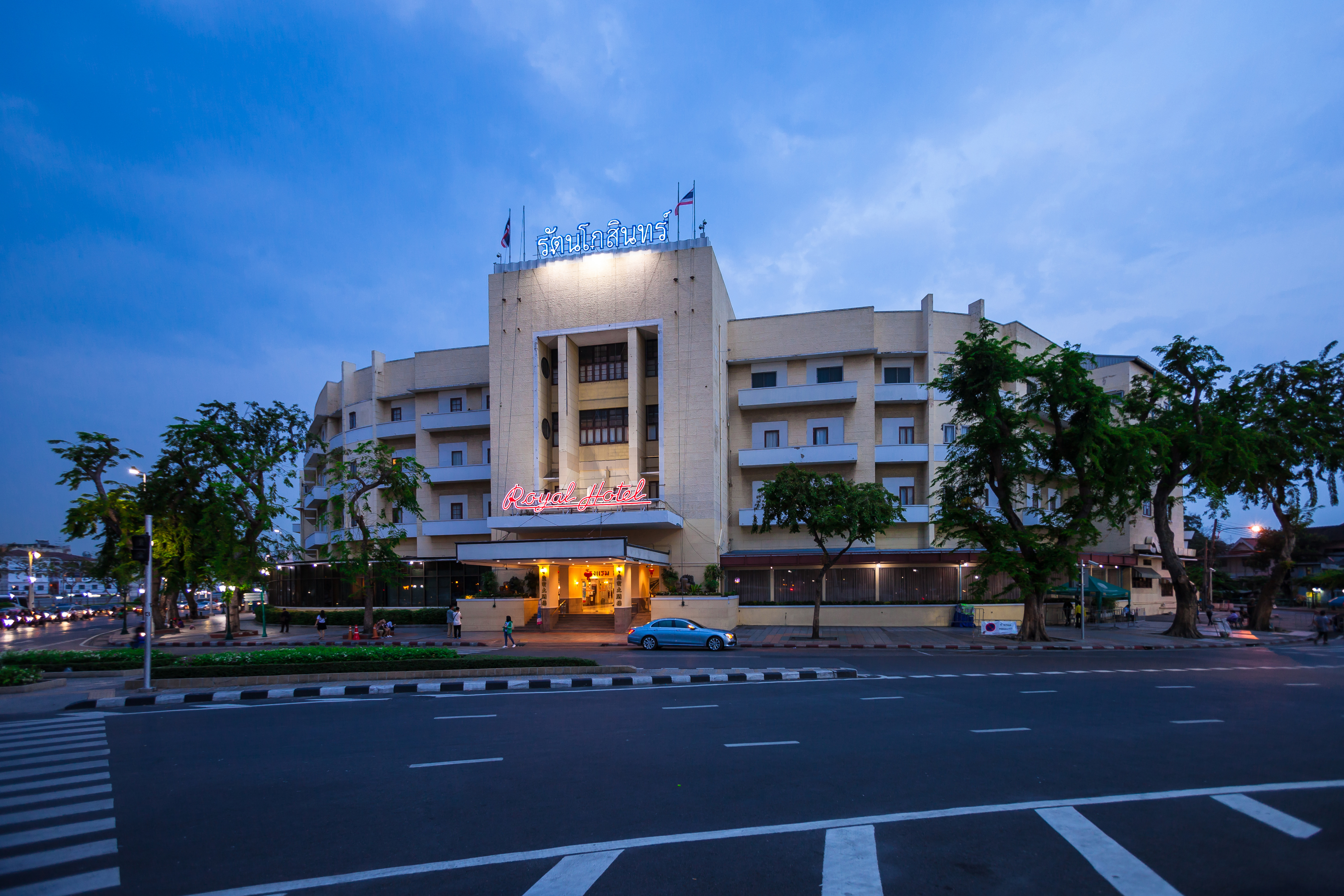
Royal Hotel at night

=== Rattanakosin Island & the surrounding areas ===
- Government House of Thailand: The office of the Cabinet of Thailand, rumored to be home to many ghosts and paranormal activities.
- Phitsanulok Mansion: The official residence of the Prime Minister of Thailand. Similar to the nearby Government House, the mansion is rumored to be haunted by numerous spirits.
- Abbhantripaja's Palace: The former palace of Princess Abbhantripaja, a daughter of King Rama V, was left abandoned after her death. At night, witnesses have reported hearing a woman crying, the sound of someone swimming, or lights flickering on and off by themselves. Today, the site serves as a café, a library, and part of the headquarters of the Chartthaipattana Party.
- Talapat Suksa School: The abandoned school building on Phraeng Nara in Bangkok's Phra Nakhon district. The school was named after Princess Srinagarindra, née Talapat, and was once the site of a theater established by Prince Narathip Praphanphong. Locals claim to have seen the ghost of an actress haunting the premises.
- Chakri Maha Prasat Throne Hall: One of the throne halls in the Grand Palace, once home to Thai monarchs and senior royals from the reign of King Rama I to Rama V, is rumored among palace insiders to be haunted by the spirit of King Rama III. He is said to appear as a fat, dark-skinned man dressed only in a red chang kben. It was said that Prince Chakrabongse saw him as a child while playing hide and seek with royal attendants.
- Democracy Monument: A roundabout at the junction of Ratchadamnoen Avenue and Dinso Road—home to the Democracy Monument and near Satriwittaya School, one of Thailand's leading girls' schools—was once rumored to be haunted. In the past, there were stories of a pedicab that picked up passengers at night and then mysteriously vanished. Today, across from the school, an over-100-year-old wooden house still remains.
- Royal Hotel, locally known as Rattanakosin Hotel: A historic hotel located at the corner of Sanam Luang and Ratchadamnoen Avenue. During the October 14, 1973 events, many protesters, mostly students, fled from the crackdown and were killed here. Guests often report encounters with spirits or ghosts. One Western man, whose wife is Thai, reportedly encountered a faceless ghost similar to a Noppera-bō.
- Wat Suthat: A temple built during the reign of King Rama I, this first-grade royal temple is a popular tourist attraction. There is a local legend about a tall hungry ghost called Preta. However, this figure might actually have been the Giant Swing in front of the temple, with the morning fog contributing to the sighting.

=== Outside Rattanakosin Island ===
- Crime Suppression Division Jail Cell: Many prisoners claim to have seen a male ghost wearing a red t-shirt in the jail cell, especially on their first night. It is said that this ghost persuades others to hang themselves.
- Lumphini Park: A 360-rai (57.6 hectares or 142 acres) park is said to contain a haunted wooden house. At night, people often hear a shrill cry coming from inside the park. During the People's Democratic Reform Committee (PDRC) rallies, while protesters stayed in the park, some demonstrators reported experiencing hauntings, and a volunteer security guard was possessed at dawn.
- Ratchaprasong Intersection: A road intersection in Pathum Wan district, downtown Bangkok, it is both a popular tourist destination and a world-class shopping center. The area is rumored to be cursed or haunted, as it was once the site of Prince Chudadhuj Dharadilok's palace. Today, it is home to eight Hindu shrines, including the famous Erawan Shrine.
- Soi Watcharapol: A soi (side-road branching off a major road) in Bang Khen district, known as a secluded area with several reportedly haunted houses.
- Soi Ramkhamhaeng 32: Ramkhamhaeng 32 Alley near Ramkhamhaeng University in Bang Kapi district, was once home to an abandoned house rumored to be haunted by the spirit of a female maid who had been murdered there. In the 1990s, it became a popular spot for teenagers interested in ghost hunting. The house was demolished around 2008.
- Wat Maha But: Buddhist temple in Suan Luang district. Location established the Mae Nak Phra Khanong shrine that is home to a famous Thai ghost legend.
- Wat Samian Nari: A temple in Chatuchak district is known for many urban legends about two women dressed in black who appear here at night. They are said to call taxis from Ratchadapisek Road to the temple, but mysteriously disappear before reaching their destination. These women are believed to be sisters named "Chulee Thipsuksri" and "Sulee Thipsuksri", who died after being struck by a train that split their bodies. The last sighting occurred late at night on August 11, 2024. It was a taxi driver who said he picked up two women in black from near the temple to Soi Ratchadaphisek 18. When they were close, the pair disappeared from the back seat without a trace.
- Wat Don Cemetery: A cemetery of Wat Don Kuson in Sathon district. That was rumored to be haunted.
- Sa Pathum Palace: A royal residence near Ratchaprasong Intersection, once home to Queen Savang Vadhana, is now the official residence of Princess Sirindhorn. The place is said to be haunted by the queen's spirit. A palace worker once saw an elderly woman in a green dress and gold shoes while fishing—later recognizing her from a portrait of the queen. Princess Sirindhorn also shared a strange experience: she saw a woman dressed like her portrait step out of the painting and return. Frightened, she fled and began to pray, unsure whether it was a dream or something supernatural.
- Wat Suwannaram: This temple, built during the Ayutthaya period, is located in Bangkok Noi district, Thonburi—the capital during King Taksin's reign. It was once used for executing prisoners of war, mainly Burmese soldiers. Recently, locals have reported sightings of Burmese ghosts haunting the area. Rumors mention a Preta on the bell tower, a headless male ghost wearing a chang kben, and a female ghost appearing at the pier at midnight.
- Ratchadaphisek Road: A major road in Chatuchak district, featuring a curve opposite the Criminal Court where a large banyan tree and spirit house stand. This spot is notorious for frequent car accidents and is known as the "Curve of Hundred Corpses".
- Sathorn Unique Tower: An unfinished skyscraper in downtown Bangkok, situated by the Chao Phraya river, left incomplete due to the 1997 financial crisis. It is notable for its numerous ghost stories and inspired the 2017 horror film The Promise.
- Thawi Watthana Deserted House: A deserted house in Thawi Watthana district, suburban Bangkok. In 2015, seven teenagers went ghost hunting there. Over time, all but two died in accidents such as motorcycle crashes and a house fire. Witnesses at each incident reported seeing a mysterious woman with long hair wearing a white dress. A psychic claimed the spirit, known as "Dao" or "Deuan", was vengeful and responsible for the deaths.
- Bang Khae Shopping Mall: A shopping mall in the Bang Khae area of Thonburi has long been rumored to be haunted and is known as a common site for suicides. In November 2023, a young woman reported seeing a man walking by disappear into a pole in the mall's parking lot as she was about to park her car around 4:00 pm. Although the mall's name was not disclosed, it is believed to be either Seacon Bangkae or The Mall Bangkhae.
- Haunted House: A two-storey house located in Soi Ram Intra 65 Yaek 2-18 is rumored to be haunted, as nine people have died there over the past ten years. The most recent incident involved a delivery rider who, driven by jealousy, killed his wife before hanging himself. Although neighbors tried to ward off bad luck by adding the number 5 to the end of the house number, their efforts were unsuccessful.
- King Mongkut's Institute of Technology Ladkrabang: One of the leading universities in eastern Bangkok, the institute is known for a ghost story associated with the women's restroom on the fifth floor of Building A, Faculty of Engineering. It is said that a small wooden shrine was once installed inside the restroom, dedicated to the spirit of a female student who took her own life there after being heartbroken by her boyfriend, who also studied at the university. Over time, numerous eerie incidents have been reported. Many claim that strange noises can often be heard around the fifth floor, or that shadowy figures are seen walking by—only for no one to be there upon closer inspection. Some have even reported seeing a traditional Thai dancer emerging from the shrine. Others say that when using the restroom late at night, it feels as if someone is occupying the next stall, or that if one looks into the mirror, the reflection of the deceased woman appears standing behind them. The shrine has since been relocated to the area behind the Faculty of Engineering, Building A, where it now stands as a larger and more elaborate structure.
- Mahidol University: One of Thailand's leading universities, located in Tambon Salaya, Amphoe Phutthamonthon, Nakhon Pathom province, was formerly a funeral home during the reigns of King Rama IV and King Rama V. The campus now hosts many shrines, and there have been numerous reports of students believed to be possessed or haunted.
- Thai Lemon Foods Factory: A lemon juice factory located in Tambon Nong Sam Wang, Amphoe Nong Suea, Pathum Thani province, had its CCTV capture a luminous floating female spirit known as a Krasue on the night of July 22, 2008, at around 11:30 p.m. Locals insist it resembles an old woman who lives alone in the neighbourhood.
- Wat Prasat: A temple in Tambon Bang Krang, Nonthaburi province, dating back to the reign of King Prasat Thong during the medieval Ayutthaya period. Local leaders confirm that the site is haunted. The temple grounds contain many ancient relics, including the remains of a large Ta-khian tree over 40 meters long, believed to be inhabited by a spirit known as Nang Takian.

== Central ==
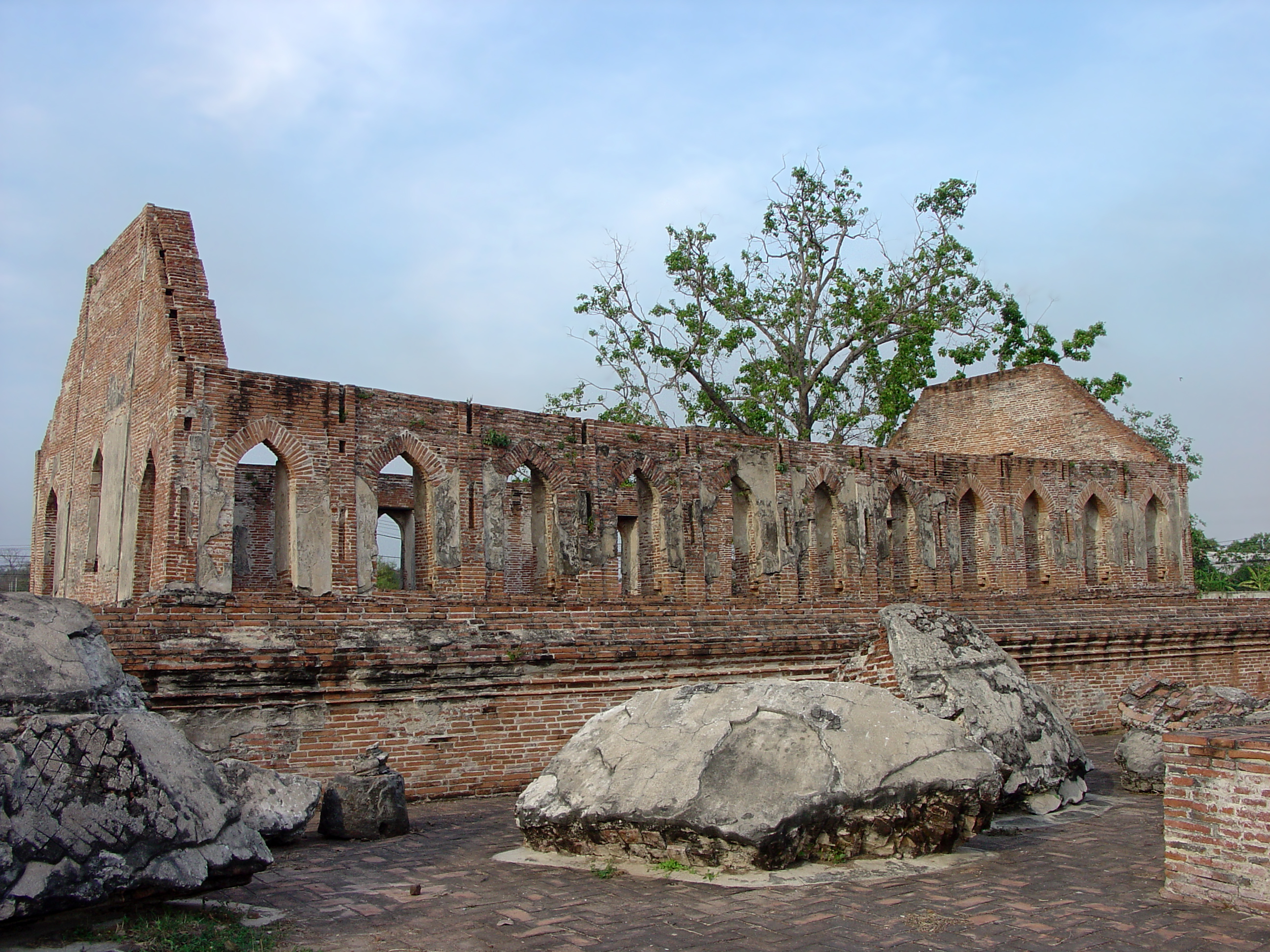
Wat Kudi Dao, Ayutthaya

- Ayutthaya Historical Park: The ancient capital of Thailand's history for over 400 years, from the 14th to the 18th century, is surrounded by many rumors about cursed treasures guarded by ghosts known as Pu Som Fao Sap. Today, numerous abandoned sites are believed to be the sources of these stories, including Wat Phra Sri Sanphet, Wat Kra Sai, Tri Muk Pavilion, Wat Ratchaburana, Wat Kudi Dao, and others. At Wat Kudi Dao, Prince Birabongse Bhanudej reportedly saw Pu Som Fao Sap in the form of a headless male ghost in December 1960. The prince, who had previously been a firm disbeliever in ghosts, said that this encounter changed his beliefs completely and made him a lifelong believer.
- Old Wooden House Silpakorn University: Silpakorn University, Thap Kaew Campus, is located in Amphoe Mueang, Nakhon Pathom province, Silpakorn University's Thap Kaew Campus was built over the grounds of a former royal residence, Sanam Chandra Palace. As a result, the area is said to be filled with numerous ghost stories. One of the most famous tales is that of the Ruean Nang Sanom (consorts' house), a raised traditional wooden building situated behind the Faculty of Science. It is said that late at night, students riding their bicycles past the building often catch sight of a Thai-dressed dancer gracefully performing by the window. At other times, cyclists suddenly feel their bicycles grow heavier, as if someone had quietly hopped on the back. Locals believe it is the spirit of that very dancer.
- Sermon Hall of Wat Ban Kae: The sermon hall of Wat Ban Kae in Amphoe Sawaeng Ha, Ang Thong province, was constructed in 1969 but remains unfinished due to hauntings experienced by the builders, monks, and villagers. It is currently abandoned.
- Wat Khao Kaeo: Located in Tambon Ongkharak, Amphoe Pho Thong, Ang Thong province. In early August 2012, a nun reportedly saw a Preta at the temple while praying. The villagers, including local police, have confirmed sightings of the spirit for many years.
- Ang Thong Antique Bed: An antique wooden bed over 100 years old, located at Wat Thanon, Tambon Phong Pheng, Amphoe Pa Mok, Ang Thong province. Its ownership is unknown, but those who sleep or sit on it reportedly experience many inexplicable phenomena, sometimes leading to death.
- Ang Thong Huanted Road: A large Bodhi tree growing in the middle of the road at Wat Chaeng Buddhist site, Amphoe Chaiyo, Ang Thong province, is rumored to be haunted. Occasionally, people have reported seeing a young boy with a traditional topknot hairstyle, dressed like a Kuman Thong, running and playing around. Authorities have attempted to remove the pavilion and the tree, but have been unsuccessful. As a result, many people come to ask for luck, while drivers tend to avoid passing by, especially at night.
- Kaeng Krachan National Park: The largest national park in Thailand, located in Phetchaburi province, lies along the border with Myanmar and is contiguous with the Tanintharyi Nature Reserve. In mid-2011, three Royal Thai Army helicopters crashed within just nine days, resulting in 17 fatalities. An ethnic Karen group believes this area to be inauspicious according to Feng Shui principles, likening it to the Bermuda Triangle.
- Khuean Srinagarindra National Park: The national park extends to Srinagarind Dam in Kanchanaburi province. On January 2, 2024, during the New Year holiday, a young man rode a motorbike alone from Bangkok on a day trip. On his way back at dusk, he saw a woman wearing a white shirt and green skirt standing alone behind a barrier on a curved stretch of road surrounded by trees. Startled, he screamed and believed she might be a tutelary spirit. Both sides of the road were formerly lined with spirit houses.
- Bongsanodbiang: A waterfall and stream located in the forest of Amphoe Sangkhla Buri, Kanchanaburi province. Originally, it was a Karen village called Lo Thueng. Later, a large number of deaths occurred here after toxic lead was released into the water sources from mining activities. During World War II, Japanese soldiers captured the villagers and forced them into labor to build the Death Railway. Those who attempted to escape were hunted down and killed in this very place. Since then, it has gained a reputation as a haunted site. Anyone who enters is said to be tormented by ghosts. Its name, in the Karen language, means "the gathering place of spirits." The story has become widely known and frequently retold across the online world.
- Abandoned Temple in the Sukhothai Forest: An abandoned temple that has been deserted for over 34 years, located atop Chok Chanang Hill, behind Sreedapong Dam, Amphoe Mueang Sukhothai, Sukhothai province. It is notorious for being haunted by a variety of spirits, including Pretas, Suea Samings (a half-human, half-tiger entity comparable to a Skin-walker or Werecat), Phi Tai Thang Kloms (ghosts of pregnant women who died), and tall ancient human-like apparitions that frequently disturb monks who come to meditate in tents. Some visitors say they cannot stay there at all, and there are even reports of hands emerging from the ground.

== Eastern ==
- Mathayom Taksin Rayong School: High school in Rayong City, Amphoe Mueang Rayong, Rayong province. Many students and janitors claim this school is haunted. This place used to be a prison in the past.
- Mae Ram Phueng Beach: The beach is a famous tourist attraction of Rayong province. However, many drownings led it to be called "Haunted Beach" or "Man-eating Beach". Those who visit or stay here often experience hauntings.
- Krasae Bon Cave: A cave located in the rainforest of Tambon Krasae Bon, Amphoe Klaeng, Rayong province, approximately 500 meters from the nearest village. Locals often report hearing traditional Thai music coming from inside the cave and seeing strange lights floating around its entrance.
- Ko Kham Noi: A small island near Ko Sichang in Chonburi province, located in the Gulf of Thailand, serves as a graveyard for many nationalities and religions. In the past, locals referred to it as "Ghost Island" due to its reputation as a highly haunted place. On one occasion, a group of teenagers came to hunt for ghosts and reported hearing mysterious sounds as well as seeing the apparition of a Muslim ghost.
- Saphan Bang Pakong: A bridge crossing the Bang Pakong River in Amphoe Bang Pakong, Chachoengsao province, is known for sightings of a mysterious woman in red—a young woman no older than 30—who reportedly beckons people to jump into the river with her. According to a local police officer stationed there since 1992, more than 60 people have committed suicide by jumping into the river at this spot since then.
- Haunted Room: A rented room in Tambon Choeng Noen, Amphoe Mueang Rayong, Rayong province, has been linked to four deaths. The most recent victim was a local DJ, aged 77. Before he died, he wrote in a diary and left a note on the wall saying, "This room is full of ghosts; they bother me every day." Mo Pla, a well-known exorcist, described his experience at the site as "truly intense".
- Talat Nong Tamleung Intersection: A four-way intersection in Tambon Nong Tamleung, Amphoe Phan Thong, Chonburi province, near Wat Nong Tamlueng, was the site of a fatal accident around 1965 involving a worker's truck and a diesel dump truck, resulting in 10 deaths. Just a few days later, another car accident occurred at the same location, killing two more people. The owner of a kopi tiam (traditional coffee shop) operating nearby, along with many locals, reported hearing screams for help at night. During the day, some farmers heard similar noises while taking lunch breaks, and there were occasional foul odors reminiscent of decaying corpses. Over time, the kopi tiam experienced a significant decline in business and eventually closed, believed to be due to the unrest of the deceased spirits. Today, the intersection no longer exists, and the kopi tiam has long since ceased operation.

== Northern ==
- Chiang Mai University: The first public research university in northern Thailand, founded in 1964, is steeped in ghost stories. One of the most well-known involves the seventh women's dormitory, where students have reported hearing a chilling nighttime sound "Pok... Pok... Crued". According to local legend, it is the sound of a student dragging herself up the stairs after being fatally assaulted. This tale was later adapted into one segment of the horror anthology film Haunted Universities (2009), produced by Sahamongkol Film International. As of 2026, the franchise has expanded to four installments. Among all locations featured, Chiang Mai University has appeared most frequently in this cinematic universe, with as many as 14 segments set there.
- Mae Usu Cave: The largest cave in Mae Moei National Park, Tak province. According to the beliefs of the indigenous S'gaw people, the cave is home to a malevolent spirit Suea Saming. It is said that during a full moon, the creature attempts to lure unsuspecting individuals into the cave by playing traditional Thai music.
- Field of Ban Thung Hee: A field in Ban Thung Hee, Tambon Wang Sai Kham, Amphoe Wang Nuea, Lampang province. On December 9, 2017, a local villager discovered unusually large human-like footprints—about 30 cm in length and spaced up to 170 cm apart. Locals believe these belong to a tutelary spirit known as Phra Chao Noke.

• Building three, Kamphaeng phet pittayakom school : A building in the Kamphaeng phet pittayakom school. It is the third main building and its second floor is still wooden. There is a post on Pantip that says that a girl forgot something in a room on the second floor. It was already rate so she went there with her mother and told her mother to wait downstairs. She did not come back for a long time so her mother and the guards searched the building repeatedly, however, she was not found. The next day, someone found the girl lying in the room and woke her up, but she could not remember what happened last night. (Note : Waiting for an editor to fix the Northeastern region.)

Northeastern (Isan region)

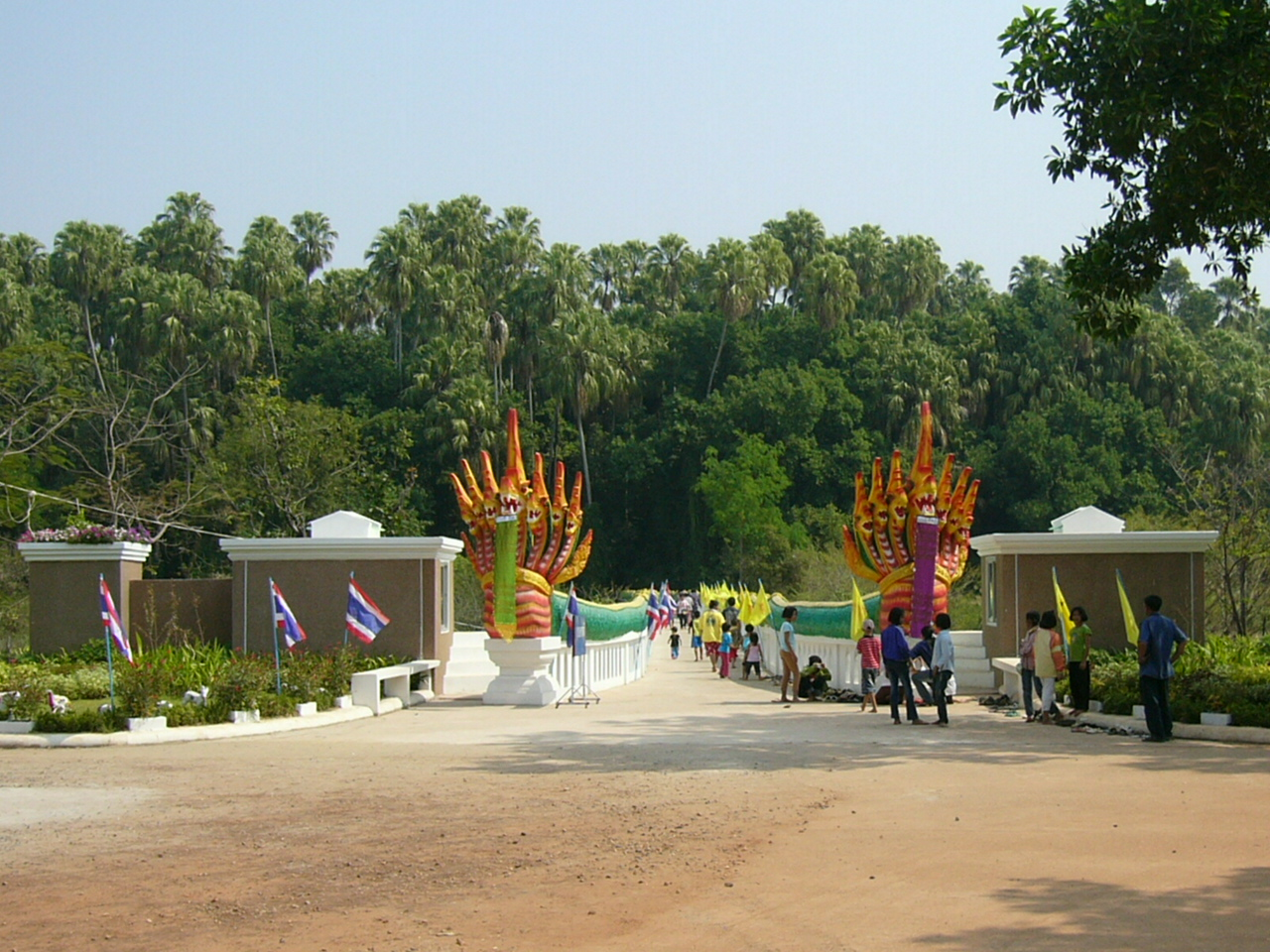
Entrance to Kamchanod Forest

- Kamchanod Forest: Located on a secluded island surrounded by narrow waterways near Tambon Wang Tong, Amphoe Ban Dung, Udon Thani province, this dense and ancient forest is considered both a sacred site and a gateway to the underground kingdom of the Phaya Nāga. Long shrouded in mystery and fear, it is the setting of countless ghost stories whispered across generations. In the early 1989, a traveling cinema troupe was reportedly hired to screen movies at the site. The troupe assumed the audience would be local villagers, as the screening was held in a clearing and appeared to draw a large crowd. However, to their shock, the next morning they were told that no one from the village had gone to the screening that night. It was then they realized they might have unknowingly shown movies to spirits.
- Submafai Forest: A forestland in Thap Lan National Park became the subject of local mystery in mid-September 2017, when a 73-year-old woman went missing while foraging for mushrooms. She later claimed that a woman in green traditional Thai attire led her to a house deep within the forest. While her relatives searched for her over two days, she described being well cared for. Despite the humid, damp conditions of the forest, her clothes and body were found remarkably clean and dry—something that left many puzzled.
- Tamle Forest: In early September 2017, a young man went missing for five days in this forest in Amphoe Chum Phuang, Nakhon Ratchasima province. He later claimed that a mysterious woman dressed in green traditional Thai costume guided him out. Locals believe the forest to be haunted.
- Phanom Rung Historical Park: A Khmer rock temple complex situated on the rim of an extinct volcano in Buriram province, founded in the 10th century and dedicated to Shiva, one of the supreme Hindu gods. At night, visitors have reported encounters with the tall, malevolent hungry ghost known as Preta.
- Din Piang Cave: A cave on Phu Bo Bid, Tambon Kut Pong, Amphoe Mueang Loei, Loei province. In late September 2016, a strange three-toed footprint was discovered. Locals believe it to be the footprint of Phi Kong Koi, a hairy, one-legged forest vampire that resembles a small boy.
- Sai Taku: A small subdistrict in Buriram province bordering Cambodia, there is a village where, after nightfall, residents rarely leave their homes. This is due not only to the unrest along the border that occurred in 2025–2026, but also to long-standing fears of Khmer spirits that have been passed down through local lore. An elderly woman recounted that in 1976, during the Communist insurgency period, a pregnant Khmer woman was killed there. Around 1980, after the conflict had subsided, her spirit was said to have begun wandering and causing disturbances, becoming widely known in the area. She told of an incident from her youth. One evening, while riding her bicycle to an outdoor movie screening, she encountered the spirit standing in the middle of the road, blocking her path. The apparition asked in Khmer, "Where are you going ?" Realizing it was not a human being, she replied dismissively, "I’m going to watch a movie. Move aside." At that moment, the spirit revealed itself in a terrifying manner. Besides this pregnant female ghost, there are said to be other spirits in the area as well. A local medium devoted to Shiva claims that Khmer spirits are particularly restless and often disturb both villagers and soldiers from time to time, as they died far from home and their souls are unable to return.
- Phu Kradueng National Park: Popular natural tourist attraction in Loei province, Phu Kradueng is known for its stunning beauty and numerous viewpoints. Among tourists, there are persistent rumors that many have encountered ghosts here. One common tale is that when trekking in groups, people are warned not to count their number, as the group size mysteriously changes—sometimes increasing unexpectedly. The most famous story is about a group of private university students who went trekking at Phu Kradueng. One of the students fainted in the jungle and was found lying and shaking on the ground while trekking. After he regained consciousness and was helped up by a ranger, he told his friends that he saw a giant figure making him fall and standing on his chest. When he returned home, he retold his misadventure to his sister. One day, his sister heard someone whisper that the student had to apologise to him. They promptly went to the temple to make an offering and sprinkled holy water to ward off any residual effects of the encounter. This matter was widely known from an interview with this group of students on the popular TV program At Ten on Channel 3 in mid-2004.
- Khon Kaen University: The first higher education institution in Thailand's northeastern region, founded in 1962. One of its most well-known ghost stories centers around the "White Bridge," a white concrete bridge located within the campus. It is said that during the Cold War, the area was once the site of clashes between government forces and communist insurgents. Many communists were killed, and mass graves were formed. Later, a fortune teller reportedly advised that a bridge be built over the area so that people would no longer walk directly over the burial grounds. Numerous eerie tales have since been told. For instance, students riding motorcycles across the bridge late at night have reported hearing the mournful strains of Thorani Kansen (ธรณีกรรแสง; lit. 'lamenting earth', a traditional Thai requiem) while their engines suddenly stall. After getting off and walking a short distance, some have claimed to see a man with no arms, or a woman carrying her own severed head. In another story, a couple was riding a motorcycle across the bridge, with the woman driving and her boyfriend riding pillion behind her, unaware that he had already died, his head severed by a sharp wire strung across the bridge, originally set up to deter thieves or communist insurgents.

== Southern ==
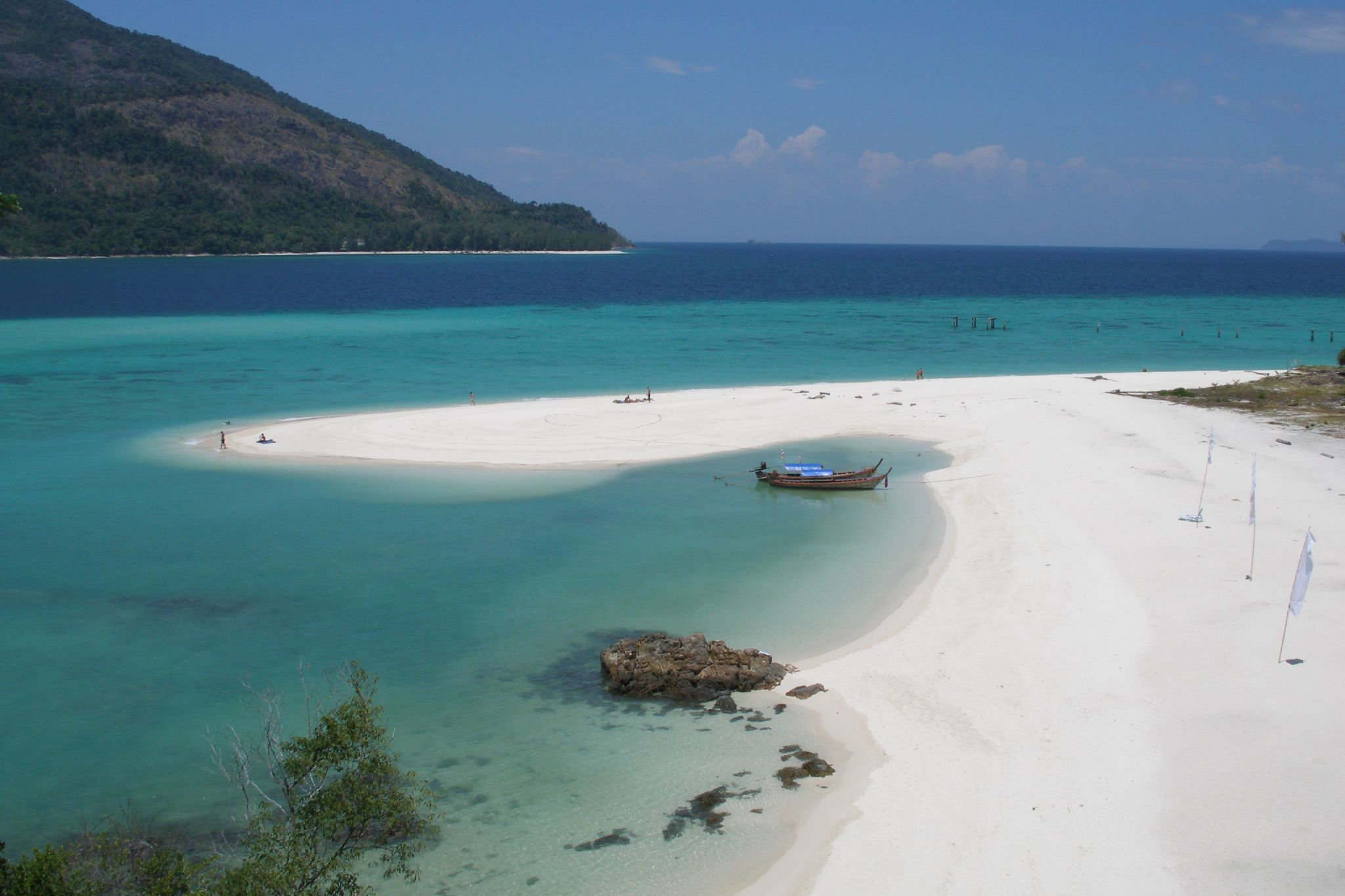
Lipe Island

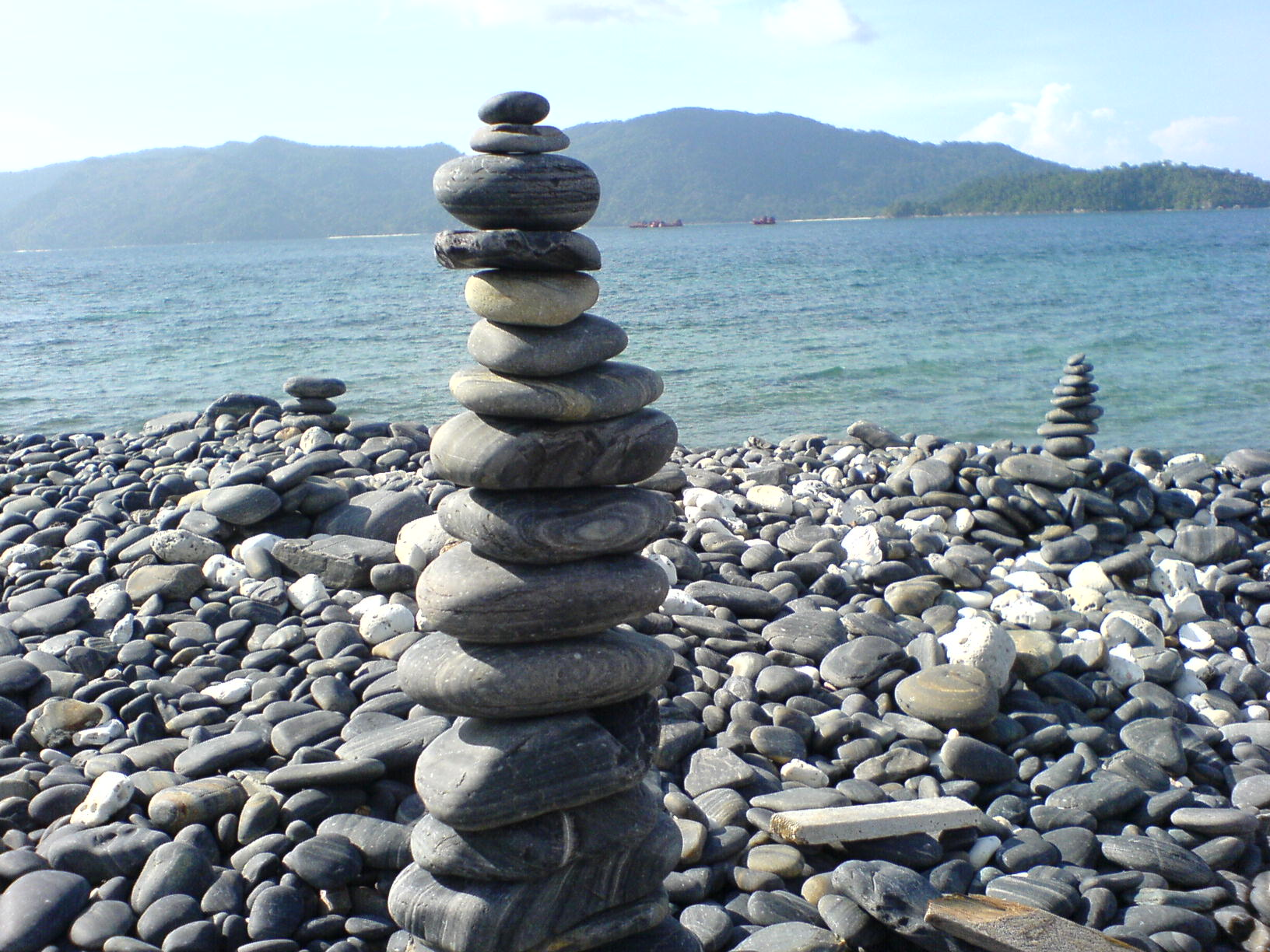
Ko Hin Ngam

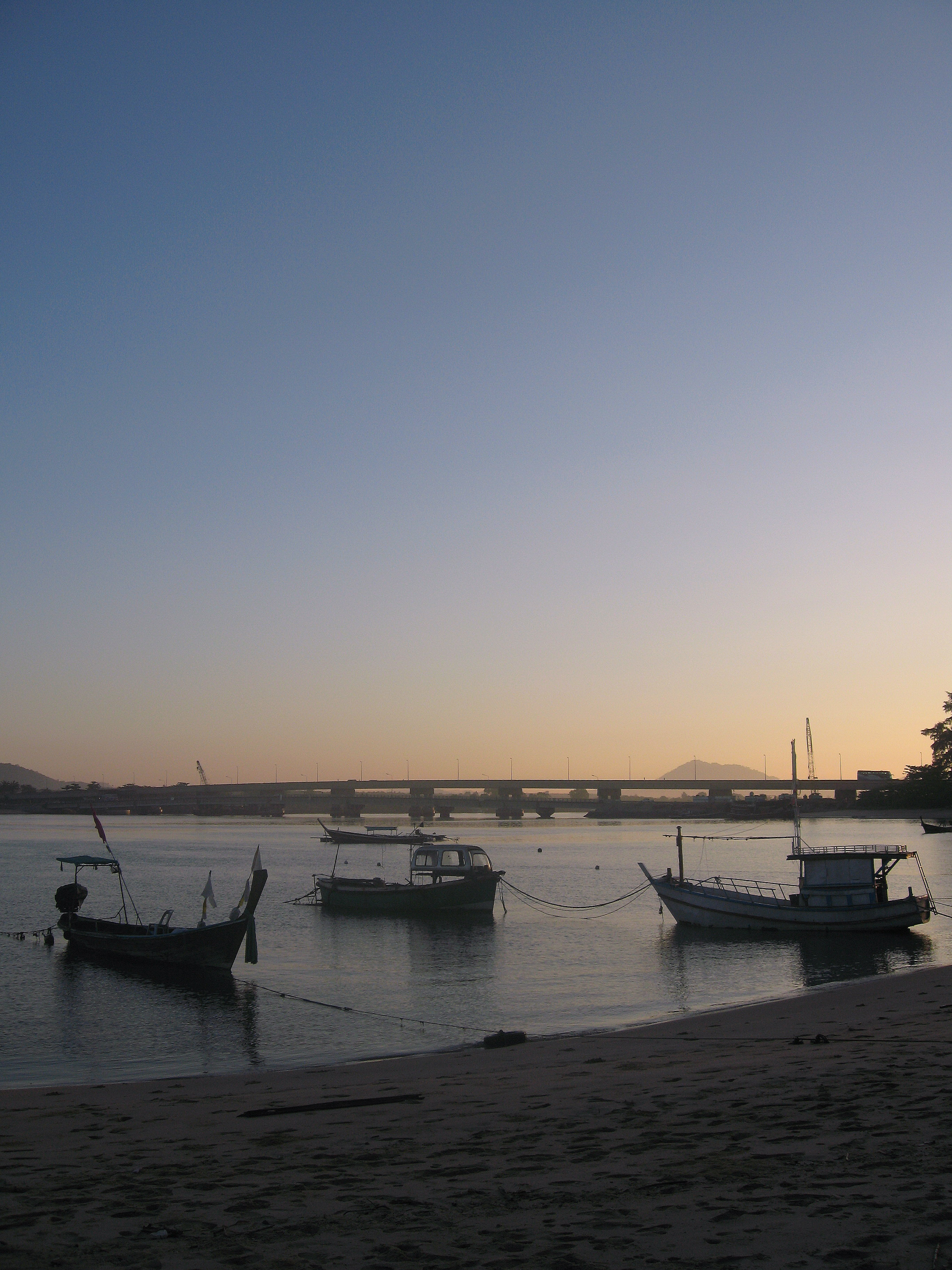
Fishing boats in Phuket, Sarasin Bridge in the distance

- Lipe Island: Located in the Andaman Sea, Lipe is inhabited by the Chao-Le, an ethnic group nicknamed the "Gypsies of the Andaman Sea". The Chao-Le have animist beliefs and say their island is full of rowdy spirits which they call ha-too. Tourists also claim feeling the presence of invisible forces during their stays there. Residents are said to be able to appease these spirits with offerings of cupcakes and cold strawberry soft drinks.
- Ko Hin Ngam: A small island among the 51 islands of Tarutao National Park, located about 5.5 km (3.4 mi) from Lipe Island. Its beach is covered with uniquely shaped black stones that display beautiful patterns and shine with a lustrous glow when touched by water—a natural phenomenon found only in this part of Thailand. The island is shrouded in legend, centered on the curse of Chaopho Tarutao, a revered tutelary spirit. It is said that anyone who removes these stones from the island will suffer various misfortunes, making it impossible for them to live a normal life. The only way to lift the curse is to return the stones. Park officials report that many packages of stones are returned each year, some even sent from abroad. A shrine dedicated to Chaopho Tarutao was built on the island in 1981. According to local lore, a powerful southern billionaire once took numerous stones to decorate his home but soon was shot dead in the middle of a marketplace.
- Wang Song Phi Nong Forest: A forest in Tambon Phichit, Amphoe Na Mom, Songkhla province. In August 2017, a 38-year-old man went missing in this forest for seven days. He later said he saw people searching for him, but when he called out, no one seemed to hear. A medium claimed that he had been veiled from the human world by supernatural forces, believed to be the spirit of his wife from a previous life.
- Sarasin Bridge: In 1973, a young couple in a forbidden relationship ended their lives together by jumping from this bridge linking Phang Nga and Phuket provinces. Locals say that on nights of the full moon, two white rabbits with glowing red eyes appear—believed to be the spirits of the star-crossed lovers.
- Chumphon Railway Bridge: A section of the Southern Line railway in Amphoe Pathio, Chumphon province, this viaduct has earned a grim reputation due to the unusually high number of deaths reported there. Locals have dubbed it the "Bridge of a Hundred Bodies", and the haunting tale was featured on the well-known paranormal TV program Khon Uad Phee in August 2013.
- Khao Lak: A famous marine attraction in Phang Nga was heavily affected by the 2004 Indian Ocean earthquake and tsunami, which claimed hundreds of lives. Since then, hotels in the area have been rumored to be haunted.
- Soi Atthakawee Sunthon (Grandma Speed – Wat Khok Now) Haunted alley near Wat Khok Now in Hat Yai city, Songkhla province. Locals believe it is the home of Grandma Speed's spirit, a fast spirit that chases after motorcycles.
- Wiang Sa Ancient City: The ancient city of Thailand covers an area of 218 rai and is approximately 2,000 years old. It is very prosperous. It is located on the banks of the Tapi River. There was trade with China, which was evident during the Liang Dynasty. It was called Pan-Pan City, and other kingdoms such as Persia, as evidenced by archaeological evidence. This city was under the care of the Srivijaya Kingdom and the Tampraling Kingdom. It is believed that this city was once the center of the Srivijaya Kingdom for a period of time. Later, the city collapsed due to an epidemic, causing the city to be abandoned, becoming a dense forest. There is a temple outside the city until today. Currently, this city is under the care of the Fine Arts Department. The villagers believe that this is the location of the secret city. If you do something bad, you might get lost in this forest.
- National Highway No. 44 (Southern Seaborn Road) This road cuts through Kanchanadit district, Mueang Surat Thani district, Phunphin district, Ban Na Doem district, Khian Sa district, Phrasaeng district, Surat Thani province and Plai Phraya district, Ao Luek district, Krabi province. The road was one of the land bridge projects of the Thai government, but the project was not successful. There are no lights along the way, making it a murder hotspot and dumping ground for corpses. There are ghosts haunting motorists, especially a girl in black.
- Tontok Waterfall: The waterfall, considered the most beautiful in Trang province, is located in Palian district. In November 2023, two police teams raided a rainforest retreat near the site in pursuit of a regional influential fugitive known as Sia Paeng. Despite several days of searching, he remained elusive. During their stay, officers reported being haunted by the ghost of a pregnant woman while resting in an abandoned hut near the falls. According to a 63-year-old local resident, the ghost is believed to be that of a woman who was strangled to death by a large python while tapping rubber in 1990. The hut, once her residence, has been abandoned ever since.

== See also ==
- Thai ghosts
- List of reportedly haunted locations
