= Women in Black of Wat Samian Nari =

Urban legend from Bangkok, Thailand

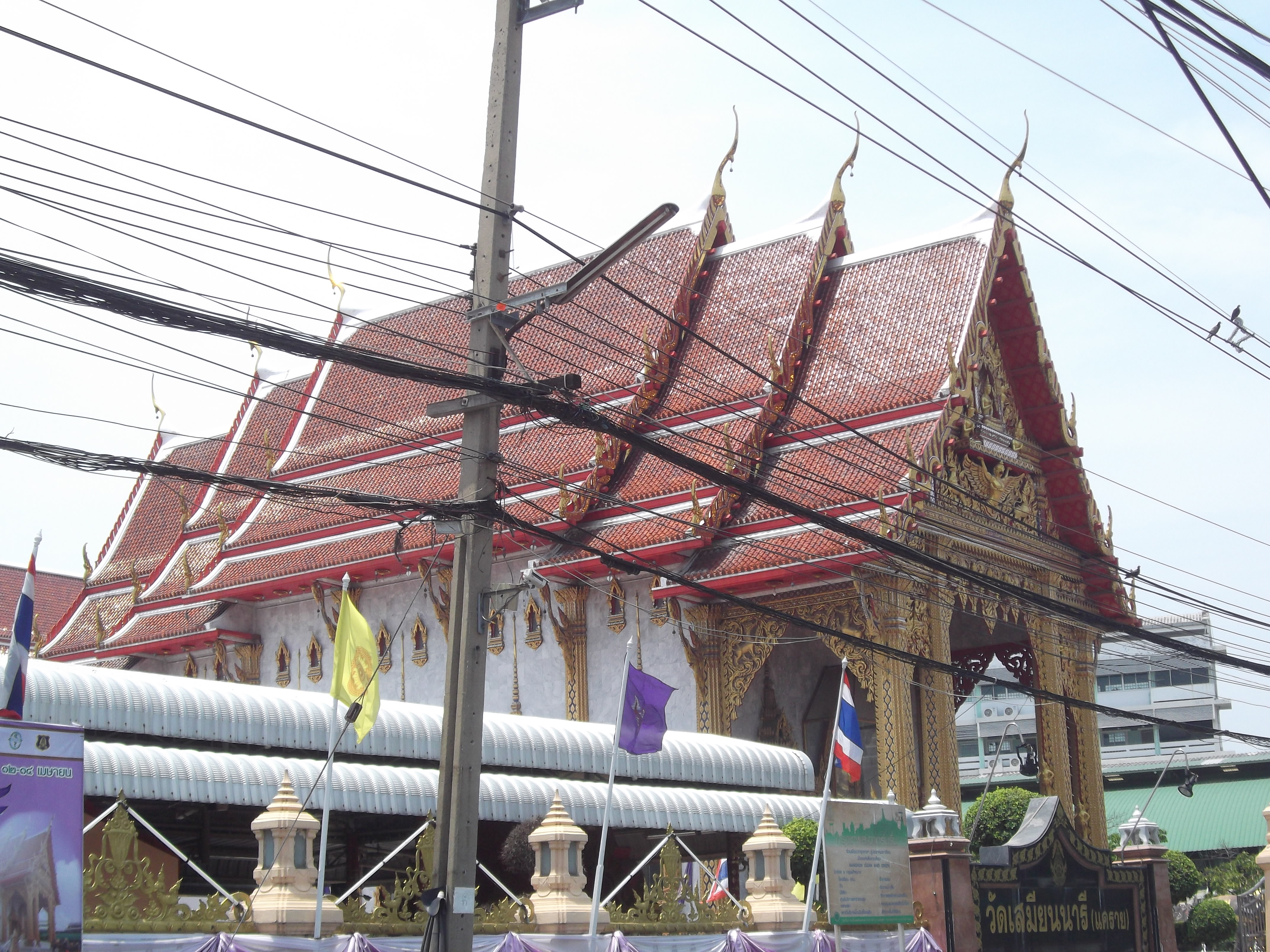
Wat Samian Nari, the place where the Women in Black were reportedly seen

The Women in Black of Wat Samian Nari is a Thai urban legend that revolves around the ghosts of two women dressed in black, who are said to appear near the front of Wat Samian Nari in Bangkok late at night. It is considered one of the most famous contemporary urban legends of Bangkok.

== Description ==
The legend of the 'Women in Black' first began to circulate around the 1990s. Witnesses commonly describe the women as beautiful figures dressed entirely in black. They were often seen in Bangkok's nightlife districts, such as RCA or Ratchadaphisek, hailing a taxi after midnight and asking to be taken to Wat Samian Nari. During the ride, the two women would remain completely silent. They never spoke to each other and kept their eyes fixed straight ahead. Some drivers later admitted that they felt uneasy, sensing something was not quite right. A few even tried to start a conversation, but the women never replied.

When the taxi finally arrived at the temple gates, the passengers would suddenly vanish without a trace. Confused and disturbed, some drivers stepped out of their cars, only to be horrified by what they saw. The two women were crawling across the railway tracks that run past the temple, their bodies drenched in blood and severed in half, dragging themselves forward in a dreadful and anguished manner.

=== Variations ===
Some versions of the story claim that the two women were sisters dressed in black because they were on their way to their mother's funeral, but they died before ever reaching it. Others say that when a driver dropped them off, he suddenly saw the women standing outside his window, staring in at him with pale faces and blood-red eyes, with dark streams of blood trickling down. A taxi driver reported that he once received a 50-baht bill as the fare, and the woman declined to take any change. The next morning, when he opened his wallet, the banknote had inexplicably turned into a leaf.

There are also those who insist that even if one never encounters the apparitions directly, strange things still happen when passing in front of Wat Samian Nari. Whether in broad daylight or in the dead of night, engines are said to mysteriously sputter or stall for no apparent reason.

== Reported sightings ==
In 2005, the popular paranormal television program Horror Hour, broadcast on Channel 7, hosted by Kanchai Kamnerdploy and Kapol Thongplub, featured the story of the Women in Black of Wat Samian Nari. The show invited two taxi drivers who claimed to have personally encountered the women. Sketches were drawn from their memories, revealing one woman with short hair and another with long hair. The drivers confirmed that the sketches resembled what they saw with an accuracy of 80 to 90 percent. One of the taxi drivers was so disturbed by the experience that he gave up the profession altogether.

In the program, additional information was revealed: the women were sisters with the surname Tipsuksri, named Chulee and Sulee. They had died in the early 1990s after being struck by a train in front of Wat Samian Nari. The tragedy was so shocking that it was reported on the front pages of local newspapers.

Another man who reportedly encountered the two women was Sutthipong Eiamsa-ard. His experience was similar to that of the two taxi drivers, but it is believed to have taken place around 2000. The encounter left him so shocked that he lost consciousness and later awoke in a hospital. Since that incident, Sutthipong has suffered from an irregular heartbeat and has had to rely on medication. Even at the time when the program featured his story, he was still under treatment and dependent on the medicine. In a separate incident, a man recalled passing Wat Samian Nari one night in 1997. While he had stopped his car to relieve himself on the roadside, his wife suddenly came to tell him to look back at their vehicle. To his horror, he saw two women dressed entirely in black standing beside the car, staring at their child who was sitting alone in the back seat. Moments later, the women vanished before his eyes, leaving an unforgettable impression.

In June 2024, Thairath Studio interviewed Somkiat Sapchalerm, a reporter from Pathum Thani who claimed he was the first to publicize the story of the two Women in Black. At the time, he was driving a late-night taxi in northern Bangkok, near Chatuchak and Bang Sue.

One night, he picked up two women dressed entirely in black. The two of them had somehow gotten into the car in such silence that he was startled, not even knowing when it had happened, and in that stillness their presence felt unnervingly heavy. Only the long-haired woman spoke, softly uttering the word "Wat Samian" to indicate their destination. She sat in the front beside him, her body slightly turned toward the window and her face always looking away from him, never changing position throughout the ride, while the short-haired woman sat silently in the back, completely invisible in the rearview mirror.

Near the temple, he intended not to drive in, but the car moved to stop in front of the crematorium. The meter showed around 30 baht, and the long-haired woman said "30", he agreed. Then, both vanished mysteriously.

Unaware that they were not human, he asked an old man walking by if he had seen them. The man replied, "Those two girls again ? Forgive them."

Somkiat gradually realized that the two women were not human the next day. His daytime taxi partner said he had no passengers all day, yet another driver reported seeing the women sitting in Somkiat's car the entire day.

He later recounted the story via a public phone on a popular ghost radio show hosted by Kapol Thongplub, receiving overwhelming responses. Messages came in like "The scariest story of the night" and "Where is this driver? What's the car number?"

A year later, after quitting taxi driving, he returned to work and tuned in to the same show, which was discussing his case. He called in because another man, a company employee, reported a similar encounter. The host arranged a three-way conversation, and Somkiat learned the truth: the two women were not sisters but friends, dressed in black to hurry to the cremation of the long-haired woman's boyfriend. They rode a motorcycle together, but the bike stalled on the railway tracks just as a train approached, killing them instantly.

The old man they had met was not alive either, but the temple's deceased undertaker. Somkiat's encounter occurred around 1992.

== Research ==
In 2020, Channel 9 MCOT HD news investigated the legend of the Women in Black at Wat Samian Nari. The temple, located in Lat Yao, Chatuchak, northern Bangkok, is over 100 years old, dating back to King Rama V's reign. A canal Khlong Prem Prachakon runs alongside, and the northern railway line and Kamphaeng Phet 6 Road pass in front. At night, the area is particularly dark and quiet.

A tuk-tuk driver who has worked in the area for over ten years said he had heard the story but never encountered anything. One taxi driver reportedly saw a woman in black waving for a ride at night five years ago, but she vanished suddenly.

The abbot, who has served for over 50 years, said he has heard the tale since taking office 30 years ago, but he, the monks, and local residents have never seen anything. He believes it is merely a story passed down by word of mouth. While train accidents in front of the temple have occurred, there is no evidence of any ghost.

Furthermore, searches of Khaosod's archives back to 1997 revealed no reports of a train accident killing women in two halves in front of the temple.

== See more ==
- Woman in Black
- Teke Teke
- Vanishing hitchhiker
- Mae Nak
- List of urban legends
- List of reportedly haunted highways
- List of reportedly haunted locations in Thailand
