= Prem Pracha Vana Rak Park =

Park in Bangkok, Thailand

- สวนเปรมประชาวนารักษ์
- Location: Lak Si, Bangkok, Thailand
- Area: 10 rai (1.6 ha; 4.0 acres)

Prem Pracha Vana Rak Park (Thai: สวนเปรมประชาวนารักษ์; RTGS: Prem Pracha Wanarak) is a 10 rai (1.6 ha) park in Bangkok, Thailand, located in Lak Si district between Kamphaeng Phet 6 Road and Khlong Prem Prachakon. The park was opened by King Vajiralongkorn and Queen Suthida on 10 December 2024.
