= Lat Yao =

Lat Yao may refer to:

- Lat Yao District, a district (amphoe) in Thailand's Nakhon Sawan Province
  - Lat Yao Subdistrict, a subdistrict (tambon) within the district
- Lat Yao Subdistrict, Bangkok, a subdistrict (khwaeng) in Bangkok's Chatuchak District
- Lat Yao Prison, an informal name of Klong Prem Central Prison, in Chatuchak's Lat Yao Subdistrict
