= Lat Yao subdistrict, Bangkok =

Lat Yao ลาดยาว
- Khwaeng
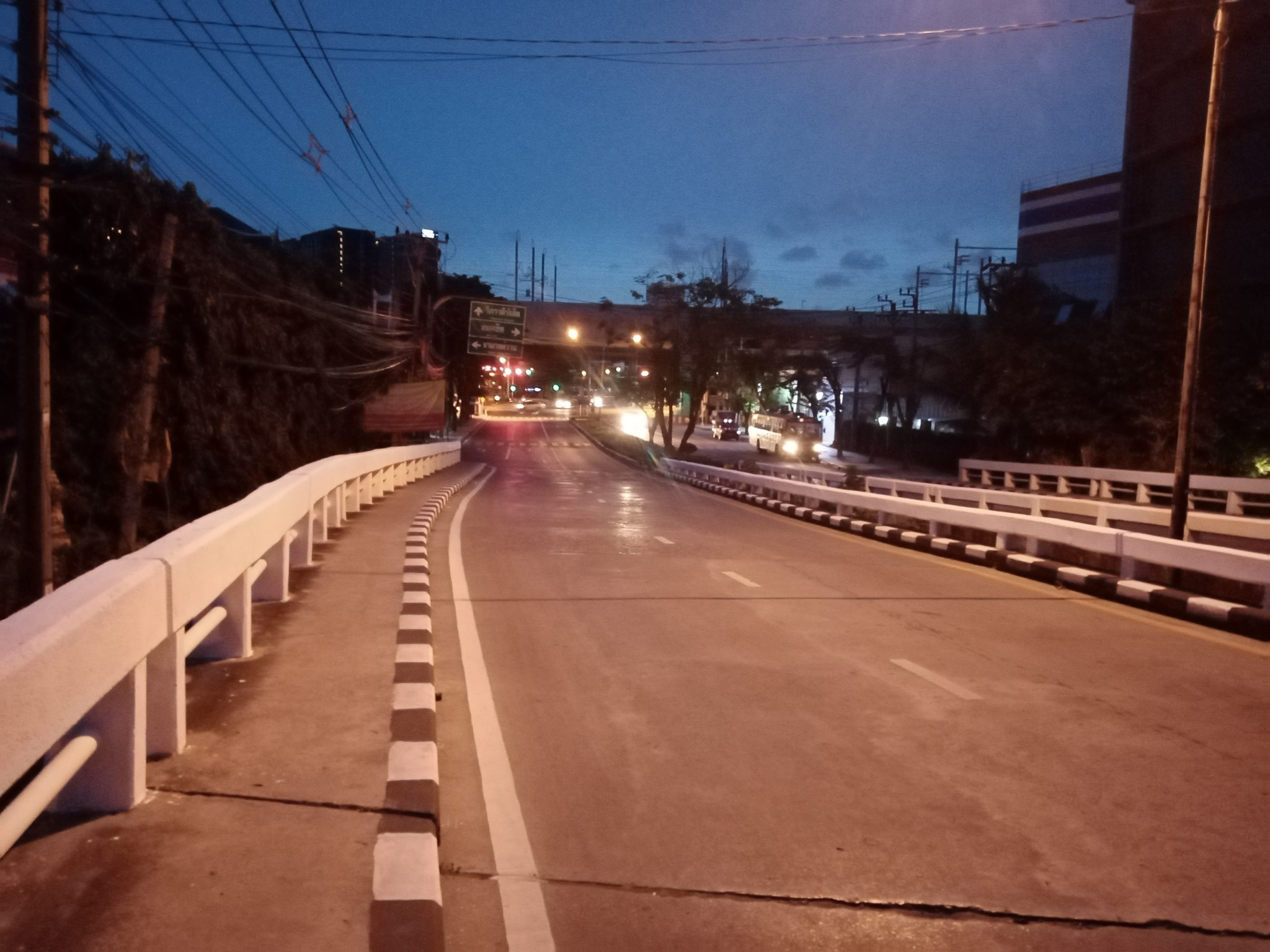
- A bridge over Khlong Prem Prachakon beside Wat Samian Nari at daybreak, Lat Yao

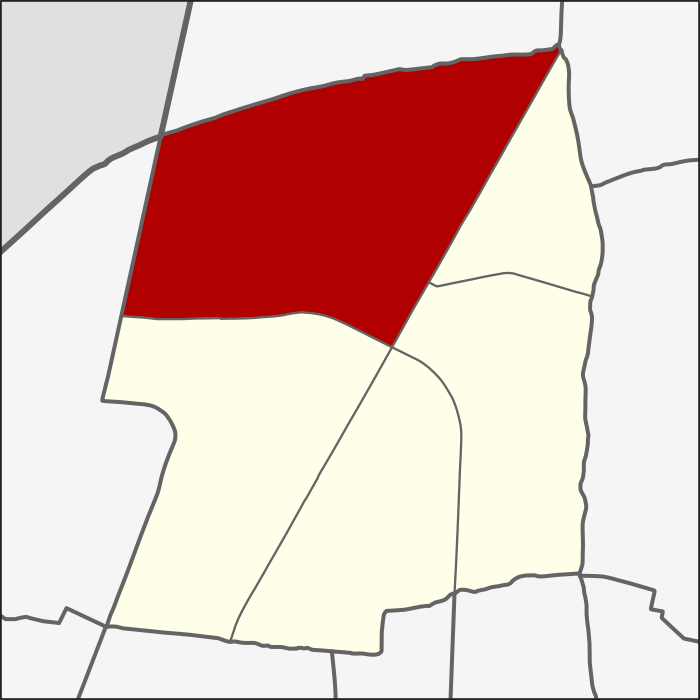
- Location in Chatuchak District
- Country: Thailand
- Province: Bangkok
- Khet: Chatuchak
- Named for: Khlong Lat Yao

Area
  - Total: 10.69 km^{2} (4.13 sq mi)

Population (2020)
  - Total: 41,238
- Time zone: UTC+7 (ICT)
- Postal code: 10900
- TIS 1099: 103001

Lat Yao (Thai: ลาดยาว, pronounced [lâːt jāːw]) is a khwaeng (subdistrict) of Chatuchak District, in Bangkok, Thailand. In 2020, it had a total population of 41,238 people.

Its name "Lat Yao" comes from a khlong (canal) in the same name that runs through this area. Lat Yao used to occupy the entire area of Chatuchak. Until in late 2003, the subdistrict was divided into five subdistricts, as in the present.
