= Woman in Black (supernatural) =

Supernatural figure in Appalachian folklore

In Appalachian folklore, a "Woman in Black" is a supernatural figure appearing in various regions throughout the Southern United States and the Western United States in the early to mid 1900s.

== History ==
According to legend, a Woman in Black typically appeared to men who had misbehaved, cheated on their wives, or committed some moral transgression. Folklore holds that towns such as Bristol, Virginia, Tazewell, Virginia, Lynchburg, Virginia, Richmond, Virginia and Jackson, Minnesota were visited by a Woman in Black. According to one tale, she appeared "suddenly and unexpectedly" in Roanoke, Virginia in 1902 to men who had stayed too long at their club, insisting they go home as quickly as possible. Sometimes a Woman in Black was said to hit, pummel, or knock a man down to the ground or "slap him to the earth with a swish of her phantom garments" as retribution for his sins. If continued, the men would be killed at the location where he committed his act.

It was said that her alleged appearances in Roanoke had the salutary effect of keeping married men home with their wives and families rather than going out each night. One account claims she appeared suddenly to four men of the Disciples of Christ church in Tazewell, Virginia, and scared them so badly they all ran home.

Prominent politicians and businessmen were sometimes rumored to have been visited by a Woman in Black. In March 1902, it was claimed that H. S. Wetherald, editor of the Alma Journal; Frank Griggsby, the area's leading carriage dealer; and Ashton C. Shallenberger, then the congressman of Nebraska's Fifth District, and later governor of Nebraska, had been "spooked" by a Woman in Black in Alma, Nebraska.

== See also ==
- La Llorona
- The Woman in Black – 1983 horror novel by Susan Hill
- Women in Black of Wat Samian Nari – a well-known Thai urban legend about ghosts of two women in black

== Bibliography ==
- Roberts, Nancy, and Nancy Roberts. Ghosts of the Southern Mountains and Appalachia. Columbia, S.C.: University of South Carolina Press, 1988. Discusses the woman in black from the Smokey Mountains of Tennessee.
- Schlosser, S. E. Spooky South: Tales of Hauntings, Strange Happenings, and Other Local Lore. "The woman in black (Savannah, Georgia)". 2016.
- Taylor, L. B. The Big Book of Virginia Ghost Stories. Mechanicsburg, PA: Stackpole Books, 2010.
- Taylor, L. B., and Mark A. Davis. L.B. Taylor, Jr.'s Ghost Stories of Virginia. "The woman in black (Smoky Mountains, Tennessee)". Volume One. Volume One. [Place of publication not identified]: In Mind, Inc, 2004.
- Taylor, L. B. Haunted Roanoke. 2013. "Roanoke's phantom woman in black".
