= Chakri Maha Prasat Throne Hall =

Coordinates: 13.7501°N 100.4913°E

- พระที่นั่งจักรีมหาปราสาท
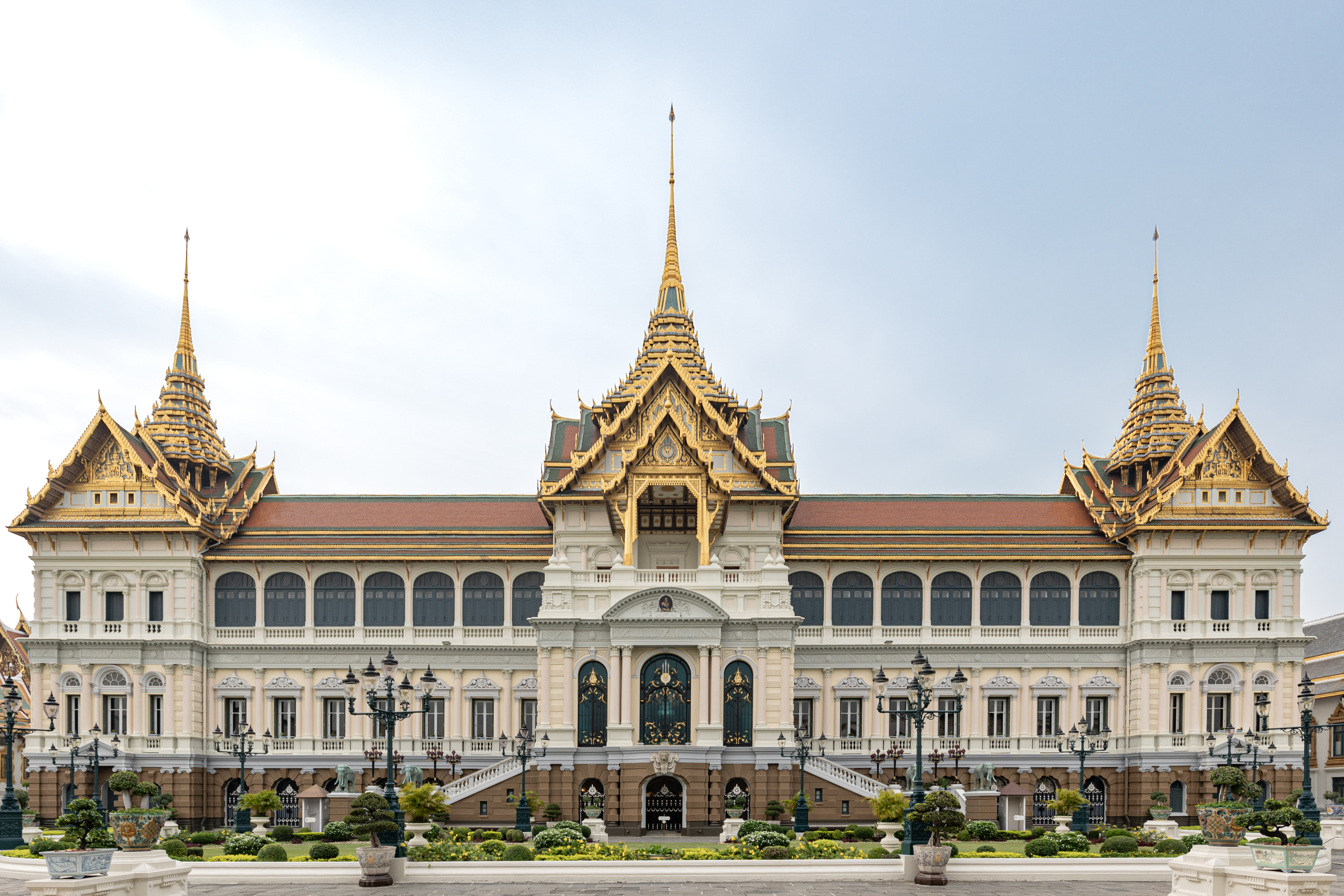
- Interactive map of the Chakri Maha Prasat Throne Hall area

General information
- Location: Phra Borom Maha Ratchawang subdistrict, Phra Nakhon district, Bangkok, Thailand
- Year built: 1876

Height
- Architectural: A blend of Thai and Western architecture.

Design and construction
- Architects: John Clunis (English architect); Chao Phraya Bhanuwong Mahakosathibodi (Chief Engineer); Phraya Wiang Nai Narubal (Supervisor)

Chakri Maha Prasat Throne Hall (Thai: พระที่นั่งจักรีมหาปราสาท) it is one of the eight royal halls and serves as the principal building of the Chakri Maha Prasat complex, situated in the central area of the Grand Palace. The structure was commissioned by Chulalongkorn in 1876.Situated between the Phra Maha Monthien and the Phra Maha Prasat groups, it consists of three prasats aligned along an east-west axis, with each structure connected by a series of residential galleries (muk krasan) throughout the entire length.

The Chakri Maha Prasat Throne Hall is distinguished from other buildings within the complex by its unique fusion of Thai and Western architectural styles. While the main structure follows a Western design, it is crowned with a traditional Thai-style roof—a characteristic that has earned it the popular epithet "Farang Suam Chada" (a Westerner wearing a Thai crown/headdress).

Due to its architectural distinction, the Chakri Maha Prasat Throne Hall has become one of the most prominent landmarks and major tourist attractions within the Grand Palace, on par with the Emerald Buddha housed in the ordination hall of Wat Phra Kaew.

== History ==
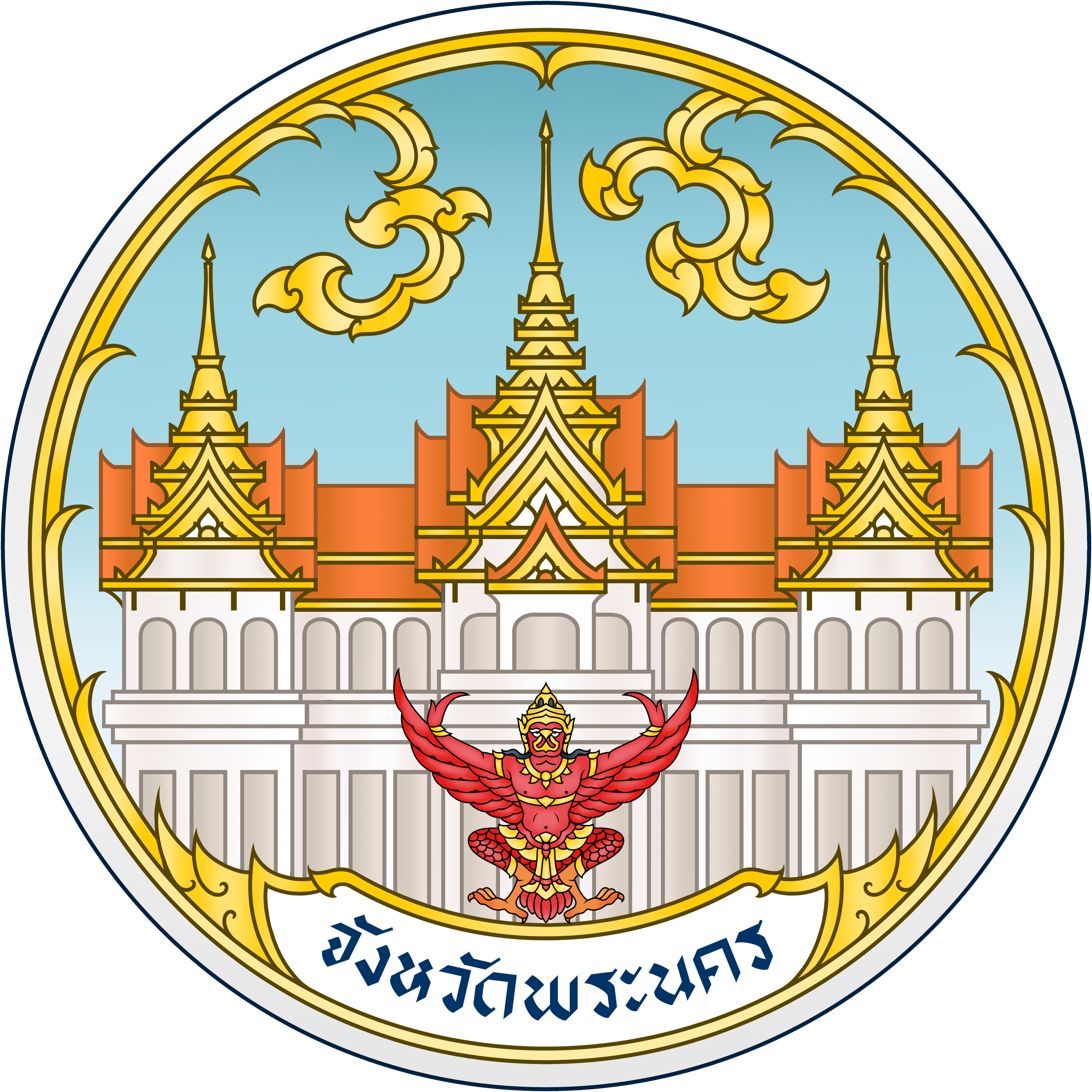
During the period when Bangkok was officially designated as Phra Nakhon Province, the Fine Arts Department adopted the image of the Chakri Maha Prasat Throne Hall as the provincial seal

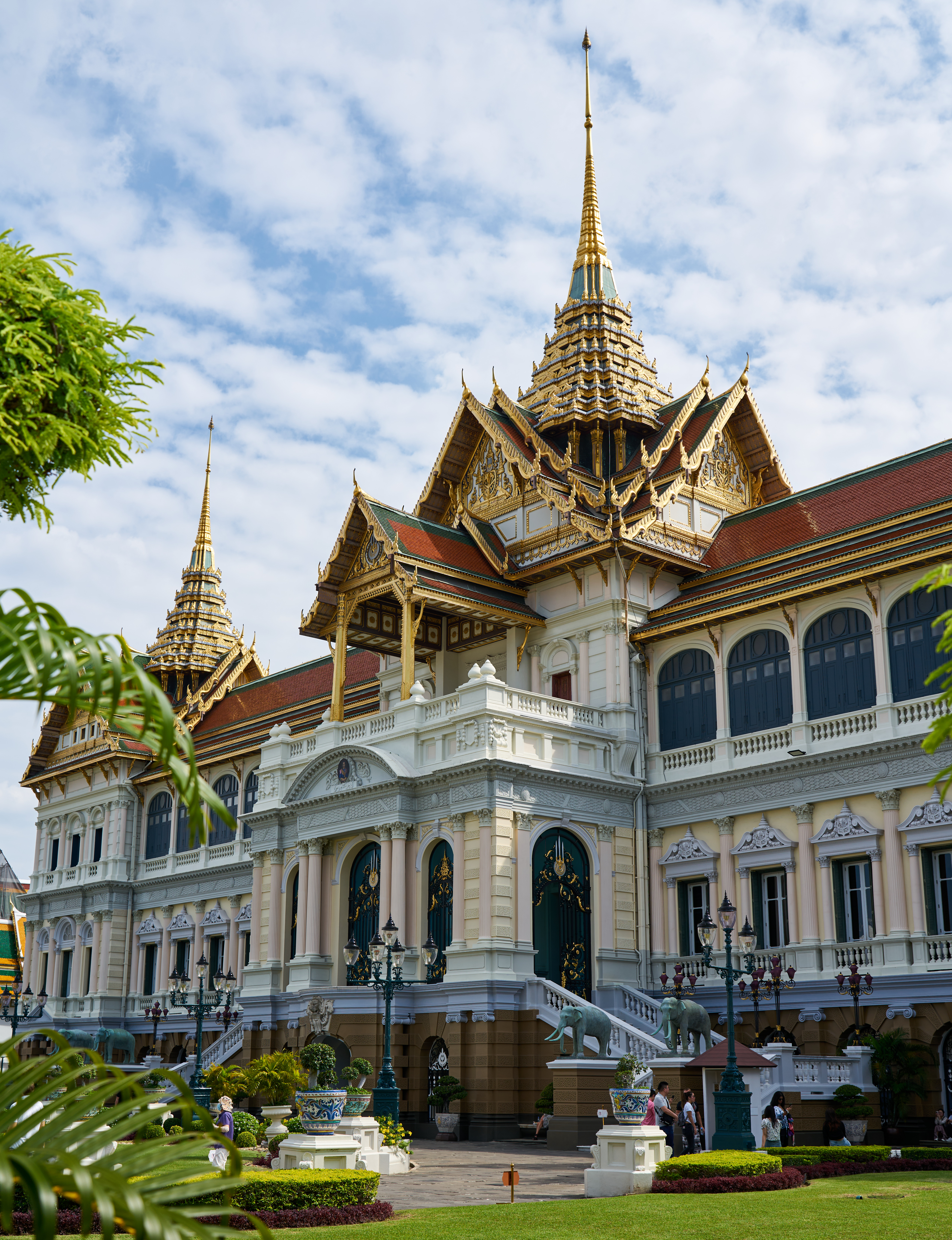
Chakri Maha Prasat Throne Hall (Photo taken in 2023)

The Chakri Maha Prasat Throne Hall was commissioned by Chulalongkorn in 1876 following his return from private visits to Singapore and Java. Intended to serve as the throne hall for the Grand Palace, the structure is situated between the Phra Maha Monthien and the Phra Maha Prasat groups.

Chulalongkorn commissioned the British architect John Clunis, based in Singapore, as the chief architect to design the throne hall, with Henry Clunis Rose serving as the assistant architect. Chao Phraya Phanuwong Maha Kosa Thibodi (Tuam Bunnag) was appointed as the Chief Engineer of the construction, while Phraya Wiang Nai Naruban oversaw all operations, and Phra Praditkan Phakdi was responsible for supervising the accounts and materials. Chulalongkorn presided over the foundation stone laying ceremony on May 7, 1876.

Originally, the Chakri Maha Prasat complex comprised 11 interconnected throne halls. Today, only three remain: the Chakri Maha Prasat Throne Hall, the Moon Sathan Borom Aht Throne Hall, and the Sommuthi Thewarat Upat Throne Hall. The latter two structures were dismantled and reconstructed during the reign of Bhumibol Adulyadej. Additionally, in 1999, a project was launched to construct an extension at the rear of the Chakri Maha Prasat Throne Hall to host state banquets for royal guests. This extension was completed in June 2006, just in time for its first official use during the 60th Anniversary Celebrations of Bhumibol Adulyadej's Accession.

Initially, Chulalongkorn intended for the new throne hall to be designed entirely in a Western style. However, Somdet Chaophraya Borom Maha Sri Suriwongse petitioned the King to incorporate traditional Thai architectural elements. Consequently, the King ordered the design to be modified, resulting in the iconic roof featuring three Thai-style spires (prasat) aligned in a row. The King presided over the raising of the spires in 1878, and the royal inauguration ceremony was held in 1882, during which he graciously bestowed upon the building the name Chakri Maha Prasat Throne Hall.

The top floor of this throne hall serves as the repository for the royal ashes of monarchs and their queens, beginning from the reign of Mongkut (Rama IV). The hall is also used for formal functions, such as granting audiences to diplomatic envoys and high-ranking officials, as well as hosting distinguished guests. Inside, it houses the Phutthan Thom Throne, the official royal seat of the Chakri Maha Prasat Throne Hall. This throne is crafted from wood encased in silver with nielloware (thom) and gilded gold—a technique known as thom ta thong—making it the largest piece of gold-nielloware in Thailand.

The large chandelier in the throne hall was not originally commissioned for the palace. It was initially ordered by Somdet Chaophraya Borom Maha Sri Suriwongse for his personal residence; however, upon realizing it was too large for the space, he presented it as a gift to Chulalongkorn.

The Chakri Maha Prasat Throne Hall also holds the distinction of being the first building in Thailand to be illuminated by electricity. This was initiated by Prince Devawongse Varoprakar, who, having witnessed electric lighting during his travels in the West, sought to introduce the technology to Siam.

The Chakri Maha Prasat Throne Hall served as the venue where the Thai monarch hosted leaders of the Asia-Pacific Economic Cooperation (APEC) during the APEC Thailand 2003, for which Thailand served as the host nation. and APEC Thailand 2022
