= Wat Prasat, Nonthaburi =

Thai temple

Wat Prasat
- วัดปราสาท
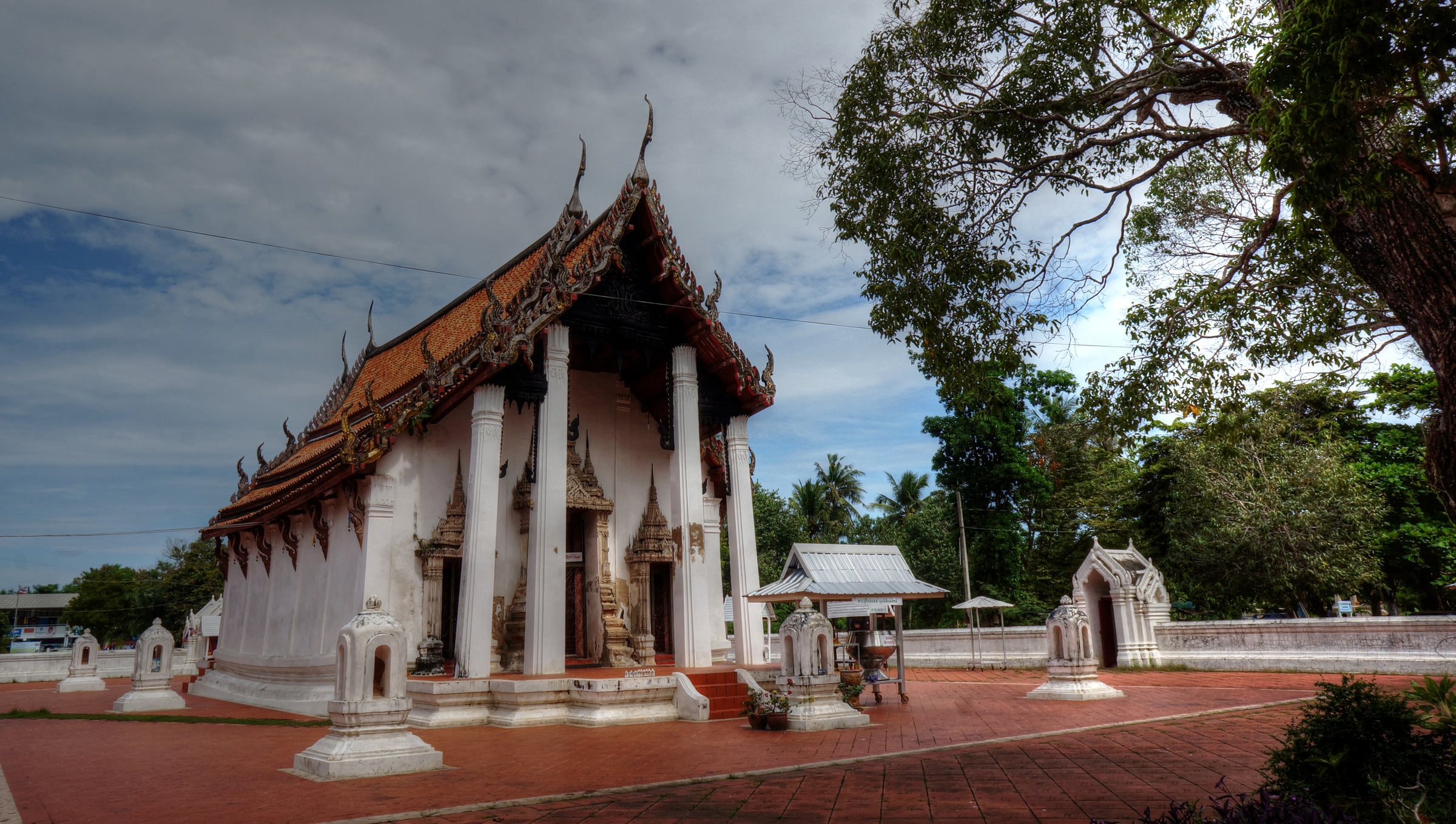

Religion
- Affiliation: Buddhism
- Sect: Mahayana

Location
- Location: Bang Kruai-Sai Noi Road, Bang Krang, Nonthaburi 11000
- Country: Thailand
- Interactive map of Wat Prasat
- Coordinates: 13.83947°N 100.45186°E

Wat Prasat, Nonthaburi (Thai: วัดปราสาท, RTGS: Wat Prasat, pronounced [wát prās̄āth], Temple of Prasat) is the oldest temple in Nonthaburi, Thailand. Wat Prasat was built in the reign of King Prasat Thong.

Wat Prasat is in Bang Krang Subdistrict, Mueang Nonthaburi District, Nonthaburi Province. Its mural is the work of the province's most admired artist and is the oldest painting in Nonthaburi Province. The temple is in the Mahayana sect, a temple that was bestowed upon Wisungkhamsima (วิสุงคามสีมา) for tourism. It is registered as a National Historic Site. Its date of construction is unknown. Sources variously say that Wat Prasat was built in the reign of King Prasat Thong or in the reign of King Narai.

== Ubosot ==
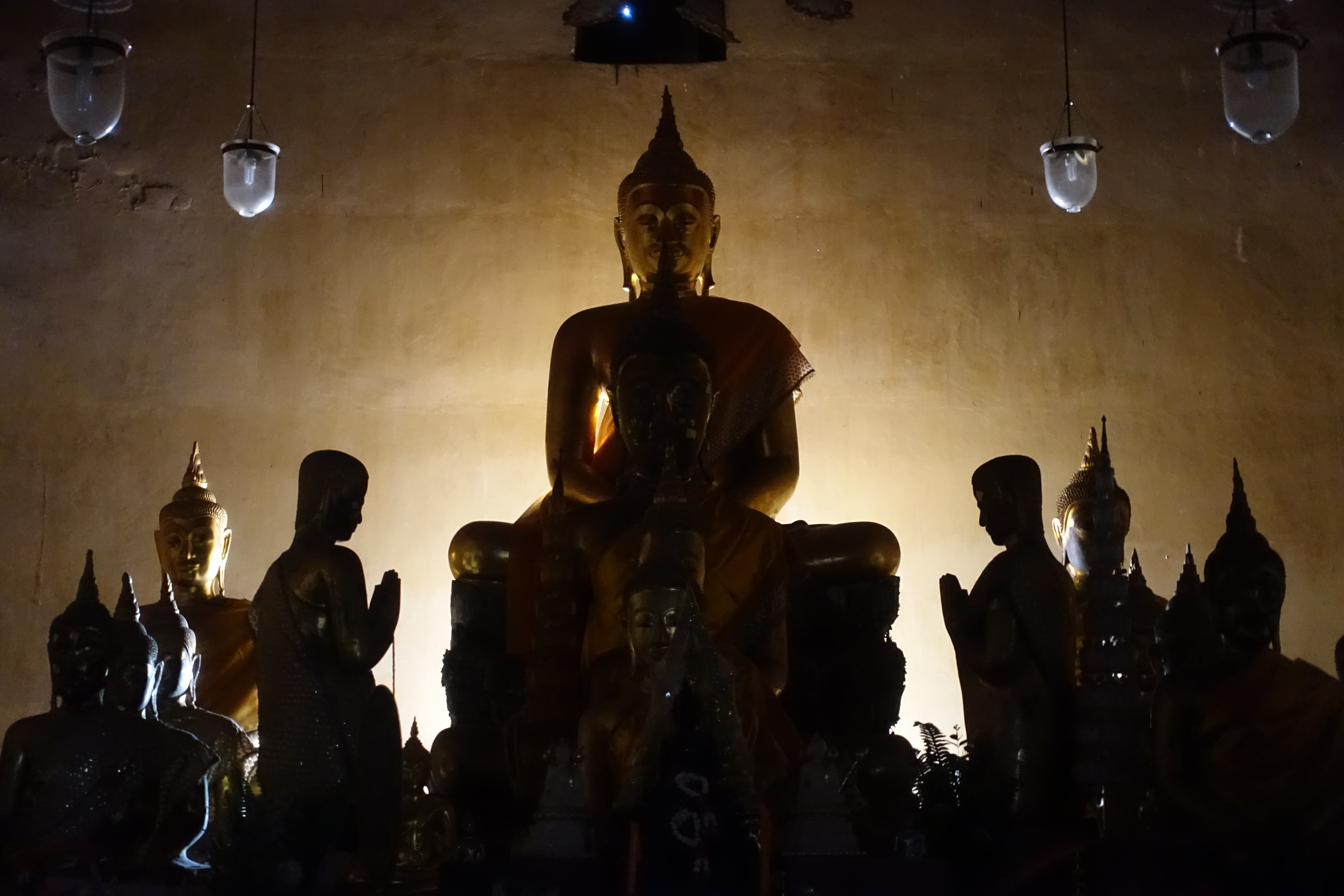
Principal Buddha Image

The entrance door of ubosot has 3 doors decorated by three golden prasat. Temples are usually built with five golden prasat. The architecture is very meticulous.

=== Interior ===
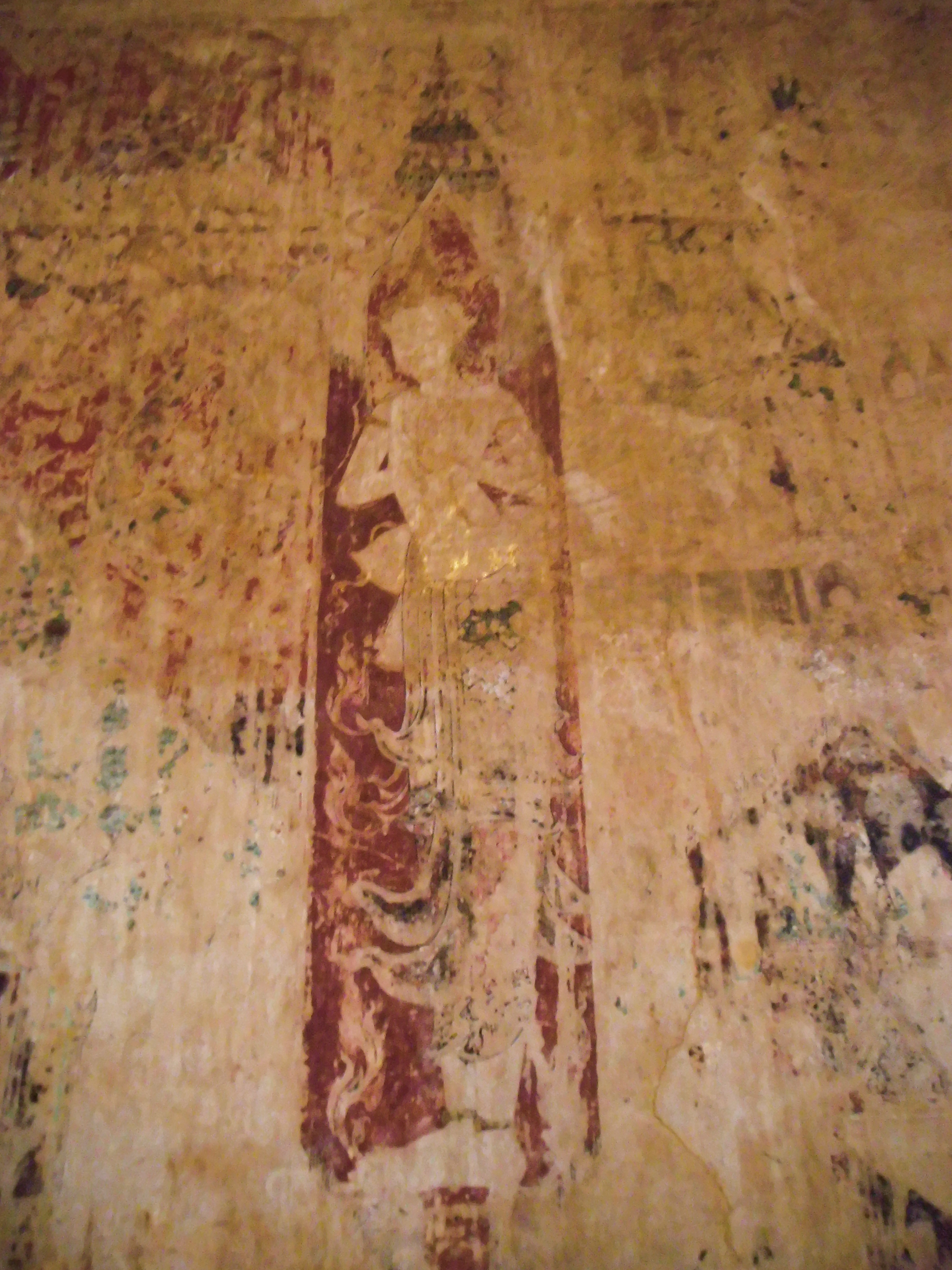
Mural in Wat Prasat, Nonthaburi

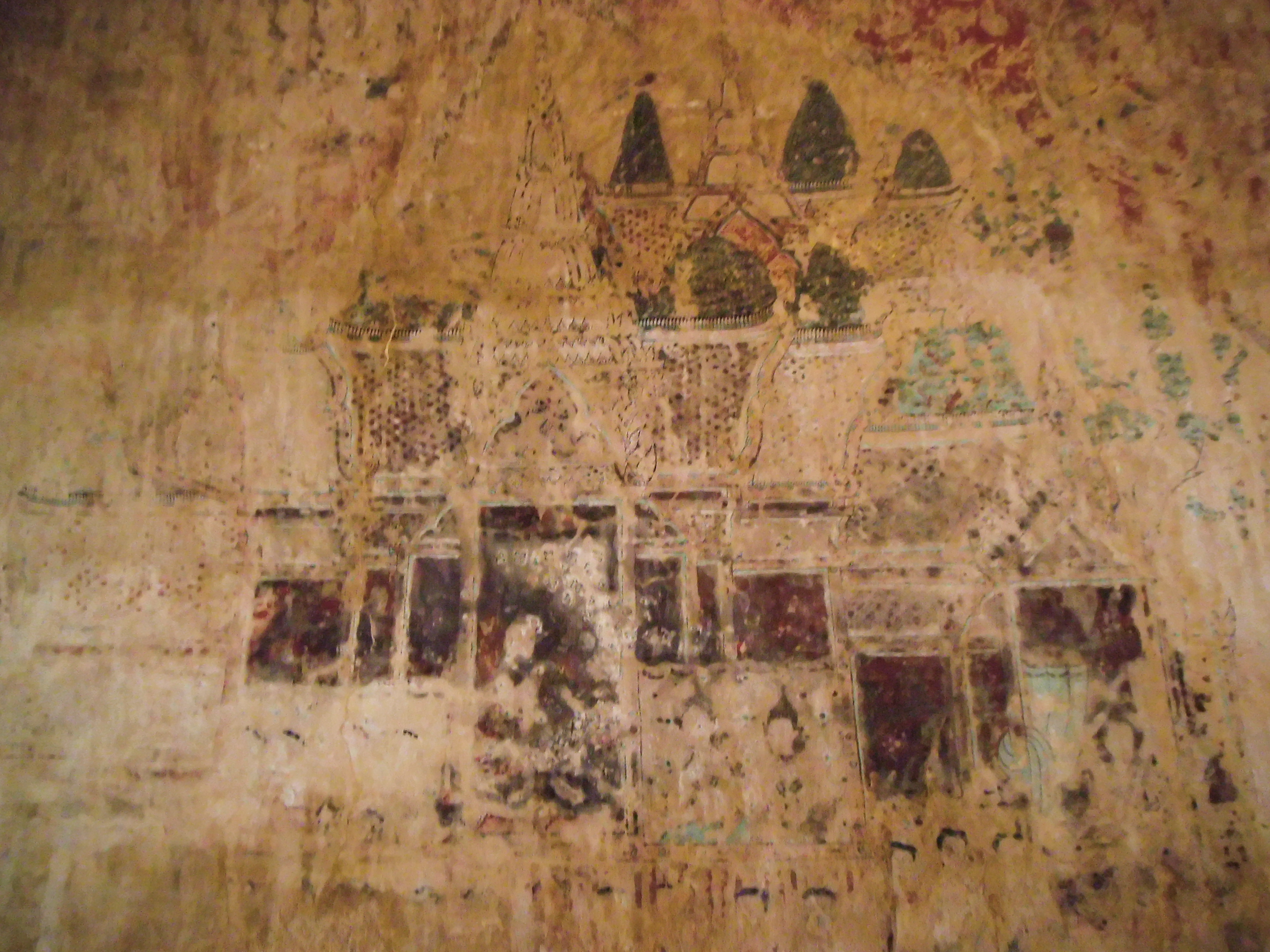
Mural in Wat Prasat, Nonthaburi

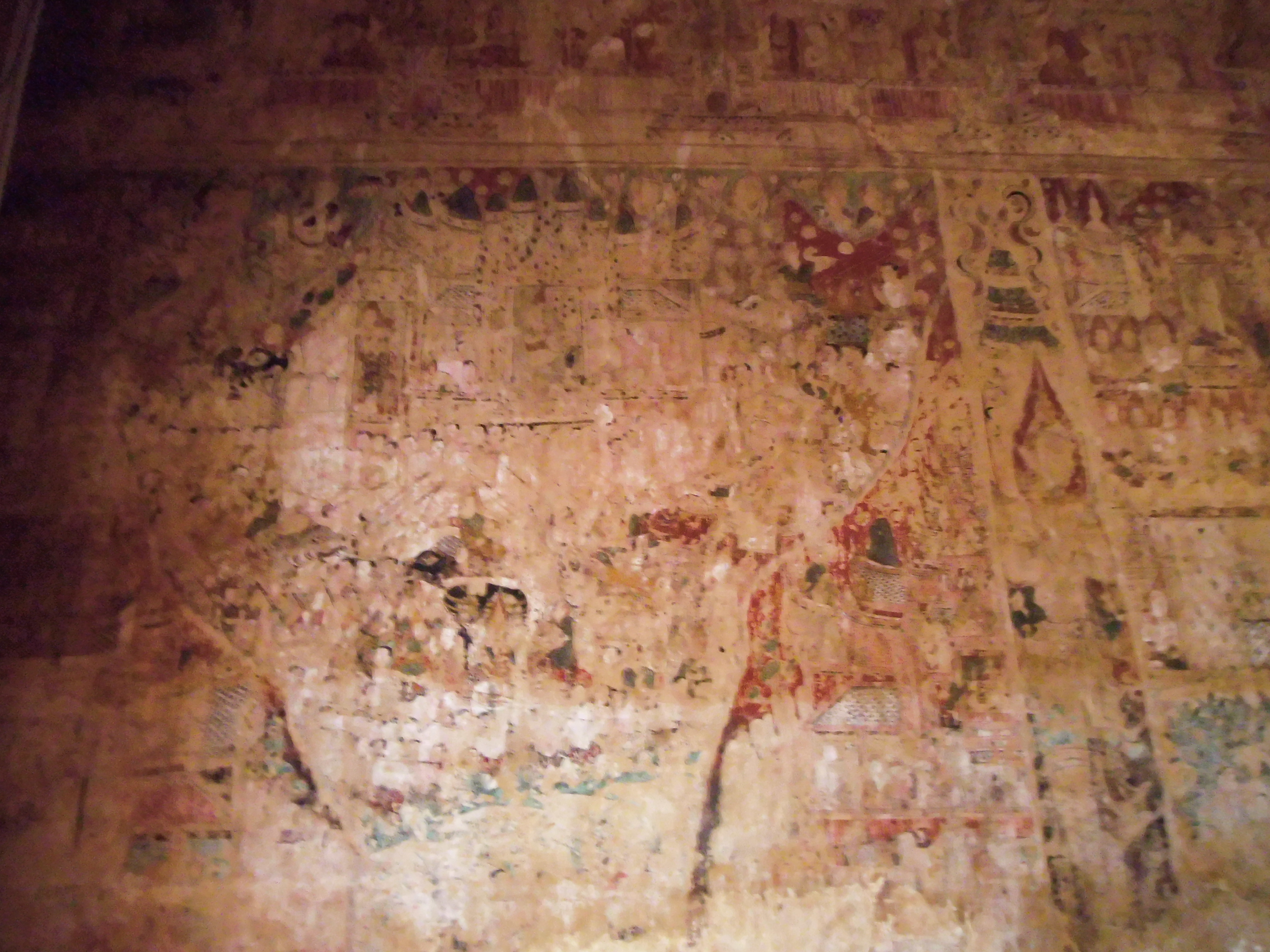
Mural in Wat Prasat, Nonthaburi

Murals were added in the late Ayutthaya period. Nonthaburi craftsmen depicted the birth of ten Buddhas, and are considered some of the oldest murals in Nonthaburi.

== Temple area ==
A wooden shrine is inside the temple. The Ta-khian tree was discovered on 3 November 2007 by landowner Thang Mae who sold the land attached to Wat Prasat to Pinsiri Village.

== See also ==
- Wat Chaiwatthanaram
- Meditation attitude
