= Wat Samian Nari =

Temple in Bangkok, Thailand

Coordinates: 13°50′24″N 100°33′22″E

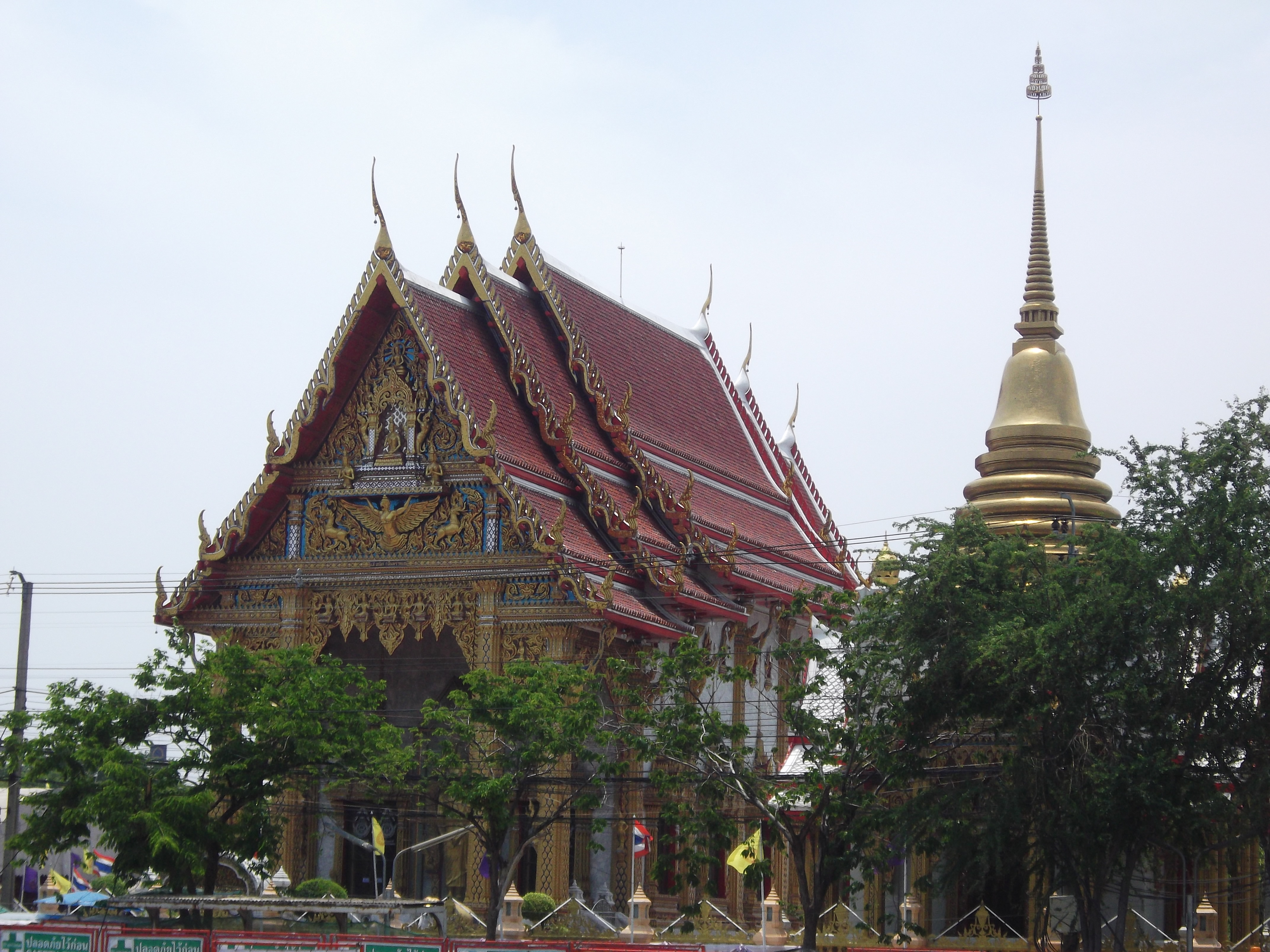
Wat Samian Nari

Wat Samian Nari (Thai: วัดเสมียนนารี, pronounced [wát sā.mǐa̯n nāː.rīː]) is a civil temple in Thailand, located at 32 Moo 2, Vibhavadi Rangsit Road, Lat Yao Subdistrict, Chatuchak District, Bangkok, with a total area of 18 rai (about 7.11 acres) next to Northern Railway Line and close to Bang Son Station.

Wat Samian Nari established in 1857 under the name "Wat Khae Rai" (วัดแคราย). In the year 1877, it was restored by Samian Kham (เสมียนขำ), the prime donor for temple restoration, who was a female clerk in the royal treasury in the reign of King Chulalongkorn (Rama V). So it was changed to the name "Samian Nari" in 1979 in honour of her, because the word "Samian Nari" means "female clerk" or "lady clerk" in Thai.

Inside main hall which is of a Thai architectural style with stucco and gilded decoration, the Principal Buddha image called Phra Sakkaya Buddhawongmuni (พระศรีศากยะพุทธวงศ์มุนี) is enshrined. In 1988 the temple was chosen by the Department of Religious Affairs as a Good Development Example Monastery of Bangkok.

Moreover, it is also the location of the third milestone of the Khlong Prem Prachakon, the khlong that was canalized in the reign of King Chulalongkorn.

This temple is rumored to be haunted, with urban legends telling of two sisters dressed in black who haunt people or vehicles passing through the area. It is believed that their bodies were tragically crushed by a train in the 1990s; however, a search of Khao Sod's database dating back to 1997 found no evidence to support this story.
