= Khlong Prem Prachakon =

Canal in Bangkok, Thailand

Coordinates: 13°45′40.54″N 100°30′42.55″E

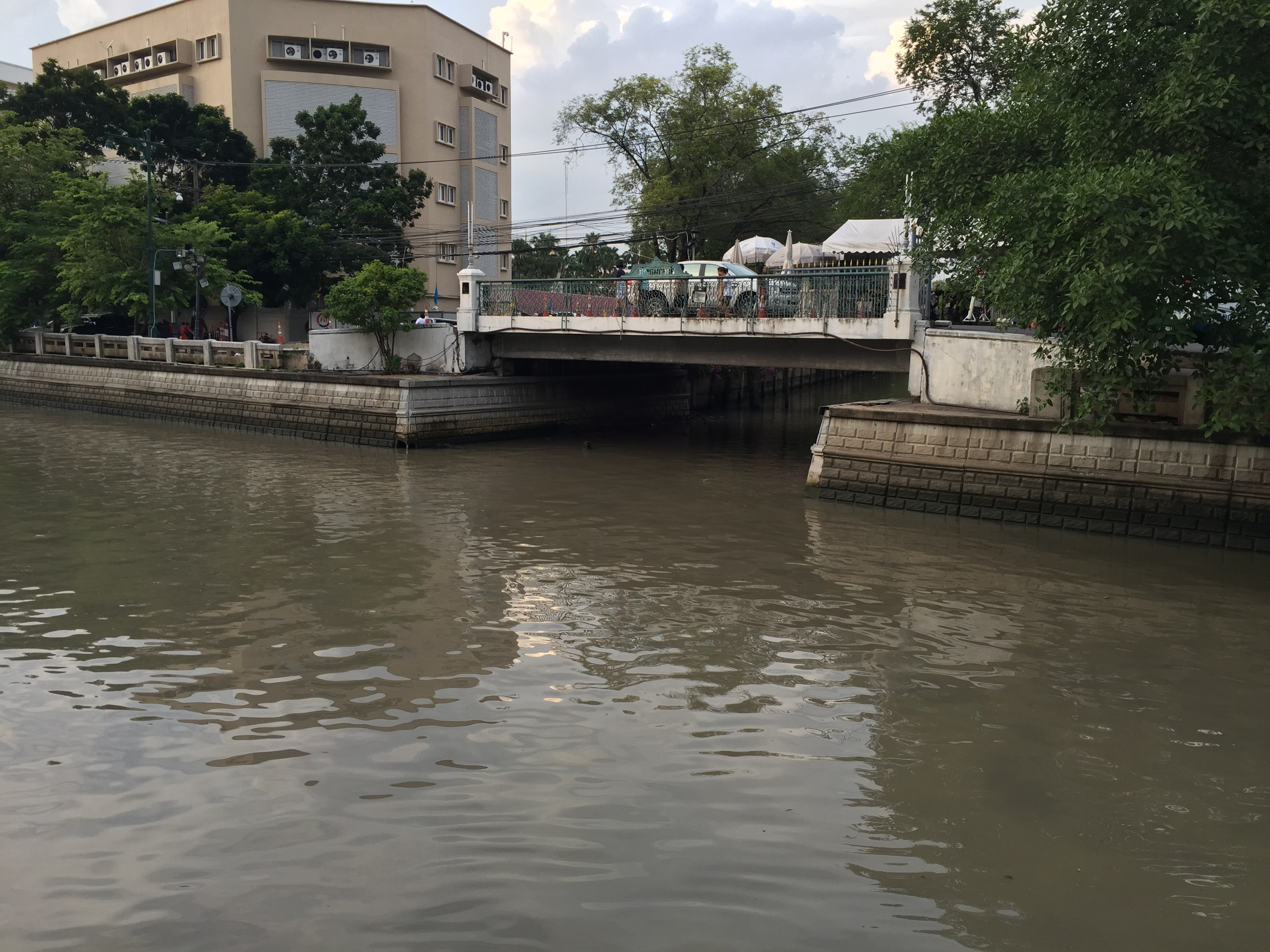
- The starting point that separates from Khlong Phadung Krung Kasem

Specifications
- Length: 50 km (31 miles)

History
- Construction began: Rama V's reign

Geography
- Start point: Bangkok
- End point: Ayutthaya
- Connects to: Khlong Phadung Krung Kasem, Chao Phraya River

Khlong Prem Prachakon (Thai: คลองเปรมประชากร, pronounced [kʰlɔ̄ːŋ prēːm prā.t͡ɕʰāː.kɔ̄ːn]) is a khlong (คลอง, canal) in central Thailand. It's considered to be the first canal dug in the reign of King Chulalongkorn (Rama V). It connects between Bangkok and Ayutthaya total distance 50,846 m (31.6 mi).

King Chulalongkorn had initiated to dig the canal in 1869, in order to have a short-cut waterway bridging two parts of Chao Phraya River. Starting from Khlong Phadung Krung Kasem in front of Wat Sommanas Rajavaravihara beside the Government House in present to reach Tambon Ko Yai (now Tambon Bang Krasan) in Bang Pa-in in Ayutthaya. The canal flows through many districts comprising Dusit, Bang Sue, Chatuchak, Lak Si, Don Mueang of Bangkok and Mueang Pathum Thani, Sam Khok of Pathum Thani, as far as ending in Bang Pa-In in southern Ayutthaya. The canal helped shorten the travelling distance between Rattanakosin (Bangkok) and Ayutthaya to a great extent. Besides, the formerly rough and forested area full of fierce wild elephants frightening the farmers and people to settle. There was then widely open for development and farming. The digging was completed in 1872, as the objectives of digging this canal were to honour King Chulalongkorn and to provide the people with another convenient waterway, the canal was thus named "Khlong Prem Prachakon", which literally means "the canal of citizens joyfulness".

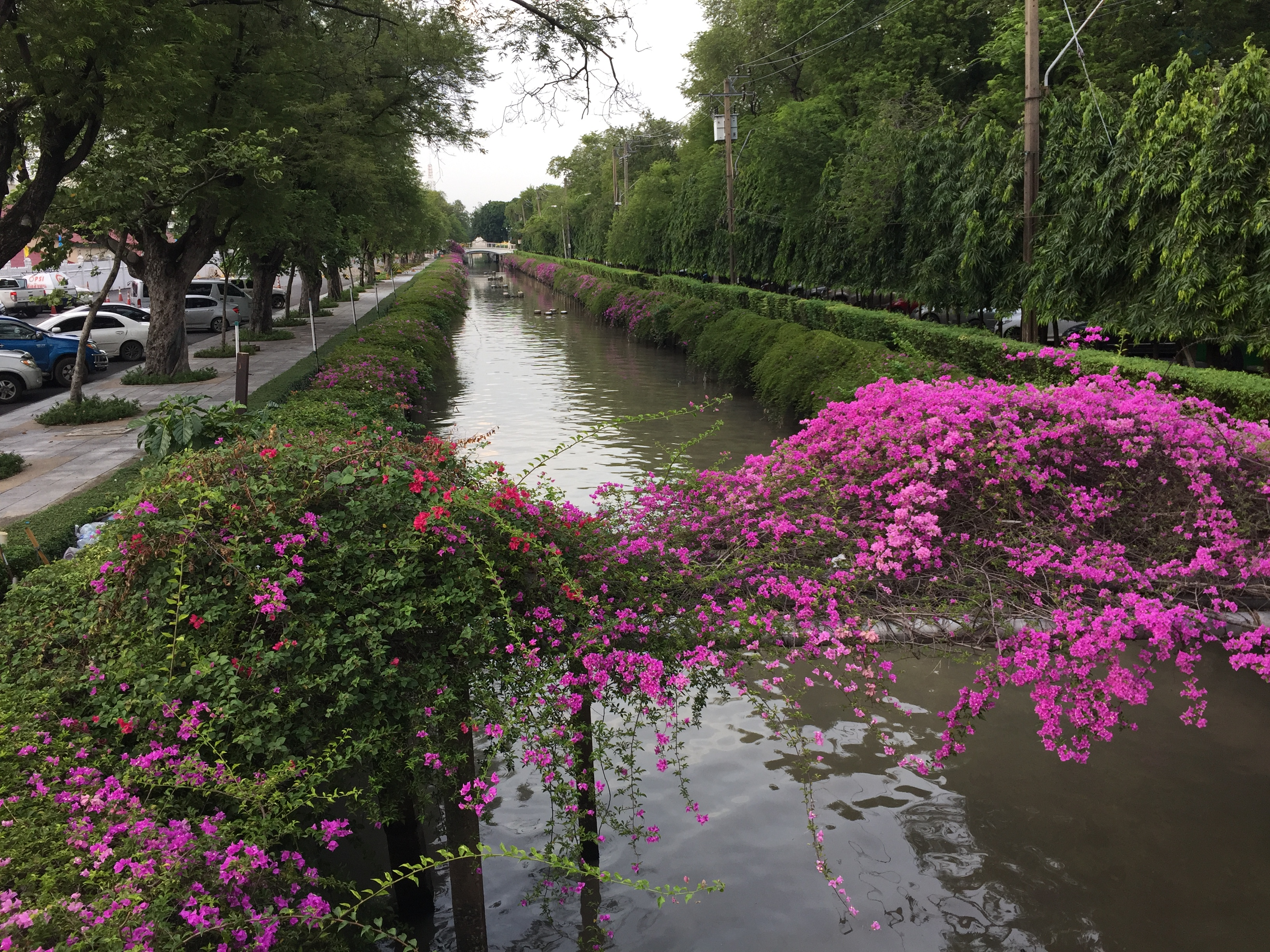
The phase passes through beside the Government House

Once completed, His Majesty the King gave the official name and graciously have a celebration. It's considered a canal that is dug up without any fees or taxes for the excavation of the canal for the benefit of the public.

Moreover, the name of Lak Si is derived from the milestone along the canal in the past. There were periodic milestones and their numbering sequence had become the places name of its present location.
